= Women's rights =

Rights claimed for women and girls worldwide

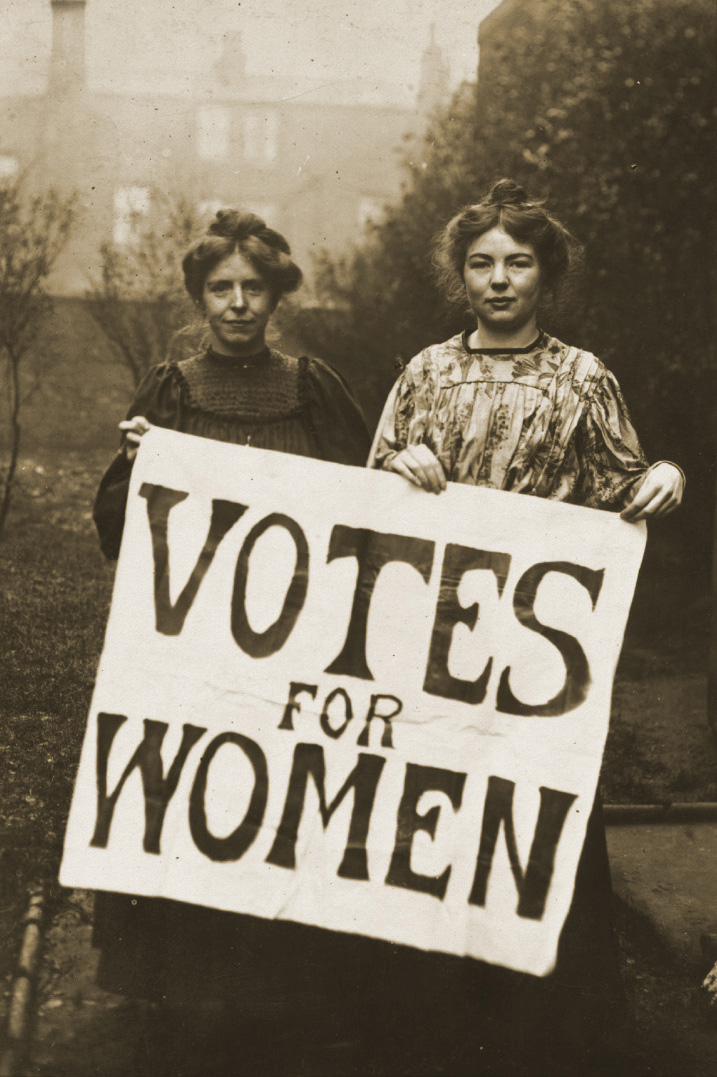
Annie Kenney and Christabel Pankhurst campaigning for women's suffrage in 1908

Women's rights are the rights and entitlements claimed for women and girls worldwide. They formed the basis for the women's rights movement in the 19th century and the feminist movements during the 20th and 21st centuries. In some countries, these rights are institutionalized or supported by law, local custom, and behavior, whereas in others, they are ignored and suppressed. They differ from broader notions of human rights through claims of an inherent historical and traditional bias against the exercise of rights by women and girls, in favor of men and boys.

Issues commonly associated with notions of women's rights include the right to bodily integrity and autonomy, to be free from sexual violence, to vote, to hold public office, to enter into legal contracts, to have equal rights in family law, to work, to fair wages or equal pay, to have reproductive rights, to own property, and to education.

== History ==
Women and men have equal rights to immovable property

Women can apply passport same as men

Women can obtain divorce same as men

Women can open bank account same as men

Women can register a business in the same way as men

Women can sign a contract same as men

Women can take the same jobs as men

Women choose where to live same way as men

Women have the same rights to remarry as men

=== Ancient history ===
==== Mesopotamia ====
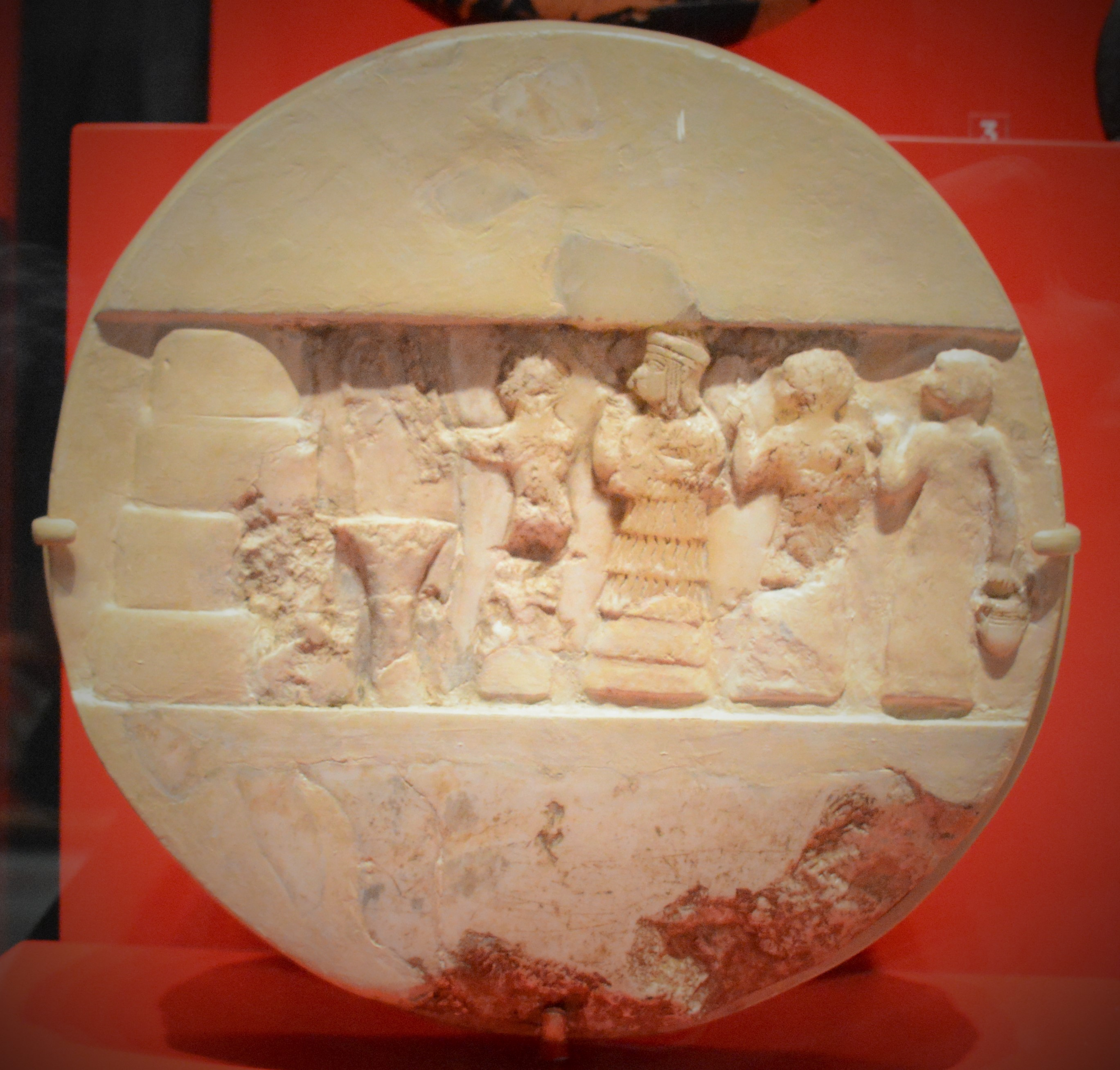
Ancient Sumerian bas-relief portrait depicting the poet Enheduanna

Women in ancient Sumer could buy, own, sell, and inherit property. They could engage in commerce, and testify in court as witnesses. Nonetheless, their husbands could divorce them for mild infractions, and a divorced husband could easily remarry another woman, provided that his first wife had borne him no offspring. Female deities, such as Inanna, were widely worshipped. The Akkadian poet Enheduanna, the priestess of Inanna, is the earliest known poet whose name has been recorded.

Old Babylonian law codes permitted a husband to divorce his wife under any circumstances, but doing so required him to return all of her property and sometimes pay her a fine. Most law codes forbade a woman to request her husband for a divorce and enforced the same penalties on a woman asking for divorce as on a woman caught in the act of adultery. Some Babylonian and Assyrian laws, however, afforded women the same right to divorce as men, requiring them to pay the same fine. The majority of East Semitic deities were male.

==== Egypt ====
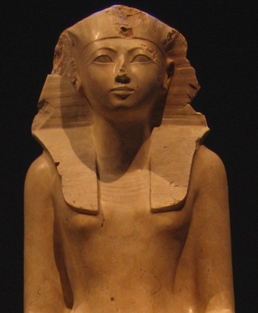
Statue of the female pharaoh Hatshepsut on display at the Metropolitan Museum of Art

In ancient Egypt, women enjoyed the same rights under the law as a man, however rightful entitlements depended upon social class. Landed property descended in the female line from mother to daughter, and women were entitled to administer their own property. Women in ancient Egypt could buy, sell, be a partner in legal contracts, be executors in wills and witnesses to legal documents, bring court action, and adopt children.

==== India ====
Women during the early Vedic period enjoyed equal status with men in all aspects of life. Works by ancient Indian grammarians such as Patanjali and Katyayana suggest that women were educated in the early Vedic period. Rigvedic verses suggest that women married at a mature age and were probably free to select their own husbands in a practice called swayamvar or live-in relationship called Gandharva marriage.

==== Greece ====
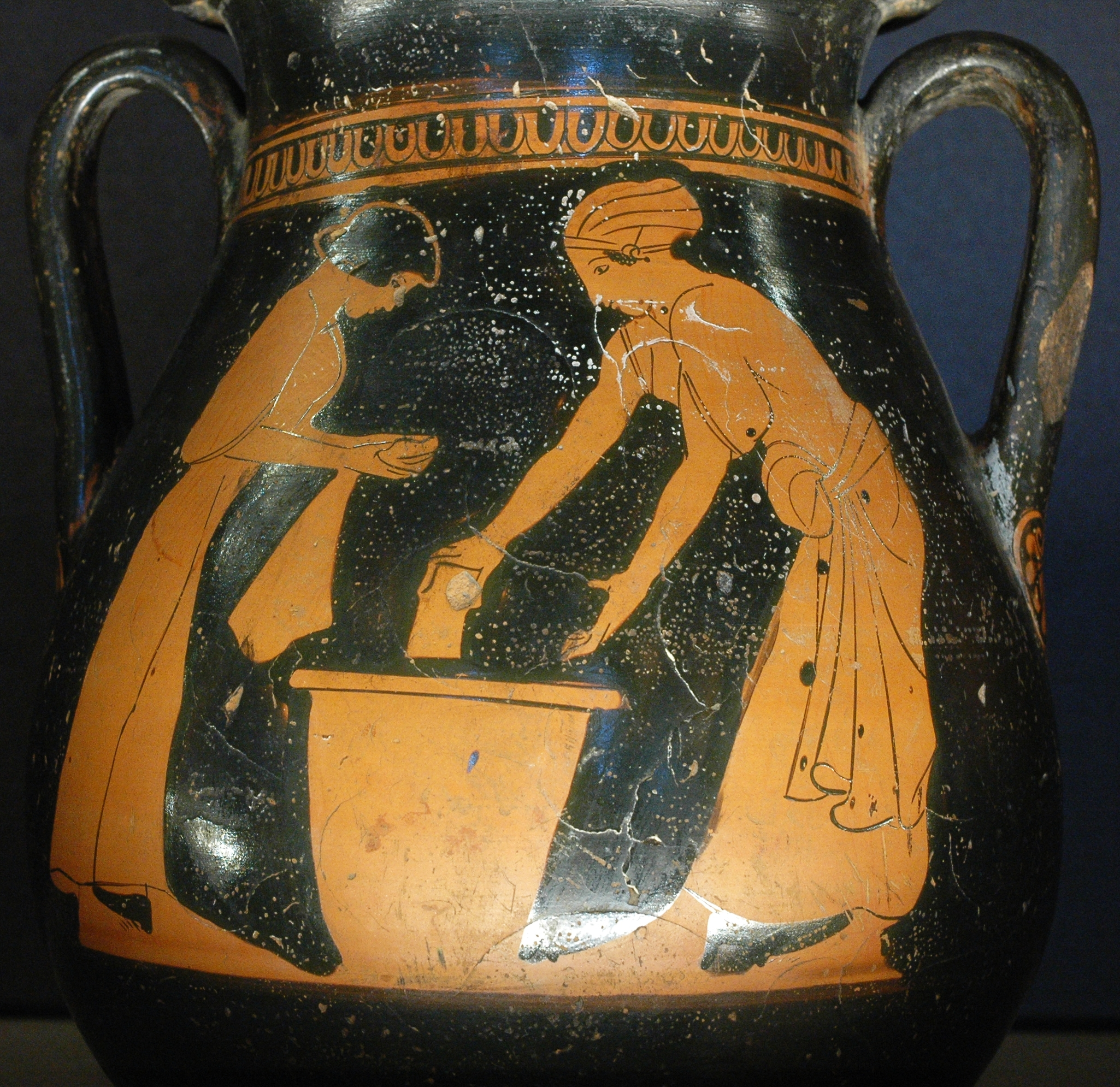
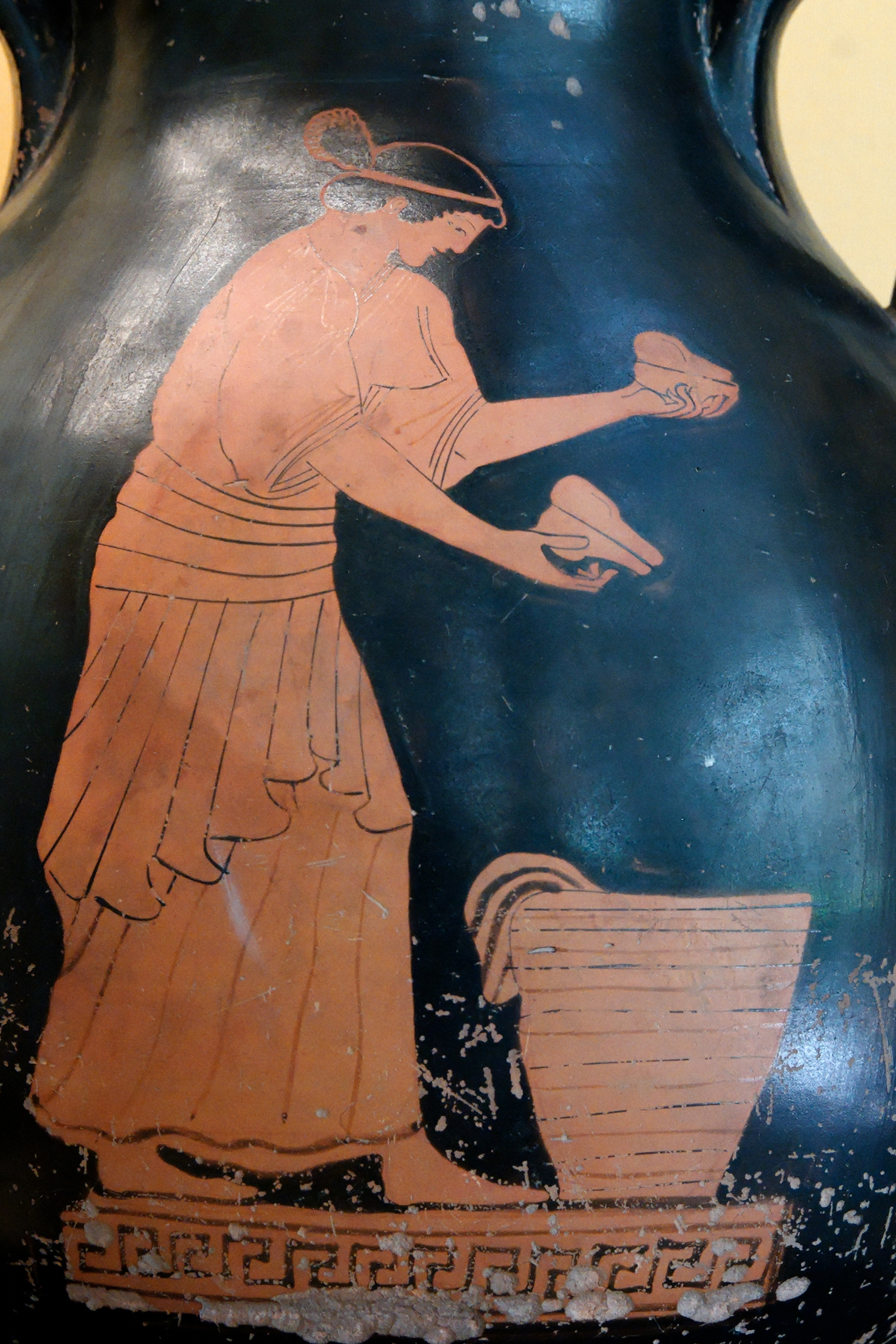
Respectable Athenian women were expected to involve themselves in domestic tasks such as washing clothes (left); in reality, many worked (right).

Although most women lacked political and equal rights in the city states of ancient Greece, they enjoyed a certain freedom of movement until the Archaic age. Records also exist of women in ancient Delphi, Gortyn, Thessaly, Megara, and Sparta owning land, the most prestigious form of private property at the time. However, after the Archaic age, legislators began to enact laws enforcing gender segregation, resulting in decreased rights for women.

Women in Classical Athens had no legal personhood and were assumed to be part of the oikos headed by the male kyrios. Until marriage, women were under the guardianship of their father or another male relative. Once married, the husband became a woman's kyrios. As women were barred from conducting legal proceedings, the kyrios would do so on their behalf. Athenian women could only acquire rights over property through gifts, dowry, and inheritance, though her kyrios had the right to dispose of a woman's property. Athenian women could only enter into a contract worth less than the value of a "medimnos of barley" (a measure of grain), allowing women to engage in petty trading. Women were excluded from ancient Athenian democracy, both in principle and in practice. Slaves could become Athenian citizens after being freed, but no woman ever acquired citizenship in ancient Athens.

In classical Athens women were also barred from becoming poets, scholars, politicians, or artists. During the Hellenistic period in Athens, the philosopher Aristotle thought that women would bring disorder and evil, therefore it was best to keep women separate from the rest of the society. This separation would entail living in a room called a gynaikeion, while looking after the duties in the home and having very little exposure to the male world. This was also to ensure that wives only had legitimate children from their husbands. Athenian women received little education, except home tutorship for basic skills such as spinning, weaving, cooking, and some knowledge of money.

Although Spartan women were formally excluded from military and political life, an extremely small group enjoyed considerable status as mothers of Spartan warriors. As men engaged in military activity, women took responsibility for running estates. Following protracted warfare in the 4th century BC, Spartan women owned approximately between 35% and 40% of all Spartan land and property. By the Hellenistic Period, some of the wealthiest Spartans were women. Spartan women controlled their own properties, as well as the properties of male relatives who were away with the army. But despite relatively greater freedom of movement for Spartan women, their role in politics was the same as Athenian women.

Plato acknowledged that extending civil and political rights to women would substantively alter the nature of the household and the state. Aristotle denied that women were slaves or subject to property, arguing that "nature has distinguished between the female and the slave", but he considered wives to be "bought". He argued that women's main economic activity is that of safeguarding the household property created by men. According to Aristotle, the labour of women added no value because "the art of household management is not identical with the art of getting wealth, for the one uses the material which the other provides".

Contrary to Plato's views, the Stoic philosophers argued for equality of the sexes, sexual inequality being in their view contrary to the laws of nature. In doing so, they followed the Cynics, who argued that men and women should wear the same clothing and receive the same kind of education. They also saw marriage as a moral companionship between equals rather than a biological or social necessity. The Stoics adopted the views of the Cynics and added them to their own theories of human nature, thus putting their sexual egalitarianism on a strong philosophical basis.

==== Rome ====
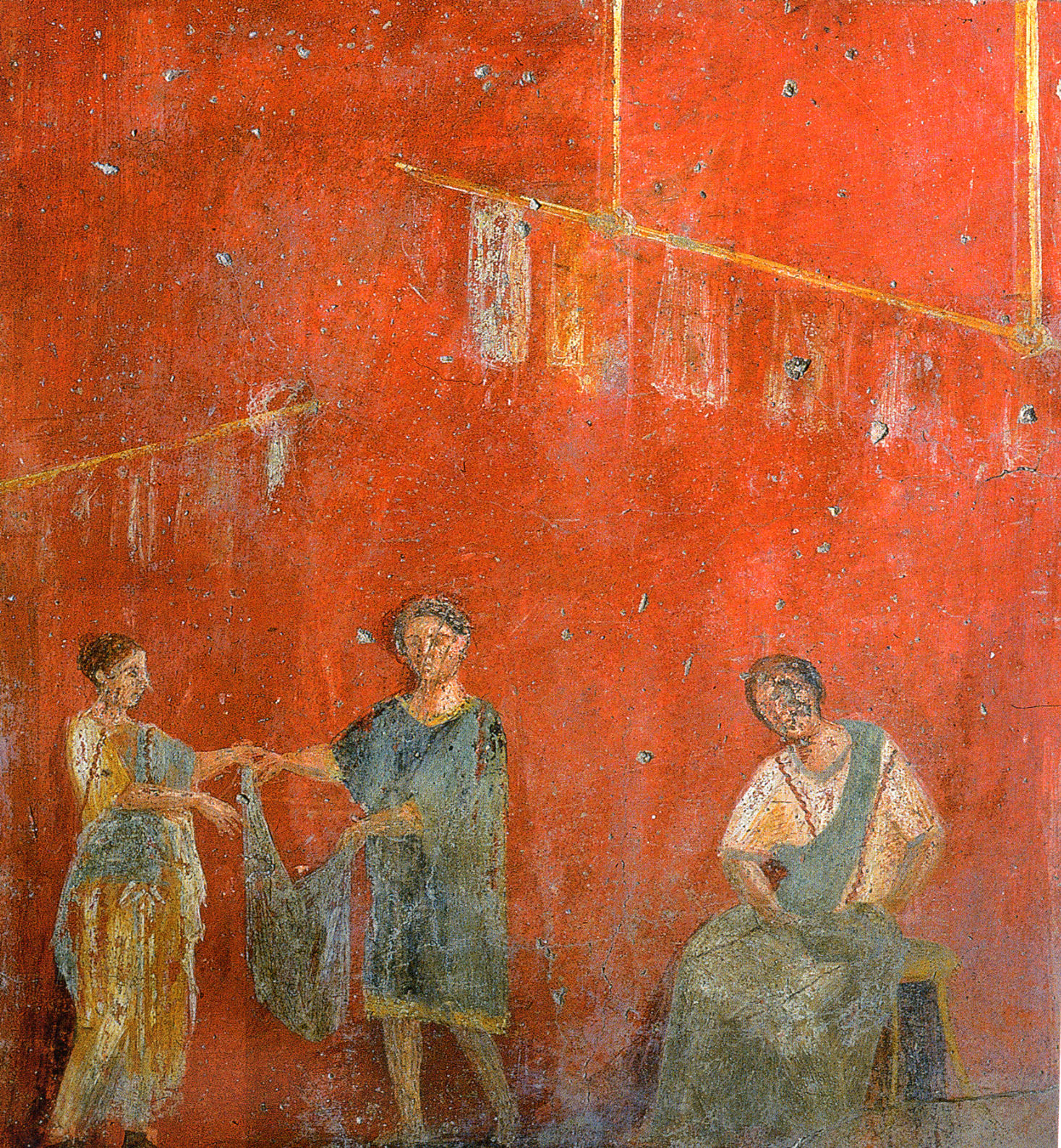
Women working alongside a man at a dye shop (fullonica), on a wall painting from Pompeii

Roman law was created by men in favor of men. Women had no public voice and no public role, which only improved after the 1st century to the 6th century BCE. Freeborn women of ancient Rome were citizens who enjoyed legal privileges and protections that did not extend to non-citizens or slaves. Roman society, however, was patriarchal, and women could not vote, hold public office, or serve in the military. Women of the upper classes exercised political influence through marriage and motherhood. During the Roman Republic, the mothers of the Gracchus brothers and of Julius Caesar were noted as exemplary women who advanced the careers of their sons. During the Imperial period, women of the emperor's family could acquire considerable political power and were regularly depicted in official art and on coinage.

The central core of Roman society was the pater familias or the male head of the household who exercised his authority over all his children, servants, and wife. Girls had equal inheritance rights with boys if their father died without leaving a will. Roman women had a guardian (called "tutor") who managed and oversaw all her activity. This tutelage had limited female activity but by the first century to sixth century BCE, tutelage became very relaxed and women were accepted to participate in more public roles such as owning and managing property or acting as municipal patrons for gladiator games and other entertainment activities Childbearing was encouraged by the state. By 27–14 BCE the ius tritium liberorum ("legal right of three children") granted symbolic honors and legal privileges to a woman who had given birth to three children and freed her from any male guardianship.

In the earliest period of the Roman Republic, a bride passed from her father's control into the "hand" (manus) of her husband. She then became subject to her husband's potestas, though to a lesser degree than their children. This archaic form of manus marriage was largely abandoned by the time of Julius Caesar, when a woman remained under her father's authority by law even when she moved into her husband's home. This arrangement was one of the factors in the independence Roman women enjoyed.

Although women had to answer to their fathers in legal matters, they were free of his direct scrutiny in their daily lives, and their husbands had no legal power over them. When a woman's father died, she became legally emancipated (sui iuris). A married woman retained ownership of any property she brought into the marriage. Girls had equal inheritance rights with boys if their father died without leaving a will. Under classical Roman law, a husband had no right to abuse his wife physically or compel her to have sex. Wife beating was sufficient grounds for divorce or other legal action against the husband.

Because of their legal status as citizens and the degree to which they could become emancipated, women in ancient Rome could own property, enter contracts, and engage in business. Some acquired and disposed of sizable fortunes, and are recorded in inscriptions as benefactors in funding major public works. Roman women could appear in court and argue cases, though it was customary for them to be represented by a man. They were simultaneously disparaged as too ignorant and weak-minded to practice law, and as too active and influential in legal matters—resulting in an edict that limited women to conducting cases on their own behalf instead of others'. But even after this restriction was put in place, there are numerous examples of women taking informed actions in legal matters, including dictating legal strategy to their male advocates.

Roman law recognized rape as a crime in which the victim bore no guilt and a capital crime. The rape of a woman was considered an attack on her family and father's honour, and rape victims were shamed for allowing the bad name in her father's honour. As a matter of law, rape could be committed only against a citizen in good standing. The rape of a slave could be prosecuted only as damage to her owner's property.

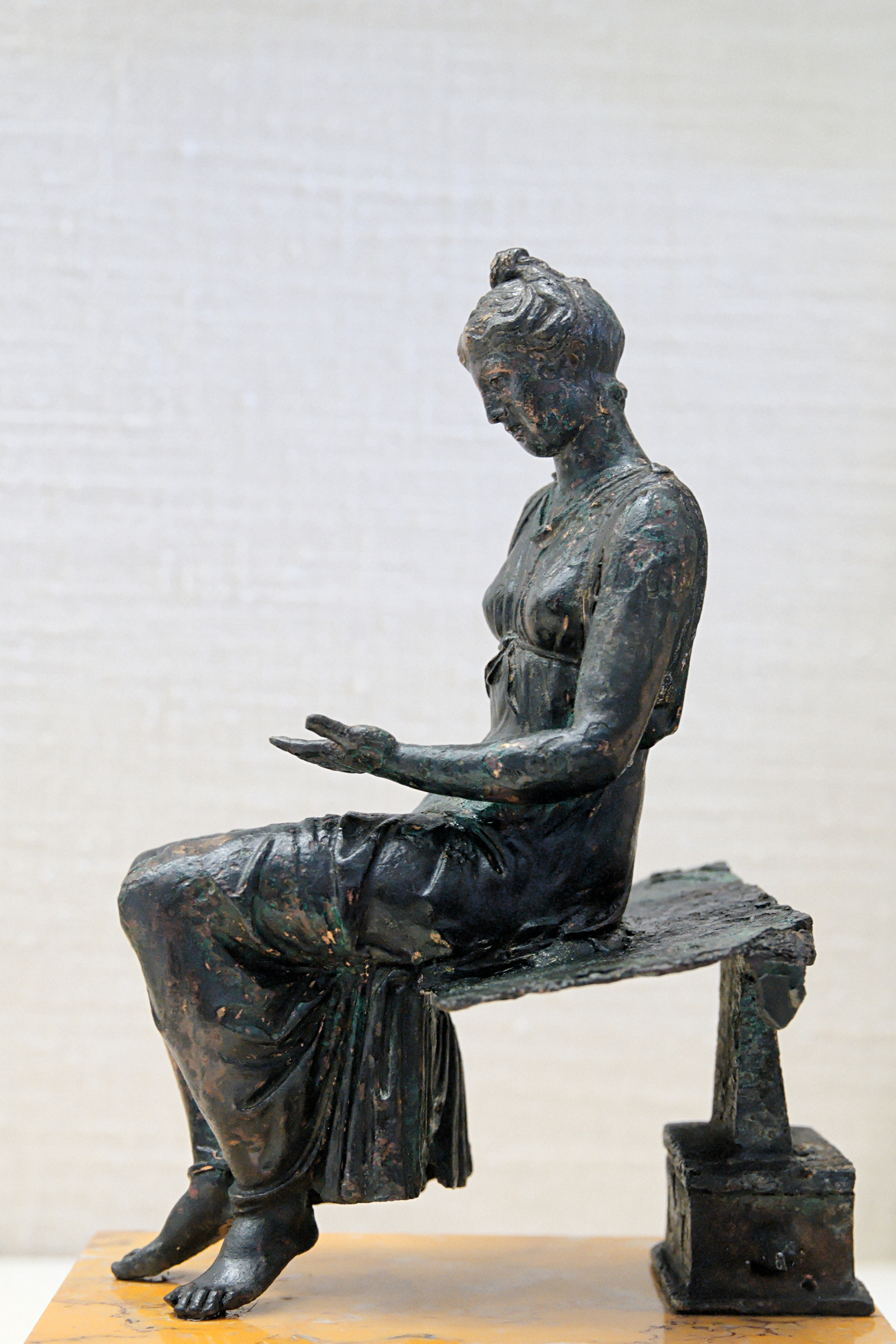
Bronze statuette of a young woman reading (latter 1st century)

The first Roman emperor, Augustus, framed his ascent to sole power as a return to traditional morality, and attempted to regulate the conduct of women through moral legislation. Adultery, which had been a private family matter under the Republic, was criminalized, and defined broadly as an illicit sex act (stuprum) that occurred between a male citizen and a married woman, or between a married woman and any man other than her husband. Therefore, a married woman could have sex only with her husband, but a married man did not commit adultery when he had sex with a prostitute, slave, or person of marginalized status (infamis). Most prostitutes in ancient Rome were slaves, though some slaves were protected from forced prostitution by a clause in their sales contract. A free woman who worked as a prostitute or entertainer lost her social standing and became infamis, "disreputable"; by making her body publicly available, she had in effect surrendered her right to be protected from sexual abuse or physical violence.

Stoic philosophies influenced the development of Roman law. Stoics of the Imperial era such as Seneca and Musonius Rufus developed theories of just relationships. While not advocating equality in society or under the law, they held that nature gives men and women equal capacity for virtue and equal obligations to act virtuously, and that therefore men and women had an equal need for philosophical education. These philosophical trends among the ruling elite are thought to have helped improve the status of women under the Empire. Rome had no system of state-supported schooling, and education was available only to those who could pay for it. The daughters of senators and knights seem to have regularly received a primary education (for ages 7 to 12). Regardless of gender, few people were educated beyond that level. Girls from a modest background might be schooled in order to help with the family business or to acquire literacy skills that enabled them to work as scribes and secretaries. The woman who achieved the greatest prominence in the ancient world for her learning was Hypatia of Alexandria, who taught advanced courses to young men and advised the Roman prefect of Egypt on politics.

Couple clasping hands in marriage, idealized by Romans as the building block of society and as a partnership of companions who work together to produce and rear children, manage everyday affairs, lead exemplary lives, and enjoy affection

==== China ====
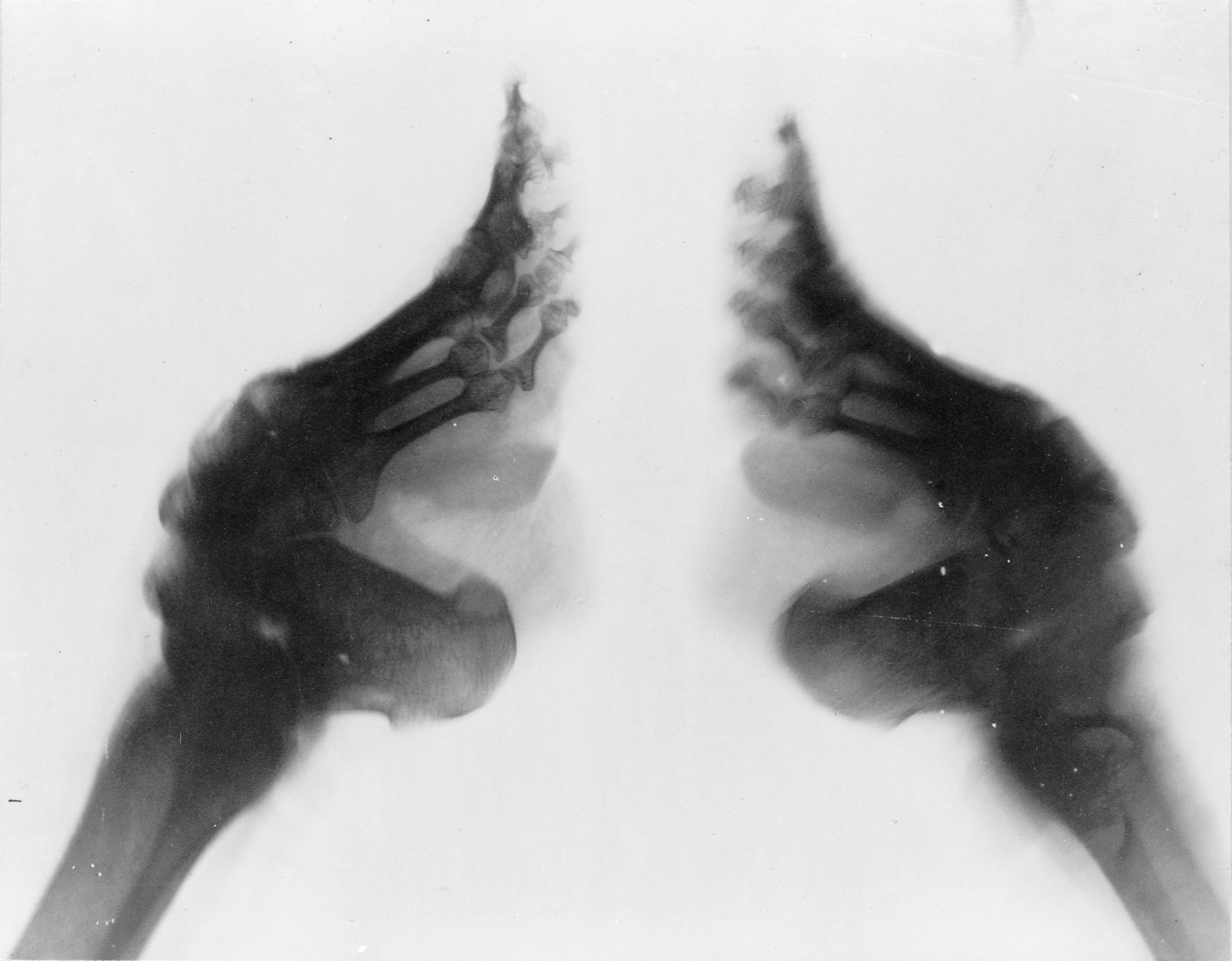
Foot binding, a practice commonly inflicted on Chinese women between the 10th century and the early 20th century. The image shows an X-ray of two bound feet.

Confucian thinking relegated women in China to subordinate roles and foot binding left them homemakers. About 45% of Chinese women had bound feet in the 19th century. For the upper classes, it was almost 100%. In 1912, the Chinese government ordered the cessation of foot-binding. Foot-binding involved the alteration of the bone structure so that the feet were only about four inches long. The bound feet caused difficulty in movement, thus greatly limiting the activities of women.

Due to the social custom that men and women should not be near each other, the women of China were reluctant to be treated by male doctors of Western Medicine. This resulted in a tremendous need for female doctors of Western Medicine in China. Thus, female medical missionary Mary H. Fulton was sent by the Foreign Missions Board of the Presbyterian Church (USA) to found the first medical college for women in China. Known as the Hackett Medical College for Women (夏葛女子醫學院), the college was aimed at the spreading of Christianity and modern medicine and the elevation of Chinese women's social status.

During the Republic of China (1912–49) and earlier Chinese governments, women were legally bought and sold into slavery under the guise of domestic servants. These women were known as Mui Tsai. The lives of Mui Tsai were recorded by American feminist Agnes Smedley in her book Portraits of Chinese Women in Revolution.

However, in 1949 the Republic of China was overthrown by communist guerillas led by Mao Zedong, and the People's Republic of China was founded in the same year. In May 1950 the People's Republic of China enacted the New Marriage Law to tackle the sale of women into slavery. This outlawed marriage by proxy and made marriage legal so long as both partners consent. The New Marriage Law raised the legal age of marriage to 20 for men and 18 for women. This was an essential part of countryside land reform as women could no longer legally be sold to landlords. The official slogan was "Men and women are equal; everyone is worth his (or her) salt".

=== Post-classical history ===
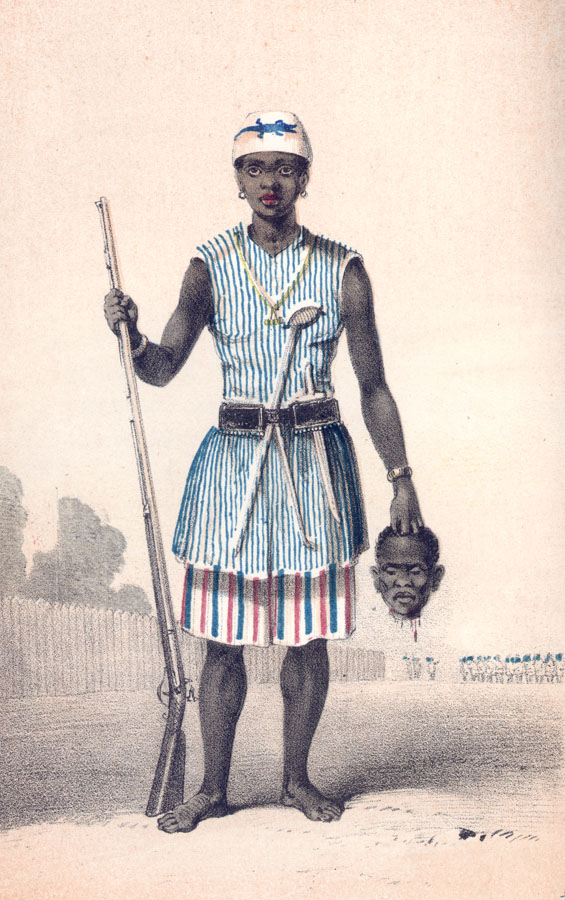
Dahomey Amazons were a Fon all-female military regiment of the Kingdom of Dahomey.

==== Religious scriptures ====
===== Bible =====
Both before and during biblical times, the roles of women in society were severely restricted. Nonetheless, in the Bible, women are depicted as having the right to represent themselves in court, the ability to make contracts, and the rights to purchase, own, sell, and inherit property. The Bible guarantees women the right to sex with their husbands and orders husbands to feed and clothe their wives. Breach of these Old Testament rights by a polygamous man gave the woman grounds for divorce.

===== Qur'an =====
The Qur'an prescribes limited rights for women in marriage, divorce, and inheritance. By providing that the wife, not her family, would receive a dowry from the husband, which she could administer as her personal property, the Qur'an made women a legal party to the marriage contract.

While in customary law, inheritance was often limited to male descendants, the Qur'an included rules on inheritance with certain fixed shares being distributed to designated heirs, first to the nearest female relatives and then the nearest male relatives. According to Annemarie Schimmel "compared to the pre-Islamic position of [Arab] women, Islamic legislation meant an enormous progress; the woman has the right, at least according to the letter of the law, to administer the wealth she has brought into the family or has earned by her own work."

For Arab women, Islam included the prohibition of female infanticide and recognizing women's full personhood. Women generally gained greater rights than women in pre-Islamic Arabia and medieval Europe. Women were not accorded such legal status in other cultures until centuries later. According to Professor William Montgomery Watt, when seen in such a historical context, Muhammad "can be seen as a figure who testified on behalf of women's rights."

==== Western Europe ====
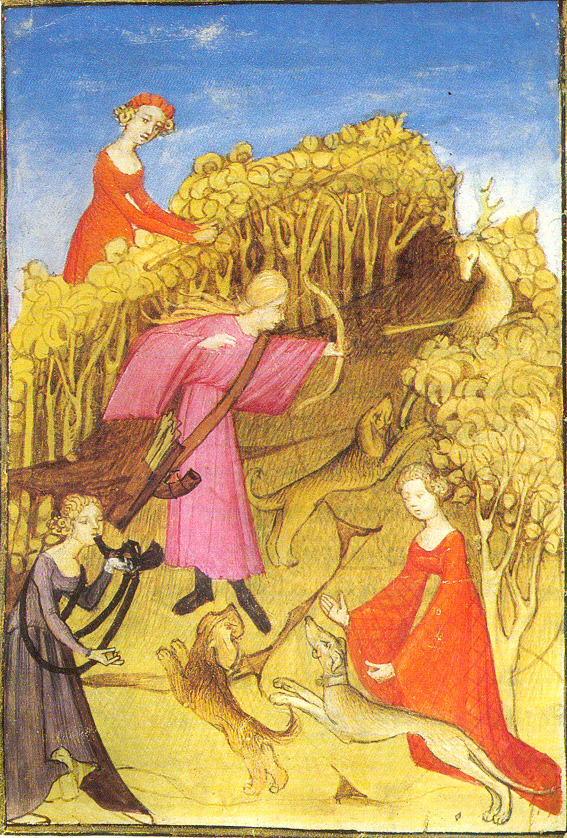
Women performing tasks during the Middle Ages

Women's rights were protected already by the early Medieval Christian Church: one of the first formal legal provisions for the right of wives was promulgated by council of Adge in 506, which in Canon XVI stipulated that if a young married man wished to be ordained, he required the consent of his wife.

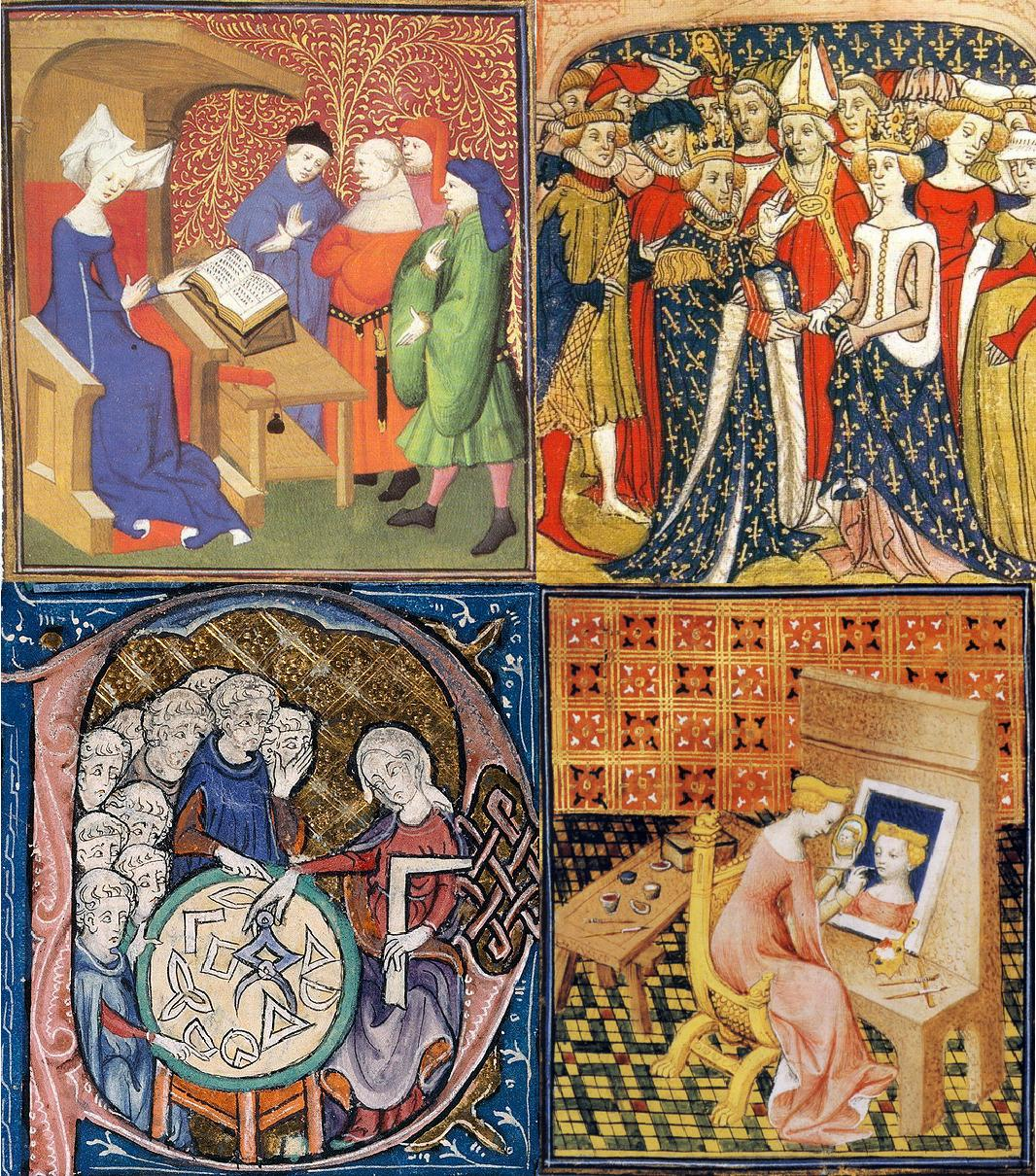
Royal women's activities in the Middle Ages

Under Irish law, women were forbidden to act as witnesses. In Welsh law, women could testify against other women, but not against men. But Welsh laws, specifically The Laws of Hywel Dda, also reflected accountability for men to pay child maintenance for children born out of wedlock, which empowered women to claim rightful payment. In France, women's testimony was insufficient on its own and had to be corroborated.

Swedish law protected women from the authority of their husbands by transferring the authority to their male relatives. A wife's property and land also could not be taken by the husband without her family's consent but neither could the wife. This meant a woman could not transfer her property to her husband without her family or kinsman's consent either. In Swedish law, while inheritance was equal for residents of towns and cities, women in the countryside were only entitled to half the share of men. Despite these legal issues, Sweden was largely ahead and much superior in its treatment towards women than most European countries.

Medieval marriages among the elites were arranged as to benefit the family's interests. Theoretically a woman needed to consent before a marriage took place and the Church encouraged this consent to be expressed in the present tense rather than as a future commitment. Marriage could also take place anywhere and the minimum age for girls was 12, while it was 14 for boys.

==== Northern Europe ====
During the Viking Age, women had a relatively free status in the Nordic countries of Sweden, Denmark and Norway, illustrated in the Icelandic Grágás and the Norwegian Frostating laws and Gulating laws. The paternal aunt, paternal niece and paternal granddaughter, referred to as odalkvinna, all had the right to inherit property from a deceased man. In the absence of male relatives, an unmarried woman with no son could, furthermore, inherit not only property, but also the position as head of the family from a deceased father or brother. A woman with such status was referred to as ringkvinna, and she exercised all the rights afforded to the head of a family clan, such as the right to demand and receive fines for the slaughter of a family member, unless she married, by which her rights were transferred to her husband.

After the age of 20, an unmarried woman, referred to as maer and mey, reached legal majority, had the right to decide her place of residence, and was regarded as her own person before the law. An exception to her independence was the right to choose a marriage partner, as marriages were normally arranged by the clan. Widows enjoyed the same independent status as unmarried women. Women had religious authority and were active as priestesses (gydja) and oracles (sejdkvinna); within art as poets (skalder) and rune masters; and as merchants and medicine women. They may also have been active within military office: the stories about shieldmaidens are unconfirmed, but some archaeological finds such as the Birka female Viking warrior may indicate that at least some women in military authority existed. A married woman could divorce her husband and remarry.

It was also socially acceptable for a free woman to cohabit with a man and have children with him without marrying him, even if that man was married; a woman in such a position was called frilla. There was no distinction made between children born inside or outside of marriage: both had the right to inherit property after their parents, and there were no "legitimate" or "illegitimate" children. These liberties gradually disappeared after the introduction of Christianity, and from the late 13th century, they are no longer mentioned. During the Christian Middle Ages, the Medieval Scandinavian law applied different laws depending on the local county law, signifying that the status of women could vary depending on which county she was living in.

=== Modern history ===
==== Europe ====
===== 16th and 17th century Europe =====
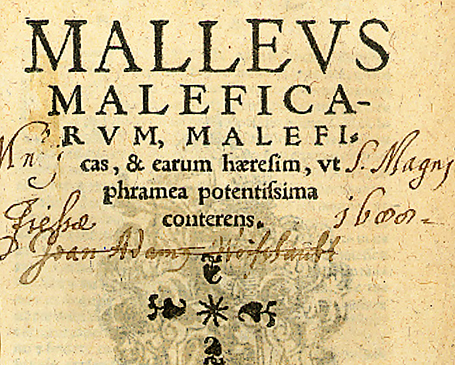
Title page of the seventh Cologne edition of the Malleus Maleficarum, 1520 (from the University of Sydney Library), a book endorsing the extermination of witches

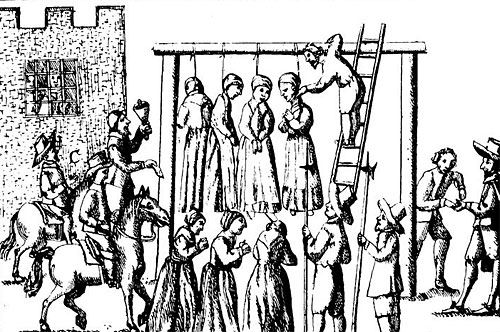
An image of suspected witches being hanged in England, published in 1655

The 16th and 17th centuries saw numerous witch trials, which resulted in thousands of people across Europe being executed, of whom 75–95% were women (depending on time and place). The executions mostly took place in German-speaking lands, and during the 15th century the terminology "witchcraft" was definitely viewed as something feminine as opposed to prior years. Famous witchcraft manuals such as the Malleus Maleficarum and Summis Desiderantes depicted witches as diabolical conspirators who worshipped Satan and were primarily women. Culture and art at the time depicted these witches as seductive and evil, further fuelling moral panic in fusion with rhetoric from the Church.

The origin of the female "witch" myth traces back to Roman mythical night creatures known as Strix, who were thought to appear and disappear mysteriously in the night. They were also believed by many to be of transformed women by their own supernatural powers. This Roman myth itself is believed to originate from the Jewish Sabbath which described non-supernatural women who would suspiciously leave and return home swiftly during the night. Authors of the Malleus Maleficarum strongly established the link between witchcraft and women by proclaiming a greater likelihood for women to be addicted to "evil". The authors and inquisitors Heinrich Kramer and Jacob Sprengerh justified these beliefs by claiming women had greater credulity, impressionability, feeble minds, feeble bodies, impulsivity and carnal natures which were flaws susceptible to "evil" behavior and witchcraft. These sorts of beliefs at the time could send female hermits or beggars to trials just for offering remedies or herbal medicine. This set of developed myths eventually lead to the 16–17th century witch trials which found thousands of women burned at the stake.

According to English Common Law, which developed from the 12th century onward, all property which a wife held at the time of marriage became a possession of her husband. Eventually, English courts forbade a husband's transferring property without the consent of his wife, but he still retained the right to manage it and to receive the money which it produced. French married women suffered from restrictions on their legal capacity which were removed only in 1965. In the 16th century, the Reformation in Europe allowed more women to add their voices, including the English writers Jane Anger, Aemilia Lanyer, and the prophetess Anna Trapnell. English and American Quakers believed that men and women were equal. Many Quaker women were preachers. Despite relatively greater freedom for Anglo-Saxon women, until the mid-19th century, writers largely assumed that a patriarchal order was a natural order that had always existed. This perception was not seriously challenged until the 18th century when Jesuit missionaries found matrilineality in native North American peoples.

The philosopher John Locke opposed marital inequality and the mistreatment of women during this time. He was well known for advocating for marital equality among the sexes in his work during the 17th century. According to a study published in the American Journal of Social Issues & Humanities, the condition for women during Locke's time were as quote:

- English women had fewer grounds for divorce than men until 1923
- Husbands controlled most of their wives' personal property until the Married Women's Property Act 1870 and Married Women's Property Act 1882
- Children were the husband's property
- Rape was legally impossible within a marriage
- Wives lacked crucial features of legal personhood, since the husband was taken as the representative of the family (thereby eliminating the need for women's suffrage). These legal features of marriage suggest that the idea of a marriage between equals appeared unlikely to most Victorians. (Quoted from Gender and Good Governance in John Locke, American Journal of Social Issues & Humanities Vol 2)

A paternal society can find prefer to make women's rights a man's duty, for instance under English common law husbands had to maintain their wives. This duty was abolished in 2010.

===== 18th and 19th century Europe =====
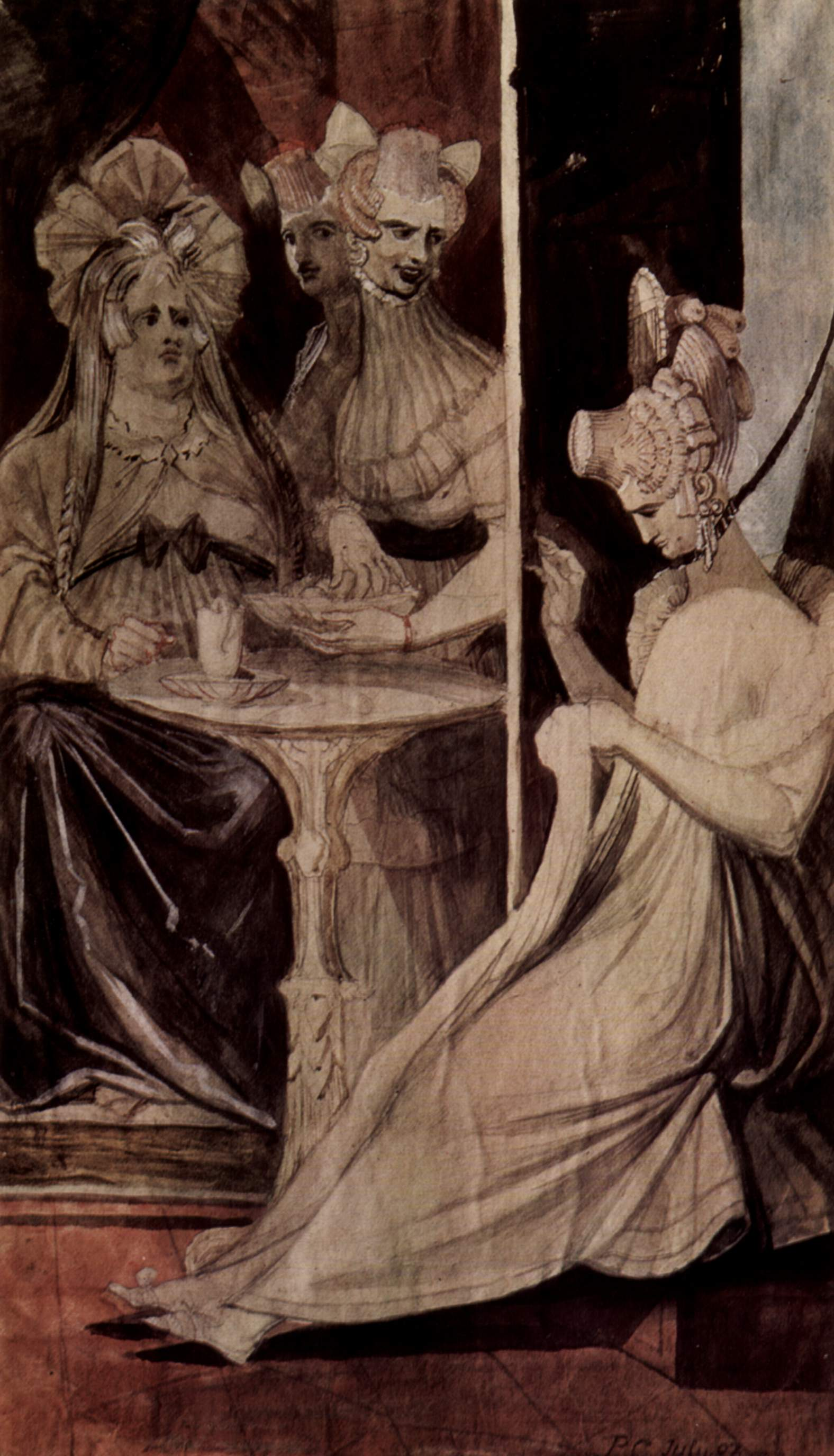
The Debutante (1807) by Henry Fuseli; The woman, victim of male social conventions, is tied to the wall, made to sew and guarded by governesses. The picture reflects Mary Wollstonecraft's views in A Vindication of the Rights of Woman, published in 1792.

Starting in the late 18th century, and throughout the 19th century, rights, as a concept and claim, gained increasing political, social, and philosophical importance in Europe. Movements emerged which demanded freedom of religion, the abolition of slavery, rights for women, rights for those who did not own property, and universal suffrage. In the late 18th century the question of women's rights became central to political debates in both France and Britain. At the time some of the greatest thinkers of the Enlightenment, who defended democratic principles of equality and challenged notions that a privileged few should rule over the vast majority of the population, believed that these principles should be applied only to their own gender and their own race. The philosopher Jean-Jacques Rousseau, for example, thought that it was the order of nature for women to obey men.

In 1754, Dorothea Erxleben became the first German woman receiving a M.D. (University of Halle)

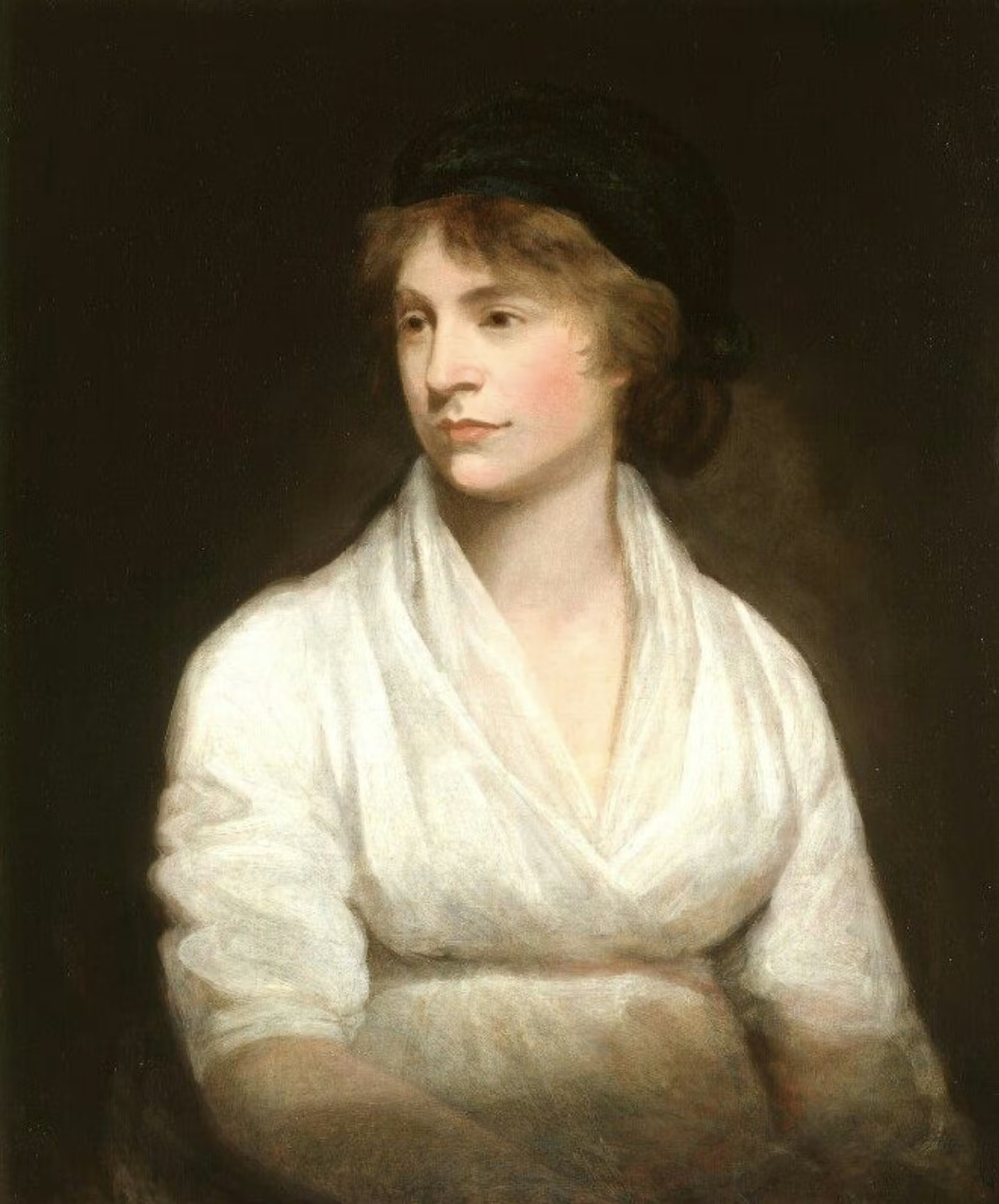
Mary Wollstonecraft by John Opie (c. 1797)

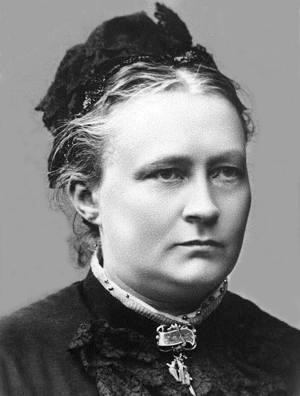
Minna Canth (1844–1897), a Finnish author and social activist, was one of the most significant European feminists and advocates of women's rights.

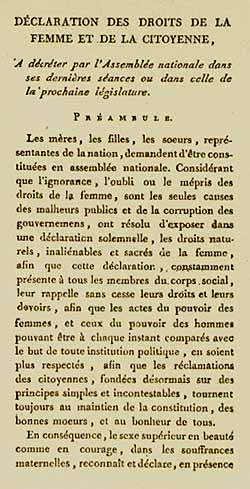
First page of the Declaration of the Rights of Woman and of the Female Citizen

In 1791 the French playwright and political activist Olympe de Gouges published the Declaration of the Rights of Woman and of the Female Citizen, modelled on the Declaration of the Rights of Man and of the Citizen of 1789. The Declaration is ironic in formulation and exposes the failure of the French Revolution, which had been devoted to equality. It states that: "This revolution will only take effect when all women become fully aware of their deplorable condition, and of the rights they have lost in society". The Declaration of the Rights of Woman and the Female Citizen follows the seventeen articles of the Declaration of the Rights of Man and of the Citizen point for point and has been described by Camille Naish as "almost a parody... of the original document". The first article of the Declaration of the Rights of Man and of the Citizen proclaims that "Men are born and remain free and equal in rights. Social distinctions may be based only on common utility." The first article of the Declaration of the Rights of Woman and of the Female Citizen replied: "Woman is born free and remains equal to man in rights. Social distinctions may only be based on common utility". De Gouges expands the sixth article of the Declaration of the Rights of Man and of the Citizen, which declared the rights of citizens to take part in the formation of law, to:

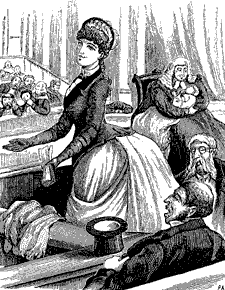
Australian women's rights were lampooned in this 1887 Melbourne Punch cartoon: A hypothetical female member foists her baby's care on the House Speaker.

All citizens including women are equally admissible to all public dignities, offices and employments, according to their capacity, and with no other distinction than that of their virtues and talents.

De Gouges also draws attention to the fact that under French law women were fully punishable, yet denied equal rights.

Mary Wollstonecraft, a British writer and philosopher, published A Vindication of the Rights of Woman in 1792, arguing that it was the education and upbringing of women that created limited expectations. Wollstonecraft attacked gender oppression, pressing for equal educational opportunities, and demanded "justice!" and "rights to humanity" for all. Wollstonecraft, along with her British contemporaries Damaris Cudworth and Catharine Macaulay, started to use the language of rights in relation to women, arguing that women should have greater opportunity because like men, they were moral and rational beings. Mary Robinson wrote in a similar vein in "A Letter to the Women of England, on the Injustice of Mental Subordination.", 1799.

A Punch cartoon from 1867 mocking John Stuart Mill's attempt to replace the term 'man' with 'person', i.e. give women the right to vote. Caption: Mill's Logic: Or, Franchise for Females. "Pray clear the way, there, for these – a – persons."

In his 1869 essay "The Subjection of Women" the English philosopher and political theorist John Stuart Mill described the situation for women in Britain as follows:

We are continually told that civilization and Christianity have restored to the woman her just rights. Meanwhile, the wife is the actual bondservant of her husband; no less so, as far as the legal obligation goes, than slaves commonly so called.

Then a member of parliament, Mill argued that women deserve the right to vote, though his proposal to replace the term "man" with "person" in the second Reform Bill of 1867 was greeted with laughter in the House of Commons and defeated by 76 to 196 votes. His arguments won little support amongst contemporaries but his attempt to amend the reform bill generated greater attention for the issue of women's suffrage in Britain. Initially only one of several women's rights campaigns, suffrage became the primary cause of the British women's movement at the beginning of the 20th century. At the time, the ability to vote was restricted to wealthy property owners within British jurisdictions. This arrangement implicitly excluded women as property law and marriage law gave men ownership rights at marriage or inheritance until the 19th century. Although male suffrage broadened during the century, women were explicitly prohibited from voting nationally and locally in the 1830s by the Reform Act 1832 and the Municipal Corporations Act 1835. Millicent Fawcett and Emmeline Pankhurst led the public campaign on women's suffrage and in 1918 a bill was passed allowing women over the age of 30 to vote.

By the 1860s, the economic sexual politics of middle-class women in Britain and its neighboring Western European countries was guided by factors such as the evolution of 19th century consumer culture. While women, particularly those in the middle class, obtained modest control of daily household expenses and had the ability to leave the house, attend social events, and shop for personal and household items, Europe's socioeconomic climate pervaded the ideology that women were not in complete control over their urges to spend (assuming) their husband or father's wages. As a result, many advertisements for socially 'feminine' goods revolved around upward social progression, exoticisms from the Orient, and added efficiency for household roles women were deemed responsible for.

===== Russia =====
By law and custom, Muscovite Russia was a patriarchal society that subordinated women to men, and the young to their elders. Peter the Great relaxed the second custom, but not the subordination of women. A decree of 1722 explicitly forbade any forced marriages by requiring both bride and groom to consent, while parental permission still remained a requirement. But during Peter's reign, only the man could get rid of his wife by putting her in a nunnery.

In terms of laws, there were double standards for women. Adulterous wives were sentenced to forced labor, while men who murdered their wives were merely flogged. After the death of Peter the Great, laws and customs pertaining to men's marital authority over their wives increased. In 1782, civil law reinforced women's responsibility to obey their husbands. By 1832, the Digest of laws changed this obligation into "unlimited obedience".

In the 18th century, the Russian orthodox church further got its authority over marriage and banned priests from granting divorce, even for severely abused wives. By 1818, the Russian senate had also forbade the separation of married couples.

During World War I, caring for children was increasingly difficult for women, many of whom could not support themselves, and whose husbands had died or were fighting in the war. Many women had to give up their children to children's homes infamous for abuse and neglect. These children's homes were unofficially dubbed as "angel factories". After the October Revolution, the Bolsheviks shut down an infamous angel factory known as the 'Nikolaev Institute' situated near the Moika Canal. The Bolsheviks then replaced the Nikolaev Institute with a modern maternity home called the 'Palace for Mothers and Babies'. This maternity home was used by the Bolsheviks as a model for future maternity hospitals. The countess who ran the old Institute was moved to a side wing, however she spread rumours that the Bolsheviks had removed sacred pictures, and that the nurses were promiscuous with sailors. The maternity hospital was burnt down hours before it was scheduled to open, and the countess was suspected of being responsible.

Russian women had restrictions in owning property until the mid 18th century. Women's rights had improved after the rise of the Soviet Union under the Bolsheviks.

Under the Bolsheviks, Russia became the first country in human history to provide free abortions to women in state-run hospitals.

==== North America ====
===== Canada =====
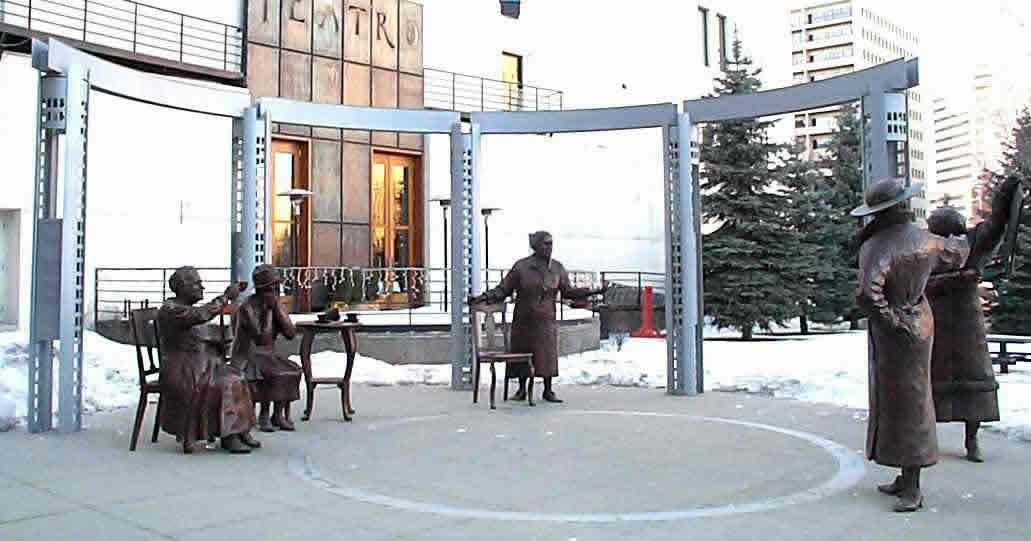
Statue in downtown Calgary of the Famous Five. An identical statue exists on Parliament Hill, Ottawa.

Women's rights activism in Canada during the 19th and early 20th centuries focused on increasing women's role in public life, with goals including women's suffrage, increased property rights, increased access to education, and recognition of women as "persons" under the law. The Famous Five were five Canadian women – Emily Murphy, Irene Marryat Parlby, Nellie Mooney McClung, Louise Crummy McKinney and Henrietta Muir Edwards – who, in 1927, asked the Supreme Court of Canada to answer the question, "Does the word 'Persons' in Section 24 of the British North America Act, 1867, include female persons?" in the case Edwards v. Canada (Attorney General). After Canada's Supreme Court summarized its unanimous decision that women are not such "persons", the judgment was appealed and overturned in 1929 by the British Judicial Committee of the Imperial Privy Council, at that time the court of last resort for Canada.

===== United States =====
The Women's Christian Temperance Union (WCTU) was established in 1873 and championed women's rights, including advocating for prostitutes and for women's suffrage. Women had access to legal handbooks specific for women such as "Every woman her own lawyer: a private guide in all matters of law" (1858) by George Bishop, which informed women of how to deal with property, marriage, divorce, violence, children, abandonment, economic issues, assets, etc.

==== Asia ====
===== Japan =====
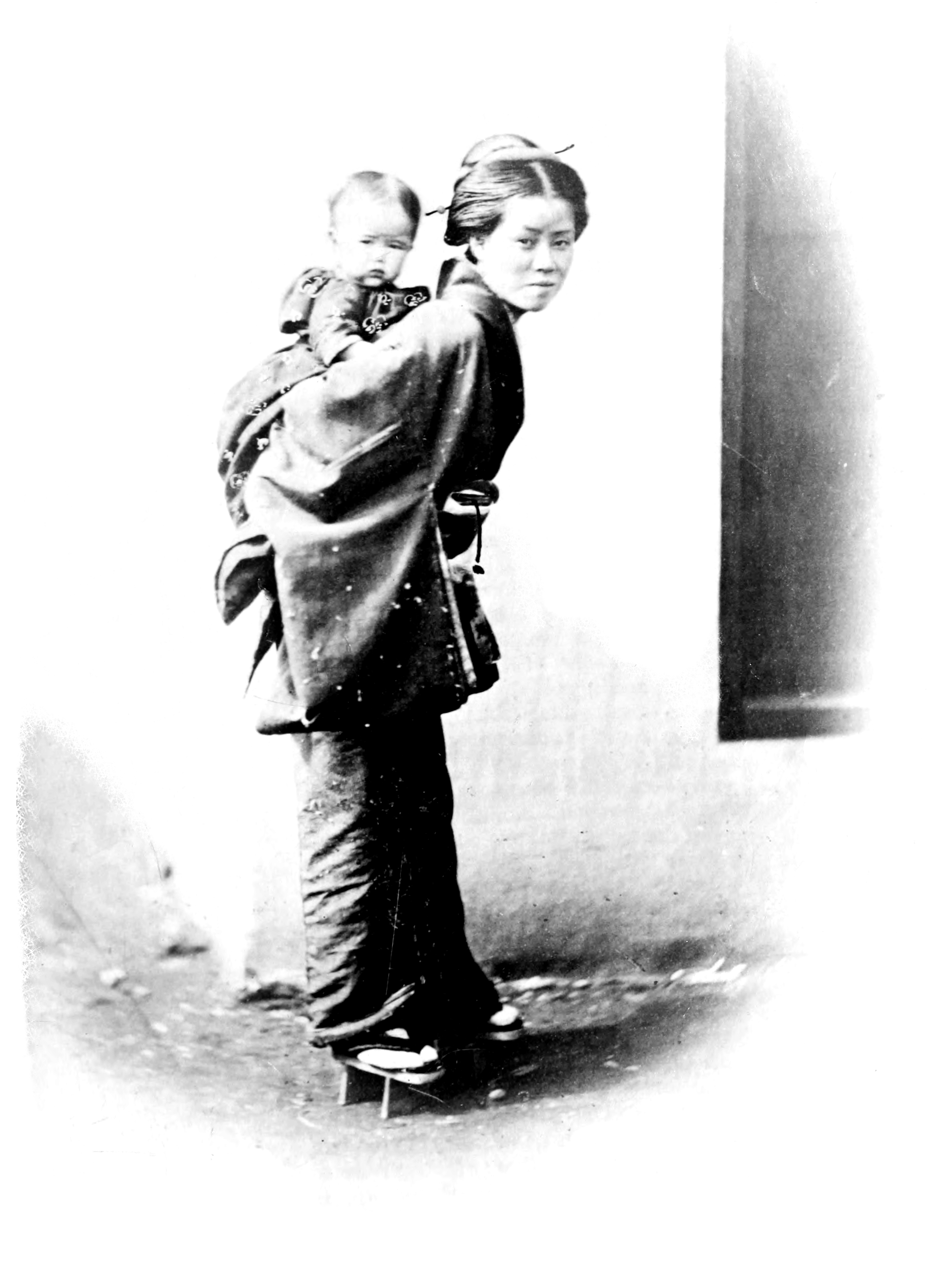
Mother and child, 1872

The extent to which women could participate in Japanese society has varied over time and social classes. In the 8th century, Japan had women emperors, and in the 12th century (Heian period) women in Japan occupied a relatively high status, although still subordinated to men. From the late Edo period, the status of women declined. In the 17th century, the "Onna Daigaku", or "Learning for Women", by Confucianist author Kaibara Ekken, spelled out expectations for Japanese women, lowering significantly their status. During the Meiji period, industrialization and urbanization reduced the authority of fathers and husbands, but at the same time the Meiji Civil Code of 1898 denied women legal rights and subjugated them to the will of household heads.

From the mid-20th century the status of women improved greatly. Although Japan is often considered a very conservative country, it was in fact earlier than many European countries in giving women legal rights in the 20th century, as the 1947 Constitution of Japan provided a legal framework favorable to the advancement of women's equality in Japan. Japan for instance enacted women's suffrage in 1946, earlier than several European countries such as Switzerland (1971 at federal level; 1990 on local issues in the canton of Appenzell Innerrhoden), Portugal (1976 on equal terms with men, with restrictions since 1931), San Marino in 1959, Monaco in 1962, Andorra in 1970, and Liechtenstein in 1984.

===== Central Asia =====
Central Asian cultures largely remain patriarchal, however, since the fall of the former Soviet Union, the secular societies of the region have become more progressive to women's roles outside the traditional construct of being wholly subservient to men. In Mongolia, more women than men complete school and are higher earners as result. The UN Development Programme notes "significant progress" in gender equality in Kazakhstan but discrimination persists. Marriage by abduction remains a serious problem in this region; the practice of bride kidnapping is prevalent in Kyrgyzstan, Kazakhstan, Turkmenistan, and Karakalpakstan, an autonomous region of Uzbekistan.

==== Oceania ====
===== Australia =====
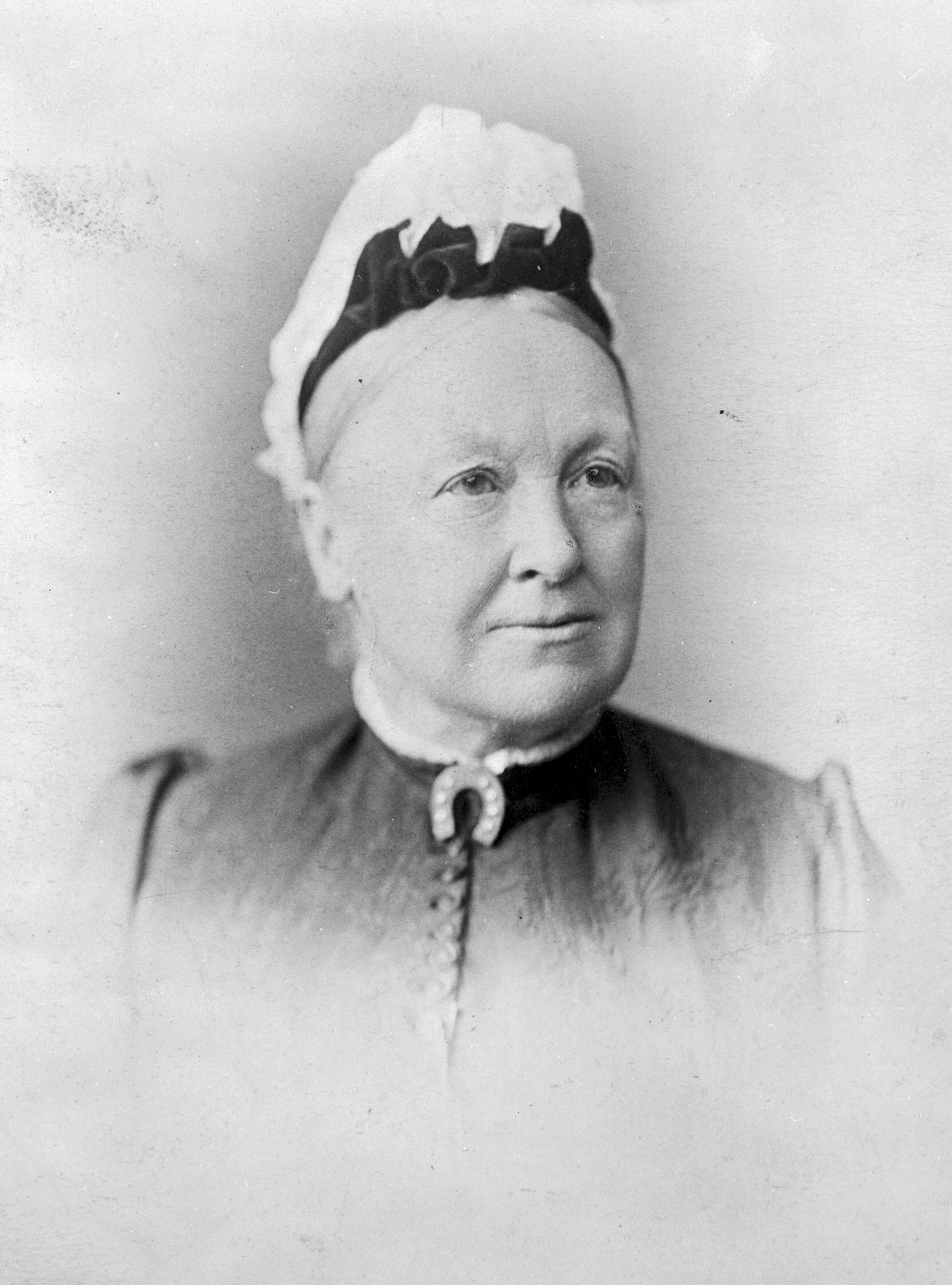
Australia's first female political candidate, South Australian suffragette Catherine Helen Spence (1825–1910)

The history of women's rights in Australia is a contradictory one: while Australia led the world in women's suffrage rights in the 19th century, it has been very slow in recognizing women's professional rights – it was not until 1966 that its marriage bar was removed. On the other hand, reforms which allowed women both to vote and stand for office in South Australia in the late 19th century were a cornerstone for women's political rights in other parts of the world. In this regard, Australia differs from other cultures, in that women's suffrage in Australia was one of the earliest objectives of the feminist movement there (beginning with South Australia and Western Australia) unlike other cultures, such as Eastern European cultures, where at the turn of the 20th century the feminist movement focused on labour rights, access to professions and education, rather than political rights. To this day, Australia has a quite low percentage of women in business executive roles compared to other countries with equivalent corporate structures.

== Core concepts ==
=== Equal employment ===
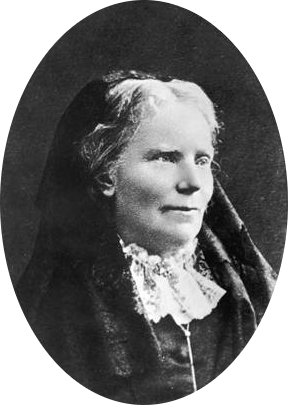
Elizabeth Blackwell was the first woman to receive a medical degree in the United States, as well as the first woman on the UK Medical Register.

Employment rights for women include non-discriminatory access of women to jobs and equal pay. The rights of women and men to have equal pay and equal benefits for equal work were openly denied by the British Hong Kong Government up to the early 1970s. Leslie Wah-Leung Chung (鍾華亮, 1917–2009), President of the Hong Kong Chinese Civil Servants' Association 香港政府華員會 (1965–68), contributed to the establishment of equal pay for men and women, including the right for married women to be permanent employees. Before this, the job status of a woman changed from permanent employee to temporary employee once she was married, thus losing the pension benefit. Some of them even lost their jobs. Since nurses were mostly women, this improvement of the rights of married women meant much to the nursing profession. In some European countries, married women could not work without the consent of their husbands until a few decades ago, for example in France until 1965 and in Spain until 1975. In addition, marriage bars, a practice adopted from the late 19th century to the 1970s across many countries, including Austria, Australia, Ireland, Canada, and Switzerland, restricted married women from employment in many professions.

A key issue towards insuring gender equality in the workplace is the respecting of maternity rights and reproductive rights of women. Maternity leave (and paternity leave in some countries) and parental leave are temporary periods of absence from employment granted immediately before and after childbirth in order to support the mother's full recovery and grant time to care for the baby. Different countries have different rules regarding maternity leave, paternity leave and parental leave. In the European Union (EU) the policies vary significantly by country, but the EU members must abide by the minimum standards of the Pregnant Workers Directive and Work–Life Balance Directive.

=== Right to vote ===
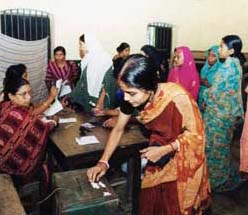
Women standing in line to vote in Bangladesh

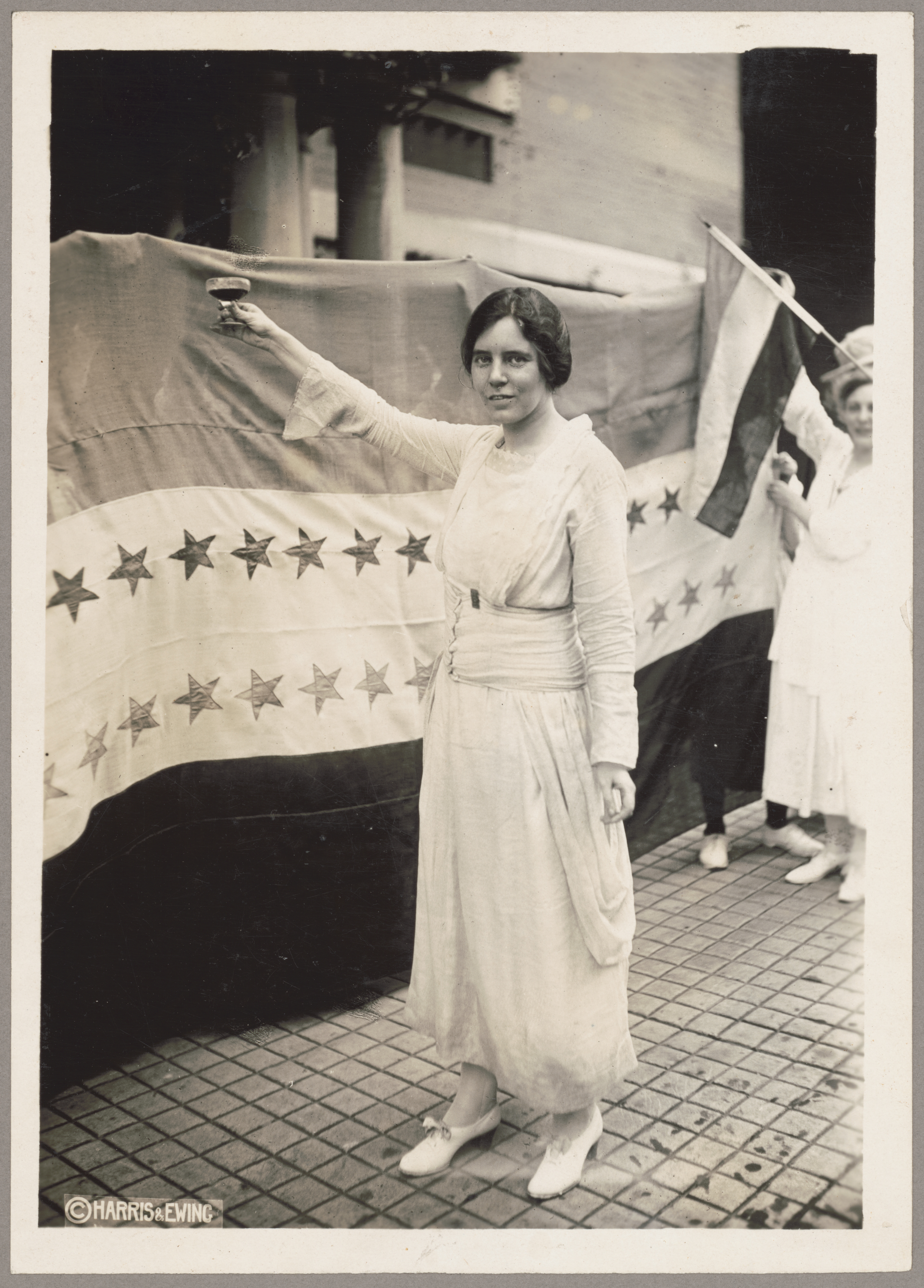
Strategist and activist Alice Paul guided and ran much of the Suffrage movement in the U.S. in the 1910s.

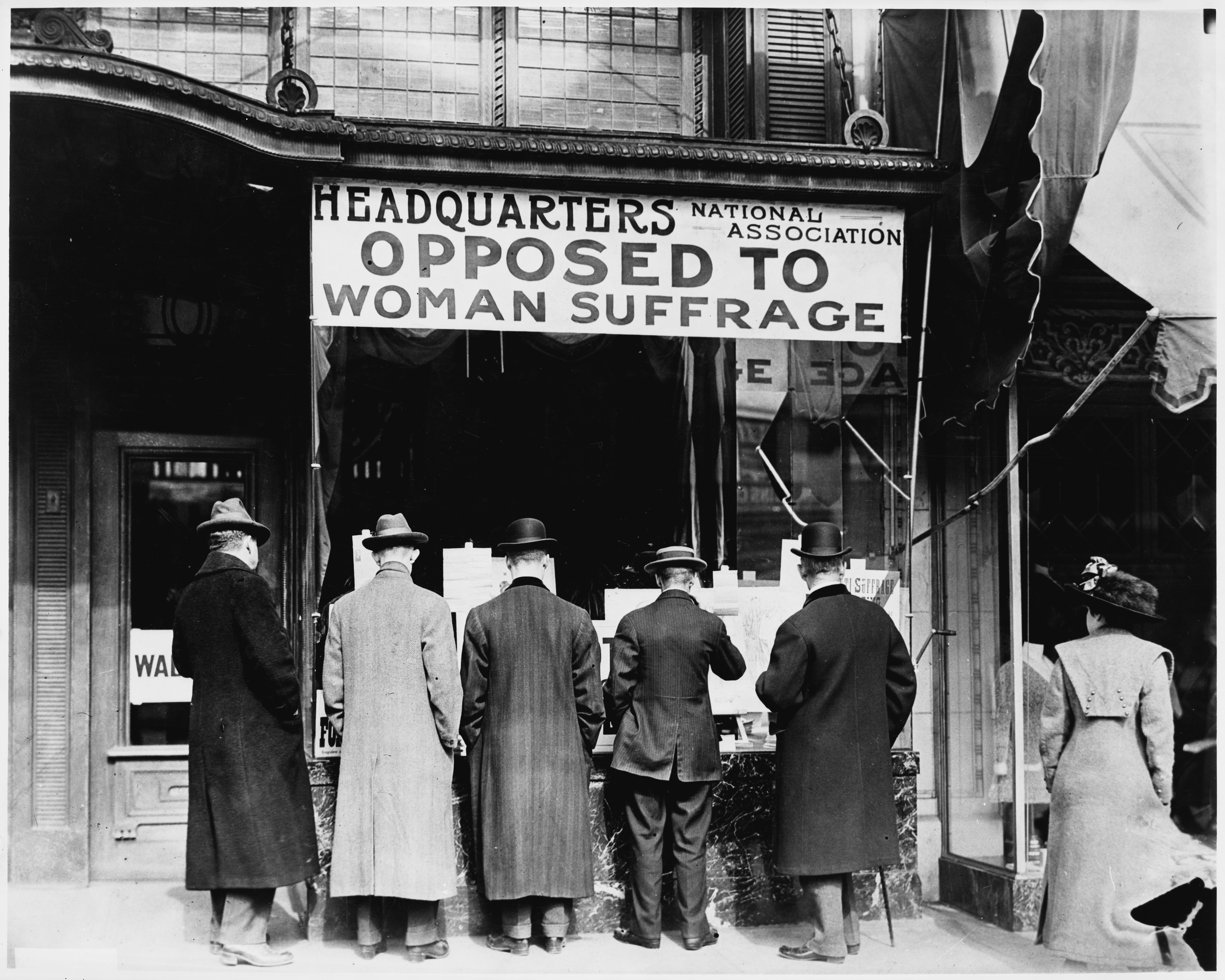
Headquarters of the National Association Opposed to Woman Suffrage, United States, early 20th century

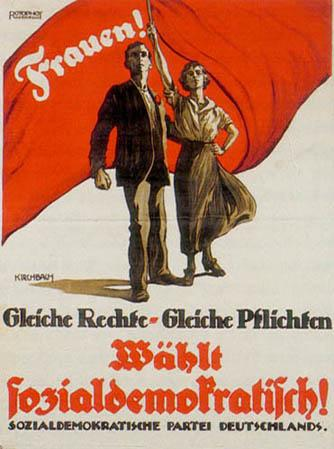
1919 election poster, German social democrats. "Frauen! Gleiche Rechte, Gleiche Pflichten" ("Women! The same rights, the same duties")

During the 19th century, some women began to ask for, demand, and then agitate and demonstrate for the right to vote – the right to participate in their government and its law-making. Other women opposed suffrage, like Helen Kendrick Johnson, who argued in the 1897 pamphlet Woman and the Republic that women could achieve legal and economic equality without having the vote. The ideals of women's suffrage developed alongside that of universal suffrage and today women's suffrage is considered a right (under the Convention on the Elimination of All Forms of Discrimination Against Women). During the 19th century, the right to vote was gradually extended in many countries, and women started to campaign for their right to vote. In 1893 New Zealand became the first country to give women the right to vote on a national level. Australia gave women the right to vote in 1902.

A number of Nordic countries gave women the right to vote in the early 20th century – Finland (1906), Norway (1913), Denmark and Iceland (1915). With the end of the First World War many other countries followed – the Netherlands (1917), Austria, Azerbaijan, Canada, Czechoslovakia, Georgia, Poland and Sweden (1918), Germany and Luxembourg (1919), Turkey (1934), and the United States (1920). Late adopters in Europe were Greece in 1952, Switzerland (1971 at federal level; 1959–1991 on local issues at canton level), Portugal (1976 on equal terms with men, with restrictions since 1931) as well as the microstates of San Marino in 1959, Monaco in 1962, Andorra in 1970, and Liechtenstein in 1984.

In Canada, most provinces enacted women's suffrage between 1917 and 1919, late adopters being Prince Edward Island in 1922, Newfoundland in 1925 and Quebec in 1940.

In Latin America some countries gave women the right to vote in the first half of the 20th century – Ecuador (1929), Brazil (1932), El Salvador (1939), Dominican Republic (1942), Guatemala (1956) and Argentina (1946). In India, under colonial rule, universal suffrage was granted in 1935. Other Asian countries gave women the right to vote in the mid-20th century – Japan (1945), China (1947) and Indonesia (1955). In Africa, women generally got the right to vote along with men through universal suffrage – Liberia (1947), Uganda (1958) and Nigeria (1960). In many countries in the Middle East universal suffrage was acquired after World War II, although in others, such as Kuwait, suffrage is very limited. On 16 May 2005, the Parliament of Kuwait extended suffrage to women by a 35–23 vote.

=== Property rights ===
During the 19th century some women, such as Ernestine Rose, Paulina Wright Davis, Elizabeth Cady Stanton, Harriet Beecher Stowe, in the United States and Britain began to challenge laws that denied them the right to their property once they married. Under the common law doctrine of coverture husbands gained control of their wives' real estate and wages. Beginning in the 1840s, state legislatures in the United States and the British Parliament began passing statutes that protected women's property from their husbands and their husbands' creditors. These laws were known as the Married Women's Property Acts. Courts in the 19th-century United States also continued to require privy examinations of married women who sold their property. A privy examination was a practice in which a married woman who wished to sell her property had to be separately examined by a judge or justice of the peace outside of the presence of her husband and asked if her husband was pressuring her into signing the document. Property rights for women continued to be restricted in many European countries until legal reforms of the 1960-70s. For example, in West Germany, the law pertaining to rural farm succession favored male heirs until 1963. In the US, Head and master laws, which gave sole control of marital property to the husband, were common until a few decades ago. The Supreme Court, in Kirchberg v. Feenstra (1981), declared such laws unconstitutional.

=== Freedom of movement ===
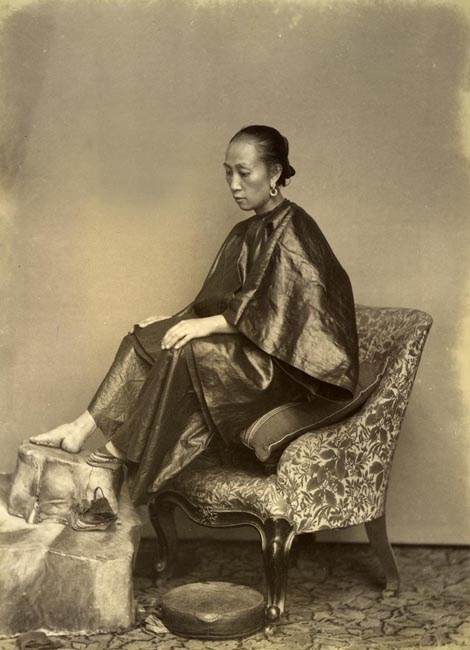
Woman with bound feet, 1870s

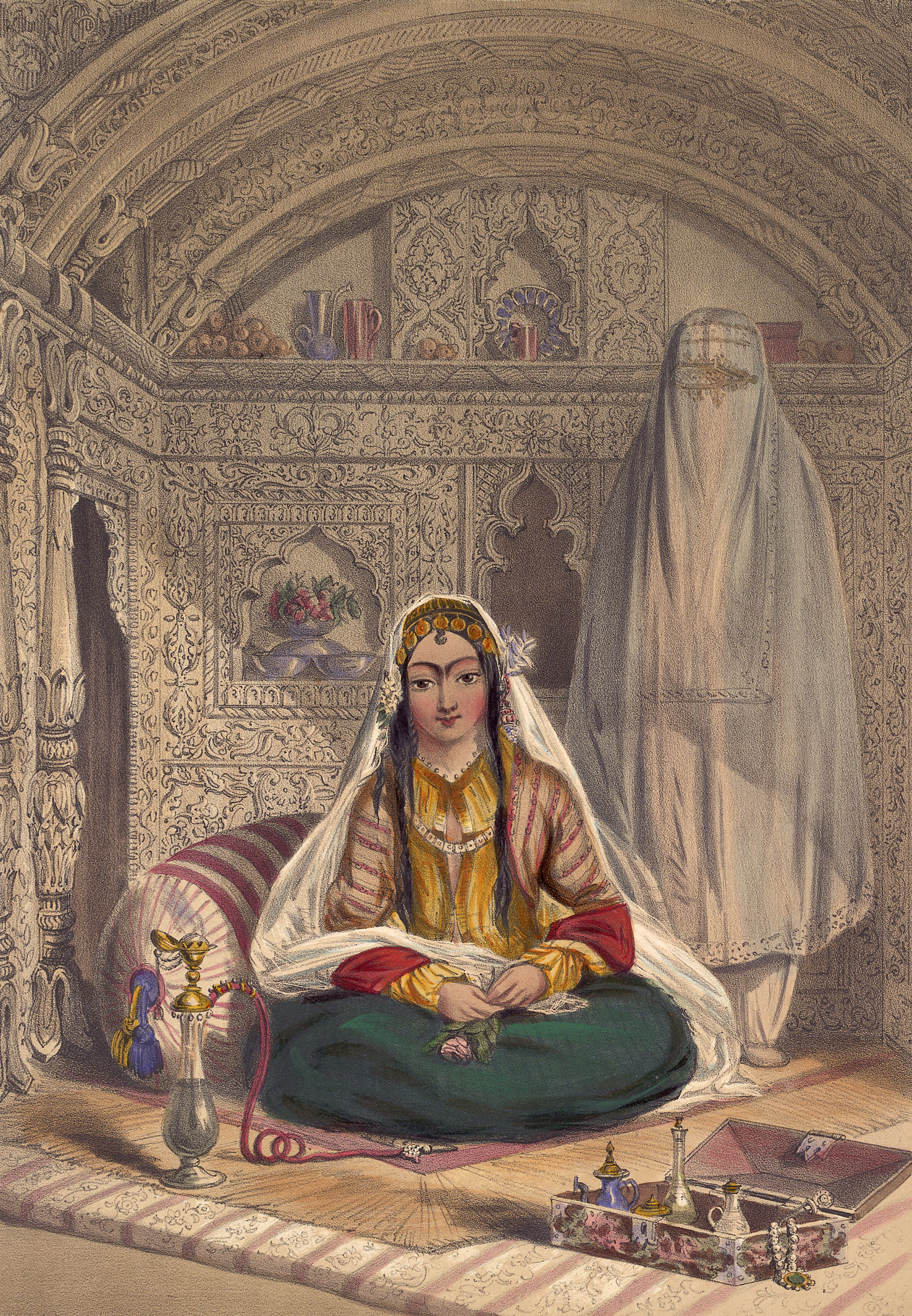
Ladies of Caubul (Kabul, Afghanistan) showing the lifting of purdah in zenana areas – 1848 lithograph by James Rattray, Oriental and India Office Collection, British Library

Freedom of movement is an essential right, recognized by international instruments, including Article 15 (4) of CEDAW. Nevertheless, in many regions of the world, women have this right severely restricted, in law or in practice. For instance, in some countries women may not leave the home without a male guardian, or without the consent of the husband – for example the personal law of Yemen states that a wife must obey her husband and must not get out of the home without his consent. Even in countries which do not have legal restrictions, women's movement may be prevented in practice by social and religious norms such as purdah. Laws restricting women from travelling existed until relatively recently in some Western countries: until 1983, in Australia the passport application of a married woman had to be authorized by her husband.

Several Middle Eastern countries also follow the male guardianship system in the modern era, where women are required to seek permission from the male family member for several things, including traveling to other nations. In August 2019, Saudi Arabia ended its male guardianship laws, allowing women to travel by themselves.

Various practices have been used historically to restrict women's freedom of movement, such as foot binding, the custom of applying painfully tight binding to the feet of young Chinese girls, which was common between the 10th and 20th centuries.

Women's freedom of movement may be restricted by laws, but it may also be restricted by attitudes towards women in public spaces. In areas where it is not socially accepted for women to leave the home, women who are outside may face abuse such as insults, sexual harassment and violence. Many of the restrictions on women's freedom of movement are framed as measures to "protect" women.

=== Informing women about their legal rights ===
The lack of legal knowledge among many women, especially in developing countries, is a major obstacle to the improvement of women's situation. International bodies, such as the United Nations, have stated that the obligation of states does not only consist in passing relevant laws, but also in informing women about the existence of such laws, in order to enable them to seek justice and realize in practice their rights. Therefore, states must popularize the laws, and explain them clearly to the public, in order to prevent ignorance, or misconceptions originating in popular myths, about the laws. The United Nations Development Programme states that, in order to advance gender justice, "Women must know their rights and be able to access legal systems", and the 1993 UN Declaration on the Elimination of Violence Against Women indicates that "States should also inform women of their rights in seeking redress through such mechanisms".

=== Discrimination ===
The United Nations Working Group on business and human rights (WGBHR) has stated that discrimination against women has historically been rooted in patriarchal social norms and power structures. Women's rights movements focus on ending discrimination against women. In this regard, the definition of discrimination itself is important. According to the jurisprudence of the European Court of Human Rights (ECHR), the right to freedom from discrimination includes not only the obligation of states to treat in the same way persons who are in analogous situations, but also the obligation to treat in a different way persons who are in different situations. In this regard, equity, not just "equality" is important. Therefore, states must sometimes differentiate between women and men – through for example offering maternity leave or other legal protections surrounding pregnancy and childbirth (to take into account the biological realities of reproduction), or through acknowledging a specific historical context. For example, acts of violence committed by men against women do not happen in a vacuum, but are part of a social context: in Opuz v Turkey, the ECHR defined violence against women as a form of discrimination against women; this is also the position of the Istanbul Convention which at Article 3 states that "violence against women" is understood as a violation of human rights and a form of discrimination against women [...]".

There are different views on where it is appropriate to differentiate between women and men, and one view is that the act of sexual intercourse is an act where this difference must be acknowledged, both due to the increased physical risks for the woman, and due to the historical context of women being systematically subjected to forced sexual intercourse while in a socially subordinated position (particularly within marriage and during war). States must also differentiate with regard to healthcare by ensuring that women's health – particularly with regard to reproductive health such as pregnancy and childbirth – is not neglected. According to the World Health Organization, "Discrimination in health care settings takes many forms and is often manifested when an individual or group is denied access to health care services that are otherwise available to others. It can also occur through denial of services that are only needed by certain groups, such as women." The refusal of states to acknowledge the specific needs of women, such as the necessity of specific policies like the strong investment of states in reducing maternal mortality can be a form of discrimination. In this regard treating women and men similarly does not work because certain biological aspects such as menstruation, pregnancy, labor, childbirth, and breastfeeding, as well as certain medical conditions, only affect women. The Committee on the Elimination of Discrimination against Women stipulates in its General recommendation No. 35 on gender based violence against women, updating general recommendation No. 19 that states should "Examine gender neutral laws and policies to ensure that they do not create or perpetuate existing inequalities and repeal or modify them if they do so". (paragraph 32). Another example of gender neutral policy which harms women is that where medication tested in medical trials only on men is also used on women assuming that there are no biological differences.

=== Right to health ===
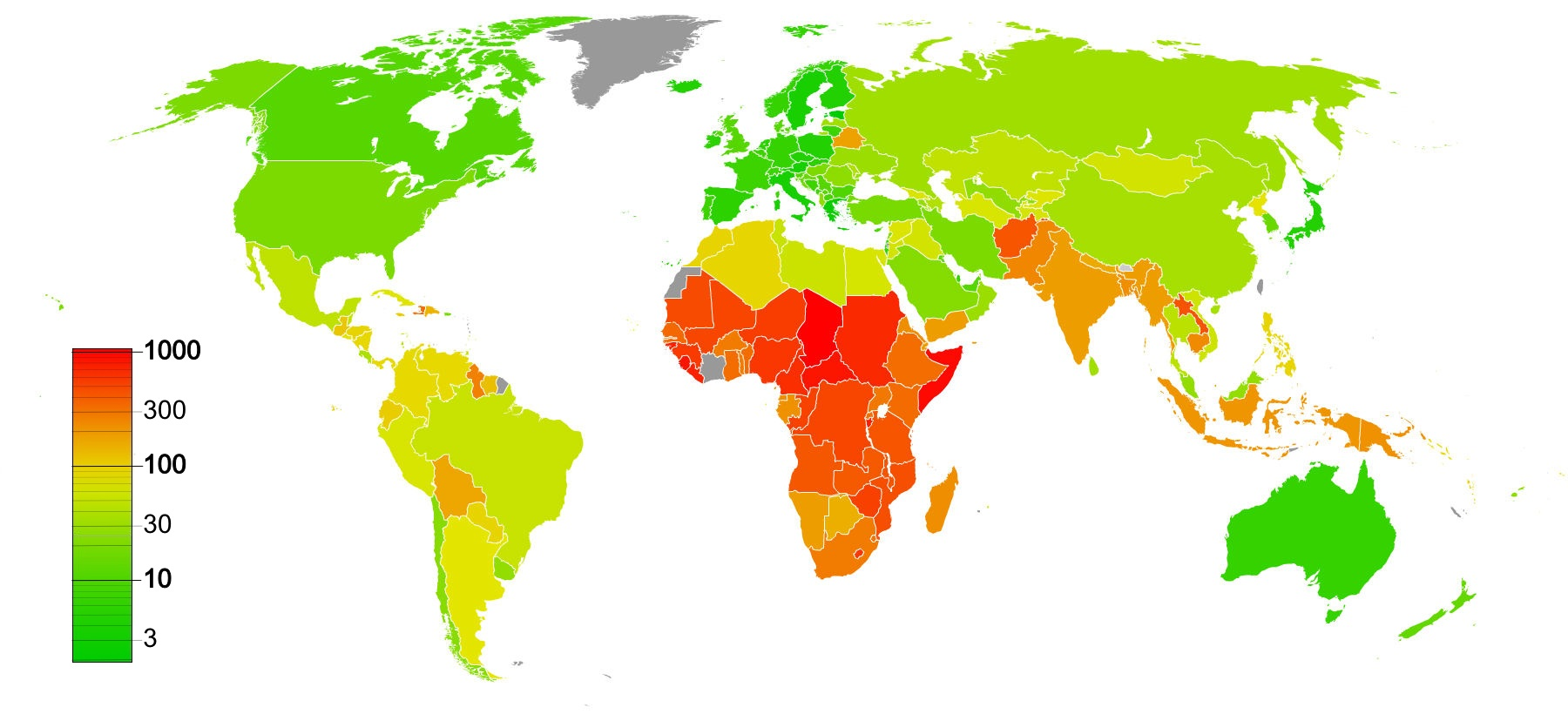
Global maternal mortality rate per 100 000 live births (2010)

FGM in Africa, Iraqi Kurdistan and Yemen, as of 2024 (map of Africa).

Health is defined by the World Health Organization as "a state of complete physical, mental and social well-being and not merely the absence of disease or infirmity". Women's health refers to the health of women, which differs from that of men in many unique ways.

Women's health is severely impaired in some parts of the world, due to factors such as inequality, confinement of women to the home, indifference of medical workers, lack of autonomy of women, and lack of financial resources of women. Discrimination against women occurs also through denial of medical services that are only needed by women. Violations of women's right to health may result in maternal death, accounting for more than 300,000 deaths per year, most of them in developing countries. Certain traditional practices, such as female genital mutilation, also affect women's health. Worldwide, young women and adolescent girls are the population most affected by HIV/AIDS.

There are also historical cases of medical abuse of women, notably the 19th century policy of wrongful confinement of women into insane asylums, often at the request of husbands and male relatives. A notable activist against such practices was Elizabeth Packard, who was wrongfully committed in 1860 by her husband, and filed a lawsuit and won thereafter, highlighted the issue of wrongful involuntary commitment. Another activist was investigative journalist Nellie Bly, who went undercover in 1887, at an asylum in New York City, to expose the terrible conditions that mental patients at the time had to deal with.

=== Right to education ===
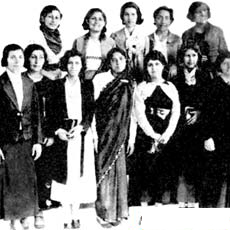
First group of women who entered university in Iran

The right to education is a universal entitlement to education. The Convention Against Discrimination in Education prohibits discrimination in education, with discrimination being defined as "any distinction, exclusion, limitation or preference which, being based on race, colour, sex, language, religion, political or other opinion, national or social origin, economic condition or birth, has the purpose or effect of nullifying or impairing equality of treatment in education". The International Covenant on Economic, Social and Cultural Rights states at Article 3 that "The States Parties to the present Covenant undertake to ensure the equal right of men and women to the enjoyment of all economic, social and cultural rights set forth in the present Covenant", with Article 13 recognizing "the right of everyone to education".

Access to education for women remains limited in some parts of the world. Almost two-thirds of the world's illiterate adults are women.

While women's right to access to academic education is recognized as very important, it is increasingly recognized that academic education must be supplemented with education on human rights, non-discrimination, ethics and gender equality, in order for social advancement to be possible. This was pointed out by Zeid bin Ra'ad, the current United Nations High Commissioner for Human Rights, who stressed the importance of human rights education for all children: "What good was it to humanity that Josef Mengele had advanced degrees in medicine and anthropology, given that he was capable of committing the most inhuman crimes? Eight of the 15 people who planned The Holocaust at Wannsee in 1942 held PhDs. They shone academically, and yet they were profoundly toxic to the world. Radovan Karadžić was a trained psychiatrist. Pol Pot studied radio electronics in Paris. Does this matter, when neither of them showed the smallest shred of ethics and understanding?" There has been increased attention given in recent decades to the raising of student awareness to the importance of gender equality.

=== Reproductive rights ===
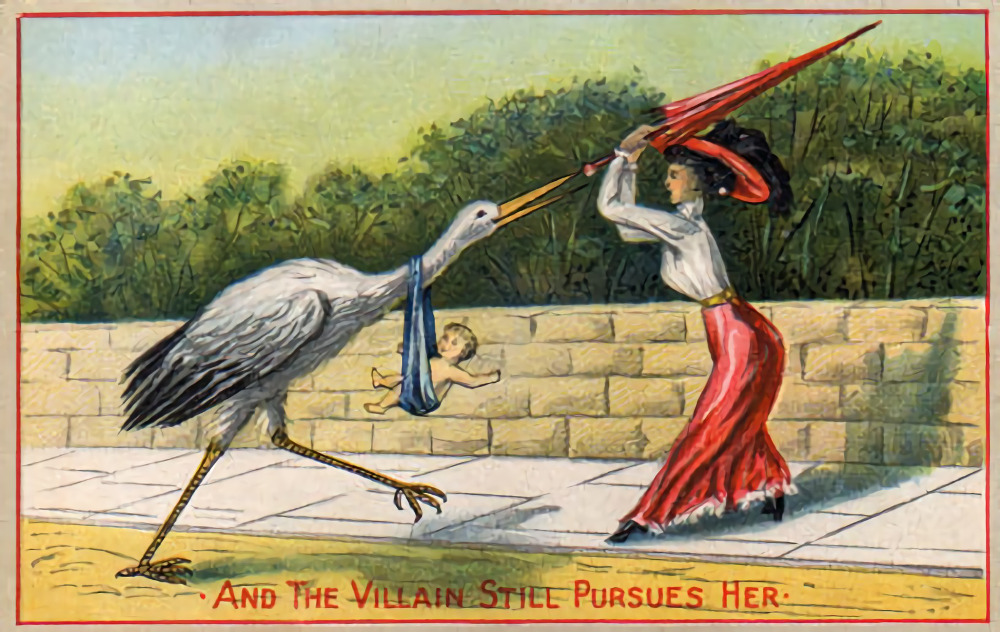
"And the villain still pursues her." Satirical Victorian era postcard.

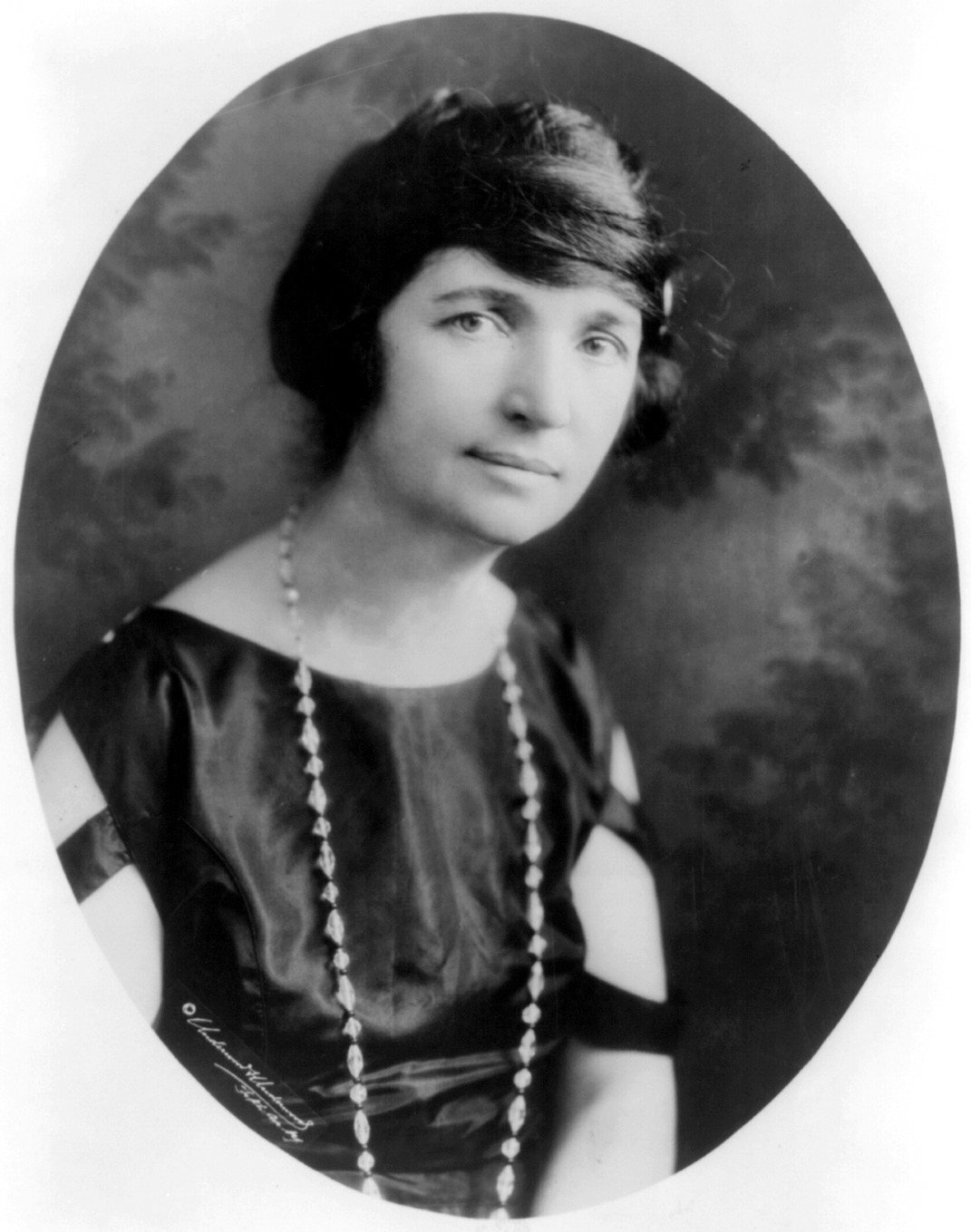
Margaret Sanger

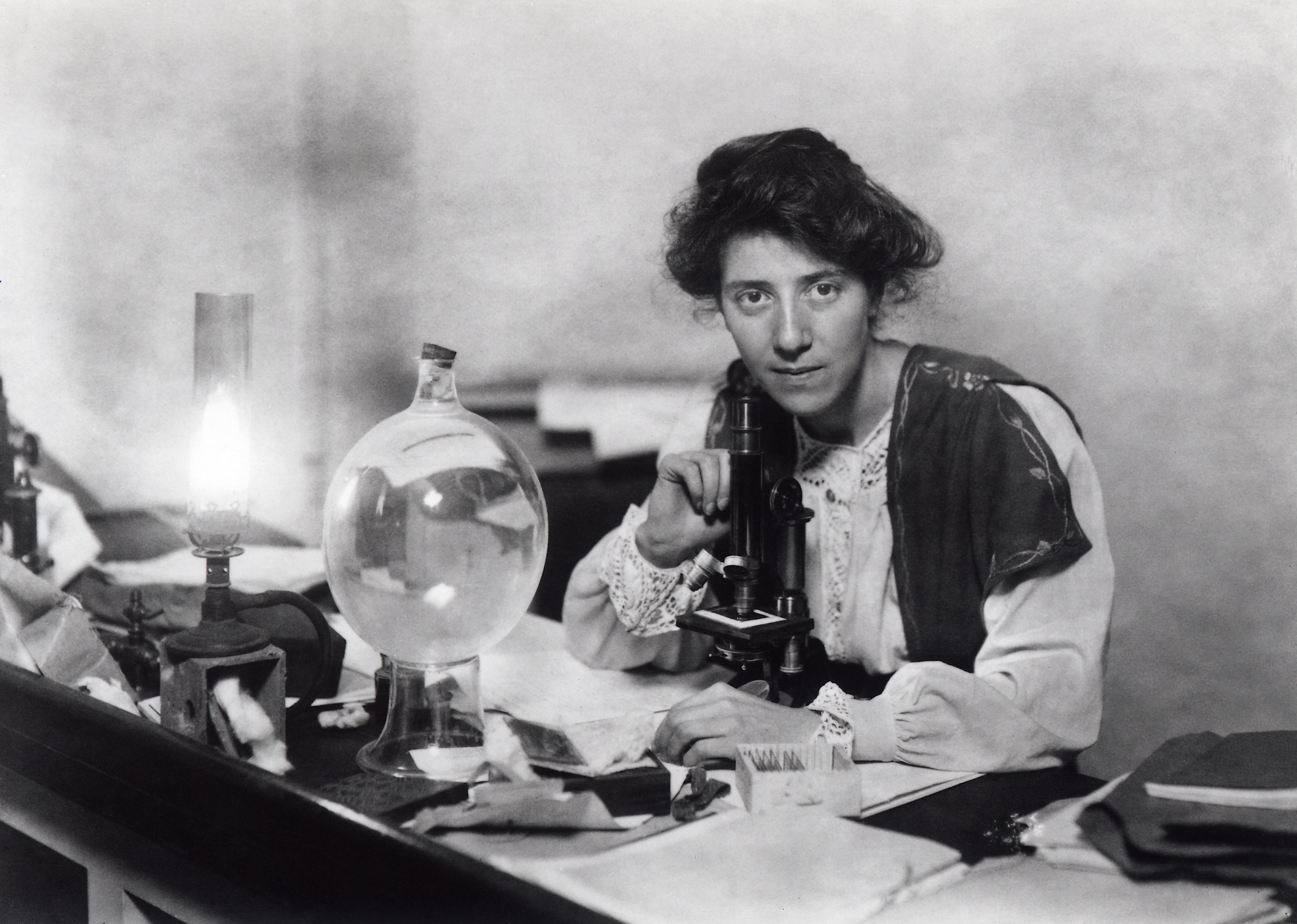
Marie Stopes

Map showing the prevalence of FGM in Africa

==== Legal rights ====
Reproductive rights are legal rights and freedoms relating to reproduction and reproductive health. Reproductive rights were endorsed by the twenty-year Cairo Programme of Action which was adopted in 1994 at the International Conference on Population and Development (ICPD) in Cairo, and by the Beijing Declaration and Beijing Platform for Action in 1995.

In the 1870s feminists advanced the concept of voluntary motherhood as a political critique of involuntary motherhood and expressing a desire for women's emancipation. Advocates for voluntary motherhood disapproved of contraception, arguing that women should only engage in sex for the purpose of procreation and advocated for periodic or permanent abstinence.

Reproductive rights represent a broad concept, that may include some or all of the following rights: the right to legal or safe abortion, the right to control one's reproductive functions, the right to access quality reproductive healthcare, and the right to education and access in order to make reproductive choices free from coercion, discrimination, and violence. Reproductive rights may also be understood to include education about contraception and sexually transmitted infections. Reproductive rights are often defined to include freedom from female genital mutilation (FGM), and forced abortion and forced sterilization. The Istanbul Convention recognizes these two rights at Article 38 – Female genital mutilation and Article 39 – Forced abortion and forced sterilisation.

Reproductive rights are understood as rights of both men and women, but are most frequently advanced as women's rights.

In the 1960s, reproductive rights activists promoted women's right to bodily autonomy, with these social movements leading to the gain of legal access to contraception and abortion during the next decades in many countries.

==== Birth control ====
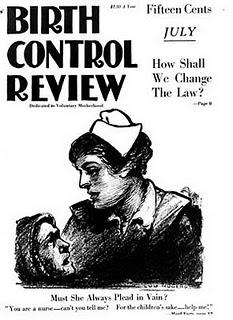
Cover of the 1919 Birth Control Review, published by Margaret Sanger. In relation to "How shall we change the law?" Sanger wrote "...women appeal in vain for instruction concerning contraceptives. Physicians are willing to perform abortions where they are pronounced necessary, but they refuse to direct the use of preventives which would make the abortions unnecessary... "I can't do it – the law does not permit it.""

In the early 20th century birth control was advanced as alternative to the then fashionable terms family limitation and voluntary motherhood. The phrase "birth control" entered the English language in 1914 and was popularised by Margaret Sanger, who was mainly active in the US but had gained an international reputation by the 1930s. The British birth control campaigner Marie Stopes made contraception acceptable in Britain during the 1920s by framing it in scientific terms. Stopes assisted emerging birth control movements in a number of British colonies. The birth control movement advocated for contraception so as to permit sexual intercourse as desired without the risk of pregnancy. By emphasizing control, the birth control movement argued that women should have control over their reproduction, an idea that aligned closely to the theme of the feminist movement. Slogans such as "control over our own bodies" criticised male domination and demanded women's liberation, a connotation that is absent from the family planning, population control and eugenics movements. In the 1960s and 1970s the birth control movement advocated for the legalisation of abortion and large-scale education campaigns about contraception by governments. In the 1980s birth control and population control organisations co-operated in demanding rights to contraception and abortion, with an increasing emphasis on "choice".

Birth control has become a major theme in United States politics. Reproductive issues are cited as examples of women's powerlessness to exercise their rights. The societal acceptance of birth control required the separation of sex from procreation, making birth control a highly controversial subject in the 20th century. Birth control in the United States has become an arena for conflict between liberal and conservative values, raising questions about family, personal freedom, state intervention, religion in politics, sexual morality and social welfare. Reproductive rights, that is, rights relating to sexual reproduction and reproductive health, were first discussed as a subset of human rights at the United Nations' 1968 International Conference on Human Rights.

==== Abortion ====
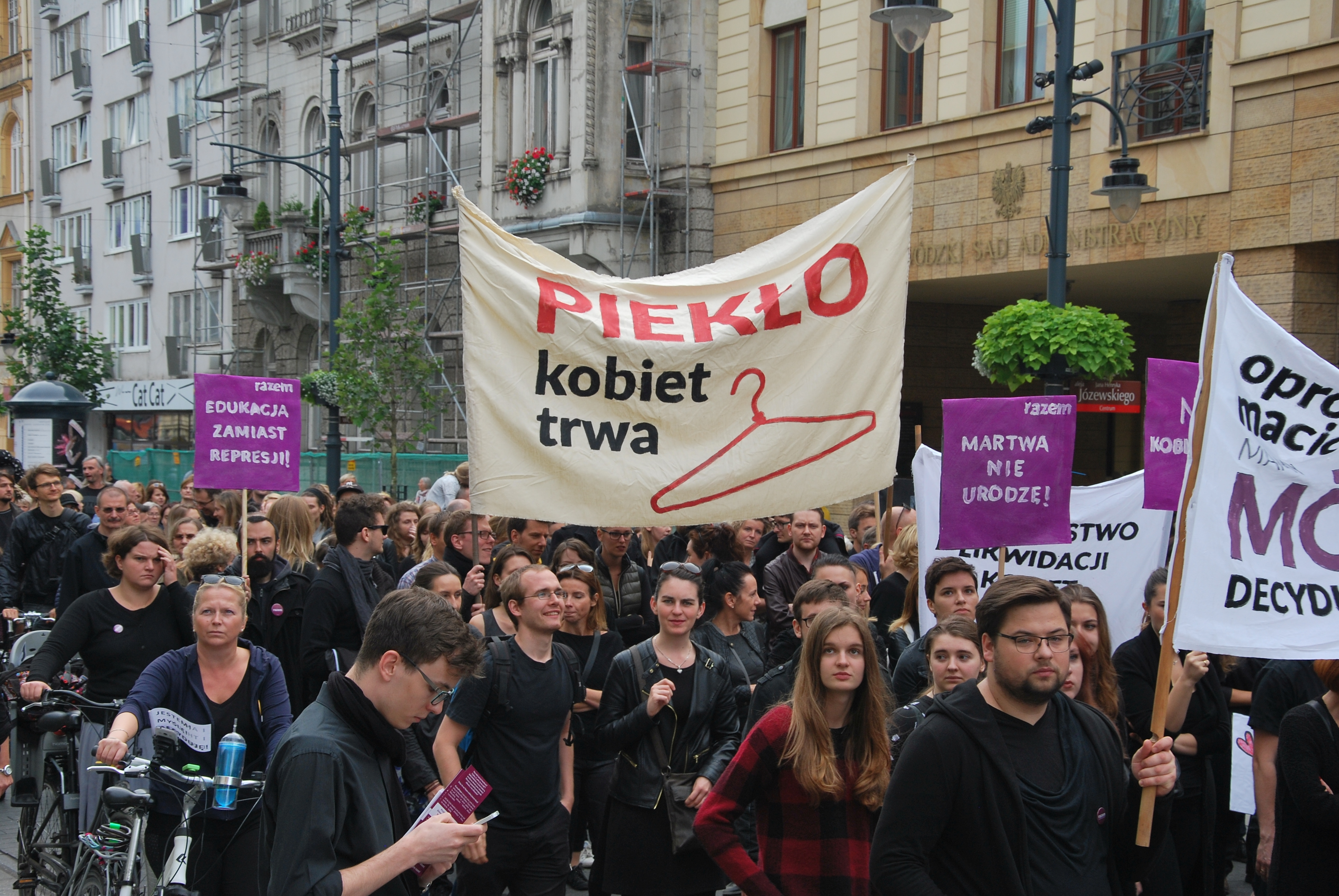
Access to abortion services varies considerably throughout the world, with the status of related rights being an active and major political topic in many nations.

Women's reproductive rights may be understood as including the right to easy access to a safe and legal abortion. Abortion laws vary from a full prohibition (the Dominican Republic, El Salvador, Malta, Nicaragua, the Vatican) to countries such as Canada, where there are no legal restrictions. In many countries where abortion is permitted by law, women may only have limited access to safe abortion services. In some countries, abortion is permitted only to save the pregnant woman's life, or if the pregnancy resulted from rape or incest. There are also countries where the law is liberal, but in practice it is very difficult to have an abortion, due to most doctors being conscientious objectors. The fact that in some countries where abortion is legal it is de facto very difficult to have access to one is controversial; the UN in its 2017 resolution on Intensification of efforts to prevent and eliminate all forms of violence against women and girls: domestic violence urged states to guarantee access to "safe abortion where such services are permitted by national law".

The Committee on the Elimination of Discrimination against Women considers the criminalization of abortion a "violations of women's sexual and reproductive health and rights" and a form of "gender based violence"; paragraph 18 of its General recommendation No. 35 on gender based violence against women, updating general recommendation No. 19 states that: "Violations of women's sexual and reproductive health and rights, such as forced sterilizations, forced abortion, forced pregnancy, criminalisation of abortion, denial or delay of safe abortion and post abortion care, forced continuation of pregnancy, abuse and mistreatment of women and girls seeking sexual and reproductive health information, goods and services, are forms of gender based violence that, depending on the circumstances, may amount to torture or cruel, inhuman or degrading treatment." The same General Recommendation also urges countries at paragraph 31 to [...] In particular, repeal: a) Provisions that allow, tolerate or condone forms of gender based violence against women, including [...] legislation that criminalises abortion".

According to Human Rights Watch, "Abortion is a highly emotional subject and one that excites deeply held opinions. However, equitable access to safe abortion services is first and foremost a human right. Where abortion is safe and legal, no one is forced to have one. Where abortion is illegal and unsafe, women are forced to carry unwanted pregnancies to term or suffer serious health consequences and even death. Approximately 13% of maternal deaths worldwide are attributable to unsafe abortion—between 68,000 and 78,000 deaths annually." According to Human Rights Watch, "the denial of a pregnant woman's right to make an independent decision regarding abortion violates or poses a threat to a wide range of human rights." African American women are five times more likely to have an abortion than a white woman.

The Catholic Church and many other Christian faiths, particularly those considered the Christian right, and most Orthodox Jews regard abortion not as a right, but as a moral evil and a mortal sin.

Russia was the first country to legalise abortions and offer free medical care in state hospitals to do so. After the October Revolution, the Women's wing of the Bolshevik Party (the Zhenotdel) persuaded the Bolsheviks to legalise abortion (as a 'temporary measure'). The Bolsheviks legalised abortion in November 1920. This was the first time in world history that women had won the right to free abortions in state hospitals.

==== Abuse during childbirth ====
The abuse of women during childbirth is a recently identified global problem and a basic violation of a woman's rights. Abuse during childbirth is the neglect, physical abuse and lack of respect during childbirth. This treatment is regarded as a violation of woman's rights. It also has the effect of preventing women from seeking pre-natal care and using other health care services.

==== Child marriage ====
Birth rates per 1,000 women aged 15–19 years, worldwide

Child marriage is a practice which is widespread across the world, and is often connected to poverty and gender inequality. Child marriage endangers the reproductive health of young girls, leading to an increased risk of complications in pregnancy or childbirth. Such complications are a leading cause of death among girls in developing countries.

==== Forced pregnancy ====
Forced pregnancy is the practice of forcing a woman or girl to become pregnant, often as part of a forced marriage, including by means of bride kidnapping, through rape (including marital rape, war rape and genocidal rape) or as part of a program of breeding slaves (see Slave breeding in the United States). It is a form of reproductive coercion, was common historically, and still occurs in parts of the world. In the 20th century, state-mandated forced marriage with the aim of increasing the population was practiced by some authoritarian governments, notably during the Khmer Rouge regime in Cambodia, which systematically forced people into marriages ordering them to have children, in order to increase the population and continue the revolution. Forced pregnancy is strongly connected to the custom of bride price.

=== Freedom from violence ===
Violence against women is, collectively, violent acts that are primarily or exclusively committed against women. The UN Declaration on the Elimination of Violence Against Women states, "violence against women is a manifestation of historically unequal power relations between men and women" and "violence against women is one of the crucial social mechanisms by which women are forced into a subordinate position compared with men." The Council of Europe Convention on preventing and combating violence against women and domestic violence, also known as the Istanbul Convention, provides the following definition of violence against women: "violence against women" is understood as a violation of human rights and a form of discrimination against women and shall mean all acts of gender-based violence that result in, or are likely to result in, physical, sexual, psychological or economic harm or suffering to women, including threats of such acts, coercion or arbitrary deprivation of liberty, whether occurring in public or in private life". Violence against women may be perpetrated by individuals, by groups, or by the State. It may occur in private or in public. It may occur off line or online as, for example, for Ethiopian feminists facing digital gender-based violence. Violence against women may be sexual violence, physical violence, psychological violence, or socioeconomic violence. Some forms of violence against women have long cultural traditions: honor killings, dowry violence, female genital mutilation. Violence against women is considered by the World Health Organization "a major public health problem and a violation of women's human rights."

=== Family law ===
Emancipation of women by country

Under male-dominated family law, women had few, if any, rights, being under the control of the husband or male relatives. Legal concepts that existed throughout the centuries, such as coverture, marital power, Head and Master laws, kept women under the strict control of their husbands. Restrictions from marriage laws also extended to public life, such as marriage bars. Practices such as dowry, bride price or bride service were, and still are to this day in some parts of the world, very common. Some countries continue to require to this day a male guardian for women, without whom women cannot exercise civil rights. Other harmful practices include marriage of young girls, often to much older men.

In many legal systems, the husband had complete power over the family; for example, in Franco's Spain, although women's role was defined as that of a homemaker who had to largely avoid the public sphere in order to take care of the children, the legal rights over the children belonged to the father; until 1970 the husband could give a family's child to adoption without the consent of his wife. Until 1975, women in Spain needed their husband's permission (referred to as permiso marital) for many activities, including employment, traveling away from home, and property ownership. Switzerland was one of the last European countries to establish gender equality in marriage: married women's rights were severely restricted until 1988, when legal reforms providing gender equality in marriage, abolishing the legal authority of the husband, came into force (these reforms had been approved in 1985 by voters in a referendum, who narrowly voted in favor with 54.7% of voters approving).

Another area of interest for feminists has been adultery laws, due to the extreme legal and social differences between the way female and male adultery was treated in criminal law and family law in many cultures, with the former being subjected to severe punishments, up to the death penalty, and violent repression such as honor killings, while the latter was often tolerated, even encouraged as a symbol of male social status. In Europe, this was especially true in Southern Europe, and honor killings were also historically common in this region, and "there have been acts of 'honour' killings within living memory within Mediterranean countries such as Italy and Greece." The tradition in French culture for upper-class men to have mistresses, coupled with the toleration for crimes of passion (French: crime passionnel) committed against unfaithful wives illustrates these norms, which were also supported by the French Penal Code of 1810 (which provided for leniency for husbands who killed their wives caught committing adultery, but not for wives who killed their husbands under similar circumstances, and which treated female and male adultery differently, which remained in force until 1975). Similar norms existed in Spain (crimes of passion until 1963, and adultery – defined differently for women and men – until 1978).

== Modern movements ==
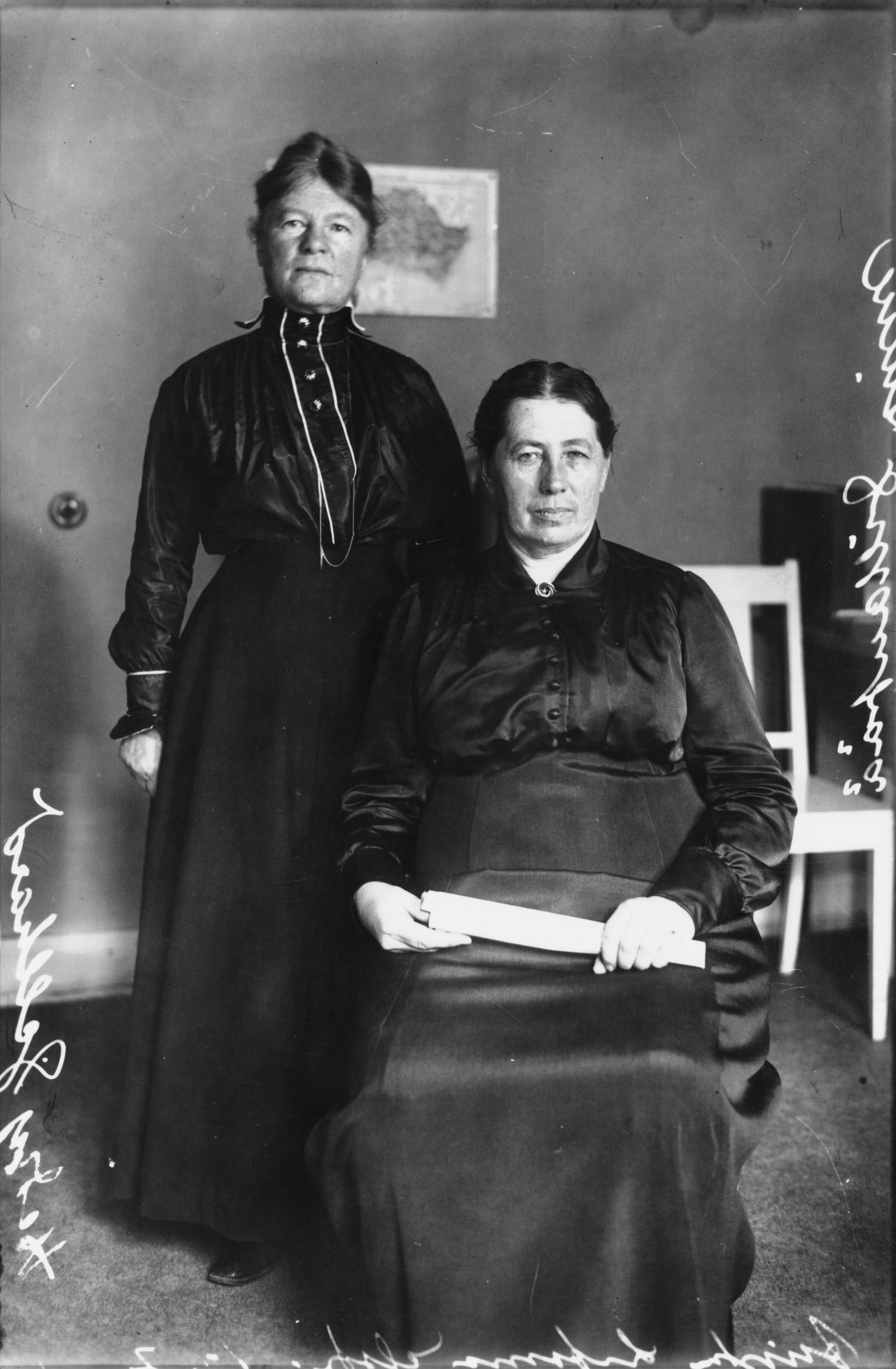
Finland's first female ministers were brought to Finnish Parliament shortly after the turn of the 20th century.

External videos
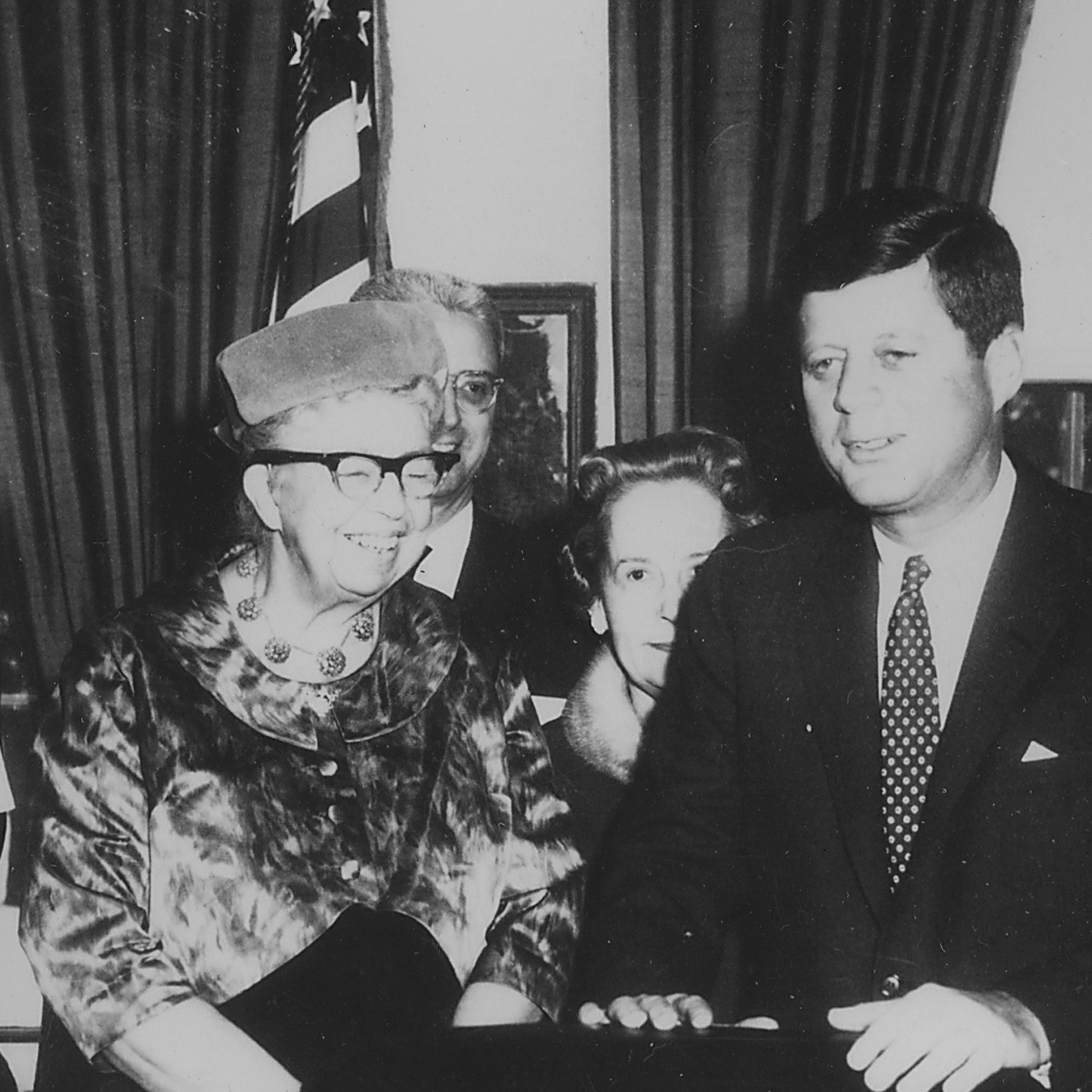
- Prospects of Mankind with Eleanor Roosevelt; What Status For Women?, 59:07, 1962. Eleanor Roosevelt, chair of the Presidential Commission on the Status of Women, interviews President John F. Kennedy, Secretary of Labor Arthur Goldberg and others, Open Vault from WGBH.

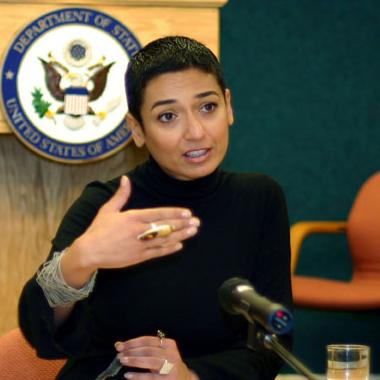
Iraqi-American writer and activist Zainab Salbi, the founder of Women for Women International

In the subsequent decades women's rights again became an important issue in the English-speaking world. By the 1960s the movement was called "feminism" or "women's liberation." Reformers wanted the same pay as men, equal rights in law, and the freedom to plan their families or not have children at all. Their efforts were met with mixed results.

The International Council of Women (ICW) was the first women's organization to work across national boundaries for the common cause of advocating human rights for women. In March and April 1888, women leaders came together in Washington, D.C., with 80 speakers and 49 delegates representing 53 women's organizations from 9 countries: Canada, the United States, Ireland, India, England, Finland, Denmark, France and Norway. Women from professional organizations, trade unions, arts groups and benevolent societies participate. National Councils are affiliated with the ICW and thus make themselves heard at the international level. In 1904, the ICW met in Berlin, Germany. The ICW worked with the League of Nations during the 1920s and the United Nations post-World War II. Today the ICW holds Consultative Status with the United Nations Economic and Social Council, the highest accreditation an NGO can achieve at the United Nations. Currently, it is composed of 70 countries and has a headquarters in Lasaunne, Switzerland. International meetings are held every three years.

In the UK, a public groundswell of opinion in favour of legal equality had gained pace, partly through the extensive employment of women in what were traditional male roles during both world wars. By the 1960s the legislative process was being readied, tracing through MP Willie Hamilton's select committee report, his equal pay for equal work bill, the creation of a Sex Discrimination Board, Lady Sear's draft sex anti-discrimination bill, a government Green Paper of 1973, until 1975 when the first British Sex Discrimination Act, an Equal Pay Act, and an Equal Opportunities Commission came into force. With encouragement from the UK government, the other countries of the EEC soon followed suit with an agreement to ensure that discrimination laws would be phased out across the European Community.

In the US, the National Organization for Women (NOW) was created in 1966 with the purpose of bringing about equality for all women. NOW was one important group that fought for the Equal Rights Amendment (ERA). This amendment stated that "equality of rights under the law shall not be denied or abridged by the United States or any state on account of sex." But there was disagreement on how the proposed amendment would be understood. Supporters believed it would guarantee women equal treatment. But critics feared it might deny women the right to be financially supported by their husbands. The amendment died in 1982 because not enough states had ratified it. ERAs have been included in subsequent Congresses, but have still failed to be ratified.

Women for Women International (WfWI) is a nonprofit humanitarian organization that provides practical and moral support to women survivors of war. WfWI helps such women rebuild their lives after war's devastation through a year-long tiered program that begins with direct financial aid and emotional counseling and includes life skills (e.g., literacy, numeracy) training if necessary, rights awareness education, health education, job skills training and small business development. The organization was co-founded in 1993.

The National Council of Women of Canada (Conseil national des femmes du Canada), is a Canadian advocacy organization based in Ottawa aimed at improving conditions for women, families, and communities. A federation of nationally organized societies of men and women and local and provincial councils of women, it is the Canadian member of the International Council of Women (ICW). The council has concerned itself in areas including women's suffrage, immigration, health care, education, mass media, the environment, and many others. Formed on 27 October 1857 in Toronto, Ontario, it is one of the oldest advocacy organizations in the country.

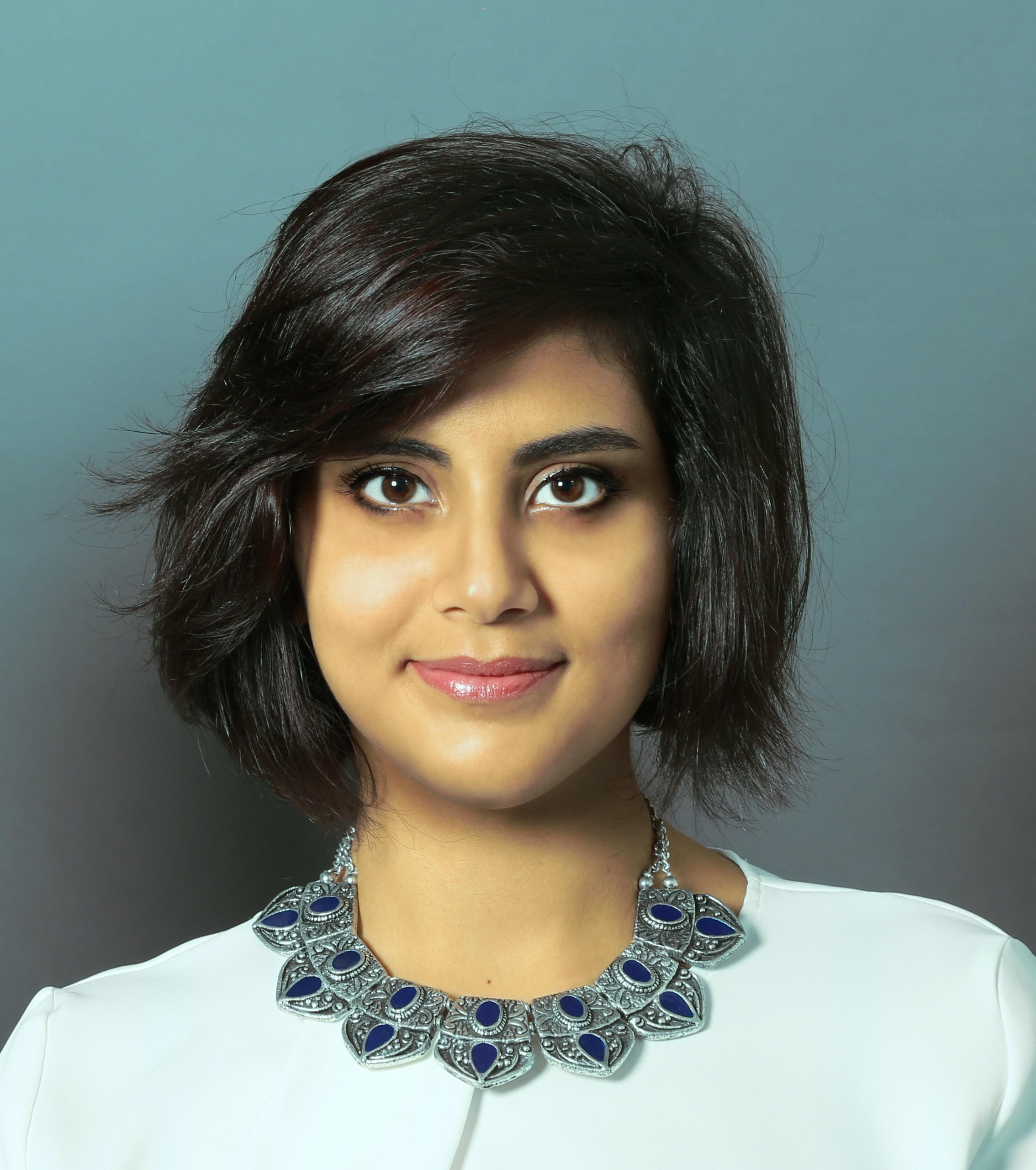
Saudi women's rights activist Loujain al-Hathloul was arrested in May 2018, along with 10 other women's rights activists in Saudi Arabia.

The Association for the Protection and Defense of Women's Rights in Saudi Arabia is a Saudi non-governmental organization founded to provide activism for women's rights. It was founded by Wajeha al-Huwaider and Fawzia Al-Uyyouni, and grew out of a 2007 movement to gain women the right to drive. The association is not officially licensed by the government of Saudi Arabia, and has been warned not to mount demonstrations. In a 2007 interview, al-Huwaider described the goals: "representation for women in shari'a courts; setting a [minimum] age for girls' marriages; allowing women to take care of their own affairs in government agencies and allowing them to enter government buildings; protecting women from domestic violence, such as physical or verbal violence, or keeping her from studies, work, or marriage, or forcing her to divorce..."

In Ukraine, FEMEN was founded in 2008. The organisation is internationally known for its topless protests against sex tourists, international marriage agencies, sexism and other social, national and international social illnesses. FEMEN has sympathisers groups in many European countries through social media.

=== United Nations and World Conferences ===
In 1946 the United Nations established a Commission on the Status of Women. Originally as the Section on the Status of Women, Human Rights Division, Department of Social Affairs, and now part of the Economic and Social Council (ECOSOC). Since 1975 the UN has held a series of world conferences on women's issues, starting with the World Conference of the International Women's Year in Mexico City. These conferences created an international forum for women's rights, but also illustrated divisions between women of different cultures and the difficulties of attempting to apply principles universally. Four World Conferences have been held, the first in Mexico City (International Women's Year, 1975), the second in Copenhagen (1980) and the third in Nairobi (1985).

At the Fourth World Conference on Women in Beijing (1995), The Platform for Action was signed. This included a commitment to achieve "gender equality and the empowerment of women". The same commitment was reaffirmed by all U.N. member nations at the Millennium Summit in 2000 and was reflected in the Millennium Development Goals to be achieved by 2015.

In 2010, UN Women was founded through the merging of the Division for the Advancement of Women, the International Research and Training Institute for the Advancement of Women, the Office of the Special Adviser or Gender Issues Advancement of Women and the United Nations Development Fund for Women by General Assembly Resolution 63/311.

=== International women's rights ===
Compared to the Western women's rights movements, international women's rights are plagued with different issues. While it is called international women's rights, it is also can be known as third-world feminism. International women's rights deal with issues such as marriage, sexual slavery, forced child marriage, and female genital mutilation. According to the organization, EQUAL MEANS EQUAL, "the United Nations come horrifying statistics: Victims of female genital mutilation – a ritual to remove a young girl's clitoris to ensure her fidelity – number 130 million. Some 60 million girls become 'child brides,' forced to marry, sometimes after being kidnapped and raped". Something that has been created to combat such things is the Convention on the Elimination of All Forms of Discrimination Against Women. It was set in place to help against discrimination in education, marriage, sexual violence, and politics. While this does not only pertain to non-western countries, 193 states have ratified it. Some of the countries that have opposed it include Iran, Palau, Somalia, North and South Sudan, Tonga, and the United States.

=== World Bank ===
A 2019 report from the World Bank found that women have full legal rights to men in only six countries: Belgium, Denmark, France, Latvia, Luxembourg and Sweden.

=== Woman, Life, Freedom ===
Kurdistani Iraqi women and Iranian women used this movement, in 2021 and 2022, in an anti-government uprising.

== Human rights ==
=== United Nations convention ===
Participation in the CEDAW: Signed and ratified Acceded or succeeded Unrecognized state, abiding by treaty / Only signed Non-signatory

The Universal Declaration of Human Rights, adopted in 1948, enshrines "the equal rights of men and women", and addressed both equality and equity issues. In 1979, the United Nations General Assembly adopted the Convention on the Elimination of All Forms of Discrimination against Women (CEDAW) for legal implementation of the Declaration on the Elimination of Discrimination against Women. Described as an international bill of rights for women, it came into force on 3 September 1981. The UN member states that have not ratified the convention are Iran, Palau, Somalia, Sudan, Tonga, and the United States. Niue and the Vatican City, which are non-member states, have also not ratified it. The latest state to become a party to the convention is South Sudan, on 30 April 2015.

The Convention defines discrimination against women in the following terms:

Any distinction, exclusion or restriction made on the basis of sex which has the effect or purpose of impairing or nullifying the recognition, enjoyment or exercise by women, irrespective of their marital status, on a basis of equality of men and women, of human rights and fundamental freedoms in the political, economic, social, cultural, civil or any other field.

It also establishes an agenda of action for putting an end to sex-based discrimination for which states ratifying the convention are required to enshrine gender equality into their domestic legislation, repeal all discriminatory provisions in their laws, and enact new provisions to guard against discrimination against women. They must also establish tribunals and public institutions to guarantee women effective protection against discrimination, and take steps to eliminate all forms of discrimination practiced against women by individuals, organizations, and enterprises.

=== Marriage, divorce, and family law ===
Article 16 of the Universal Declaration of Human Rights enshrines the right of consenting men and women to marry and found a family.

(1) Men and women of full age, without any limitation due to race, nationality or religion, have the right to marry and to found a family. They are entitled to equal rights as to marriage, during marriage and at its dissolution.

(2) Marriage shall be entered into only with the free and full consent of the intending spouses.

(3) The family is the natural and fundamental group unit of society and is entitled to protection by society and the State.

Article 16 of CEDAW stipulates that, "1. States Parties shall take all appropriate measures to eliminate discrimination against women in all matters relating to marriage and family relations". Among the rights included are a woman's right to freely and consensually choose her spouse; to have parental rights to her children irrespective of her marital status; the right of a married woman to choose a profession or an occupation, and to have property rights within marriage. In addition to these, "The betrothal and the marriage of a child shall have no legal effect".

Polygamous marriage is a controversial practice, prevalent in some parts of the world. The general recommendations made by the Committee on the Elimination of Discrimination against Women, state in General Recommendation No. 21, Equality in marriage and family relations: "Polygamous marriage contravenes a woman's right to equality with men, and can have such serious emotional and financial consequences for her and her dependents that such marriages ought to be discouraged and prohibited."

Cohabitation of unmarried couples as well as single mothers are common in some parts the world. The Human Rights Committee has stated:

27. In giving effect to recognition of the family in the context of article 23, it is important to accept the concept of the various forms of family, including unmarried couples and their children and single parents and their children and to ensure the equal treatment of women in these contexts (General Comment 19 paragraph 2 last sentence). Single parent families frequently consist of a single woman caring for one or more children, and States parties should describe what measures of support are in place to enable her to discharge her parental functions on the basis of equality with a man in a similar position.

=== Vienna Declaration and Programme of Action ===
The Vienna Declaration and Programme of Action (VDPA) is a human rights declaration adopted by consensus at the World Conference on Human Rights on 25 June 1993 in Vienna, Austria. This declaration recognizes women's rights as being protected human rights. Paragraph 18 reads:

The human rights of women and of the girl-child are an inalienable, integral and indivisible part of universal human rights. The full and equal participation of women in political, civil, economic, social and cultural life, at the national, regional and international levels, and the eradication of all forms of discrimination on grounds of sex are priority objectives of the international community.

=== United Nations Security Council Resolution 1325 ===
On 31 October 2000, the United Nations Security Council unanimously adopted United Nations Security Council Resolution 1325, the first formal and legal document from the United Nations Security Council that requires all states to fully respect international humanitarian law and international human rights law applicable to the rights and protection of women and girls during and after the armed conflicts.

=== Regional conventions ===
Belém do Pará Convention, Maputo Protocol and Istanbul Convention participation combined. Signed and ratified Acceded or succeeded Only signed Not signed Not a member state of the AU, CoE or OAS

The Inter-American Convention on the Prevention, Punishment, and Eradication of Violence against Women, better known as the Belém do Pará Convention, was adopted by the Organization of American States on 9 June 1994. As of March 2020, 32 of the 34 or 35 member states of the Organization of American States have either signed and ratified or acceded to the Belém do Pará Convention; only Canada, Cuba and the United States have not. (Note: The OAS membership status of Cuba is currently unclear, see Cuba–OAS relations. This leads some sources to count Cuba as one of the 35 OAS member states, while other sources assert that there are only 34 OAS member states. Either way, and although non-OAS states are allowed to accede to the treaty, Cuba has neither signed nor ratified nor acceded to the Belém do Pará Convention.)

The Protocol to the African Charter on Human and Peoples' Rights on the Rights of Women in Africa, better known as the Maputo Protocol, was adopted by the African Union on 11 July 2003 at its second summit in Maputo, Mozambique. On 25 November 2005, having been ratified by the required 15 member nations of the African Union, the protocol entered into force. The protocol guarantees comprehensive rights to women including the right to take part in the political process, to social and political equality with men, and to control of their reproductive health, and an end to female genital mutilation.

The Convention on preventing and combating violence against women and domestic violence, better known as the Istanbul Convention, was adopted by the Council of Europe on 11 May 2011. As of June 2020, the treaty has been signed by 45/47 Council of Europe member states and the European Union; 34 of the signatories have also ratified the convention.

== Violence against women ==
=== United Nations Declaration ===
The Declaration on the Elimination of Violence Against Women was adopted by the United Nations in 1993. It defines violence against women as "any act of gender-based violence that results in, or is likely to result in, physical, sexual or psychological harm or suffering to women, including threats of such acts, coercion or arbitrary deprivation of liberty, whether occurring in public or in private life." This resolution established that women have a right to be free from violence. As a consequence of the resolution, in 1999, the General Assembly declared the day of 25 November to be the International Day for the Elimination of Violence against Women.

Article 2 of The Declaration on the Elimination of Violence Against Women outlines several forms of violence against women:

Article Two:

Violence against women shall be understood to encompass, but not be limited to, the following:

(a) Physical, sexual and psychological violence occurring in the family, including battering, sexual abuse of female children in the household, dowry-related violence, marital rape, female genital mutilation and other traditional practices harmful to women, non-spousal violence and violence related to exploitation;
(b) Physical, sexual and psychological violence occurring within the general community, including rape, sexual abuse, sexual harassment and intimidation at work, in educational institutions and elsewhere, trafficking in women and forced prostitution;
(c) Physical, sexual and psychological violence perpetrated or condoned by the State, wherever it occurs.

=== Istanbul Conventions ===
The Council of Europe Convention on preventing and combating violence against women and domestic violence, also known as the Istanbul Convention, is the first legally binding instrument in Europe in the field of domestic violence and violence against women, and came into force in 2014. Countries which ratify it must ensure that the forms of violence defined in its text are outlawed. In its Preamble, the Convention states that "the realisation of de jure and de facto equality between women and men is a key element in the prevention of violence against women". The convention also provides a definition of domestic violence as "all acts of physical, sexual, psychological or economic violence that occur within the family or domestic unit or between former or current spouses or partners, whether or not the perpetrator shares or has shared the same residence with the victim". Although it is a Convention of the Council of Europe, it is open to accession by any country.

=== Rape and sexual violence ===
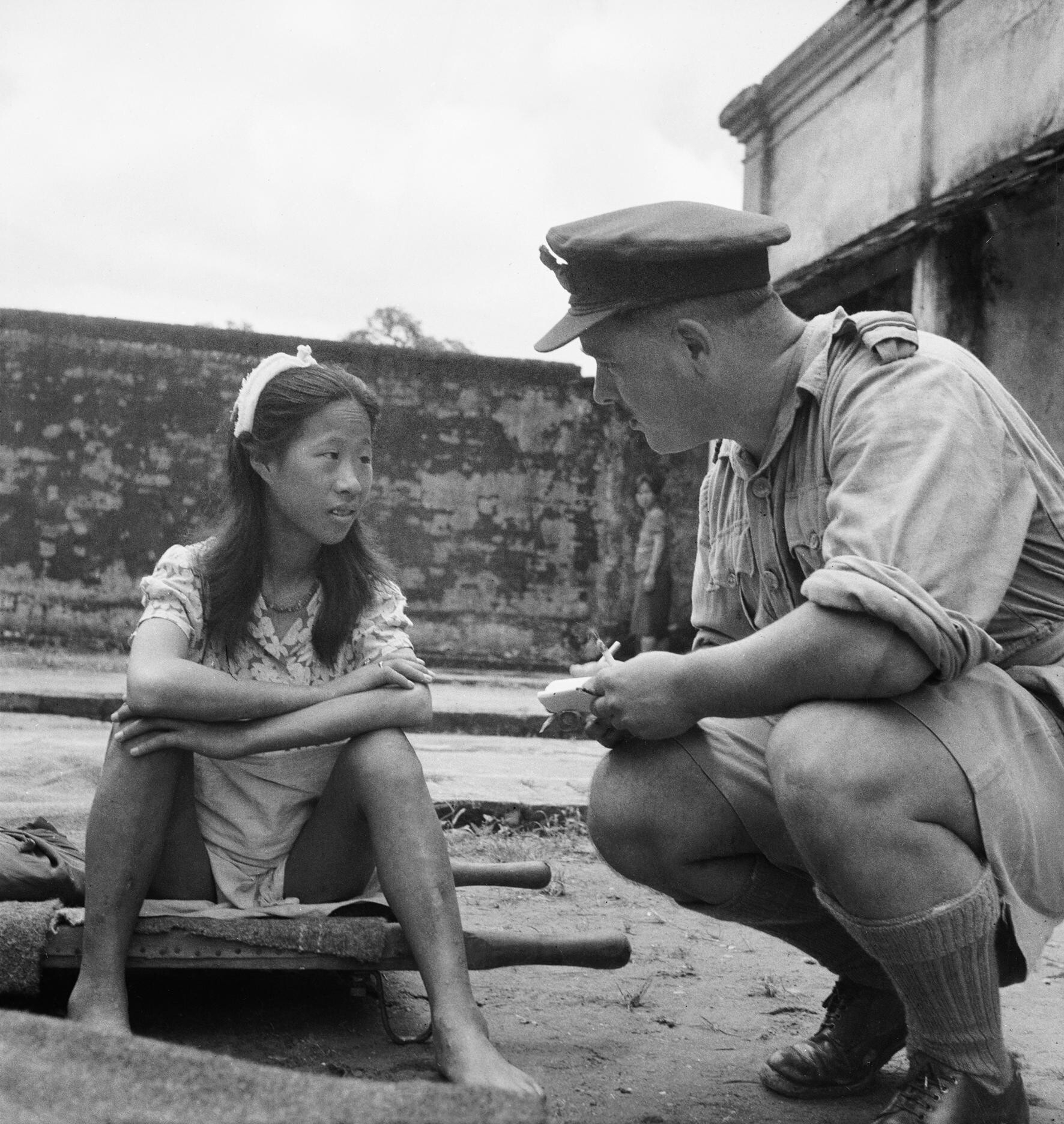
A young ethnic Chinese woman who was in one of the Imperial Japanese Army's "comfort battalions" is interviewed by an Allied officer (see Comfort women).

Rape, sometimes called sexual assault, is an assault by a person involving sexual intercourse with or sexual penetration of another person without that person's consent. Rape is generally considered a serious sex crime as well as a civil assault. When part of a widespread and systematic practice, rape and sexual slavery are now recognised as a crime against humanity as well as a war crime. Rape is also now recognised as a form of genocide when committed with the intent to destroy, in whole or in part, a targeted group.

==== As genocide ====
In 1998, the International Criminal Tribunal for Rwanda established by the United Nations made landmark decisions that rape is a crime of genocide under international law. The trial of Jean-Paul Akayesu, the mayor of Taba Commune in Rwanda, established precedents that rape is an element of the crime of genocide. The Akayesu judgement includes the first interpretation and application by an international court of the 1948 Convention on the Prevention and Punishment of the Crime of Genocide. The Trial Chamber held that rape, which it defined as "a physical invasion of a sexual nature committed on a person under circumstances which are coercive", and sexual assault constitute acts of genocide insofar as they were committed with the intent to destroy, in whole or in part, a targeted group. It found that sexual assault formed an integral part of the process of destroying the Tutsi ethnic group and that the rape was systematic and had been perpetrated against Tutsi women only, manifesting the specific intent required for those acts to constitute genocide.

Judge Navanethem Pillay said in a statement after the verdict: "From time immemorial, rape has been regarded as one of the spoils of war. Now it will be considered a war crime. We want to send out a strong message that rape is no longer a trophy of war." An estimated 500,000 women were raped during the 1994 Rwandan Genocide.

==== As a crime against humanity ====
The Rome Statute Explanatory Memorandum, which defines the jurisdiction of the International Criminal Court, recognises rape, sexual slavery, enforced prostitution, forced pregnancy, enforced sterilization, "or any other form of sexual violence of comparable gravity" as a crime against humanity if the action is part of a widespread or systematic practice. The Vienna Declaration and Programme of Action also condemn systematic rape as well as murder, sexual slavery, and forced pregnancy.

Rape was first recognised as a crime against humanity when the International Criminal Tribunal for the former Yugoslavia issued arrest warrants based on the Geneva Conventions and Violations of the Laws or Customs of War. Specifically, it was recognised that Muslim women in Foca (southeastern Bosnia and Herzegovina) were subjected to systematic and widespread gang rape, torture, and sexual enslavement by Bosnian Serb soldiers, policemen, and members of paramilitary groups after the takeover of the city in April 1992. The indictment was of major legal significance and was the first time that sexual assaults were investigated for the purpose of prosecution under the rubric of torture and enslavement as a crime against humanity. The indictment was confirmed by a 2001 verdict by the International Criminal Tribunal for the former Yugoslavia that rape and sexual enslavement are crimes against humanity. This ruling challenged the widespread acceptance of rape and sexual enslavement of women as intrinsic part of war. The International Criminal Tribunal for the former Yugoslavia found three Bosnian Serb men guilty of rape of Bosniak (Bosnian Muslim) women and girls, and two of the men were found guilty of the crime against humanity of sexual enslavement for holding women and girls captive. Many of the women subsequently disappeared. According to a report by the UN Human Rights Office, published on 28 July 2020, the women who traveled abroad were forcibly returned to North Korea and were subjected to abuse, torture, sexual violence and other violations. North Korea bans citizens from traveling abroad. Those women who were detained for doing so were regularly beaten, tortured, and subjected to forced nudity and invasive body searches. Women have also reported that in case of pregnancy, the prison officials aborted many children by either beating the women or making them do hard labor.

=== Forced marriage and slavery ===
The 1956 Supplementary Convention on the Abolition of Slavery, the Slave Trade, and Institutions and Practices Similar to Slavery defines "institutions and practices similar to slavery" to include:

c) Any institution or practice whereby:

- (i) A woman, without the right to refuse, is promised or given in marriage on payment of a consideration in money or in kind to her parents, guardian, family or any other person or group; or
- (ii) The husband of a woman, his family, or his clan, has the right to transfer her to another person for value received or otherwise; or
- (iii) A woman on the death of her husband is liable to be inherited by another person;

The Istanbul Convention requires countries which ratify it to prohibit forced marriage and to ensure that forced marriages can be easily voided without further victimization.

=== Trafficking Protocol ===
The Protocol to Prevent, Suppress and Punish Trafficking in Persons, especially Women and Children is a protocol to the Convention against Transnational Organised Crime. Its purpose is defined in Article 2. Statement of purpose as: "(a) To prevent and combat trafficking in persons, paying particular attention to women and children; (b) To protect and assist the victims of such trafficking, with full respect for their human rights; and (c) To promote cooperation among States Parties in order to meet those objectives."

== See also ==
- Abortion-rights movement
- Birth control movement in the United States
- Female education
- Feminism and equality
- Wahre und Falsche "Frauen-Emanzipation", an early essay
- Gender apartheid
- Gender Inequality Index
- Gendercide
- Girl power
- Global Women's Strike
- Gruber Prize for Women's Rights
- History of feminism
- Index of feminism articles
- International Council of Women
- Legal rights of women in history
- List of civil rights leaders
- List of feminists
- List of global issues
- List of suffragists and suffragettes
- List of women's organizations
- List of women's rights activists
- List of women's suffrage organizations
- List of women's suffrage publications
- Men's rights movement
- Misogyny
- My body, my choice
- Pregnant patients' rights
- Sex workers' rights
- Simone de Beauvoir Prize
- Timeline of reproductive rights legislation
- Timeline of women's legal rights (other than voting)
- Timeline of women's suffrage
- Women's March for the Decriminalization of Abortion
- Women's rights are human rights
- Women's rights by country
- Women's rights in 2014
- Women's Social and Political Union

== Sources ==
- Blundell, Sue (1995). Women in ancient Greece, Volume 2. Harvard University Press. p. 224. ISBN 978-0-674-95473-1.
- Pomeroy, Sarah B. (2002). Spartan Women. Oxford University Press. ISBN 978-0-19-513067-6.
- McElroy, Wendy (2008). "Feminism and Women's Rights". The Encyclopedia of Libertarianism. pp. 173–176. doi:10.4135/9781412965811.n106. ISBN 978-1-4129-6580-4. LCCN 2008009151. OCLC 750831024.
