= Married Women's Property Act =

Married Women's Property Act may refer to one of the following laws:

United Kingdom:

- Married Women's Property Act 1870 (33 & 34 Vict. c. 93)
- Married Women's Property Act 1882 (45 & 46 Vict. c. 75)
- Married Women's Property Act 1884 (47 & 48 Vict. c. 14)
- Married Women's Property Act 1893 (56 & 57 Vict. c. 63)

United States:

- Married Women's Property Acts in the United States

== See also ==
- Matrimonial Causes Act (United Kingdom)
