= Bankruptcy Act 1914 =

Act of the Parliament of the United Kingdom

Bankruptcy Act 1914 (Note: Section 169(1).)
- Act of Parliament
- Parliament of the United Kingdom
- Long title: An Act to consolidate the Law relating to Bankruptcy.
- Citation: 4 & 5 Geo. 5. c. 59
- Territorial extent: England and Wales; Isle of Man; (Note: Section 169(2).)

Dates
- Royal assent: 10 August 1914
- Commencement: 1 January 1915 (Note: Section 169(3).)
- Repealed: England and Wales: Isle of Man: 25 July 1991
Other legislation
Amended by	Administration of Estates Act 1925; Administration of Justice (Miscellaneous Provisions) Act 1933; Law Reform (Married Women and Tortfeasors) Act 1935; Companies Act 1947; Married Women (Restraint upon Anticipation) Act 1949; Statute Law Revision Act 1963; Criminal Law Act 1967; Theft Act 1968; Statute Law (Repeals) Act 1969; Courts Act 1971; Statute Law (Repeals) Act 1975; Recess Elections Act 1975; Senior Courts Act 1981; Insolvency Act 1985; Insolvency Act 1986; Drug Trafficking Offences Act 1986; Drug Trafficking Act 1994
Repealed by	England and Wales: Insolvency Act 1985, Insolvency Act 1986 and Drug Trafficking Act 1994; Isle of Man: Statute Law Revision (Isle of Man) Act 1991
Relates to	Companies Act 1948

Status: Partially repealed

Text of statute as originally enacted

The Bankruptcy Act 1914 (4 & 5 Geo. 5. c. 59) is an act of the Parliament of the United Kingdom which formed the primary source of UK insolvency law for approximately 70 years. It came into force on 1 January 1915 repealing a number of earlier enactments. It was substantially repealed by the short-lived Insolvency Act 1985.

The act is generally regarded as a consolidation of earlier enactments relating to bankruptcy.

Although the act is expressed solely with reference to the bankruptcy of individuals, section 317 of the Companies Act 1948 (11 & 12 Geo. 6. c. 38) applied many of its provisions to corporate insolvencies.

== Provisions ==
=== Repealed enactments ===
Section 168 of the act repealed 11 enactments, listed in the sixth schedule to the act.

Citation	Short title	Description	Extent of Repeal
32 & 33 Vict. c. 62.	Debtors Act 1869	The Debtors Act, 1869	Sections eleven, twelve, fourteen, fifteen, and sixteen.
45 & 46 Vict. c. 75.	Married Women's Property Act 1882	The Married Women's Property Act, 1882.	Subsection (i) of section one, and section three so far as they relate to England and Wales.
46 & 47 Vict. c. 52.	Bankruptcy Act 1883	The Bankruptcy Act, 1883.	The whole Act, except sections one, two, thirty-two, thirty-three, thirty-four, one hundred and twenty-two, one hundred and forty-five, and one hundred and forty-six, and except sections forty-two and one hundred and twenty-seven so far as they relate to cases of orders under section one hundred and twenty-two of the said Act.
47 & 48 Vict. c. 9.	Bankruptcy Appeals (County Courts) Act 1884	The Bankruptcy Appeals (County Courts) Act, 1884.	The whole act.
48 & 49 Vict. c. 47.	Bankruptcy (Office Accommodation) Act 1885	The Bankruptcy (Office Accommodation) Act, 1885.	The whole act.
49 & 50 Vict. c. 12.	Bankruptcy (Office Accommodation) Act 1886	The Bankruptcy (Office Accommodation) Act, 1886.	The whole act.
50 & 51 Vict. c. 66.	Bankruptcy (Discharge and Closure) Act 1887	The Bankruptcy (Discharge and Closure) Act, 1887.	The whole act.
51 & 52 Vict. c. 62.	Preferential Payments in Bankruptcy Act 1888	The Preferential Payments in Bankruptcy Act, 1888.	The whole act so far as unrepealed.
53 & 54 Vict. c. 71.	Bankruptcy Act 1890	The Bankruptcy Act, 1890.	The whole act, except sections nine, twelve, and twenty-five, and subsection one of section thirty-one, and except section twenty-eight so far as it relates to cases of orders under section one hundred and twenty-two of the Bankruptcy Act, 1883.
54 & 55 Vict. c. 21.	Savings Banks Act 1891	The Savings Banks Act, 1891.	Section thirteen.
3 & 4 Geo. 5. c. 34.	Bankruptcy and Deeds of Arrangement Act 1913	The Bankruptcy Act, 1913.	Part I. (except sections fifteen and twenty-seven, and except subsection (1) of section eighteen so far as it relates to cases of orders under section one hundred and twenty-two of the Bankruptcy Act, 1883), and in section forty-two the words from "and Part I. of this Act" to "the Bankruptcy Acts, 1883 to 1913," and subsection (3), Schedule I. (except so far as it relates to section twenty-five of the Bankruptcy Act, 1890) Schedule II.

=== Short title, commencement and extent ===
Section 169(1) of the act provided that the act may be cited as the Bankruptcy Act, 1914.

Section 169(2) of the act provided that the act would not extend to Scotland or Ireland unless expressly provided.

Section 169(3) of the act provided that the act would come into force on 1 January 1915.

== Subsequent developments ==
Section 130 of the act repealed by section 56 of, and part I of the second schedule to, the Administration of Estates Act 1925 (15 & 16 Geo. 5. c. 23), which came into force on 1 January 1926.

The whole act was repealed for the Isle of Man by section 1(2) of, and schedule 2 to, the Statute Law Revision (Isle of Man) Act 1991, which came into force on 25 July 1991.
