= List of acts of the Parliament of Victoria from 1882 =

This is a list of acts of the Parliament of Victoria, Australia for the year 1882.

== 1882 ==
The third session of the eleventh parliament of Victoria.

Short title, or popular name	Citation	Royal assent
Long title
Sandhurst Public Buildings Act 1882 (repealed)	46 Vict. No. 725	29 June 1882
An Act to provide for adding certain portions of Pall Mall Sandhurst to Rosalind Park, and for setting apart portion of Pall Mall as a site for a Post Office and other Public Buildings. (Repealed by Statute Law Revision Act 1984 (No. 10087))
	46 Vict. No. 726	29 June 1882
An Act to apply out of the Consolidated Revenue the sum of One million and thirty-eight thousand four hundred and fifty pounds to the service of the year One thousand eight hundred and eighty-two and three.
	46 Vict. No. 727	24 July 1882
An Act to continue and amend "The Tobacco Act 1880." (Note: Tobacco Act 1880 (44 Vict. No. 668)) (Repealed by Customs and Excise Duties Act 1890 (54 Vict. No. 1082))
Building Societies (Amending) Act 1882 (repealed)	46 Vict. No. 728	14 August 1882
An Act to amend "The Building Societies Act 1874." (Note: Building Societies Act 1874 (38 Vict. No. 493)) (Repealed by Building Societies Act 1890 (54 Vict. No. 1068))
Railways Temporary Advances Act 1882	46 Vict. No. 729	14 August 1882
An Act to apply temporarily out of the Consolidated Revenue, or out of the Railway Loan Account 1878, certain sums of money for Rolling-stock, Railway Plant, Workshops, Permanent Surveys, the connection of the Spencer-street and Flinders-street Railway Stations, a second line of way from Essendon to Seymour, and for other Railway Works.
Old Colonists' Association Act 1882	46 Vict. No. 730	14 August 1882
An Act to establish and regulate a Permanent Fund in connection with the Old Colonists' Association of Victoria.
Legislative Council Act 1881 Amending Act 1882 (repealed)	46 Vict. No. 731	8 September 1882
An Act to amend "The Legislative Council Act 1881." (Note: Legislative Council Act 1881 (45 Vict. No. 702)) (Repealed by Constitution Act Amendment Act 1890 (54 Vict. No. 1075))
	46 Vict. No. 732	8 September 1882
An Act to apply out of the Consolidated Revenue the sum of Eight hundred and twenty-five thousand pounds to the service of the year One thousand eight hundred and eighty-two and three.
	46 Vict. No. 733	26 September 1882
An Act to amend "An Act to define the Boundaries of Bailiwicks." (Note: 39 Vict. No. 518) (Repealed by Supreme Court Act 1890 (54 Vict. No. 1142))
Legislative Council Supplementary Rolls Act 1882	46 Vict. No. 734	10 October 1882
An Act to make provision for enabling Licensees under Part II. of "The Land Act 1869" (Note: Land Act 1869 (33 Vict. No. 360)) and certain joint owners joint lessees and joint assignees to vote at the periodical elections for the Legislative Council in the year One thousand eight hundred and eighty-two.
Railway Loan 1881 Application Act 1882	46 Vict. No. 735	14 November 1882
An Act to provide for the erection of State School Buildings, for completing the Houses of Parliament and Law Courts, for extending the Geelong, Coliban, and Yan Yean Waterworks, for opening the Gippsland Lakes Entrance, and for improving the Warrnambool, Belfast, and Portland Harbors.
Married Women's Property Act Amendment Act 1882 (repealed)	46 Vict. No. 736	22 November 1882
An Act to amend "The Married Women's Property Act." (Note: Married Women's Property Act 1870 (34 Vict. No. 384)) (Repealed by Married Women's Property Act 1884 (48 Vict. No. 828))
Railways Temporary Advances Act 1882 (No. 2)	46 Vict. No. 737	22 November 1882
An Act to apply temporarily out of the Consolidated Revenue or out of "The Railway Loan Account 1878" certain sums of money towards the erection of the Houses of Parliament and the Law Courts the extension of the Geelong and Coliban Waterworks the erection of State School Buildings and for other purposes.
	46 Vict. No. 738	23 November 1882
An Act to apply out of the Consolidated Revenue the sum of Six hundred and fifty-three thousand seven hundred and eighty-five pounds to the service of the year One thousand eight hundred and eighty-two and three.
Victorian Debentures Redemption Act 1882	46 Vict. No. 739	23 November 1882
An Act to authorize the Raising of Money for the Redemption or Payment of certain Debentures.
Victorian Government Inscribed Stock Act 1882	46 Vict. No. 740	23 November 1882
An Act to provide for the creation of Victorian Government Inscribed Stock and for the inscription and transfer thereof in London.
Hobson's Bay Railway and Bendigo Waterworks Debentures Redemption Act 1882	46 Vict. No. 741	23 November 1882
An Act to provide for the Redemption and Payment of certain Debentures by increasing the amount of Victorian Government Stock.
Forfeiture of Mining Shares Validating Act 1882 (repealed)	46 Vict. No. 742	6 December 1882
An Act to Validate Calls and Forfeitures of Shares in certain Registered Mining Companies. (Repealed by Companies Act 1890 (54 Vict. No. 1074))
	46 Vict. No. 743	22 December 1882
An Act to apply out of the Consolidated Revenue the sum of Six hundred and forty thousand pounds to the service of the year One thousand eight hundred and eighty-two and three.
Expiring Laws Continuance Act 1882	46 Vict. No. 744	22 December 1882
An Act to continue various Expiring Laws.

== Sources ==
- "1882 Victorian Historical Acts". AustLII.
