= Betsy Love Allen =

Chickasaw merchant and planter

- Born: Elizabeth Love; 1782; Chickasaw Nation, Mississippi
- Died: 1837 (aged 54–55); Pontotoc County, Mississippi
- Other names: Betty Love Allen, Betsy Love, Elizabeth Love, Elizabeth Love Allen
- Citizenship: Chickasaw Nation
- Occupations: Farmer, trader
- Years active: 1803–1837

Betsy Love Allen (after 1782 – July 1837) was a Chickasaw merchant and planter who ran a trading post on the Natchez Trace and maintained a large cattle plantation. Born into a wealthy and influential family, she owned property in her own right under Chickasaw law. When an attorney attempted to seize one of the people her children enslaved to pay off a debt that her husband owed, a trial ensued. The verdict—that Allen was in effect a feme sole under Chickasaw law and not subject to coverture—established the legal precedent for the State of Mississippi to pass the first Married Women's Property Act in the United States.

Although the law ostensibly gave women property rights, it did not allow them to control their property without their husbands' authority or permission. Instead, it was passed to enable men to shield their property from seizure to pay off debt. Under Chickasaw law, Allen had control over her possessions. She died before the forced removal of her people to Indian Territory in 1837 and is remembered for the lawsuit that protected her right to own property.

== Early life ==
Elizabeth Love was born after 1782, (Note: Some sources indicate she was born around 1780, likely based upon speculations made without citing any sources by Don Martini in his self-published work Who Was Who Among the Southern Indians. Others state she was born in 1790. Green places Thomas Love's arrival in the Chickasaw lands around 1782.) in the Chickasaw Nation in Mississippi. Her mother, Sally Colbert, was the oldest daughter of James Colbert, (Note: Historian James R. Atkinson noted that though the majority of modern sources show Colbert's name as James Logan Colbert, contemporary documentation does not confirm that name. Atkinson attributes the insertion of "Logan" to an article that appeared in the History of the Choctaw, Chickasaw, and Natchez Indians by H. B. Cushman in 1899. Cushman called the trader "Logan Colbert"; thereafter, James Colbert's name included "Logan" as a middle name. Atkinson further notes that the trader James Colbert, who has often been listed as Scottish, was researched by Richard A. Colbert and documented to likely have been from Plum Tree Island, in the Roanoke River, of North Carolina.) a North Carolinian trader who had settled in the Chickasaw lands in Alabama as a child in 1729, and his first Chickasaw wife. Colbert became a wealthy plantation owner who enslaved around one hundred and fifty people and founded a prominent Chickasaw family of mixed-race children. The Colbert-Love marriage created a union of two families, which became influential in Chickasaw politics and the tribe's relationship with the United States government throughout the early nineteenth century. The families were part of the planter class and enslaved numerous people, as well as virtually controlling the commerce of the Chickasaw Nation with traders from the Southern Colonies.

Betsy's father, Thomas Love, a Loyalist, fled to the Chickasaw Nation around 1782 after the British defeat in the Gulf Coast campaign during the American Revolutionary War. He fathered thirteen children with two wives, Sally, and his second wife, Homahota or Emahota, who was also known as French Nancy, was of mixed Chickasaw-French heritage, and near the age of his older children. (Note: Green notes the information on Thomas Love's marriages came from Marie Garland's book, The Chickasaw Loves and Allied Families.) With his first wife, who was of the clan In-cun-no-mar, Thomas had seven sons – Henry, Isaac, Sloan, Benjamin, Samuel, Robert, and William – and three daughters, Delilah, Elizabeth, and Nancy. The sons were educated at the Choctaw Academy in Kentucky, but all of the Love children were educated and spoke both Chickasaw and English. (Note: Thomas Love built a schoolhouse in 1813 in the Chickasaw Nation, which taught children English, arithmetic, bookkeeping, geography, reading, and writing. Before that time, Native students were often boarded outside of the nation.) By 1820, the majority of the Love family lived about six miles southwest of present-day Holly Springs, in a farming community. In 1826, a Presbyterian mission was established known as the Martyn Mission near Pigeon Roost Creek, and many of the family members joined this church.

Before her marriage, Love had obtained a plantation from the communal lands of the tribe, as well as enslaved people, farm equipment, and livestock. By 1803, (Note: Numerous sources speculate that Love married in 1797 or 1798. Armstrong analyzed a letter written on September 2, 1797, from Captain Isaac Guion to General James Wilkinson, which stated that James B. Allen, was married to Susie, the sister of William Colbert, oldest son of James Colbert. Further, in the appeal for Fisher v. Allen, Fisher claimed that the jurisdiction of the Mississippi Territory began in 1799. Natives and whites married from that date were, therefore, subject to the laws of the territorial government. Armstrong also stated that Love and Allen's oldest son was born in 1805, with possibly one daughter earlier, and their youngest daughter was born in 1833. Green notes that visitors described meeting Betsy at the couple's home in 1803. Gilmer also places the marriage as likely to have occurred around 1805.) she had married James B. Allen, (Note: Benson noted that the transcripts of the trial for Fisher v. Allen give both John and James as the name of Betsy's husband. She also states that students from Toccopola High School erected a tombstone for Betsy in 1933, which erroneously gave her husband as "Colonel John L. Allen". Both Benson and Armstrong analyzed the discrepancy and noted that John L. Allen was appointed by President Andrew Jackson as the Chickasaw agent in 1829 and that his wife was Margaret. Benson points out that Betsy's husband appeared to be dead when Fisher v. Allen was being heard. Green states that Martini's Who Was Who (1998) gives James' death as occurring around 1835, while 20th-century newspapers reported the death as having occurred in 1834. Armstrong states that the Margaret who married John Allen was the daughter of William Colbert (Betsy's uncle) and that per census records between 1836 and 1850, and court documents filed in 1842, Margaret and John were living in Lowndes County, Mississippi. Further adding to the family confusion, per Armstrong, was that James Allen and Susie Colbert also had a daughter named Margaret, known as Peggy.) who had previously been married to and divorced from her maternal aunt, Susie Colbert. (Note: Armstrong notes that Susie Perry (née Colbert, formerly Allen) gave enslaved people by a gift deed to her daughter Margaret (née Allen) Burney in 1825, which confirmed she divorced Allen and remarried.) The couple were not married under the laws of the Mississippi Territory, but rather by Native custom. James Allen was a North Carolinian who had been a lawyer in Nashville, Tennessee, before moving to the Chickasaw Nation before 1793, where he became an interpreter at the Chickasaw Agency. Under Chickasaw matrilineal custom, Love would not have taken Allen's name, nor would any of her property have become her husband's upon marriage. The Allen family appeared on the 1818 Chickasaw Annuity Roll and besides James and Elizabeth, included children George, Sarah (aka Sally), Louisiana (aka Lucy), Mississippi, Alexander, and Susannah (aka Susan). In 1829, Love deeded several of the people she enslaved to her children, which, at that time, also included Tennessee, Mary (aka Polly), Elizabeth, and Samuel. Her last child, Mourning, was born in 1833 and applied for a Chickasaw allotment in Indian Territory but died in 1899 before the finalization of the Dawes Rolls.

Love and Allen lived in what would become Monroe County, Mississippi on communal lands occupied by the extended Love family. At one point, they operated and ran a trading post on the Natchez Trace, and also maintained a large cattle ranch near Toccopola, Mississippi. Under the terms of the allotment treaties, each Chickasaw citizen received an individual allotment of 640 acres (260 hectares) of land and 320 acres (130 hectares) for one to ten enslaved people. Families with five or fewer members were allotted 1,280 acres (520 hectares) of land, families with between six and ten members were granted 1,920 acres (780 hectares), and families with more than ten members received 2,680 acres (1,080 hectares). In 1836, Love sold some of her Chickasaw allotments at auction for US$6,400 (equivalent to $158,000 in 2021), an amount that was exceeded by only five others out of the four hundred Natives who sold land that year.

== Property dispute ==
=== Background ===
In 1829, the State of Mississippi extended its sovereignty over the Choctaw and Chickasaw people living within the state. The following year, the United States Congress passed the Indian Removal Act, which authorized negotiations with Native tribes to relinquish their lands east of the Mississippi River in exchange for lands west of the river. In 1830, Mississippi passed a Citizenship Act, which conferred citizenship on the indigenous population while recognizing their previous marital unions and property rights. Establishing Native property rights was necessary, as legislation could then be drafted to allot communally held lands to individuals, who would then be able to sell their lands and remove to the Western United States. Accordingly, Chickasaw lands began to be distributed to individuals, and the traditional tribal holdings were eliminated. Under two treaties, the Treaty of Pontotoc Creek ratified in 1833 and the Treaty of Washington signed in 1834, terms under which lands would be allotted were agreed.

Richard Green, a historian who focuses on Chickasaw history, noted that by the time the appeal was being heard in 1837, the judges were aware of the removal treaties and that Native women were to receive allotments. Their allotments would not require a husband's permission to be sold, meaning a Chickasaw wife could freely sell her land to any of the white land speculators who had come to Mississippi to buy up property and facilitate the removal of Native people. Academic Megan Benson pointed out that it was also crucial to enslavers that as new states were admitted in the west, slavery was expanded into these territories. She recognized the fairly consistent precedent in Mississippi law to exempt slave property from seizure for debt payment. Her analysis, as well as that of scholar Joseph Custer, included that the justices deciding the case would also have been influenced by the perceived threat of civil unrest by enslaved people or free blacks and a desire to control their populations by allowing them to be transported out of the state.

=== Fisher v. Allen (1829–1830) ===
In 1784, Alexander Malcom (or Malcolm) paid James Allen five thousand pounds in North Carolina currency to purchase a tract of land in Tennessee. Allen did not transfer the property, and in 1829, when Mississippi passed legislation to extend state law over the Chickasaw people, Malcom sued Allen. James hired John Fisher to represent him in the case Alexander Malcom v. James Allen and draft a deed gift of enslaved people from his wife to her children. Allen promised to pay Fisher $200 for representing him in the case, but he defaulted on that debt. To recover his fees, Fisher sued Allen and won a judgment against him in 1830. Fisher then had the county sheriff seize an enslaved person named Toney to sell at a public auction. Fisher and the sheriff believed that Toney was Allen's property because, under the rules of coverture, any property owned by a woman automatically became a husband's property when they married. Toney was one of the twenty-five enslaved people Love had given to her children in 1829 and was the property of Love's daughter Susan.

=== Appeal (1831–1837) ===
An interpleader action against Fisher was filed to protest Toney's seizure in the Circuit Court of Monroe County, Mississippi, in 1831. Susan was a minor, and the bond ($650) for her protest against the sale of Toney was posted by her brother George (who also represented her) and her great-uncle James Colbert. Another relative, Benjamin Love, testified on Chickasaw law. The court decided in favor of Susan, but Fisher appealed. Allen claimed that until 1830, Mississippi law had not been extended to the Chickasaw people, and there was no obligation for Native persons to follow the territorial or state laws. When it became applicable, the 1830 Citizenship Act validated all marriages and matrimonial unions that had previously occurred under Chickasaw custom and grandfathered Native marital property laws. Fisher disputed this, claiming that the jurisdiction of the Mississippi Territory began in 1799 and all inhabitants were subject to the laws of the territorial government from that date. Justice Smith disagreed, noting in his opinion that even after statehood in 1817, the laws of Mississippi had not been extended to all of the inhabitants. He concluded that until January 1830, when new legislation extended citizenship to Native people within the state and abolished their tribal government, neither the laws nor the state constitution fully applied to the Chickasaw or Choctaw people.

Having determined that Mississippi law was inapplicable, Smith then examined tribal custom and acknowledged that a marriage contract by Chickasaw custom conferred no rights for a husband to his wife's separate property. This meant that each person in a marriage held title to their property—whether real or personal property—and debts were individually owed. Because of this practice, a wife's property could not be seized to settle a husband's debt. Evaluating the status of Toney, Smith confirmed that Betsy Love had deeded him to Susan by a gift deed signed on November 14, 1829, which was recorded in the Monroe County Clerk's office on November 2, 1830. Fisher did not deny that Toney had been gifted by Love but argued that because the instrument had not been recorded within ninety days of the 1830 legislation that the deed was not binding and invalid. Chief Justice William L. Sharkey rejected Fisher's argument because no claim had ever been made against Betsy Love. He continued that "even if the debts had existed at the time of making the gift, but it does not appear that any such debts existed at that time", a creditor of James Allen would not have been able to claim Love's property.

The final ruling of the Mississippi High Court of Errors and Appeals, written in two separate opinions issued by Justices Sharkey and Smith in January 1837, concluded that Chickasaw women were in effect feme soles and not subject to the restrictions of coverture under common law. They found that a Native wife's ability to acquire or dispose of her property or debts applied to those owned before marriage, as well as extending during the continuance of the marriage. In other words, no community property interests were created by marriage; thus, a wife's property could not be used to satisfy a husband's debts. Fisher lost his case, Allen's debt remained unpaid, and Toney remained enslaved as Susan's property.

=== Aftermath (1837–1839) ===
The year the case was reviewed, a major financial crisis occurred in the United States. According to historian Robert Gilmer, legislators hurt by the 1837 economic depression saw a way to "protect their own interests by using part of the Chickasaw tribal law found in the Fisher v. Allen case and extending its applicability to all married women in Mississippi" through legislation. Benson concurred that neither Fisher v. Allen nor the Married Women's Property Act passed in 1839 had to do with women's rights or protecting women. She argues that equity trusts, which applied to either Native or white women, were previously used successfully to protect women's property. (Note: Specifically, Benson pointed out that Betsy's cousin, Margaret Allen, who married Chickasaw agent John Allen, used an equity trust to protect her allotment. When John made terrible investments that impacted her property, she sued him and had him removed as her trustee. But she also noted that Piety Smith's assets had not been adequately protected by an equity trust, which led her husband, Thomas B. J. Hadley, to secure first a private Act to exempt himself from a debt to Mississippi and to introduce the Married Women's Property Act in 1839. The motivations of Hadley to introduce the bill are confirmed by scholars and authors LeAnne Howe and Diane Klein.) She states that Fisher v. Allen specifically was decided to facilitate removal and that the Women's Property Act was passed to shield men's assets from credit seizures. Gilmer concurred that extending women's rights was "unintentional", and that by removing the protections of coverture for Chickasaw women, which had been inserted in the 1834 Treaty of Washington, Native women became victims of unscrupulous land speculators. He also noted that attempts to modify the bill to prevent husbands from hiding or shielding their assets in their wives' names, as proposed by Senator Spence Grayson, were voted down. Of the five sections in the Act, four dealt specifically with enslaved people. The first provision allowed a wife to hold as separate property any real or personal property that was free from coverture and acquired other than by gift from her spouse. The remaining provisions allowed a wife to enslave people and the descendants of enslaved people she owned freely before her marriage or those acquired by inheritance or gift after the marriage, separately from her husband, as long as the husband controlled and managed their labor and production, he represented the wife in any suit regarding her property, and a joint deed conveyed any sale from the husband and wife.

== Death and legacy ==
Love died in July 1837, and her will was probated in Pontotoc County, Mississippi, after it was filed on August 29, 1837. At the time of her death, she owned over three hundred acres of land in Mississippi and Tennessee (some of it in allotments); cattle, horses, and other livestock; farm equipment; home furnishings; and twelve enslaved people totaling some US$10,000 (equivalent to $240,000 in 2021). Her heirs were determined to be George C. (or G.) Allen, Sally (wife of Martin Colbert), Lucy (wife of Joshua Murray), Mississippi (wife of Charles Colbert), Alexander Allen, Susan (wife of John Guest), Tennessee (wife of John Richard Overton), Joseph H. Gordon (widower of Mary "Polly" Allen), and Mourning Allen (a minor). Kerri M. Armstrong, a Chickasaw historian, stated that it is probable because they are not named, that the other children were deceased by the time the estate was distributed, which occurred around 1849. Love and her property, which were at the center of the Fisher v. Allen case, and Chickasaw traditional inheritance and property customs, are widely credited as creating the common law precedent to pass the first married women's property legislation in the United States. (Note: In 1944, Elizabeth Gasper Brown wrote an article on the Mississippi Women's Property Act claiming that Piety Smith Hadley pressed for passage of the Act as a feminist action. Howe notes that there is no record "that Mrs. Hadley pushed for women's property rights in Mississippi" — no petitions, nor newspaper articles or advertisements calling for women's equality at the time of the passage of the law support Brown's admitted "hypothesis". Gilmer also noted that if indeed Smith Hadley coerced voters to pass the legislation, it was not a feminist action, as it extended no actual rights to women since they could not manage, sell, or defend their property in court, unlike the Chickasaw law which allowed women to retain control of their property.)

Almost all of Love's surviving children eventually emigrated to Indian Territory. Around 1835, Mississippi and her husband Calvin Colbert, who died in 1842, arrived. After his death, she married Jackson Juzan, and she died in 1865. Tennessee and Richard Overton arrived in January 1839, but he quickly abandoned his family. (Note: She was still Tennessee Overton when in 1848, she was granted a patent on 1,281 acres (518 hectares) of land granted under the 1834 Treaty in Benton County, Mississippi and Fayette County, Tennessee.) Susan and John Guest arrived at Fort Towson with thirty-eight family members in January 1840. On June 28 of that year, her husband was murdered by his father in a dispute over enslaved people. Susan later remarried with David Wall. Sarah Colbert, a widow, and formerly one of the plural wives (including her sister Louisiana) of Martin Colbert arrived at Fort Coffee on January 10, 1842, en route to the Chickasaw lands with her household which included a nephew William F. Stuart. Sarah died in 1854, on her property near Colbert, Oklahoma. George immigrated with his family of five and his sister Mourning Allen in April 1847 and settled near the mouth of the Washita River.

Love's grandson, Benjamin Franklin Overton, served as the governor of the Chickasaw Nation from 1874 to 1876, when he was elected to a second term, serving to 1878. He was re-elected in 1880 and 1882, serving until he died in 1884. In 1933, students from the high school in Toccopola unearthed Love's remains from the Chickasaw burying ground and re-interred them under a gravestone on their school grounds bearing the inscription "Noted for Her Role in the Establishment of Property Rights of Married Women in the Anglo-Saxon World". The Mississippi Historical Commission erected a historical marker to "Betty Allen" in 1951, and the Mother's Study Club erected a new stone on the high school grounds in 1954, also styled as "Betty Allen". The Toccopola Homemaker Volunteers established a Betty Allen Festival in 2003, and an artist in Booneville created a statue in Love's honor to mark the event. The statue was stolen in 2004. In 2018, the Chickasaw Historical Society erected a monument in Toccopola to celebrate Love's memory for Women's History Month.
