= Women's rights by country =

This article provides an index of women's rights by country in various domains.

== Women's emancipation ==
Women's right in:	Forced marriage prohibited? (see: Forced marriage)	Unmarried women emancipated?	Married women emancipated?	Men and women equalized in marriage?	Notes and sources
Afghanistan	No	No	No	No	
Albania	Since 1928	Yes	Yes	Yes	
Algeria	Since 1984	Yes (since 2005)	Yes (since 2005)	Yes	
Angola	Yes	Yes	Since 1996	Since 1996	
Argentina	Yes	Since 1870	Since 1926/1968	Since 1987	
Armenia	Yes	Yes	Yes	Yes	
Australia	Yes	Yes	Yes	Yes	
Austria	Yes	Yes	Since 1975/6	Since 1978	
Azerbaijan	Yes	Yes	Yes	Yes	
Bahrain	Yes	No: getting married	No: leaving their home Yes: Getting passport, leaving the country	No	
Bangladesh	Yes	Yes	Yes	No	
Belarus	Yes	Yes	Yes	Yes	
Benin	Since 2004	Yes	Since 2002	Since 2005	
Bhutan	Yes	Yes	Yes	Yes	
Bolivia	Yes	Yes	Since 1972	Yes	
Bosnia and Herzegovina	Yes	Yes	Yes	Yes	
Botswana	Yes	Yes	Since 2005	SInce 2005	
Brazil	Yes	Yes	Since 1962	Since 1988	
Brunei	Yes	No	No	No	
Bulgaria	Yes	Yes	Yes	Since 1945	
Burkina Faso	Since 1990	Yes	Since 1990	Since 1990	
Burundi	Yes	Yes	Since 1993	No	
Cambodia	Yes	Yes	Yes	Yes	
Cameroon	Since 2007	Yes	No: getting a job	No	
Canada	Yes	Yes	Yes	Yes	
Central African Republic	Yes	Yes	Yes	No	
Chad	Yes	Yes	No: getting a job	No	
Chile	Yes	Yes	Since 1979	No	Article 1749 of the Chile Civil Code stripulates man is the head of the household
China	Since 1950	Yes	Yes	Since 1950	New Marriage Law
Colombia	Yes	Yes	Since 1932	Yes	
Costa Rica	Yes	Yes	Yes	Yes	
Democratic Republic of the Congo	Since 2006	Yes	Since 2017	No	
Republic of the Congo	Yes	Yes	Yes	No	
Croatia	Yes	Yes	Yes	Yes	
Cuba	Yes	Yes	Since 1917	Yes	
Cyprus	Yes	Yes	Yes	Yes	
Czech Republic	Yes	Yes	Yes	Yes	
Denmark	Yes	Since 1857	Since 1899	Since 1925	
Cyprus	Yes	Yes	Yes	Yes	
Djibouti	Yes	Yes	No	No	
Dominican Republic	Yes	Yes	Since 1978	Yes	
Ecuador	Yes	Yes	Since 1949	Yes	
Egypt	No	No	No: Leaving their home, getting a job Yes: Getting passport and travelling abroad (since 2000)	No	
El Salvador	Yes	Yes	Since 1902	Since 1994	
Eritrea	Yes	Yes	Since 1992	Since 1992	
Estonia	Yes	Yes	Yes	Yes	
Eswatini	Yes	Yes	No: working a job	No	
Ethiopia	Since 2004	Yes	Since 2000	Since 2000	
Finland	Yes	Since 1864	Yes	Since 1929	
France	Since 1804	Since 1893	Yes: Legal majority: Since 1938, right to work without husband permission: 1965	Since 1970	
Gabon		Yes	Since 2021	Since 2021	
Gambia	Since 2016				
Georgia	Yes	Yes	Yes	Yes	
Germany	Yes	Yes	1977: Right to work without husband's permission	Since 1979	
Ghana	Since 1999	Yes	Yes	Since 1999	
Greece	Yes	Yes	Since 1983	Since 1983	
Guatemala	Yes	Yes	Since 1963	Yes	
Guinea	Yes	Yes	Since 2019	Since 2019	
Guinea-Bissau	Yes	Yes	No: getting a job	No	
Guyana	Yes	Yes	Yes	Yes	
Haiti	Yes	Yes	Yes	Since 1983	
Honduras	Yes	Yes	Since 1906	Yes	
Hungary	Yes	Yes	Yes	Yes	
Iceland	Yes	Since 1861	Since 1899	Since 1923	
India	Yes	Yes	Yes	Yes	
Indonesia	Yes	Yes	Since 1963	No	
Iran	Yes	Yes	No: Leaving home, getting passport requires husband permission	No	
Iraq	Since 1959	Since 1959	No: leaving their home Yes: Getting passport (since 2014)	No	
Ireland	Yes	Yes	Yes	Yes	
Israel	Yes	Yes	Yes	Yes	
Italy	Yes	Since 1865	Since 1975	Since 1975	
Ivory Coast	Since 1965	Yes	Since 2013	Yes	
Japan	Since 1889	Yes	Yes	Since 1947	
Jordan	Yes	No: getting married	No: leaving their home, getting a job Yes: getting a passport (since 2013)	No	
Kazakhstan	Yes	Yes	Yes	Yes	
Kenya	Since 2001	Yes	Yes	Yes	
Kuwait	Yes	No: getting married	No: leaving their home Yes: getting passport (since 2009)	No	
Kyrgyzstan	Yes	Yes	Yes	Yes	
Laos	Yes	Yes	Yes	Yes	
Latvia	Yes	Yes	Yes	Yes	
Lebanon	Yes		No: leaving their home Yes: getting a passport, leaving the country (since 1974)	No	
Lesotho	Yes	Yes	Since 2006	Since 2006	
Liberia	Yes	Yes	Since 1973	Since 1973	
Libya	Yes	No	No	No	
Lithuania	Yes	Yes	Yes	Yes	
Luxembourg	Yes	Yes	Since 1972	Yes	
Madagascar	Yes	Yes	Since 2008	No	
Malawi	Since 2010	Yes	Yes	Yes	
Malaysia	Yes	No: getting married	No	No	
Mali	Since 1962	No	No	No	
Malta	Yes	Yes	Yes	Since 1994	
Mauritania	No	No: getting married	No: getting a job	No	Consent required for marriage of adult women, but "silence equates consent" for underage girls
Mexico	Yes	Yes	Since 1917	Since 1928	
Moldova	Yes	Yes	Yes	Yes	
Mongolia	Yes	Yes	Yes	Yes	
Montenegro	Yes	Since 1888	Yes	Yes	
Morocco	Since 2004	Since 2004	Since 2004	No	
Mozambique	Yes	Yes	Since 2004	Since 2004	
Myanmar	Yes	Yes	Yes	Yes	
Namibia	Yes	Yes	Since 1996	Yes	
Nepal	Since 1963	Since 2002	Since 2007	Since 2007	
Netherlands	Yes	Since 1795	Since 1956	Since 1984	
New Zealand	Yes	Yes	Since 1903	Since 1926	
Nicaragua	Yes	Yes	Since 1904	Yes	
Niger	Yes	Yes	No: getting a job	No	
Nigeria (Southern states)	Yes	Yes	Yes	Yes	
Nigeria (Sharia states)	No	No	No	No	
North Korea	Since 1947	Yes	Yes	Yes	
North Macedonia	Yes	Yes	Yes	Yes	
Norway	Yes	Since 1863	Since 1890	Since 1927	
Oman	Yes	No	No (leaving their home); Yes: Getting a passport (since 2010)	No	
Pakistan	Since 2007	Yes	Yes	No	
Panama	Yes	Yes	Yes	Yes	
Papua New Guinea	Yes	Yes	Since 1987/92	Yes	
Paraguay	Yes	Yes	Since 1987	Yes	
Peru	Yes	Yes	Since 1984	Since 1984	
Philippines	Yes	Yes	Yes	Yes	
Poland	Yes	Yes	Yes	Yes	
Portugal	Yes	Since 1867	Since 1969	Since 1978	
Qatar	Yes	No: leaving the country, getting married	No: leaving their home Yes: getting a passport (since 2007)	No	
Romania	Yes	Yes	Since 1932	Yes	
Russia	Since 1724	Yes	Yes	Since 1918	
Rwanda	Yes	Yes	Since 1988	Since 1988	
Saudi Arabia	Since 2005	No: marriage Yes: getting a passport (since 2019)	No: Must obey husband Yes: getting a passport (since 2019)	No	
Senegal	Yes	Yes	Yes	No	
Serbia	Yes	Yes	Yes	Yes	
Sierra Leone	Since 2007				
Singapore	Yes	Yes	Yes	Yes	
Slovakia	Yes	Yes	Yes	Yes	
Slovenia	Yes	Yes	Yes	Yes	
Somalia	No	No	No	No	
Somaliland	No	No	No	No	
South Africa	Yes	Yes	Yes	Since 2000	
South Korea	Yes	Yes	Yes	Since 2005	
South Sudan	No	No	No	No	
Spain	Yes	Since 1978	Since 1981	Since 1981	
Sudan	No	No	No	No	
Suriname	Yes	Yes	Since 1981	Since 1981	
Sweden	Since 1734	Since 1863 – 1882	Since 1920	Since 1920	
Switzerland	Yes	Since 1884	Since 1984	Since 1988	
Syria	Yes	Partially: Marriage	No	No	
Taiwan	Yes	Yes	Since 1998	Since 2000	
Tajikistan	Yes	Yes	Yes	Yes	
Thailand	Since 1868				
Timor-Leste	Yes	Yes	Since 2012	Since 2012	
Tonga	Since 1956	No: Land ownership	No: Land ownership		
Togo	Since 2007	Yes	Since 2014	Yes	
Tunisia	Since 1956	Yes	Yes, can work (since 2000), leave home (since 1993) and get passport without husband permission	No	
Turkey	Since 1917	Yes	Yes	Since 2001	
Uganda	Yes (civil marriage); No (Muslims)	Yes (civil marriage); No (Muslims)	Yes (civil marriage); No (Muslims)	No	
Ukraine	Yes	Yes	Yes	Yes	
United Arab Emirates	Yes	No: getting married Yes: getting passport	No: leaving their home Yes: getting passport (since 2017)	No	
United Kingdom	Yes	Yes	Yes	Since 1949	
United States	Yes	Yes	Yes	Yes	
Uruguay	Yes	Yes	Since 1946	Yes	
Uzbekistan	Since 1926				
Venezuela	Yes	Yes	Since 1942	Yes	
Vietnam	Since 1960	Yes	Yes	Yes	
Yemen	No	No	No	No	Consent required for marriage of previously married women, but "silence equates consent" for never-married women
Zambia	Since 2011	Yes	Yes	Yes	
Zimbabwe	Yes	Yes	Since 1982	Since 2022	

=== Canada ===
Women's right in:	Married women emancipated?	Men and women equalized in marriage?	Notes and sources
Alberta	1922	1920: equal guardianship rights	
British Columbia	1873	1917	
Manitoba	1900	1922	
New Brunswick	1895	?	
Newfoundland and Labrador	1876	?	
Nova Scotia	1884	1941	
Ontario	1884	1927	
Prince Edward Island	1903	?	
Quebec	1964	1981	
Saskatchewan	1907	1926	

=== Australia ===
Women's right in:	Married women emancipated?	Men and women equalized in marriage?	Notes and sources
New South Wales	1879	?	
Queensland	1890	?	
South Australia	1884	?	
Tasmania	1883	?	
Victoria	1884	?	
Western Australia	1892	?	

=== United States ===
Women's right in:	Married women emancipated?			Men and women equalized in marriage?	Notes and sources
Women's right in:	Separate earnings	Separate property	Work without husband permission	Men and women equalized in marriage?	Notes and sources
Alabama	1877	1867	?	1981	
Alaska	?	?	?	?	
Arizona	1873	1871	1871	?	
Arkansas	1873	1871	1868	?	
California	1872	1872	1872	?	
Colorado	1861/1874	1861/1874	1874	?	
Connecticut	1877	1877	1877	?	
Delaware	1873	1873/5	?	?	
Florida	1892	1943	?	?	
Georgia	1861	1873	?	1983	
Hawaii	?	?	?	?	
Idaho	1915/1887	1903	1887	?	
Illinois	1861/9	1861	1874	?	
Indiana	1879	1879	?	?	
Iowa	1870/3	1873	1873	?	
Kansas	1858/68	1858/68	1868	?	
Kentucky	1873	1894	1873	?	
Louisiana	1928	1916	1894	1980	
Maine	1857	1844/55	1844	?	
Maryland	1842/60	1860	1860	?	
Massachusetts	1846/74	1855/72	1874	?	
Michigan	1911	1855	?	?	
Minnesota	1869	1869	1874	?	
Mississippi	1871/3	1871/80	1871	?	
Missouri	1875/9	1875/9	?	?	
Montana	1874/87	1872/87	1874	?	
Nebraska	1871/81	1871/81	1881	?	
Nevada	1873	1873	1873	?	
New Hampshire	1867	1860/7	1876	?	
New Jersey	1874	1852	1874	?	
New Mexico	?	1884	?	?	
New York	1860	1848	1860	?	
North Carolina	1873/1913	1868	1874	?	
North Dakota	1877	1877	1877	?	
Ohio	1861	1861	?	?	
Oklahoma	?	1883	?	1984	
Oregon	1872/80	1878	1880	?	
Pennsylvania	1872	1848	?	?	
Rhode Island	1872/4	1872/48	?	?	
South Carolina	1887	1868/70	1970	?	
South Dakota	1877	1877	1877		
Tennessee	1919	1870/1919	?	?	
Texas	1913/68	1913/68	?	1968	
Utah	1895/7	1872/95	1895	?	
Vermont	1888	1881	1881	?	
Virginia	1888	1877/8	?	?	
Washington	1881/9	1881/9	1889	?	
West Virginia	1893	1868	1893	?	
Wisconsin	1872	1850	?	1921	
Wyoming	1869/76	1869/76	1876	?	

== Women's voting rights ==
Women's right to vote by country or territory

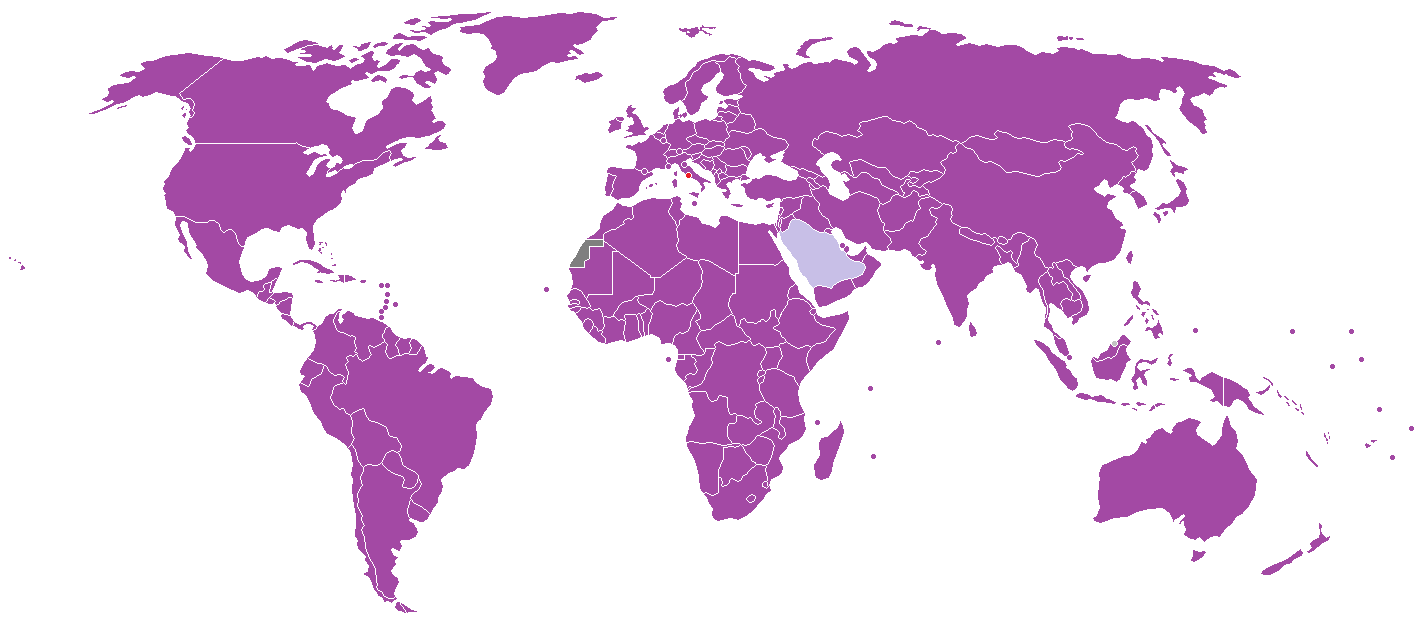
Prohibition Authorized but with limitations Locally authorized (no national elections) Completely authorized

== Women's reproductive rights ==
Emergency contraceptive availability by country or territory

Allows direct access to EC over the counter Allows access to EC from a pharmacist without requiring a prescription Requires a prescription to access EC EC not available

Laws regarding sterilization for contraceptive purposes around the world

Legal from the age of 18 Legal from the age of 21, 25 or 18 for those with two children Legal from the age of 25 Legal from the age of 30, 35 or 40 Legal for those with at least 3, 4 or 5 children sometimes with additional age requirements Illegal No data

== Women's body integrity rights ==
Female genital mutilation laws by country

Specific criminal provision or national law prohibiting FGM General criminal provision that might be used to prosecute FGM Partial or subnational FGM criminalisation, or unclear legal status FGM not criminalised No data

== See also ==
- Timeline of women's legal rights (other than voting)
