= Married Women's Property Act 1893 =

Act of the Parliament of the United Kingdom

Married Women's Property Act 1893 (Note: Section 5.)
- Act of Parliament
- Parliament of the United Kingdom
- Long title: An Act to amend the Married Women's Property Act, 1882.
- Citation: 56 & 57 Vict. c. 63
- Territorial extent: England and Wales; Scotland; (Note: Section 6.)

Dates
- Royal assent: 5 December 1893
- Commencement: 5 December 1893 (Note: The Acts of Parliament (Commencement) Act 1793.)
- Repealed: Northern Ireland: 13 April 1976
Other legislation
Amends	Wills Act 1837; Married Women's Property Act 1882
Amended by	Statute Law Revision Act 1908; Law Reform (Married Women and Tortfeasors) Act 1935; Married Women (Restraint upon Anticipation) Act 1949
Repealed by	Northern Ireland: Statute Law Revision (Northern Ireland) Act 1976

Status: Partially repealed

Text of statute as originally enacted

Revised text of statute as amended

Text of the Married Women's Property Act 1893 as in force today (including any amendments) within the United Kingdom, from legislation.gov.uk.

The Married Women's Property Act 1893 (56 & 57 Vict. c. 63) is an act of the Parliament of the United Kingdom that significantly altered English law regarding the property rights granted to married women. It completed the Married Women's Property Act 1882 (45 & 46 Vict. c. 75) by granting married women the same property rights equal to unmarried women.

== See also ==
- Feme covert
- Married Women's Property Act 1884
- Primogeniture
