= Law Reform (Husband and Wife) Act 1962 =

Act of the Parliament of the United Kingdom

Law Reform (Husband and Wife) Act 1962 (Note: Section 3(1).)
- Act of Parliament
- Parliament of the United Kingdom
- Long title: An Act to amend the law with respect to civil proceedings between husband and wife
- Citation: 10 & 11 Eliz. 2. c. 48
- Territorial extent: England and Wales; Scotland; (Note: Section 3(5).)

Dates
- Royal assent: 1 August 1962
- Commencement: 1 August 1962 (Note: The Acts of Parliament (Commencement) Act 1793.)
- Repealed: Scotland: 4 May 2006 (Note: The Family Law (Scotland) Act 2006 (Commencement, Transitional Provisions and Savings) Order 2006 (SI 2006/212).)
Other legislation
Amends	See § Repealed enactments
Amended by	Statute Law (Repeals) Act 1974; County Courts Act 1984; Civil Procedure (Modification of Enactments) Order 1998
Repealed by	Scotland: Family Law (Scotland) Act 2006

Status: Partially repealed

Text of statute as originally enacted

Revised text of statute as amended

Text of the Law Reform (Husband and Wife) Act 1962 as in force today (including any amendments) within the United Kingdom, from legislation.gov.uk.

The Law Reform (Husband and Wife) Act 1962 (10 & 11 Eliz. 2. c. 48) is an act of the Parliament of the United Kingdom that allows husbands and wives to sue each other under tort law. Originally covering both England and Wales and Scotland, the Scottish provisions were repealed by the Family Law (Scotland) Act 2006.

== Provisions ==
Under the common law and Section 12 of the Married Women's Property Act 1882 (45 & 46 Vict. c. 75), a husband and wife were incapable of committing tortious acts against each other, and could not sue each other under tort law. The Law Reform Committee, in its Ninth Report, recommended the abolition of this set of circumstances, and their recommendation was made into the Law Reform (Husband and Wife) Bill, which was given royal assent on 1 August 1962.

The act provides that married couples can sue each other under tort, with two exceptions; first, where the court believes there would be no great benefit from a legal action (in which case it can stay the proceedings) and second, when the dispute is to do with property.

=== Repealed enactments ===
Section 3(2) of the act repealed 2 enactments, listed in the schedule to the act.

Citation	Short title	Extent of repeal
45 & 46 Vict. c. 75	Married Women's Property Act 1882	Section twelve, except so far as it relates to criminal proceedings.
45 & 46 Vict. c. 75	Married Women's Property Act 1882	Section twenty-three.
25 & 26 Geo. 5. c. 30	Law Reform (Married Women and Tortfeasors) Act 1935	In section one, the words "and subject, as respects actions in tort between husband and wife, to the provisions of section twelve of the Married Women's Property Act, 1882".

== Subsequent developments ==
Section 3(2) of, and the schedule to, the act were repealed by section 1 of, and part XI of the schedule to, the Statute Law (Repeals) Act 1974, which came into force on 27 June 1974.

== Bibliography ==
- K-F, O. (1962). "Law Reform (Husband and Wife) Act, 1962". Modern Law Review. 25 (6). Blackwell Publishing. ISSN 0026-7961.
