= Coverture =

Wife's legal status subsumed into husband's

Coverture was a legal doctrine in English common law under which a married woman's legal existence was considered to be merged with that of her husband. Upon marriage, she had no independent legal existence of her own, in keeping with society's expectation that her husband was to provide for and protect her. Under coverture a woman became a feme covert, whose legal rights and obligations were mostly subsumed by those of her husband. An unmarried woman, or feme sole, retained the right to own property and make contracts in her own name.

Coverture became well-established in the common law for several centuries and was inherited by common-law jurisdictions.

After the rise of the women's rights movement in the mid-19th century, coverture came under increasing criticism as oppressive and as hindering women from exercising ordinary property rights or entering professions. Coverture was first substantially modified by late-19th-century Married Women's Property Acts passed in various common-law jurisdictions, and was weakened and eventually eliminated by later reforms. Certain aspects of coverture (mainly concerned with preventing a wife from unilaterally incurring major financial obligations for which her husband would be liable) survived as late as the 1960s in some states of the United States.

== Principle ==
Under traditional English common law, an adult unmarried woman was considered to have the legal status of feme sole, while a married woman had the status of feme covert. These terms are English spellings of medieval Anglo-Norman phrases (the modern standard French spellings would be femme seule "single woman" and femme couverte, literally "covered woman").

The principle of coverture was described in William Blackstone's Commentaries on the Laws of England in the late 18th century:

By marriage, the husband and wife are one person in law: that is, the very being or legal existence of the woman is suspended during the marriage, or at least is incorporated and consolidated into that of the husband: under whose wing, protection, and cover, she performs every thing; and is therefore called in our law-French a feme-covert; is said to be covert-baron, or under the protection and influence of her husband, her baron, or lord; and her condition during her marriage is called her coverture. Upon this principle, of a union of person in husband and wife, depend almost all the legal rights, duties, and disabilities, that either of them acquire by the marriage. I speak not at present of the rights of property, but of such as are merely personal. For this reason, a man cannot grant any thing to his wife, or enter into covenant with her: for the grant would be to suppose her separate existence; and to covenant with her, would be only to covenant with himself: and therefore it is also generally true, that all compacts made between husband and wife, when single, are voided by the intermarriage.

A feme sole had the right to own property and make contracts in her own name, while a feme covert was not recognized as having legal rights and obligations distinct from those of her husband in most respects. Instead, through marriage a woman's existence was incorporated into that of her husband, so that she had very few recognized individual rights of her own. As expressed in Hugo Black's dissent in United States v. Yazell, "This rule [coverture] has worked out in reality to mean that though the husband and wife are one, the one is the husband." A married woman could not own property, sign legal documents or enter into a contract, obtain an education against her husband's wishes, or keep a salary for herself. If a wife was permitted to work, under the laws of coverture, she was required to relinquish her wages to her husband. A feme couvert could not be sued or sue in her own name. In certain cases, a wife did not have individual legal liability for her misdeeds since it was legally assumed that she was acting under the orders of her husband, and generally a husband and a wife were not allowed to testify either for or against each other.

A queen of England, whether she was a queen consort or a queen regnant, was generally exempted from the legal requirements of coverture, as understood by Blackstone.

== History ==
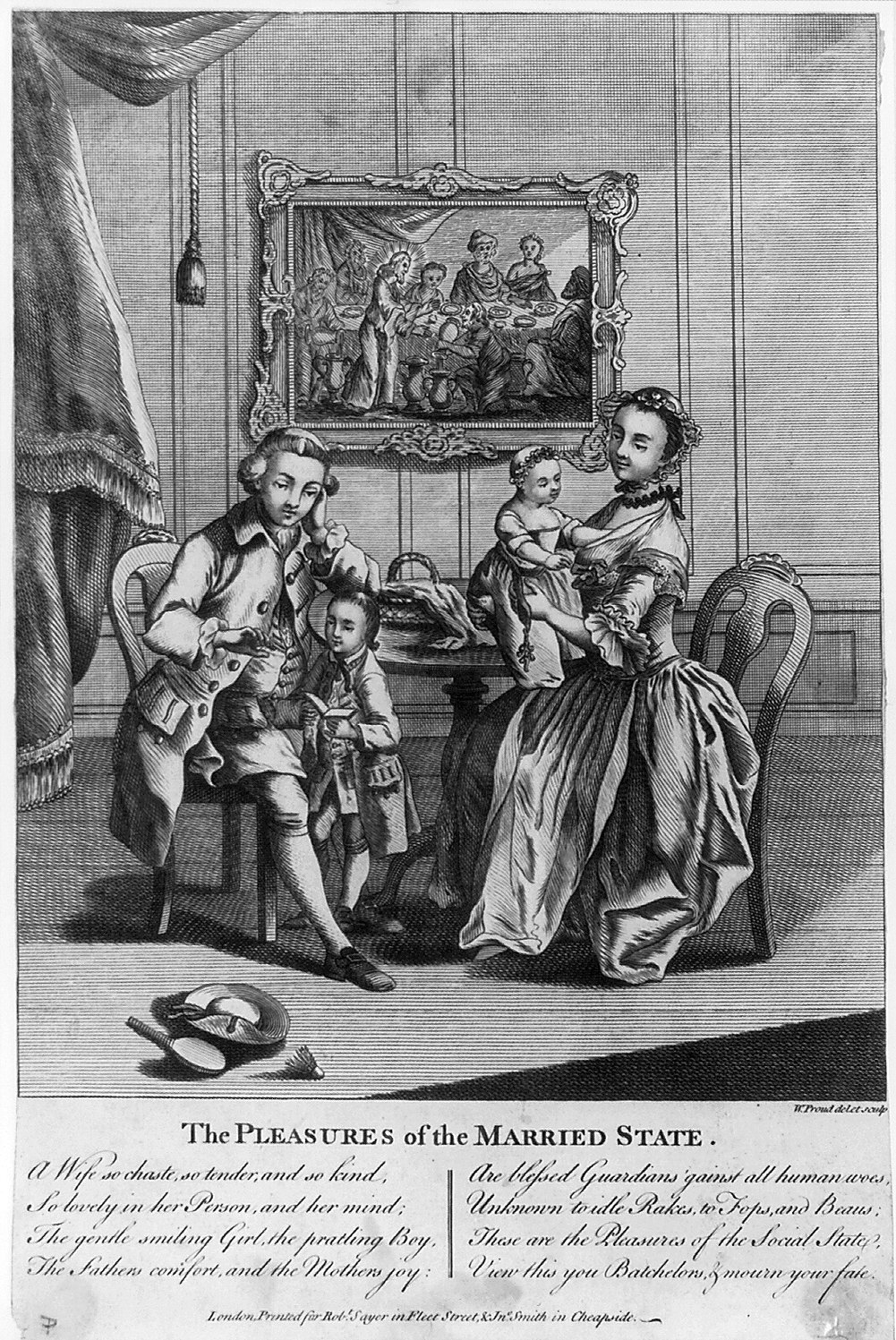
Portrait of an English married couple, circa 1780

The system of feme sole and feme covert developed in England in the High and Late Middle Ages as part of the common law system, which had its origins in the legal reforms of Henry II and other medieval English kings. Medieval legal treatises, such as that famously known as Bracton, described the nature of coverture and its impact on married women's legal actions. Bracton states that husband and wife were a single person, being one flesh and one blood, a principle known as 'unity of person'. Husbands also wielded power over their wives, being their rulers and custodians of their property.

While it was once assumed that married women had little or no access to legal recourse, as a result of coverture, historians have more recently complicated our knowledge of coverture in the Middle Ages through various studies of married women's legal status across different courts and jurisdictions. Collectively, many of these studies have argued that 'there has been a tendency to overplay the extent to which coverture applied', as legal records reveal that married women could possess rights over property, take part in business transactions, and interact with the courts. In medieval post-conquest Wales, it has been suggested that coverture only applied in certain situations. Married women were responsible for their own actions in criminal presentments and defamation, but their husbands represented them in litigation for abduction and in interpersonal pleas.

The extent of coverture in medieval England has also been qualified by the existence of feme sole customs that existed in some medieval English towns. This granted them independent commercial and legal rights as if they were single. This practice is outlined in the custumal of Henry Darcy, Lord Mayor of London in the 1330s, allowing married women working independently of their husband to act as a single woman in all matters concerning her craft, such as renting a shop and suing and being sued for debt. The custom is known to have been adopted in a number of other towns, including Bristol, Lincoln, York, Sandwich, Rye, Carlisle, Chester and Exeter. Some North American British colonies also adopted this custom in the eighteenth century. However, it is unclear how many women took up this status, the extent to which it was legally enforced, or whether the legal and commercial independence it offered were advantageous.

According to Chernock, "coverture, ... [a 1777] author ... concluded, was the product of foreign Norman invasion in the eleventh century—not, as Blackstone would have it, a time-tested 'English' legal practice. This was a reading of British history, then, that put a decidedly feminist twist on the idea of the 'Norman yoke.'" Also according to Chernock, "the Saxons, ... [Calidore] boasted, had encouraged women to 'retain separate property'— ... a clear blow to coverture." (Note: Calidore was a pseudonymous author ("probably ... Andrew Macdonald") of a letter to The Gentleman's Magazine, vol. 58, p. 101 (February, 1788).) Chernock claims that "as the historical accounts of the laws regarding women had indicated, coverture was a policy not just foreign in its origins but also suited to particular and now remote historical conditions." Coverture may not have existed in "the Anglo-Saxon constitution".

Coverture also held sway in English-speaking colonies because of the influence of the English common law there. The way in which coverture operated across the common law world has been the subject of recent studies examining the subordinating effects of marriage for women across medieval and early modern England and North America, in a variety of legal contexts. It has been argued that in practice, most of the rules of coverture "served not to guide every transaction but rather to provide clarity and direction in times of crisis or death." Despite this flexibility, coverture remained a powerful tool of marital inequality for many centuries.

=== Coverture in Early Modern England ===
Before 1870 in England, any money or property received by a married woman in her own name (either through a wage, from investment, by gift, or through inheritance) instantly became absorbed into the property of her husband, as did any property or money held by a woman at the time of her marriage. Thus, under the Common Law doctrine of coverture the identity of the wife became legally absorbed into that of her husband, effectively making them one person in respect of most matters concerned with the ownership and management of land, of payment for goods, and the obtaining of credit.

Where a woman had brought a dowry into the marriage, simply as property, this would also be absorbed into her husband's ownership and control; except that freehold title to any dowered land remained legally hers and it could not be sold by the husband without the consent of the wife. Should the wife survive her husband as a widow, any dowered land reverted to her ownership; and she might also have right to lifetime income from a third of the total value of her husband's estate. However, dowered land could still be seized by the husband's creditors during the marriage for non-payment of his debts. From the 17th century onwards however, dowries as property were commonly secured as a trust to the benefit of the offspring of the marriage in a 'separate estate'. In this form income from the dowry provided by a bride's father was to be used for his daughter's financial support as 'pin money' throughout her married life and into her widowhood, and was also a means by which the bride's father was able to obtain from the bridegroom's father a financial commitment to the intended marriage and to the children resulting therefrom. A dowry could also be applied to support primogeniture when effected by entail and a 'strict settlement'.

Once a woman became married, she had no current claim in Common Law to any property she might then receive, as her husband had full control and could do whatever suited him: "Thus, a woman, on marrying, relinquished her personal property—moveable property such as money, stocks, furniture, and livestock—to her husband's ownership; by law he was permitted to dispose of it at will at any time in the marriage and could even will it away at death". For example, any copyrighted material would have the copyright pass to the husband on marriage. Even after her death, a woman's husband continued to have control over her former property. Nevertheless coverture was always recognised as a convenient legal fiction, and so was never applied absolutely; a wife's property could be seized by creditors for her husband's unpaid debts; but the wife could not then be confined in debtors' prison against repayment of those debts.

However, the Common Law is not the only law of England; and in other English bodies of law - especially Equity) - other principles applied. English courts of Equity, particularly the Court of Chancery, became from the 17th century onwards increasingly amenable to allowing legal devices to evade or negate the perceived injustices of coverture. Within English Law, the Common Law was concerned with real property and inheritance, and here coverture ruled; but courts of Equity were concerned with Wills and Trusts, and were very ready to allow these legal devices to be developed in ways that constrained unlimited control by a husband over their wives' goods, property and inheritance. This was spurred by a particularity of the status of women in the Common Law of England; "English property law was distinctive in two respects: first, married women under coverture were even more restricted than in the rest of Europe; second, single women enjoyed a position unique in Europe as legal individuals in their own right, with no requirement for a male guardian". As a 'feme sole' the legal status of an unmarried woman or widow in England did not differ from that of a man. In circumstances of high adult mortality, many women passed between the status of 'feme sole' and 'feme covert' through successive marriages and widowhoods over an extended period. Many women, at all levels of society, were consequently very concerned to find ways of maintaining effective ownership in a subsequent marriage, of property and dowry that they had brought from a previous marriage; and they had the money to pay lawyers to find legal ways of doing so, and sympathetic courts willing to accommodate them.

Amy Erickson presents the evidence for the legal outcomes, noting that legally enforceable devices to moderate or evade coverture are observed in around 10% of English marriages in the Early Modern period. In more humble marriages these relied on creating nominal bonds secured against dowered property to protect it from being seized by creditors; but where considerable degrees of property were involved, then a Trust would be established before marriage in which the bride's property was held as a 'separate estate' out of the control of her husband. But although this could ensure that property brought into a marriage would not be misused by an improvident or incompetent husband; these arrangements had disadvantages for the wife

1. the wife's separate estate was now under the control of trustees, not the wife herself. The trustees might well not be amenable to acting the way the wife wanted;
2. the prime purpose of the trust was to deliver the property complete to its eventual owners - the offspring of the marriage. Consequently the wife would commonly have access to income not the capital itself;
3. much depended on the discretion allowed to the wife in the terms of the trust; especially whether, were there no surviving offspring, she might direct the distribution of the separate estate by will;
4. arrangements for the control of the separate estate functioned better in respect of funds held in interest-bearing securities, rather than land. In landed property - the core business of the Common Law - coverture was more difficult to evade;
5. the trustees - usually the family lawyers for the wife's parents - would take fees from administering the separate estate; so these devices could only be feasible where significant sums of money were being settled;
6. Separate estates were most easily established prior to a daughter's first marriage - and the practice became effectively universal in even relatively modestly propertied families. If a wife received an inheritance in the course of her marriage, the testator could specify that this should be conveyed into her separate estate; but otherwise such a legacy would come to the husband through coverture. The wife might seek to have the Court of Chancery create a separate estate on her behalf during a marriage. However, the legal costs involved in doing so made this unavailable to the vast majority of the population.

The Married Women's Property Act 1870 provided that wages and property which a wife earned through her own work or inherited would be regarded as her separate property and by the Married Women's Property Act 1882, this principle was extended to all property, regardless of its source or the time of its acquisition. The Act also protected a woman not only from her husband gaining control of her property but also from people that worked for him, his creditor, "These acts generally exempted married women's property from attachments by creditors of their husbands".

=== Criticism ===
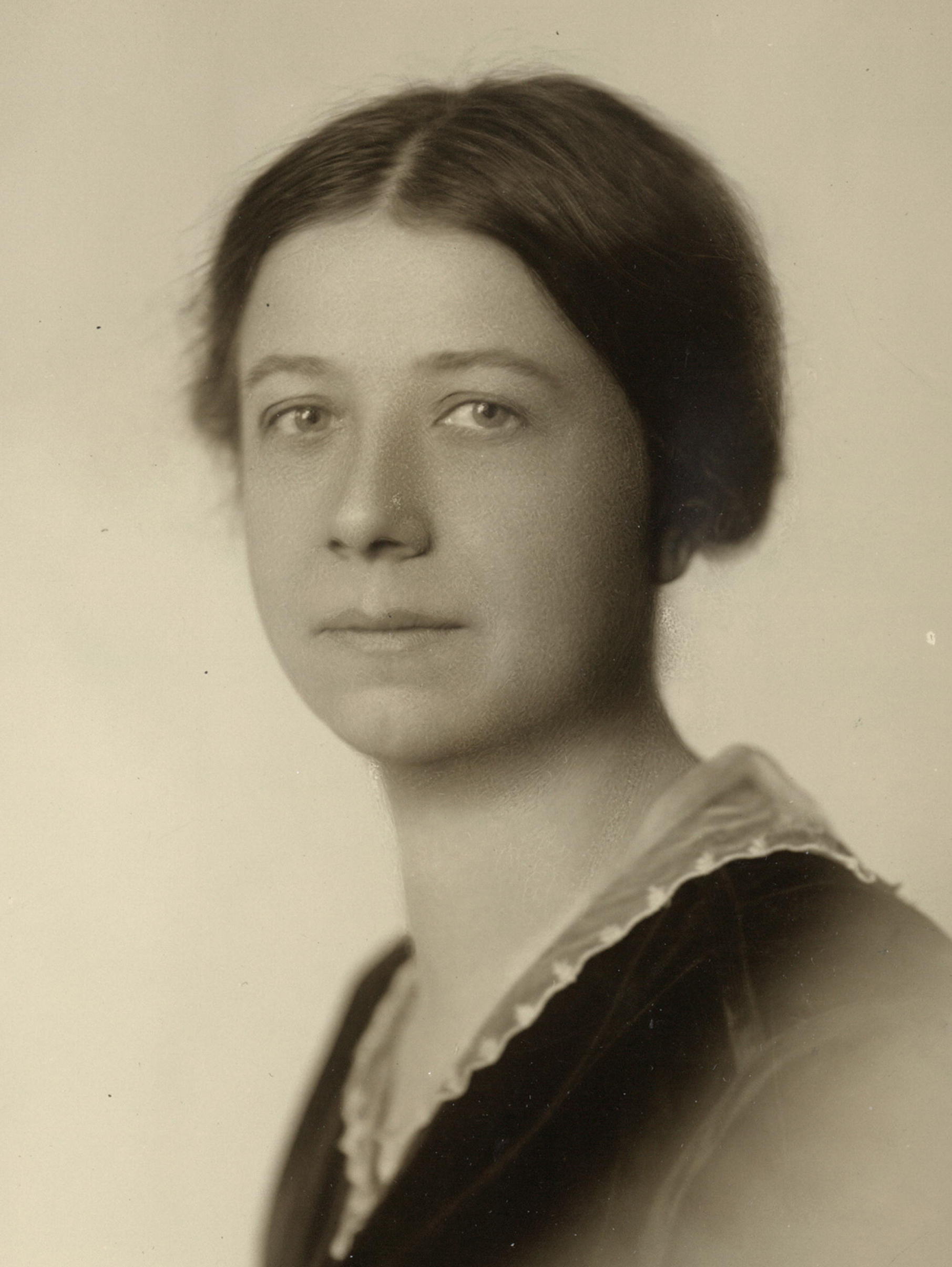
Early feminist historian Mary Ritter Beard

Early feminist historian Mary Ritter Beard held the view that much of the severity of the doctrine of coverture was actually due to Blackstone and other late systematizers rather than due to a genuine old common-law tradition.

In March 1776, Abigail Adams – wife of John Adams, second President of the United States – saw an opportunity in the language of natural rights, and wrote to John Adams:

In the new Code of Laws which I suppose it will be necessary for you to make I desire you would Remember the Ladies, and be more generous and favorable to them than your ancestors. Do not put such unlimited power into the hands of the Husbands. Remember all Men would be tyrants if they could.

Abigail was asking for relief from coverture. John responded, "I cannot but laugh."

According to American historian Arianne Chernock, "late Enlightenment radicals ... argued ... [that 'coverture' and other 'principles'] did not reflect the 'advancements' of a modern, civilized society. Rather, they were markers of past human errors and inconsistencies, and thus in need of further revision." Chernock claimed that "as the editor of Blackstone's Commentaries, [Edward] Christian used his popular thirteenth edition, published in 1800, to highlight the ways in which the practice of coverture might be modified." Chernock wrote that "Christian ... proceeded to recommend that a husband cease to be 'absolutely master of the profits of the wife's lands during the coverture.'" Chernock reported that other men sought for coverture to be modified or eliminated.

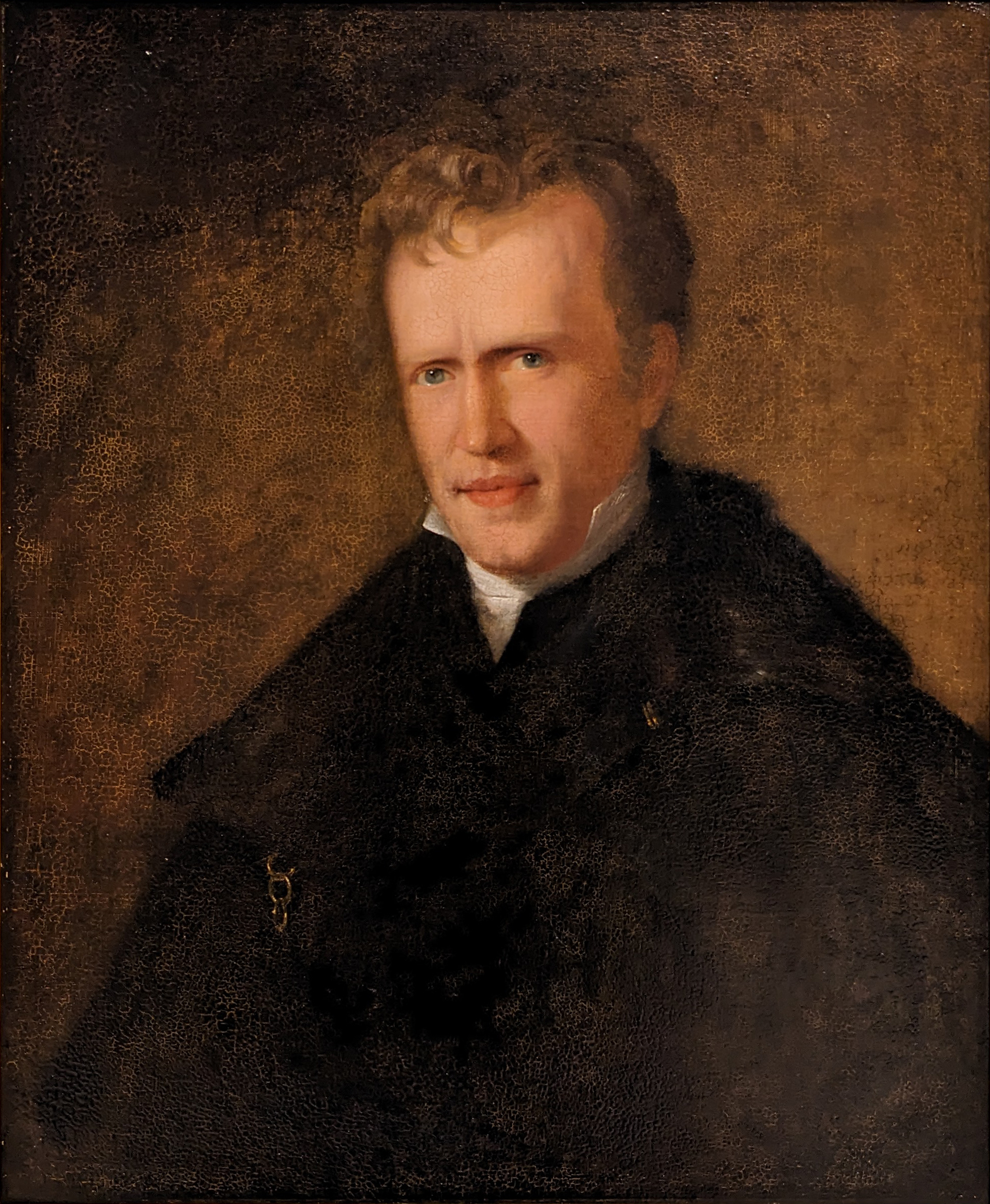
Writer, lawyer, women's rights advocate, and early coverture opponent, John Neal

According to American professor of history and gender studies Ellen Carol DuBois, "the initial target of women's rights protest was the legal doctrine of 'coverture'". The earliest American women's rights lecturer, John Neal attacked coverture in speeches and public debates as early as 1823, but most prominently in the 1840s, asking "how long [women] shall be rendered by law incapable of acquiring, holding, or transmitting property, except under special conditions, like the slave?" In the 1850s, according to DuBois, American suffragist Lucy Stone criticized "the common law of marriage because it 'gives the "custody" of the wife's person to her husband, so that he has a right to her even against herself.'" Stone kept her premarital family name after marriage as a protest "against all manifestations of coverture". DuBois continued, "in the 1850s, ... [t]he primarily legal goal [of 'the American women's rights movement'] was the establishment of basic property rights for women once they were married, which went to the core of the deprivations of coverture." Chernock continued, "for those who determined that legal reforms were the key to achieving a more enlightened relationship between the sexes, coverture was a primary object of attention."

DuBois wrote that coverture, because of property restrictions with the vote, "played a major role in" influencing the effort to secure women's right to vote in the U.S., because one view was that the right should be limited to women who owned property when coverture excluded most women (relatively few were unmarried or widowed), while another view was for the right to be available for all women.

According to American professor of English Melissa J. Homestead, in the mid-19th century, coverture was criticized as depriving married women authors of the financial benefits of their copyrights, including analogizing to slavery; one woman poet "explicitly analogized her legal status as a married woman author to that of an American slave." According to Homestead, feminists also criticized the effect of coverture on rights under patents held by married women.

American professor of history Hendrik Hartog counter-criticized that coverture was only a legal fiction and not descriptive of social reality and that courts applying equity jurisdiction had developed many exceptions to coverture, but, according to American professor of history Norma Basch, the exceptions themselves still required that the woman be dependent on someone and not all agreements between spouses to let wives control their property were enforceable in court.

Writing in 1902 about the progress made in the US, American women's rights activist Susan B. Anthony recalled that the English Common Law of coverture was "in force practically everywhere" in the US in 1848. She said that various aspects of coverture had diminished in the intervening five decades through the passage of local statutes, but minor children were still subject to the will of the father alone in 80% of the states. Though she viewed the "general tendency of legislation for women as progressive," she maintained that "Woman never will have equality of rights anywhere... until she possesses the fundamental right of self-representation," meaning that women would require the ability to vote in order to fully implement equality in marriage.

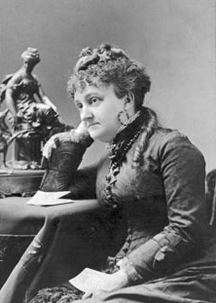
Publisher and activist Myra Bradwell

In 1869, coverture was criticized when American activist Myra Bradwell was refused permission to practice as a lawyer in Illinois specifically because of coverture. In 1871, Bradwell argued to the Supreme Court that coverture violated the Constitution's 14th Amendment. According to American historian Margot Canaday, "coverture's main purpose ... was the legal subordination of women." Canaday continued, "women's legal subordination through marriage ... was maintained in fact across [coverture]".

According to Canaday, "coverture was diminished ... in the 1970s, as part of a broader feminist revolution in law that further weakened the principle that a husband owned a wife's labor (including her person). ... The regime of coverture ... was coming undone [in the mid-20th century]". In 1966, the U.S. Supreme Court said "the institution of coverture is ... obsolete" even while acknowledging coverture's existence in 1–11 states. In a separate opinion in the same case, Hugo Black and two others of the nine justices said the "fiction that the husband and wife are one... in reality ... mean[ing] that though the husband and wife are one, the one is the husband....[,] rested on ... a ... notion that a married woman, being a female, is without capacity to make her own contracts and do her own business", a notion that Black "had supposed is ... completely discredited". Black described modern (as of 1966) coverture as an "archaic remnant of a primitive caste system". Canaday wrote, "the application of equal protection law to marital relations finally eviscerated the law of coverture" (Note: Black's reference to "equal protection law" includes in particular the Fourteenth Amendment to the United States Constitution, ratified in 1868 following the Civil War; though originally intended to recognize equal rights for racial minorities, its wording was not specific to any distinction between classes of people and it was applied to gender in the 20th century.) and "coverture unraveled with accelerating speed [in the late 20th century]". "Coverture's demise blunted (even if it did not eliminate) male privilege within marriage", according to Canaday.

=== Abolition ===
This situation continued until the mid-to-late 19th century, when Married Women's Property Acts started to be passed in many English-speaking jurisdictions, setting the stage for further reforms.

In the United States, many states passed Married Women's Property Acts to eliminate or reduce the effects of coverture. Nineteenth-century courts in the United States also enforced state privy examination laws. A privy examination was an American legal practice in which a married woman who wished to sell her property had to be separately examined by a judge or justice of the peace outside of the presence of her husband and asked if her husband was pressuring her into signing the document. This practice was seen as a means to protect married women's property from overbearing husbands. Other states abolished the concept through court cases, for example: California in Follansbee v. Benzenberg (1954). The abolition of coverture has been seen as "one of the greatest extensions of property rights in human history", and one that led to a number of positive financial and economic impacts. Specifically, it led to shifts in household portfolios, a positive shock to the supply of credit, and a reallocation of labor towards non-agriculture and capital intensive industries.

=== Court cases ===
The United States v. Yazell case (1966) involved the federal government suing the Yazells in the US District Court for the Western District of Texas. Following flood damage to their business, the Yazells received a disaster loan from the Small Business Administration (SBA), with each spouse signing a promissory note "specifically tailored to conform to the requirements of state law." When the Yazells defaulted on the loan and their mortgage was foreclosed on, the Government filed the suit to recover the remaining deficiency. Respondent Mrs Ethel May Yazell "moved for summary judgement." She argued that, under the Texas law of coverture, she was "unable to bind her separate property by contract" without having a court agree to remove the disability. Though she had acquired a notarized acknowledgement for the "transferred security instrument," the respondent had failed to "remove the disability to negotiate the note" in the first place.

The SBA Regional Office and the local counsel the SBA appointed to the Yazells to help them comply with the loan agreement both claimed to have taken "all necessary steps" to "ensure the enforceability of the note." According to the Michigan Law Review, this indicated the following about the case:

"(1) that the SBA must have been aware of the state limitation on respondent's ability to contract", "(2) that the SBA had every intention of dealing within the provisions of the state law," and "(3) that despite this knowledge and intent, the SBA...made no effort to have her remove the disability to negotiate the loan."

The federal district court and the Fifth Circuit Court of Appeals both held that the SBA was "barred recovery against her on the note." Upon review by the US Supreme Court, the verdict was "held, affirmed, three justices dissenting." In its decision, the Court noted that "eleven other states still [had] statutory provisions restricting the capacity of a wife to bind her property by contract."

=== Marital rape laws ===
A significant legal document concerning marital rape was written by Sir Matthew Hale, the Chief Justice in England in 1736. Published within Hale’s History of the Pleas of the Crown, the Lord Hale doctrine, as it came to be known, argued that “the husband cannot be guilty of a rape committed by himself upon his lawful wife”. Hale argued matrimony included a permanent relinquishing of the wife’s rights. He writes: “By their mutual matrimonial consent and contract the wife hath given up herself in this kind to her husband, which she cannot retract.”

According to American psychologist Jennifer Bennice and American professor of psychiatry Patricia Resick, the objectification of the wife and domination of her body by her husband made marital rape unfeasible during the Blackstone era. “...rape was considered a crime against another man’s property rather than a violation against a woman’s body and personal integrity.” Because it was impossible for a man to steal his own property, “it was impossible for husbands to (rape) their own (wives); thus, marital rape was considered a legal impossibility.” Bennice and Resick argue that the United States adopted the Hale Doctrine with relative ease, formally recognizing the exceptionalism of marital rape “in the 1857 Commonwealth v. Fogarty decision.”

A 1874 battery case reasoned that “if no permanent injury has been inflicted, nor malice, cruelty nor dangerous violence shown by the husband, it is better to draw the curtain, shut out the public gaze, and leave the pirates to forget and forgive.”

According to Bennince and Resick, nonintervention standards gave spousal abuse a solid footing as a legal exemption. They write: “the commonly held belief that spousal abuse was a private matter further dissuaded criminal justice officials from taking any legal action.” Sexual relations between spouses remained taboo for state legislators, and fears “among political and legal professionals” that repealing the marital rape exemptions would “flood the courts with vindictive wives” was further motivation to let the exemption stand.

Gradually, changes to existing rape laws gave leeway to modify marital rape laws. Most states by 1980 had nullified resistance and corroboration requirements and the use of sexual activity histories as evidence in rape cases. Within the next decade, around half of all states allowed victims in rape cases to sue for damages. The decision in the 1976 Michigan murder trial of Judy Hartwell gave a wife the “right to defend herself despite the marital rape exemption.” In 1978, John Rideout “became the first husband to be criminally prosecuted for marital rape while still living with his wife.” Though eventually acquitted, Rideout’s highly publicized case “helped to further raise consciousness about marital rape.”

Changes to rape laws were supported by an expansion of activism for women’s marital rights and demands for the illegalization of marital rape beginning in the early 1970s. American psychologist Rebecca Ryan argues that 1970s feminism and its "critique of gender inequality in sexuality” was what allowed for the discrediting of “the exposed sex right in the minds of the legal elite.”

Feminist and activist Laura X, after “learning that marital rape was not a crime in the United States,” brought cases like Judy Hartwell’s and John Rideout’s to the attention of the American public beginning in 1974. In 1978, X established the National Clearinghouse on Marital and Date Rape within the Women’s History Library in Berkeley, California. In 1979, she led a successful campaign to “criminalize marital rape in California. X has since “worked as a consultant to” the National Center for Women and Family Law and the Center for Constitutional Law, organized “the world’s first marital rape conference,” and has founded the Legislation and Litigation Session at the National Conference on Women and the Law.

Efforts by Laura X and others have resulted in substantive change to marital rape laws in the United States. At the time of John Rideout’s trial in 1978, marital rape was a crime in five states. The Federal Sexual Abuse Act “criminalized marital rape on all federal lands” in 1986, and by 1993, marital rape was a crime “in at least one section of the sexual offense codes in all 50 states.” Three years later, in 1996, “16 states had completely repealed their marital rape exemptions”, and 33 states partially repealed their exemptions.

=== Ban of alternative fee arrangements in divorce ===
In the United States, under coverture, because women were not legally capable of entering into contracts, they were not legally capable of securing legal representation for divorce proceedings. Instead, courts ordered the husband to pay an amount called "suit money" that the judge considered reasonable for the wife's divorce lawyer. Wealthy women often had this amount decided in their pre-nuptial agreement. This suit money was only available to wives who were found not to be at fault for the divorce. Because women were property, this fault regime was tied to concepts like the need to be strictly obedient to husbands and was not limited to adultery. A man's access to money during a divorce action was not limited.

Lawyers who wanted to represent women in divorce actions tried to do so on a contingency fee basis, working for no charge until the divorce was finalized and the woman's funds were no longer tied up with the man's. Judges reacted negatively to this. Judges argued that the policy of the law was to encourage reconciliation between the spouses and that allowing lawyers to represent women for free would, instead, encourage them to divorce their husbands. Judges also said that giving women better access to lawyers would allow them to raise more frivolous claims against their husbands. Accordingly, these alternative fee structures were discouraged and banned for divorces despite their wide use in other legal practice areas.

After the abolition of coverture, this ban on alternative fee structures in divorce continued. The ban exists in most states and is enforced by placing it within the local rules of professional responsibility for lawyers, meaning the local legal regulators assert that the practice of representing divorces on contingency is unethical. The ban is now applied to "domestic" areas more broadly than divorce, which is reflected in Rule 1.5(d)(1) of the American Bar Association's Model Rules of Professional Conduct. As written, the ABA's suggested rule bans "any [contingency] fee in a domestic relations matter, the payment or amount of which is contingent upon the securing of a divorce or upon the amount of alimony or support, or property settlement in lieu thereof".

== By country ==
=== India ===
During England’s colonization of India, it introduced various aspects of English common law, including coverture. Prior to colonization, Indian women had much greater economic autonomy than women in England who were subject to coverture. For example, upper class Indian women could become zamindars. Zamindars were wealthy, land owning estate holders and managers that frequently took part in philanthropic and social reform efforts. Munni Begum, consort of Mir Jafar, was a zamindar in the eighteenth century. She established many markets near Murshidabad, and especially loved the masjid and naubatkhana she had built at a site called the Chauk. Using the profits from various markets and shops she had built, Munni Begum sponsored caretakers of mosques, khatib, qaris, travellers, and the bureaucracy (amala) of the entire commercial establishment.

Although coverture was never explicitly transferred to India, the rules of the English East India Company and changes to India’s personal laws reflected the adoption of coverture-like practices. One of the earliest examples of the British East India Company's restriction of women's involvement in the economic sector occurred in 1765 when a contractor and financier for the Company disqualified two elderly, female zamindars on the grounds of "benefit and security to the Government". In 1782, the Company's Committee of revenue planned to end women's managerial authority over their estates for good. The Committee wrote about the "great embarrassment which occurs in the course of our business" because of the "minority or sex of the zamindars". The Committee accused female zamindars of being "especially incapable of managing their own concerns" and stealing all of their collections as estate managers for the Company instead of delivering them to the Company's government. As a result of these accusations, colonial officials implemented elements of coverture from English common law via regulations and the Court of Wards to limit women's financial autonomy.

Another site of coverture adoption was India's system of plural personal laws. According to this system, a woman's rights with regards to marriage, divorce, and inheritance are based on her natal community. However, the Special Marriages Act of 1872 under Parsi personal law only allowed inter-religious marriages if the woman renounced her native religion. If a Parsi woman married out of the community, she had to renounce her religious identity and she and her children would no longer have access to Parsi sacred spaces or trust funds. As a result of these laws, a woman's religious identity is subsumed by her husband’s upon marriage. Her legal identity is therefore also altered by marriage because India's personal laws are based on community identity. In practice, this is very similar to how English women's legal identities are subsumed by their husbands' under coverture.

=== Lebanon ===
In Lebanon, a woman undergoes "civil death" after marriage where her identity is covered by her husband's. While it is not called coverture in Lebanon, it is the same in practice. As a result, wives lose many of their legal rights. A wife cannot: choose her home, choose when she leaves her home, be the guardian of her children after her husband's death (unless a religious court orders it), or be the guardian of her children after divorcing her husband.

Similar to India, Lebanon is ruled by personal status laws which vary based on which community a person belongs to. Under the Christian sect personal status codes, the husband has full control of the money and property his wife brought into the marriage. If the wife wants to give some of her money or property to her children, or use it to make donations to charity, she must first get permission from her husband. This mirrors English coverture because married English women were also not allowed to own property independent of her husband.

Under Greek Orthodox, Evangelical, Catholic, Armenian, and Syriac codes, a mother does not automatically get guardianship of her children after her husband dies. If the husband dies without granting custody to the wife, guardianship of the children transfers to the paternal grandfather, uncle, or cousin. If the widow is granted guardianship but remarries, she automatically loses custody of her children. Since a woman's identity is covered by her husband's, if a woman marries a man who does not have any legal claim to her children then neither does she.

Another example of the husband's identity superseding that of his wife's is that after marriage, a woman's residency status (and therefore her registration to vote) are automatically transferred to her husband's district. This makes it impossible for a married woman to vote or run for office in her native district. While it is impossible to find a direct parallel for this law under English coverture because coverture ended in England (at least explicitly) before women's suffrage, the same principle of a woman's legal identity being surpassed by her husband's identity stays the same.

=== Nigeria ===
Unlike in England under coverture, a married woman can independently own property if she acquires it with her own money under Ibo law in Nigeria. However, some limitations still apply. For example, while a married woman is free to purchase her own property with her own money, she is required to receive permission from her husband in order to accept property as a gift or use credit to buy property. The reason for this is because, similar to coverture in England, a husband is responsible for his wife's debts and other legal obligations.

There are also instances in which a wife's property belongs to the husband, no matter what. For instance, if a woman receives a kola nut tree, it belongs to the husband (not the wife) and he may harvest it for his own benefit. After England established a presence in Nigeria, colonial courts created official law that prevented women from exiting a marriage with properties other than their clothes and kitchen utensils. All other property belongs to the husband or the husband's estate.

Similar to coverture practices in Lebanon, Nigerian women physically leave their native communities to join her husband's family. The switching of communities demonstrates the concept of a wife being absorbed into her husband's identity. It is for this reason that Nigerian women face barriers to inheritance within their birth families. A common explanation for blocking women from receiving inheritance is the need to preserve bloodlines. Since women leave the home and are absorbed into their husband's family, women are not allowed to carry family property to their new home. Essentially, after marriage, women are no longer considered part of the family they were born into.

Women also face barriers to inheritance from their husbands under Yoruba law. The court case Sogunro-Davies v Sogunro-Davies decided that Yoruba law and custom prevents wives from inheriting anything from their husband's estate because "devolution of property follows the blood". The same bloodline argument that is used to cut women out of their birth families' inheritance is also used to cut wives out of their husbands' inheritance. Inversely, according to Igbo law, the husband inherits everything after his wife dies. This aligns with the English view of coverture because the wife's legal identity is absorbed by the husband, so all property acquired by the wife is also absorbed by the husband.

=== Scotland ===
While married women in Scotland retained more autonomy than women in England, they were still limited by coverture. For example, although Scottish women retained control of their inheritance, they forfeited rights to their "moveable property" – bank accounts, jewelry, personal property – to their husbands upon marriage. The husband's right to his wife's moveable property fell under a legal principle of jus mariti. This allowed the husband to manage his wife's property however he chose, with no laws or standards in place to protect the wife's interests. Also under jus mariti, the husband became liable for his wife's debts. This is a common element of coverture found in England, Lebanon, and Nigeria.

A married woman in Scotland could not enter legal contracts because of "her person being quodammodo sunk in that of her husband" so she is therefore not her own entity or a "proper subject of obligation". She could also not grant bonds, promissory notes, guarantees, or bills because of this. This same principle applied to coverture in English common law.

The same social changes that drove England to end coverture in the 1800s led Scotland to adopt a series of statutes that altered husband’s rights. The Married Women's Property (Scotland) Act 1881 gave married women ownership of any moveable property acquired before or during their marriage. Any rent or produce collected as a result of a woman's inherited or moveable property was under the full control of the woman, even after marriage. However, a wife still needed her husband's consent to deal with any capital associated with her moveable property or heritable estate. The Married Women's Property (Scotland) Act 1920 gave married women full control over their heritable and moveable property. It also allowed them to enter contracts, take on debt, and sue or be sued as if they were unmarried.

Despite the formal end of women's legal and financial identities being subsumed by their husbands, married Scottish women were still at a financial disadvantage compared to their male counterparts. The ruling was that the assets of wives and husbands were no longer combined. However, since not very many women entered marriage with significant property and women were not paid equal wages, the end of coverture still resulted in married women owning very little. In 1945, the Harper v Adair case argued that house furniture bought with the husband's money counted as joint property because it was intended for joint use. However, the Lord Justice General ruled that any property bought with the husband's money belonged solely to the husband. This included property purchased with "household allowance" a husband may give his wife, even if the wife was the individual making the transaction. As a result, the vast majority of family property was still controlled by the husband even after the Married Women's Property (Scotland) Acts.

=== United States ===
While state-level passage of the Married Women's Property Acts in the early to mid-19th century improved women's legal standings in the United States, scholars argue difficulties persisted well into the 20th century. According to Joan Hoff, lawyers and judges in the 19th century continued to treat gender stereotyping in the legal profession as "common knowledge". In the 20th and 21st centuries, Hoff argues, state laws grant "privileges and obligations to men and women" based on Common Law thinking that "clearly [give] higher status to men".

The 1974 Georgia Legislature passed a statute defining the husband as the "head of the family", his wife "subject to him", and her legal rights "merged in the husband".

Hoff argues the "modern marriage contract" is a facade, as wives continue to be denied "contractual rights and consensual freedom[s]" determined by unspoken civil roles of the involved parties. These roles, according to Hoff, are based on the "institutionalization of marriage in law, socioeconomic custom, or religion". Marriage is not the contract it is presented as in courts, Hoff says, because "only one party (the male) is automatically invested with power and domination", while the other party, the female, is subject to "patriarchal domination in its most subtle form: voluntary contractualism".

== Analogous concepts outside the common law system ==
In the Roman-Dutch law, the marital power was a doctrine very similar to the doctrine of coverture in the English common law. Under the marital power doctrine, a wife was legally a minor under the guardianship of her husband.

Under the Napoleonic Code – which was very influential both inside and outside of Europe – married women and children were subordinated to the husband's/father's authority. Married French women obtained the right to work without their husband's consent in 1965. In France, the paternal authority of a man over his family was ended in 1970 (before that parental responsibilities belonged solely to the father who made all legal decisions concerning the children); and a new reform in 1985 abolished the stipulation that the father had the sole power to administer the children's property. Neighboring Switzerland was one of the last European countries to establish gender equality in marriage: married women's rights were severely restricted until 1988, when legal reforms providing gender equality in marriage, abolishing the legal authority of the husband, came into force (these reforms had been approved in 1985 in a referendum, with 54.7% votes in favor).

In 1979, Louisiana became the last of the states of the U.S. to have its Head and Master law struck down. An appeal made it to the Supreme Court of the United States in 1980, and in the following year the Court's decision in Kirchberg v. Feenstra effectively declared the practice of male rule in marriage unconstitutional, generally favoring instead a co-administration model.

== Outside the legal realm ==
The doctrine of coverture carried over into English heraldry, in which there were established traditional methods of displaying the coat of arms of an unmarried woman, displaying the coat of arms of a widow, or displaying the combined coat of arms of a couple jointly, but no accepted method of displaying the coat of arms of a married woman separately as an individual.

The traditional practice by which a woman relinquished her name and adopted her husband's name (e.g., "Mrs. John Smith") is similarly a representation of coverture, although usually symbolic rather than legal in form.

In some cultures, particularly in the Anglophone West, wives often change their surnames to that of their husbands upon getting married. Although this procedure is today optional, for some it remains a controversial practice due to its tie to the historical doctrine of coverture or to other similar doctrines in civil law systems, and to the historically subordinated roles of wives; while others argue that today this is merely a harmless tradition that should be accepted as a free choice. Some jurisdictions consider this practice as discriminatory and contrary to women's rights, and have restricted or banned it; for example, since 1983, when Greece adopted a new marriage law which guaranteed gender equality between the spouses, people in Greece are required to keep their birth names for their whole life, although they may add their spouse's name to their own, and they may petition for a name change for "serious" reasons.

== Cultural references ==
In the final scene of William Shakespeare's The Taming of the Shrew, Katherina delivers a monologue about wifely obedience:

Such duty as the subject owes the prince,
Even such a woman oweth her husband;
And when she is froward, peevish, sullen, sour,
And not obedient to his honest will,
What is she but a foul contending rebel
And graceless traitor to her loving lord?

The phrase "the law is an ass" was popularized by Charles Dickens' Oliver Twist, when the character Mr. Bumble is informed that "the law supposes that your wife acts under your direction". Mr. Bumble replies, "if the law supposes that ... the law is a [sic] ass – a idiot. If that's the eye of the law, the law is a bachelor; and the worst I wish the law is that his eye may be opened by experience – by experience."

The television show Frontier House follows three families who are trying to survive six months in the Montana countryside, including growing their own crops and surviving the winter. It takes place during presidency of Abraham Lincoln, who was president when the Homestead Act of 1862 became law. During the show it is noted that coverture was still in effect, so only single women could claim land under the Homestead Act, because married women lost most of their rights.

== See also ==
- Baron and feme
- Curtesy
- Dower
- Jure uxoris ‒ phrase related to a man holding titles of his wife via coverture
- Marriage bar
- Martin v. Massachusetts – an unsuccessful 19th century challenge to coverture in the U.S.
