= Married Women (Restraint upon Anticipation) Act 1949 =

Act of the Parliament of the United Kingdom

Married Women (Restraint upon Anticipation) Act 1949 (Note: Section 2(1).)
- Act of Parliament
- Parliament of the United Kingdom
- Long title: An Act to render inoperative any restriction upon anticipation or alienation attached to the enjoyment of property by a woman.
- Citation: 12, 13 & 14 Geo. 6. c. 78
- Territorial extent: England and Wales (Note: Section 2(2).)

Dates
- Royal assent: 16 December 1949
- Commencement: 16 December 1949 (Note: The Acts of Parliament (Commencement) Act 1793.)

Other legislation
- Amends: Married Women's Property Act 1882; Supreme Court of Judicature (Consolidation) Act 1925; See § Repealed enactments
- Repeals/revokes: See § Repealed enactments
- Amended by: Statute Law Revision Act 1953; Statute Law (Repeals) Act 1969; Statute Law (Repeals) Act 1975

Status: Amended

Text of statute as originally enacted

Revised text of statute as amended

Text of the Married Women (Restraint upon Anticipation) Act 1949 as in force today (including any amendments) within the United Kingdom, from legislation.gov.uk.

The Married Women (Restraint upon Anticipation) Act 1949 (12, 13 & 14 Geo. 6. c. 78) is an act of the Parliament of the United Kingdom that abolished the doctrine of restraint upon anticipation as applied to the property rights of women in England and Wales.

== Provisions ==
Section 1(1) of the act provided that no restriction upon anticipation or alienation attached to the enjoyment of any property by a woman, which could not have been attached to the enjoyment of that property by a man, should be of any effect after its passing. Section 1(3) of the act made consequential amendments to two enactments, listed in the first schedule to the act.

=== Repealed enactments ===
Section 1(4) of the act repealed 8 enactments, listed in the second schedule to the act.

Citation	Short title	Extent of repeal
20 & 21 Vict. c. 57	Married Women's Reversionary Interests Act 1857	In section one, the proviso.
56 & 57 Vict. c. 63	Married Women's Property Act 1893	Section two.
4 & 5 Geo. 5. c. 59	Bankruptcy Act 1914	Section fifty-two.
15 & 16 Geo. 5. c. 18	Settled Land Act 1925	In section one, in subsection (1), paragraph (iv).
15 & 16 Geo. 5. c. 18	Settled Land Act 1925	In section twenty, in subsection (1), paragraph (x).
15 & 16 Geo. 5. c. 18	Settled Land Act 1925	In section twenty-five, subsection (2).
15 & 16 Geo. 5. c. 19	Trustee Act 1925	In section sixty-two, in subsection (1), the words from "and notwithstanding" to "anticipation".
15 & 16 Geo. 5. c. 20	Law of Property Act 1925	In section one hundred and fifty-three, in subsection (6), in paragraph (i), the words "or is subject to a restraint on anticipation".
15 & 16 Geo. 5. c. 20	Law of Property Act 1925	In section one hundred and sixty-nine, the words "is restrained from anticipation or from alienation" and the word "or" where it occurs for the third time.
25 & 26 Geo. 5. c. 30	Law Reform (Married Women and Tortfeasors) Act 1935	In section two, in subsection (1), the proviso, and subsections (2) and (3).
11 & 12 Geo. 6. c. 63	Agricultural Holdings Act 1948	In section eighty-five, in paragraph (a), the words "and is not restrained from anticipation".
