= Head and Master law =

American property laws, fully repealed in 1979

The "Head and Master" laws were a set of American property laws that permitted a husband to have final say regarding all household decisions and jointly owned property without his wife's knowledge or consent. In 1979, Louisiana became the final state to repeal them. Until then, the matter of who paid for property or whose name was on the deed had been irrelevant.

== Supreme Court cases and unconstitutionality ==
In Louisiana, in 1974, Joan Feenstra's husband was incarcerated for molesting their young daughter. To pay his lawyer, he mortgaged their home, which the law did not require his wife's knowledge or permission to do, despite the fact that the wife herself had fully paid for the house. Feenstra then dropped the charges, legally separated from her husband, and returned to court to challenge the constitutionality of the law. The Supreme Court, in Kirchberg v. Feenstra (1981), invalidated the mortgage, concluding that the statute was, in fact, unconstitutional.

In 2015, during oral arguments in the same-sex marriage case Obergefell v. Hodges U.S. Supreme Court Justice Ruth Bader Ginsburg used the example of the Supreme Court's striking down of Louisiana's Head and Master rule to illustrate how "traditional" concepts of marriage had been revised over time.

== See also ==
- Coverture
- Marital power
- Marriage bar
