= Law Reform (Married Women and Tortfeasors) Act 1935 =

Act of the Parliament of the United Kingdom

Law Reform (Married Women and Tortfeasors) Act 1935 (Note: Section 8(1).)
- Act of Parliament
- Parliament of the United Kingdom
- Long title: An Act to amend the law relating to the capacity, property, and liabilities of married women, and the liabilities of husbands; and to amend the law relating to proceedings against, and contribution between, tort-feasors.
- Citation: 25 & 26 Geo. 5. c. 30
- Territorial extent: England and Wales (Note: Section 8(2).)

Dates
- Royal assent: 2 August 1935
- Commencement: 2 August 1935 (Part I) (Note: The Acts of Parliament (Commencement) Act 1793.); Date appointed by the Lord Chancellor (Part II) (Note: Section 7.)

Other legislation
- Amends: Married Women's Property Act 1882; Larceny Act 1916; Supreme Court of Judicature (Consolidation) Act 1925; See § Repealed enactments
- Repeals/revokes: See § Repealed enactments
- Amended by: Married Women (Restraint upon Anticipation) Act 1949; Statute Law Revision Act 1950; Law Reform (Husband and Wife) Act 1962; Statute Law (Repeals) Act 1969; Civil Liability (Contribution) Act 1978

Status: Amended

Text of statute as originally enacted

Revised text of statute as amended

Text of the Law Reform (Married Women and Tortfeasors) Act 1935 as in force today (including any amendments) within the United Kingdom, from legislation.gov.uk.

The Law Reform (Married Women and Tortfeasors) Act 1935 (25 & 26 Geo. 5. c. 30) is an act of the Parliament of the United Kingdom that amended the law relating to the capacity, property, and liabilities of married women in England and Wales.

== Provisions ==
=== Repealed enactments ===
Section 5(2) of the act repealed 14 enactments, listed in the second schedule to the act.

Citation	Short title	Description	Extent of repeal
2 & 3 Anne. c. 20 (Note: This is the citation in The Statutes of the Realm.)	Queen Anne's Bounty Act 1703	An Act the title of which begins with the words "An Act for the making more effectuall" and ends with the words "for the same purpose."	In section six the words "or women covert without their husbands."
43 Geo. 3. c. 108	Gifts for Churches Act 1803	The Gifts for Churches Act, 1803.	In section one the words "nor women covert without their husbands."
55 Geo. 3. c. 147	Glebe Exchange Act 1815	The Glebe Exchange Act, 1815.	In section five the words "or femes covert without their husbands"; in section twelve the words "husbands", "feme coverts", and "feme covert"; in section thirteen the word "husbands", and the words "femes covert"; and in section seventeen the words "or feme couvert," "or husband," "or she," and "or feme sole."
3 & 4 Will. 4. c. 74	Fines and Recoveries Act 1833	The Fines and Recoveries Act, 1833.	Section twenty-four.
4 & 5 Vict. c. 20	Excise Management Act 1841	The Excise Management Act, 1841.	In section seven the words "whose husband shall become insane or idiot or be otherwise rendered incapable of transacting his affairs or whose husband shall be separated from her and be out of the limits of the United Kingdom" and the proviso.
4 & 5 Vict. c. 38	School Sites Act 1841	The School Sites Act, 1841.	In section five the words "and her husband".
36 & 37 Vict. c. 50	Places of Worship Sites Act 1873	The Places of Worship Sites Act, 1873.	In section one the words "or a married woman" and the word "husband"; and in section three the words "and her husband".
45 & 46 Vict. c. 75	Married Women's Property Act 1882	The Married Women's Property Act, 1882.	Sections one to five; in section six the word "separate" where that word first occurs; and the words "for her separate use"; in section seven the word "separate" where that word first occurs, and the words from "whether the same" to "recorded, or not"; in section eleven the words "by virtue of the power of making contracts hereinbefore contained"; in section twelve the word "separate"; in section thirteen the words "in respect and to the extent of her separate property" and the words from "and all sums recovered" to "recovered in respect thereof"; sections fourteen and fifteen; in section twenty-three the word "separate."
56 & 57 Vict. c. 63	Married Women's Property Act 1893	The Married Women's Property Act, 1893.	Section one.
7 Edw. 7. c. 18	Married Women's Property Act 1907	The Married Women's Property Act, 1907.	In section three the words "which is by virtue of the Married Women's Property Act, 1882, made her separate property."
1 & 2 Geo. 5. c. 46	Copyright Act 1911	The Copyright Act, 1911.	In section sixteen, in subsection (4) thereof, the word "separate."
4 & 5 Geo. 5. c. 59	Bankruptcy Act 1914	The Bankruptcy Act, 1914.	In section fifty-two, the word "separate"; and section one hundred and twenty-five.
6 & 7 Geo. 5. c. 50	Larceny Act 1916	The Larceny Act, 1916.	In section thirty-six, in subsection (1) thereof the word "separate."
20 & 21 Geo. 5. c. 17	Poor Law Act 1930	The Poor Law Act, 1930.	In section fourteen, in subsection (4) thereof, the word "separate."

== Subsequent developments ==
Section 6 of the act was repealed by section 9(2) of, and schedule 2 to, the Civil Liability (Contribution) Act 1978, which came into force on 1 January 1979.
