= Married Women's Property Act 1882 =

Act of the Parliament of the United Kingdom

Married Women's Property Act 1882 (Note: Section 27.)
- Act of Parliament
- Parliament of the United Kingdom
- Long title: An act to consolidate and amend the law relating to the property of married women.
- Citation: 45 & 46 Vict. c. 75
- Territorial extent: England and Wales; Ireland (Note: Section 26.)

Dates
- Royal assent: 18 August 1882
- Commencement: 1 January 1883 (Note: Section 25.)
Other legislation
Repeals/revokes	Married Women's Property Act 1870; Married Women's Property Act (1870) Amendment Act 1874
Amended by	Married Women’s Property Act 1882; Married Women's Property Act 1884; Married Women's Property Act 1893; Married Women's Property Act 1907; Law Reform (Married Women and Tortfeasors) Act 1935; Married Women (Restraint upon Anticipation) Act 1949; Theft Act 1968; Poor Law Act 1927; Law Reform (Husband and Wife) Act 1962; Family Law Reform Act 1969; Statute Law (Repeals) Act 1969; Matrimonial Proceedings and Property Act 1970
Relates to	Married Women's Property (Scotland) Act 1881

Status: Amended

Text of statute as originally enacted

Revised text of statute as amended

Text of the Married Women’s Property Act 1882 as in force today (including any amendments) within the United Kingdom, from legislation.gov.uk.

The Married Women's Property Act 1882 (45 & 46 Vict. c. 75) is an act of the Parliament of the United Kingdom that supplemented the provisions of the Married Women's Property Act 1870 (33 & 34 Vict. c. 93), significantly extending the property rights of married women under English, Welsh, and Irish law. Besides other matters the act increased the extent to which married women could own and control property in their own right.

The act applied in England (and Wales) and Ireland, but did not extend to Scotland. The Married Women's Property Act was a model for similar legislation in other British territories. For example, Victoria passed legislation in 1884, New South Wales in 1889, and the remaining Australian colonies passed similar legislation between 1890 and 1897.

== English women's property rights ==
English common law defined the role of the wife as a feme covert, emphasising her subordination to her husband, and putting her under the "protection and influence of her husband, her baron, or lord". Upon marriage, the husband and wife became one person under the law, as the property of the wife was surrendered to her husband, and her status as a separate legal personality — with the ability to own property, and sue and be sued solely in her own name — ceased to exist. Any personal property acquired by the wife during the marriage, unless specified that it was for her own separate use, went automatically to her husband. If a woman writer had copyright before marriage, the copyright would pass to the husband afterwards, for instance. Further, a married woman was unable to draft a will or dispose of any property without her husband's consent.

Women were limited in what they could inherit. Males were more likely to receive real property (land), while females with brothers were sometimes limited to inherited personal property, which included clothing, jewellery, household furniture, food, and all movable goods. In an instance where no will was found, the English law of primogeniture automatically gave the oldest son the right to all real property, and the daughter only inherited real property in the absence of a male heir. The law of intestate primogeniture remained on the statute books in Britain until the Law of Property Act 1925 (15 & 16 Geo. 5. c. 20) simplified and updated England's archaic law of real property.

Aware of their daughters' unfortunate situation, fathers often provided them with dowries or worked into a prenuptial agreement pin money, the estate which the wife was to possess for her sole and separate use not subject to the control of her husband, to provide her with an income separate from his. This could be done by conveying property to 'feoffees-to-use', or trustees, who would legally hold the property 'to her use' (in respect of income) and to her offspring (as the ultimate beneficiaries). The wife would then receive the benefits of the property through her control of the trustees and would be able to dispose of it after her death by will amongst the offspring of the marriage.

In contrast to wives, women who never married or who were widowed maintained control over their property and inheritance, owned land and controlled property-disposal, since by law any unmarried adult female was a feme sole. Once married, the only way that women could reclaim property was through widowhood. The few exceptions of married women who were femes sole were queens of England, and Margaret Beaufort, who was declared to be a feme sole by a 1485 act of parliament passed by her son Henry VII of England, in spite of the fact that Beaufort was still married to Thomas Stanley, Earl of Derby.

The dissolution of a marriage, whether initiated by the husband or wife, usually left the divorced females impoverished, as the law offered them no rights to marital property. The 1836 Caroline Norton court-case highlighted the injustice of English property-laws, and generated enough support to result in the act.

== Provisions ==
After years of political lobbying, the act addressed the grievances presented by English women. The act altered the common law doctrine of coverture to include the wife's right to own, buy and sell her separate property. Wives' legal identities were also restored, as the courts were forced to recognize a husband and a wife as two separate legal entities, in the same manner as if the wife was a feme sole. Married women's legal rights included the right to sue and be sued. Any damages a wife might pay would be her own responsibility, instead of that of her husband. Married women were then also liable for their own debts, and any outside trade they owned was subject to bankruptcy laws. Further, married women were able to hold stock in their own names. (Note: Trevor May, ' holding meetings')

=== Repealed enactments ===
Section 22 of the act repealed the Married Women's Property Act 1870 (33 & 34 Vict. c. 93) and the Married Women's Property Act (1870) Amendment Act 1874 (37 & 38 Vict. c. 50).

=== Short title, commencement, extent ===
Section 25 of the act provided that the act would come into force on 1 January 1883.

Section 26 of the act provided that the act would not extend to Scotland.

Section 27 of the act provided that the act may be cited as the Married Women's Property Act, 1882.

== Subsequent developments ==
The following provisions were repealed by section 1 of, and part III of the schedule to, the Statute Law (Repeals) Act 1969, which came into force on 1 January 1970.

- Sections 6–9.
- In section 11 the words from " If at the time of the death of the insured" to "the same ".
- Section 13.
- In section 17 the words from " or any such bank" to " are standing ", and the final proviso.
- Sections 18 and 19.
- In section 24 the words from the beginning to " administration ".
- Section 25.

Much of the act was repealed between 1898 and 1969; only sections 6, 10, 11 and 17 remain, in modified form. Of these, one of the more important was s. 11, which provided that a widow could in her own right enforce her late husband's life assurance policy. (Also, the Contracts (Rights of Third Parties) Act 1999 enables both men and women to enforce contracts drawn up by others for their benefit.)

== See also ==
- Coverture
- Married Women's Property Act 1870
- Married Women's Property Acts in the United States
- Primogeniture
