= Married Women's Property Act 1884 =

Act of the Parliament of the United Kingdom

Married Women's Property Act 1884 (Note: Section 2.)
- Act of Parliament
- Parliament of the United Kingdom
- Long title: An Act to amend the sixteenth section of the Married Women's Property Act, 1882.
- Citation: 47 & 48 Vict. c. 14
- Territorial extent: United Kingdom

Dates
- Royal assent: 23 June 1884
- Commencement: 23 June 1884 (Note: The Acts of Parliament (Commencement) Act 1793.)
- Repealed: 1 January 1969
Other legislation
| Amends | Married Women's Property Act 1882 |
| Repealed by | Theft Act 1968 |

Status: Repealed

Text of statute as originally enacted

The Married Women's Property Act 1884 (47 & 48 Vict. c. 14) was an act of the Parliament of the United Kingdom. The act relates solely to the giving of evidence in criminal matters, by husband and wife.

== Subsequent developments ==
The whole act was repealed for England and Wales and Scotland by section 33(3) of, and part II of schedule 3 to, the Theft Act 1968 (c. 60), subject to section 35(3), which came into force on 1 January 1969.

The whole act was repealed for the Republic of Ireland, by section 19 of, and the Schedule to, the Married Women's Status Act 1957.

== See also ==
- Feme covert
- Married Women's Property Act 1882
- Primogeniture

== Bibliography ==
- The Routledge Dictionary of Modern British History, p. 193, at Google Books
- Archibald Brown. The Married Women's Property Acts, 1870, 1874, 1882 and 1884. Sixth Edition. Stevens and Haynes. London. 1891. Page 93.
- Charles Gregory Wade. The Married Women's Property Act, 1893. Hayes Brothers. Elizabeth Street, Sydney. 1894. Pages 279 and 280.
- John Fraser Macqueen and Wyatt Paine. The Rights and Liabilities of Husband and Wife. Fourth Edition. Sweet and Maxwell. 1905. Page 89.
- "Art III - Married Women's Property Act Amendment Bill" (1884) 15 Englishwoman's Review of Social and Industrial Questions 210
- Halsbury's Statutes of England. Second Edition. Volume 11. Pages 807 and 808.
- J M Lely. "Married Women's Property Act, 1884". The Statutes of Practical Utility. (Chitty's Statutes). Fifth Edition. Sweet & Maxwell. Stevens and Sons. 1895. Volume 7. Title "Married Women's Property". Page 13. See also pages 8 and 10.
- W Paterson (ed). "Married Women's Property Act, 1884". The Practical Statutes of the Session 1884. Horace Cox. London. 1884. Pages 26 to 29.
- Harry Greenwood and Lees Knowles. Real Property Statutes. Second Edition. Stevens and Sons. 1884. Pages 393, 397 and 398.
- Louis Arthur Goodeve. The Modern Law of Real Property. Second Edition. W Maxwell & Son. 1885. Pages 568 and 571.
- "The Married Women's Property Act, 1884". Hood & Challis's Property, Settled Land, Trustee and Administration Acts. Eighth Edition. Stevens and Sons, Limited. 1938. Page 774.
- John Hutchinson. The Practice of Banking. Effingham Wilson and Co. London. Percival Pearse. Warrington. 1887. Pages 703 and 704.
- (1954) 218 The Law Times 16 and 17 (9 July 1954)
