= Privy examination =

American legal practice to protect married women

A privy examination, or "separate examination", was a United States legal practice in which a married woman who wished to sell her property had to be separately examined by a judge or justice of the peace outside of the presence of her husband and asked if her husband was pressuring her into signing the document. This practice, which emerged from English common law, was seen as a means to protect married women's property from overbearing husbands. A number of U.S. states continued to require privy examinations into the late 20th century.
