= Married Women's Property Act 1870 =

Act of the Parliament of the United Kingdom

Married Women's Property Act 1870 (Note: Section 17.)
- Act of Parliament
- Parliament of the United Kingdom
- Long title: An Act to amend the law relating to the property of married women.
- Citation: 33 & 34 Vict. c. 93
- Territorial extent: England and Wales; Ireland; (Note: Section 16.)

Dates
- Royal assent: 9 August 1870
- Commencement: 9 August 1870 (Note: Section 15.)
- Repealed: 1 January 1883
Other legislation
Amended by	Married Women's Property Act 1870 Amendment Act 1874
Repealed by	Married Women's Property Act 1882
Relates to	Married Women's Property (Scotland) Act 1881

Status: Repealed

Text of statute as originally enacted

The Married Women's Property Act 1870 (33 & 34 Vict. c. 93) was an act of the Parliament of the United Kingdom that allowed married women to be the legal owners of the money they earned and to inherit property in their own name.

== Background ==
Before 1870 in England, any money or property received by a married woman in her own name (either through a wage, from investment, by gift, or through inheritance) instantly became absorbed into the property of her husband, as did any property or money held by a woman at the time of her marriage. Thus, under the Common Law doctrine of coverture the identity of the wife became legally absorbed into that of her husband, effectively making them one person in respect of most matters concerned with the ownership and management of land, of payment for goods, and the obtaining of credit.

Where a woman had brought a dowry into the marriage, simply as property, this would also be absorbed into her husband's ownership and control; except that the freehold title to any dowered land remained legally hers and it could not be sold by the husband without the consent of the wife. Should the wife survive her husband as a widow, any dowered land reverted to her ownership; and she might also have right to lifetime income from a third of the total value of her husband's estate. However, dowered land could still be seized by the husband's creditors during the marriage for non-payment of his debts. From the 17th century onward however, dowries as property were commonly secured as a trust to the benefit of the offspring of the marriage in a 'separate estate'. In this form the dowry provided by a bride's father was to be used for his daughter's financial support as 'pin money' throughout her married life and into her widowhood, and was also a means by which the bride's father was able to obtain from the bridegroom's father a financial commitment to the intended marriage and to the children resulting therefrom. A dowry could also be applied to support primogeniture when effected by entail and a 'strict settlement'.

Once a woman became married, she had no current claim to her property in Common Law, as her husband had full control and could do whatever suited him regarding the property: "Thus, a woman, on marrying, relinquished her personal property—moveable property such as money, stocks, furniture, and livestock—to her husband's ownership; by law he was permitted to dispose of it at will at any time in the marriage and could even will it away at death". For example, any copyrighted material would have the copyright pass to the husband on marriage. Even in death, a woman's husband continued to have control over her former property. Before the act was passed, women lost all Common Law ownership over their property when they became married: "From the early thirteenth century until 1870, English Common law held that most of the property that a wife had owned as a feme sole came under the control of the husband at the time of the marriage". Nevertheless coverture was always recognised as a convenient legal fiction, and so was never applied absolutely; a wife's property could be seized by credtiors for her husband's unpaid debts, but a wife could not be tried for her husband's crimes. However, the Common Law is not the only law of England; and in other English bodies of law - especially Equity - other principles applied. English courts of Equity, particularly the Court of Chancery, became from the 17th century onwards increasingly amenable to allowing legal devices to evade or negate the perceived injustices of coverture. Within English Law, the Common Law was concerned with real property and inheritance, and here coverture ruled; but courts of Equity were concerned with Wills and Trusts, and were very ready to allow these legal devices to be developed in ways that constrained unlimited control by a husband over their wives' goods, property and inheritance. This was spurred by a particularity of the status of women in the Common Law of England; "English property law was distinctive in two respects: first, married women under coverture were even more restricted than in the rest of Europe; second, single women enjoyed a position unique in Europe as legal individuals in their own right, with no requirement for a male guardian". As a 'feme sole' the legal status of an unmarried woman or widow in England did not differ from that of a man. In circumstances of high adult mortality, many women passed between the status of 'feme sole' and 'feme covert' through successive marriages and widowhoods over an extended period. Many women, at all levels of society, were consequently very concerned to find ways of maintaining effective ownership in a subsequent marriage, of property and dowry that they had brought from a previous marriage; and they had the money to pay lawyers to find legal ways of doing so, and sympathetic courts willing to accommodate them.

Amy Erickson presents the evidence for the legal outcomes, noting that legally enforceable devices to moderate or evade coverture are observed in around 10% of English marriages in the Early Modern period. In more humble marriages these relied on creating nominal bonds secured against dowered property to protect it from being seized by creditors; but where considerable degrees of property were involved, then a Trust would be established before marriage in which the bride's property was held as a 'separate estate' out of the control of her husband. But although this could ensure that property brought into a marriage would not be misused by an improvident or incompetent husband; these arrangements had disadvantages for the wife

1. the wife's separate estate was now under the control of trustees, not the wife herself. The trustees might well not be amenable to acting the way the wife wanted;
2. the prime purpose of the trust was to deliver the property complete to its eventual owners - the offspring of the marriage. Consequently the wife would commonly have access to income not the capital itself;
3. much depended on the discretion allowed to the wife in the terms of the trust; especially whether, were there no surviving offspring, she might direct the distribution of the separate estate by will;
4. arrangements for the control of the separate estate functioned better in respect of funds held in interest-bearing securities, rather than land. In landed property - the core business of the Common Law - coverture was more difficult to evade;
5. the trustees - usually the family lawyers for the wife's parents - would take fees from administering the separate estate; so these devices could only be feasible where significant sums of money were being settled;
6. Separate estates were most easily established prior to a daughter's first marriage - and the practice became effectively universal in even relatively modestly propertied families. If a wife received an inheritance in the course of her marriage, the testator could specify that this should be conveyed into her separate estate; but otherwise such a legacy would come to the husband through coverture. The wife might seek to have the Court of Chancery create a separate estate on her behalf during a marriage. However, the legal costs involved in doing so made this unavailable to the vast majority of the population.

Married women had few legal rights in the Common Law; and those that they did have - as in the right for support and maintenance at their husband's expense - were not easily enforceable. Wives were by Common Law not recognized as being a separate legal being – a feme sole. In contrast, single and widowed women were considered in Common Law to be femes sole, and they already had the right to own property in their own names. Once a woman became married, she still had the right to legally own her land or house but she no longer had the right to do anything with it, such as rent out a house that she owned or sell her piece of land: "Thus, a wife retained legal ownership of her real property—immovable property such as housing and land, but she could not manage or control it; she could not sell her real property, rent it, or mortgage it without her husband's consent". She could not make contracts without his approval. Nor could she sue or be sued in a court of law.

Women started to try to get the act passed in the 1850s; a group of professional women artists, writers and painters, had campaigned for the law to be amended with no success. One important woman taking up the cause was Barbara Bodichon (1827–1891). She promoted women's rights and in 1854 published A Brief Summary of the Laws in England concerning Women: together with a few observations thereon. She worked hard to reform the married women's property laws. As an artist, she also helped establish the Society for Female Artists in 1857. In 1865, she founded the women-only Kensington Society, for which she wrote Reasons for the Enfranchisement of Women in 1866. She was also an intimate friend of George Eliot (the pen name of Mary Ann Evans), who wrote Middlemarch.

In 1868, efforts to get the act passed were revived; in that year, a Married Women's Property Bill was introduced into parliament, which proposed that married women should have the same property rights as unmarried women. A long and energetic campaign by women's groups and some men led to the passing of this Act.

The act provided that wages and property which a wife earned through her own work or inherited would be regarded as her separate property and by the Married Women's Property Act 1882 (45 & 46 Vict. c. 75), this principle was extended to all property, regardless of its source or the time of its acquisition. The act also protected a woman not only from her husband gaining control of her property but also from people that worked for him, his creditor, "These acts generally exempted married women's property from attachments by creditors of their husbands".

This gave married women a separate statutory estate and released them from coverture. It was for the first time theoretically possible for married women to live away from their husbands and support children. Widowed women with children, as femes soles, had already had the right to own property and support their children.

== Provisions ==
The most important sections of the act were:

1. The wages and earning made by a wife were to be held by her for her own separate use, independently from her husband. The meaning of wages included money made from any employment, occupation, or trade, or the use of any skill such as a literary, scientific, or artistic skill that resulted in money being made. This section also covered investments made with the money earned.
2. This section dealt mostly with the inheritance of property. A wife was allowed to keep any property she inherited from her next of kin as her own, subject to that property not being bound in a trust. She could also inherit money up to £200.
3. This section allowed a married woman to continue to hold rented property in her own name and to inherit rented property.
4. This section made married women liable to maintain her children from the profits earned from her personal property. It also continued the liability of the husband to maintain his children. In effect, this section made both parents legally liable while each spouse held separate property.

=== Short title, commencement and extent ===
Section 15 of the act provided that the act would come into force on the passing of the act.

Section 16 of the act provided that the act would not extend to Scotland.

Section 17 of the act provided that the act may be cited as the Married Women's Property Act, 1870.

== Shortcomings ==
The act dealt mostly with the earnings of married women and was not very specific about married women's property rights. A major loophole was that any personal property (personalty) as opposed to real property a woman had in her own name before marriage still legally became her husband's property: money, furniture, stocks and livestock. Women married thereafter were entitled up to a fairly good sum of property (£200) in their own names ("absolutely") from their next of kin. It did not speak for an amount in excess of £200. The act was not retrospective — all women who married before it could not recover into their sole name the property they had held before marriage (if they had any). This greatly limited the effect.

== Subsequent developments ==
The act's full significance was that, for the first time in British history, it allowed newly married women to forever legally keep their own earnings and inherit property. It also put a legal duty on married women to maintain their children alongside their husband's. Women who married before the act still ceded ownership over their property. They also did not have authority over any children that they bore during the marriage, which "deprived her of all authority over her children and of any contractual capacity during his [her husband's] life". When this Act was passed it was in a time when women had very few rights. Women were not allowed to vote in parliamentary elections; It could be argued that the act paved the way towards women's right to vote, since it extended female property rights. It sidelined one of the reasons women were denied the right: "Coverture was also used as a reason to deny women the vote and public office because of the assumption that a married woman would be represented by her husband. The end of coverture certainly ranks along with suffrage as the sine qua non [inception] of public recognition of women's autonomy and personhood". Women before were not seen as individuals who could have their own vote let alone be elected; their husbands by tradition would take control of such matters. The act helped lay the groundwork for a superseding, enhanced-rights version, the Married Women's Property Act 1882 (45 & 46 Vict. c. 75) and for the Representation of the People Act 1918 (7 & 8 Geo. 5. c. 64) that granted many women over the age of thirty the right to vote in the United Kingdom.

== Criticism ==
Much negative feedback to Parliament flowed when the act was passed in 1870. It has been argued that the act was not focused on benefiting women and it was actually focused on the fraud that married couples commit: "a study of Parliamentary debates and Chancery Court cases argues that the passage of the British Act had more to do with controlling fraud committed by married couples (who colluded to defeat the law of debt) than the rights of married women". This opinion was controversial because many feminists saw the act as a huge success for women who were married.

There was a focus put on the arguments in the home that would arise from the act being passed: "The most striking feature of the debates on the Married Women's Property Bills is how little time was spent discussing the principle of sexual equality, and how much time was spent discussing the idea that giving married women property rights would cause discord in the home". Instead of talk of equality there was talk about how negative the act was for the household because it would be the cause of arguments at the home. It was said that a house can only be a truly happy home if the husband was in charge and the wife was submissive: "There was no place in the Victorian home for disputes between husbands and wives if the home was to be the 'sweetest, cheerfullest place' that the husband could find refuge in. Within the terms of separate spheres ideology, this household harmony could only be achieved by the total subordination of women to their husbands".

== See also ==
- Coverture
- Married Women's Property Act 1882

== Bibliography ==
- Combs, Mary Beth (December 2005). ""A Measure of Legal Independence": The 1870 Married Women's Property Act and the Portfolio Allocations of British Wives". The Journal of Economic History. 65 (4): 1028–1057. doi:10.1017/s0022050705000392. JSTOR 3874913. S2CID 154367840.
- Griffin, Ben (2003). "Class, Gender, and Liberalism in Parliament, 1868-1882: The Case of the Married Women's Property Acts". The Historical Journal. 46 (1): 59–87. doi:10.1017/s0018246x02002844. S2CID 159520710.
- Shanley, Mary Lyndon (1986). "Suffrage, Protective Labor Legislation, and Married Women's Property Laws in England". Signs. 12 (1): 62–77. doi:10.1086/494297. S2CID 144723898.
