= Married Women's Property Acts in the United States =

American law

The Married Women's Property Acts are laws enacted by the individual states of the United States beginning in 1839, usually under that name and sometimes, especially when extending the provisions of a Married Women's Property Act, under names describing a specific provision, such as the Married Women's Earnings Act. The Married Women's Property Acts gave American married women new economic rights. Under coverture (an English common law system), married women could not own property, control their wages, enter into contracts, and otherwise act autonomously, to their husband's authority. They also did not have control over where their children lived and husbands were assumed to have sexual access (there was no marital rape).

The Married Women's Property Acts addressed the economic side of coverture, allowing women more control of wages and property. After New York passed its Married Women's Property Law in 1848, New York's law became the template for other states to grant married women the right to own property.

== Background ==
Under the common law legal doctrine known as coverture, a married woman in British North American colonies and later in the United States had hardly any legal existence apart from her husband. Her rights and obligations were subsumed under his. She could not own property, enter into contracts, bring a lawsuit, or earn a salary in her name. An unmarried woman, a femme sole, on the other hand, had the right to own property and make contracts in her name.

Over several decades, beginning in 1839, statutes that enabled women to control real and personal property, enter into contracts and lawsuits, inherit independently of their husbands, work for a salary, and write wills were enacted. The first such law was in Mississippi, which in 1839 granted married women the right to own (but not control) property in her own name. It was enacted after a successful case by a Chickasaw woman, Betsy Love Allen, prevented a creditor of her husband from seizing her separately owned slaves. Maine and Maryland did likewise in 1840. In 1842, New Hampshire allowed married women to own and manage property in their own name during the incapacity of their husband, and Kentucky did the same in 1843. In 1844 Maine extended married women property rights by granting them separate economy and then trade licenses. Massachusetts also granted married women separate economy in 1844.

Usually, concerns for family integrity and protecting a household from economic crisis, rather than a liberal conception of the role of women in society, motivated these changes. Change came in piecemeal fashion. As late as 1867 a decision of the Supreme Court of Illinois in Cole v. Van Riper noted that "It is simply impossible that a married woman should be able to control and enjoy her property as if she were sole, without practically leaving her at liberty to annul the marriage." According to one analysis, the legislation came in three phases—allowing married women to own property, then to keep their own income, then to engage in business—and advanced more quickly in the West, exactly like female suffrage did.

== State by state ==
=== Connecticut ===
Women in the Northern states were the principal advocates of enhancing women's property rights.

Connecticut's law of 1809 allowing a married woman to write a will was a forerunner, though its impact on property and contracts was so slight that it is not counted as the first statute to address married women's property rights.

=== Southern states ===
The Panic of 1837 inspired attempts in the Southern states to limit the impact of such an economic crisis by protecting family assets. Mississippi initiated the trend in 1839 with its Married Women's Property Act that allowed married women to own property. Any attempt by her husband to collect debt could not reach property only she owned. She had the right to refuse to sell the property, but could not manage that property or sell it without her husband's consent. Parents who gave property to a daughter upon marriage also enjoyed the protection the Act provided from a son-in-law's mishandling of his family's affairs. The property a woman could own and protect from her husband's creditors included slaves.

Maryland enacted important legislation in 1843 and Arkansas enacted legislation in 1846.

=== Texas ===
Texas, still an independent republic rather than a state, passed its act in 1840. It was the most expansive legislation of any enacted in the South and allowed a married woman to enter into certain contracts, write a will, and sue for divorce. Not only could she veto the sale of her property, but she could veto the sale of the family homestead even if she was not its owner. Without referencing the independence of the wife that advocates for such legislation envisioned, legislators argued that the legislation protected the wife and children from irresponsible husbands.

=== Midwestern States ===
Midwestern states that enacted legislation included Michigan in 1844, which covered both real and personal property obtained by a woman before or during her marriage. More limited statutes were passed during the next two years in Ohio, Indiana, and Iowa. (Iowa became a state in 1846)

=== New York ===
In 1845, New York granted a married woman who secured "a patent for her own invention" the right to hold it and retain all earnings from it "as if unmarried". The Married Women's Property Act was enacted on April 7, 1848, as part of a more general movement, underway since the 1820s, away from common law traditions in favor of the codification of law. Ernestine Rose had been campaigning for such a statute since 1836, later joined by Paulina Wright Davis and Elizabeth Cady Stanton. It significantly altered the law regarding the property rights granted to married women, allowing them to own and control their own property. It was used as a model by several other states in the 1850s. It provided that:

- The real and personal property of any female who may hereafter marry, and which she shall own at the time of marriage, and the rents issues and profits thereof shall not be subject to the disposal of her husband, nor be liable for his debts, and shall continue her sole and separate property, as if she were a single female.
- The real and personal property, and the rents issues and profits thereof of any female now married shall not be subject to the disposal of her husband; but shall be her sole and separate property as if she were a single female except so far as the same may be liable for the debts of her husband heretofore contracted.
- It shall be lawful for any married female to receive, by gift, grant devise or bequest, from any person other than her husband and hold to her sole and separate use, as if she were a single female, real and personal property, and the rents, issues and profits thereof, and the same shall not be subject to the disposal of her husband, nor be liable for his debts.
- All contracts made between persons in contemplation of marriage shall remain in full force after such marriage takes place.

=== Pennsylvania ===
Also in 1845, Pennsylvania followed similar legislation to New York's. In July, 1848 the Seneca Falls Convention, the first women's rights convention, approved a "Declaration of Sentiments" authored by Elizabeth Cady Stanton that listed among the "injuries and usurpations on the part of man toward woman":

He has made her, if married, in the eye of the law, civilly dead.
He has taken from her all right in property, even to the wages she earns.
He has so framed the laws of divorce, as to what shall be the proper causes of divorce, in case of separation, to whom the guardianship of the children shall be given; as to be wholly regardless of the happiness of the women—the law, in all cases, going upon a false supposition of the supremacy of a man, and giving all power into his hands.

=== California ===
In an exception to the statutory expansion of the legal rights of married women, the California Constitution of 1849, drawing on the community property tradition of Spanish civil law rather than the common law tradition, distinguished a wife's property from community property: "All property, both real and personal, of the wife, owned or claimed by her before marriage, and that acquired afterward by gift, devise, or descent, shall be her separate property; and laws shall be passed more clearly defining the rights of the wife in relation as well to her separate property, as to that held in common with her husband."

=== New Jersey ===
New Jersey passed a limited statute in 1852 and in 1874 another version that one historian described as "comprehensive and progressive".

=== Massachusetts ===
Massachusetts passed its Married Women's Property Act on May 5, 1855. It allowed married women to own and sell real and personal property, control their earnings, to sue and to make wills. Other legislation enacted that year made divorce and remarriage easier, provided protections for divorced women, and removed the five-year waiting period before a wife could file for divorce on the grounds of desertion.

=== Western states ===
The original state constitutions of Kansas (1859), Oregon (1857), and Nevada (1864) guaranteed the right of women to own property without respect to marital status.

== Outcomes and backlash ==
The movement to expand the property rights of married women did not go unchallenged. Virginia debated and rejected such legislation in the 1840s. In 1849, the Tennessee legislature stated, in one historian's account, "that married women lack independent souls and thus should not be allowed to own property." New York expanded its statute in 1860, with the Married Women's Earnings Act. It then repealed parts of its legislation in 1862, eliminating a married woman's right to guardianship of her children and the right of a widow to manage her late husband's estate.

As of 1860, 14 states had passed some version of this statute. By the end of the Civil War, 29 states had passed some version of a Married Women's Property Act.

As the U.S. Congress considered legislation to protect the civil rights of African-Americans that became the Civil Rights Act of 1866, opponents of the legislation charged that it would alter the legal status of married women. Senator Edgar Cowan, a supporter of the legislature ridiculed that suggestion: "What was the involuntary servitude mentioned there? ... Was it the right the husband had to the service of his wife? Nobody can pretend that those things were within the purview of that amendment; nobody believes it."

In the years following the Civil War, Harriet Beecher Stowe campaigned for the expansion of married women's rights, arguing in 1869 that:

[T]he position of a married woman ... is, in many respects, precisely similar to that of the negro slave. She can make no contract and hold no property; whatever she inherits or earns becomes at that moment the property of her husband. ... Though he acquired a fortune through her, or though she earn a fortune through her talents, he is the sole master of it, and she cannot draw a penny. ... [I]n the English common law a married woman is nothing at all. She passes out of legal existence.

The changing statutes and differences among the states complicated the situation of female authors. A married woman's right to contract with a publisher and to control what her writings earned depended on the state or states where she and her husband lived at the time. As of 1887, one-third of the states had not provided statutory protection for a married woman to control her earnings. Three states gave married women no legal status until late in the nineteenth century: Delaware, South Carolina, and Virginia. Even where statutes appeared to establish some measure of rights for a married woman, courts interpreted statutes to her disadvantage and relied on common law whenever a statute was less than explicit.

=== Interspousal Tort Liability ===
The married women's property acts gave women the right to bring lawsuits in their own name, but courts were reluctant to extend that right to the marriage relationship. Between 1860 and 1913, courts narrowly interpreted marriage property acts so as to not allow spouses to sue each other for tortious acts. For a short time between 1914 and 1920, courts began to relax their interpretations and allow suits for torts such as assault and intentional infliction of venereal disease. However, the next two decades saw regression in this trend with the vast majority of courts choosing not to recognize either intentional or negligent tort suits between spouses. Some scholars argue that patriarchal restrictions were what led to this reaction from the courts, but others argue that the rise of suits arising from negligent automobile accidents had more impact on the courts. The fear of collusion and insurance fraud that also led to guest statutes are more likely the reason behind courts disallowing interspousal tort suits than the patriarchy.

== See also ==
- Chastisement
- Feminism in the United States
- Timeline of women's rights (other than voting)
