= Kirchberg v. Feenstra =

- Supreme Court of the United States

Argued December 10, 1980 Decided March 23, 1981
- Full case name: Kirchberg v. Feenstra et al.
- Citations: 450 U.S. 455 (more) 101 S. Ct. 1195; 67 L. Ed. 2d 428

Holding
- The Head and Master law violates the Equal Protection Clause. Gender-based discrimination is unconstitutional absent a showing that the classification substantially furthers an important governmental interest.

Court membership
- Chief Justice Warren E. Burger Associate Justices William J. Brennan Jr. · Potter Stewart; Byron White · Thurgood Marshall; Harry Blackmun · Lewis F. Powell Jr. William Rehnquist · John P. Stevens

Case opinions
- Majority: Marshall, joined by Burger, Brennan, White, Blackmun, Powell, Stevens
- Concurrence: Stewart, joined by Rehnquist

Kirchberg v. Feenstra, 450 U.S. 455 (1981), was a United States Supreme Court case in which the Court held a Louisiana Head and Master law, which gave sole control of marital property to the husband and indicated the husband's dominance over the wife in the marriage, unconstitutional.

== Background ==
In 1974, Joan Feenstra charged her husband Harold with having molested their daughter. Harold hired an attorney, Karl Kirchberg, to defend himself against the charges, and mortgaged the Feenstras' home toward paying the cost of that attorney. Joan was not informed of this mortgage because Head and Master provisions of Louisiana law allowed him to do so without her consent or knowledge. She dropped the charges, and the couple separated. Joan did not learn about the mortgage until 1976, when Harold's attorney returned to demand payment and threatened foreclosure. She then filed a lawsuit arguing that Louisiana's laws giving sole control of marital property to the husband were unconstitutional.

The district court upheld Louisiana's law. On appeal, the Fifth Circuit overturned the district court, finding the law unconstitutionally violated the Equal Protection Clause, but limited the application of their ruling to future decisions. Feenstra appealed to the Supreme Court.

== Opinion of the Court ==
Applying intermediate scrutiny as they had in Craig v. Boren, the court held that Louisiana's law lacked an "exceedingly persuasive justification" for its sex-based classification, and therefore was in violation of the Equal Protection Clause of the Fourteenth Amendment.

== Further developments ==
In 1980, during the appeals process, Louisiana changed their laws to eliminate the Head and Master provisions.

== Obergefell v. Hodges ==
In 2015, during oral arguments in the same-sex marriage case Obergefell v. Hodges U.S. Supreme Court Justice Ruth Bader Ginsburg used the example of the Supreme Court's striking down of Louisiana's Head and Master rule in Kirchberg v. Feenstra to illustrate how "traditional" concepts of marriage had been revised over time.

We have changed our idea about marriage is the point that I made earlier. Marriage today is not what it was under the common law tradition, under the civil law tradition. Marriage was a relationship of a dominant male to a subordinate female. That ended as a result of this Court's decision in 1982 when Louisiana's Head and Master Rule was struck down. And no State was allowed to have such a—such a marriage anymore. Would that be a choice that a State should be allowed to have?

— Justice Ginsburg,
