= Legal rights of women in history =

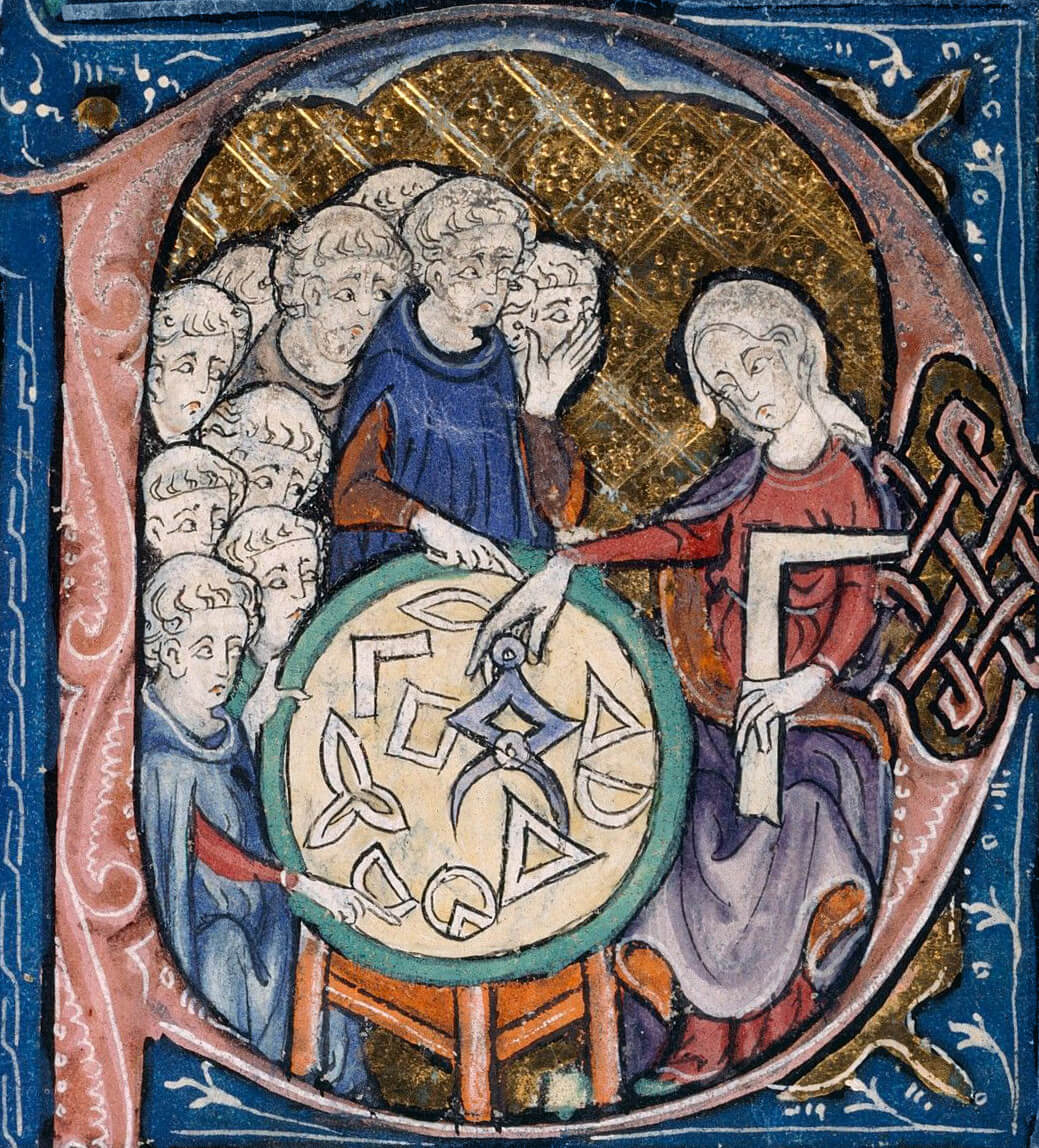
This illustration, from a medieval translation (c. 1310) of Euclid's Elements, is noteworthy in showing a woman teaching geometry to male students.

The legal rights of women refers to the social and human rights of women. One of the first women's rights declarations was the Declaration of Sentiments. The dependent position of women in early law is proved by the evidence of most ancient systems.

== Mosaic law ==
In the Mosaic law, for monetary matters, women's and men's rights were almost exactly equal. A woman was entitled to her own private property, including land, livestock, slaves, and servants. A woman had the right to inherit whatever anyone bequeathed to her as a death gift, and in the absence of sons would receive everything. A woman could likewise bequeath her belongings to others as a death gift. Upon dying intestate, a woman's property would be inherited by her children if she had them, her husband if she was married, or her father if she were single. A woman could sue in court and did not need a male to represent her.

In some situations, women actually had more rights than men. For example, captive women had to be ransomed prior to any male captives. Even though sons inherited property, they had a responsibility to support their mother and sisters from the estate, and had to ensure that both mother and sisters were taken care of prior to their being able to benefit from the inheritance, and if that wiped out the estate, the boys had to supplement their income from elsewhere.

When it came to religious or sacramental activities, women had fewer rights and opportunities than men. For example, in monetary or capital cases women could not serve as witnesses. A woman could not serve as a kohen in the Temple. A woman could not serve as queen regnant, the monarch had to be male. A divorce could be granted only by the husband, upon which time she would receive the Ketubah and the return of a significant portion of her dowry. The religious vow of an unmarried girl was able to be nullified by her father, and the vow of a wife could be annulled by her husband. The guilt or innocence of a wife accused of adultery might be tested through the Sotah process, although this only was successful if the husband was innocent of adultery. Daughters could inherit only in the absence of sons. Daughters who inherited were required to marry within their own tribe, because their property was transferred to their husbands upon marriage.

== Mesopotamian law ==
In Ancient Mesopotamia, the legal status of women was related directly to how females were characterized in society. Most mentions of women were in relation to fertility, property, or sex and these laws dictated both the severity of the punishment as well as the way the situation was handled by the community based on the social status of the person in question. The Code of Hammurabi provides evidence that women in these societies had limited rights when it came to divorce, fertility, property, and sex.

A way to examine the legal status of women under The Code of Hammurabi is by looking at the laws pertaining to inheritance. In the absence of a dowry, daughters were to be included in the inheritance after their father's death and have legal rights to collect a portion of moveable goods from the paternal house. Women could inherit assets or money from their father or mother, creating a level of legal equality to men in Mesopotamian society in that the value of their inheritance or dowry belonged to them personally. If a married woman died, her dowry was to be divided amongst her children and not returned to her father. If a man should die who has children that he does not raise or recognize, then his first-ranking wife has a legal right to receive both her dowry and marriage settlement, retain residence in her husband's home, and pass on her own property to her children. There were limits to her legal rights: she was not allowed to sell her deceased husband's home. The slave women in question, along with any of her children, would be freed. If the children the slave women had with the master of the household were recognized by him as his own children, upon his death, the estate would have been divided equally between the children of the slave woman and the first ranking wife. Sources use these legal examples to show that children were not granted more or less money solely based on their mother's societal ranking.

Another way in which the legal status of women in Mesopotamian society can be examined is through their fertility rights, which demonstrates the laws categorizing women based on their social status. If a noble beat a pregnant woman so severely that she miscarried her child, he would be forced to pay restitution. The amount of the compensation was determined by the social status of the expecting mother, ten shekels of silver for the fetus of a noblewoman, five for the fetus of a woman from the commoner class, and two for the fetus of a noble's slave woman.

The legal rights of Mesopotamian women can be further examined through the lens of assault. Men were given punishments for the crimes they committed. The Code of Hammurabi dictated that if a father raped his daughter, he would be banished from the city. The punishment dictated for a man who rapes a virgin bride during the engagement period for which she still lives with her family is much harsher. In this situation, the rapist is executed, and the woman is allowed to go free.

Laws regulating sex were also prominent in Mesopotamian law. Adultery was seen as a crime against the community and its morals. Though the husband was not entitled to any financial compensation or the right to lessen his wife's punishment under the law he could save her from execution. If a wife of another man was caught laying with another man, The Code of Hammurabi states that they should be executed together, unless the husband allows his wife to live in which case the king would also pardon the man she engaged in relations with. If a husband accuses his wife of adultery without catching her in the act, all she must do is swear her innocence in an oath to god. If she is accused by someone who is not her husband under the same circumstances, she must submit to the Divine River ordeal to prove her innocence to her husband.

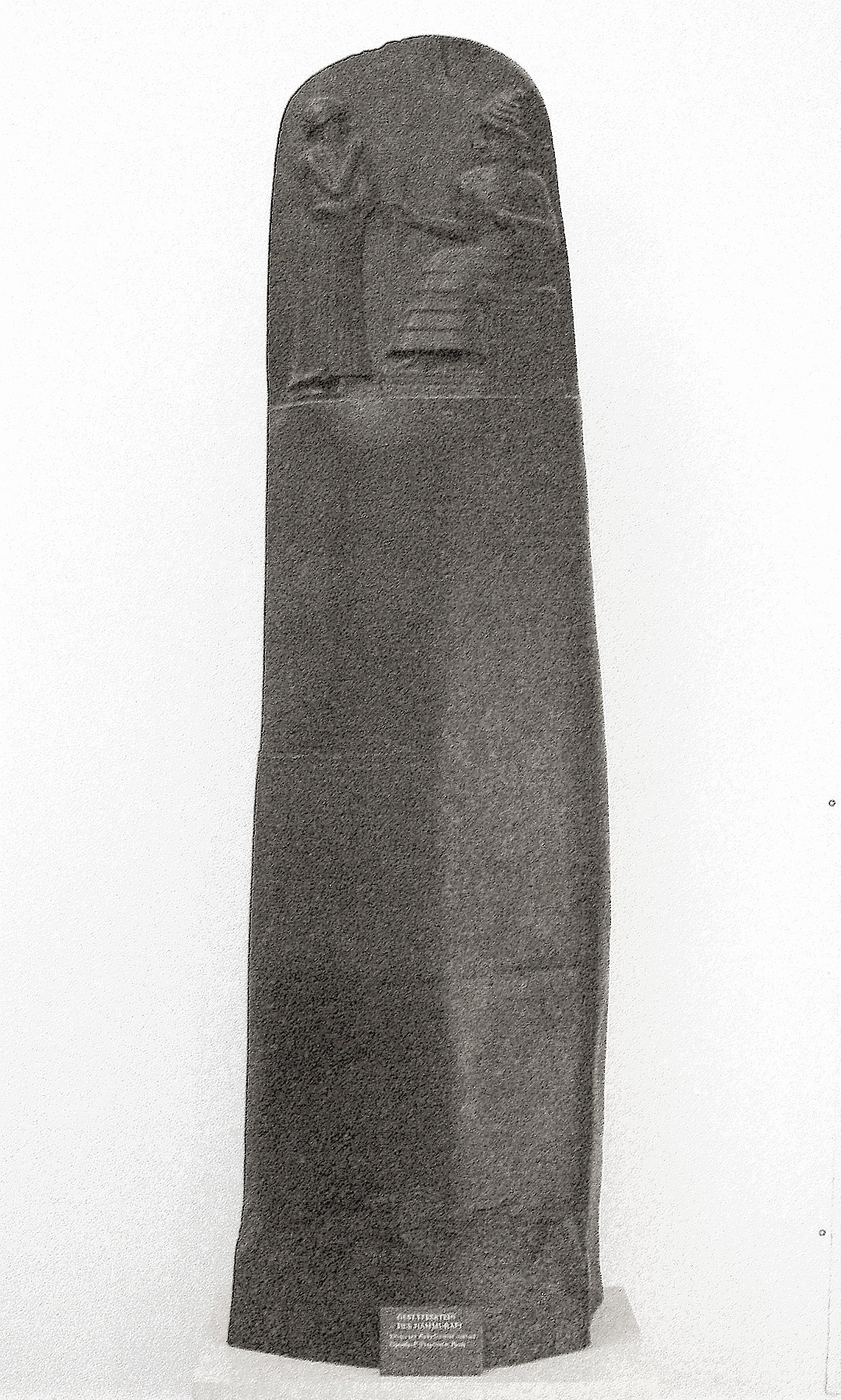
Basalt slate erected by King Hammurabi and inscribed with law code.

Though Mesopotamian law allowed a woman to function on her own, the societal norm was to act under the management of a male family member such as a brother, husband, or adult son. Rarely were single women in charge of their own households without a masculine influence.

== Egyptian law ==
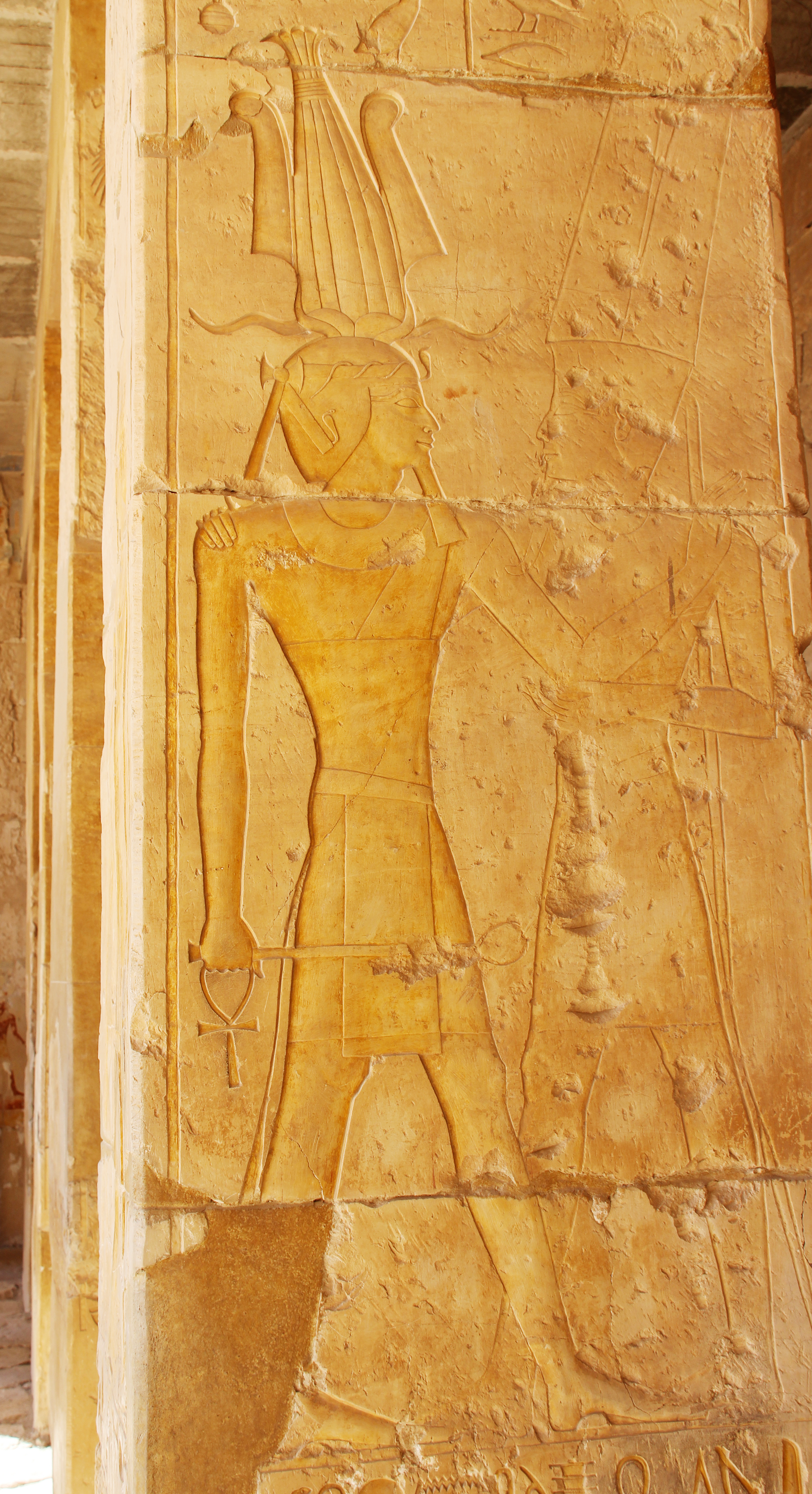
Carving on mortuary temple wall of Hatshepsut.

In Ancient Egypt, legally, a woman shared the same rights and status as a man – at least, theoretically. An Egyptian woman was entitled to her own private property, which could include land, livestock, slaves and servants, etc. She had the right to inherit whatever anyone bequeathed to her, as well as bequeathing her belongings to others. She could divorce her husband (upon which all possessions belonging to her – including the dowry – were reverted to her sole ownership), and sue in court. A husband can be flogged and/or fined for beating his wife.

When it came to the legal rights of women in ancient Egypt, they seemed to enjoy a variety of more rights than their other ancient female counterparts. On the surface it would be easy to write off saying that females and males had equal rights when looking at the surface level of their rights, but if one were to look at the bigger picture, that image is chipped away. One interesting view into the legal standing of women is the practice of crime and punishment. When looking through the lens of adultery we can see what effects it would have on a woman's legal standing. Adultery was not only looked at as a form of crime that put her property at risk, but also as a moral crime/failing. When men and women committed adultery it was a clear violation of their marriage contracts and other forms of public and personal contacts, such as wills. Depending on the different sources on the topic, a range of different punishments could result if a woman either committed adultery herself or was the woman who was the mistress. One thing that was always up for debate once the adultery was brought against her was the question of her rights being stripped of her. Such rights that are up for debate include her property and rights to her dowry, in certain instances. Who was handing down the punishment could determine how much of her property or dowry could be taken away, which could be determined by a woman's status in society, among other deciding factors. Different sources talk about harsh punishments for both parties involved in an adulterous relationship, with early accounts claiming that if a woman was found guilty, she could have her nose lopped off and a man could receive lashes for such actions.

Most notably, a woman could conduct legal matters without a male to represent her. However, the average woman still centered her time around the home and family. When looking at other facets of marriage and family life in ancient Egypt, women of the time had more of an upper hand than the rest of women from surrounding cultures. The evidence that has survived usually describes the internal affairs of elite marriages and family, which seem to paint an image of greater equality within the family. Within Egyptian culture family traced its lineage through matrilineal descent. This emphasis on women can also be seen in how property rights were passed from mother to daughter. One thing that should be pointed out about this is that even if the property rights were passed through matrilineal descent it did not mean that men relinquished the overall control of the property. Equal status between men and women in marriage in ancient Egypt can also be interpreted in how men and women are pictured in different art forms of being seated together as equals or a female standing behind with an arm around her husband also alluding to a shared power relationship. Certain inscriptions have also been found that depict these power relations as well as listing certain titles elite women could hold Women, unlike their female counterparts in other regions of the world, also enjoyed being in public and could own businesses. They had a right to be able to work outside the home, whether that be alongside their husbands or by owning a business of their own. Inside the home the wife's opinion in matters might reign supreme or have great influence in certain affairs to maintain balance within the home. Their opinion could be voiced when it came to negotiating contracts outside the house, but not always as the main deal broker . A defining piece of an ancient Egyptian marriage which laid out the rights of both parties involved was the marriage contract. The marriage contracts that have been reviewed show that in the case of divorce or even the death of the husband, property and any monetary funds would be bestowed upon her.

A few women became pharaohs (Hatshepsut and Cleopatra), and women held important positions in government and trade. When it came to elite women in ancient Egypt there were few women who made it to the top of the hierarchy: to be a pharaoh. As listed before, the two most well known are Hatshepsut and Cleopatra VII. They held the same types of rights and prestige as their male counterparts, but their rule was not the common way of inheritance of the throne. The rights of women in ancient Egypt overall were seen as greater than that of other women of the time, but they still had restrictions to their power. Whether that be through limiting certain public interactions or family negotiations or even having their rights curtailed because of having an adulterous affair, but in a theoretical sense in the biggest ways that count men and women shared a balanced sort of rights within society.

== Hittite law ==
In Hittite law, there were parts where women had similar rights to men as well as other sections where they were treated differently or unequally. In general, women had just as much right to have their legal cases heard as men did. This is one aspect where they enjoyed the same rights that men did. In addition, Hittite women were also given more freedom in terms of their place in society. For instance, they were not relegated to the household; in fact, they were open to joining every career if they wanted, even the military. They were also seen as more of an equal in terms of marriage and property ownership. The elevated status for women most likely was due to their role in childbirth and subsequent rearing.

In other parts of the law, they were less equal. In cases of adultery, there were several distinctions that can be observed. First, if a wife was caught with another man by her husband, he had the right to kill her. The wife did not have this right if her husband was adulterous. Second, there is also a difference between married women and those who were single. Death was the typical punishment for committing adultery if a woman was married, whether it was by the husband when discovered in the act or by the king acting as chief justice after a trial. However, for single women, the same behavior was not considered a crime at all. The husband could also choose to divorce the wife if he decided to spare her life during the proceedings, or if he wanted to keep her, he would veil her to signify to the public that her status had been questioned due to the adultery.

Rape is another example of explicit discrimination. Location was an important factor in determining who was punished. The man would only be penalized if the crime took place outside of the home. If instead, it occurred within the household, then the women was deemed the guilty party and reprimanded. This was because her consent in that setting was assumed to be automatically given. Here, the man would only be punished if caught by the husband in the act.

Even though Hittite women did enjoy certain rights in society and the household, they were still highly patriarchal as well. The eldest man was still in charge of the household, even though his role was not absolute and more one of supervision. In addition, women were not consulted when decisions were being made about them, such as marriage arrangements.

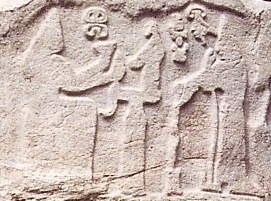
This is a depiction of the Hittite queen Puduhepa who due to a tradition of an independent and politically active queenship was able to have unprecedented influence in Hittite royal affairs.Creative Commons Attribution 3.0 Unported

In addition, there are a couple of depictions of women who were able to obtain powerful positions in Hittite society. One woman is a queen named Puduhepa who was able to have significant influence in courtly affairs. She was the most well known Hittite queen and considered by many to be among the most powerful women in the Ancient Near East. She was the daughter of a priest and wife of Hattusili III. He married her while on his way back from fighting in the Battle of Kadesh when he was told to stop by Ishtar. She was able to become queen when her husband took the Hittite throne. Of Hurrian origin, she was able to spread her culture as queen where it had an important effect on the Hittites. She also was a powerful ruler on her own. She participated actively in royal affairs and her influence in the state continued for a short while after the death of Hattusili.

This situation was not inconceivable for the Hittites who, unlike their Mesopotamian contemporaries, already conceived of the role of queen as relatively powerful and independent. This openness to queens who were political allowed Puduhepa to have so much influence. However, even by these standards she was uniquely involved. Scholars have attributed this ability to a combination of the prerequisite of treating queens with honor and Puduhepa's ability to exploit the closeness she had with Hattusili, along with her disposition. She also played a big part in the religious transformation that occurred during her time as queen. Her name appears several times in texts about omen dreams and she was the author of two important prayers.

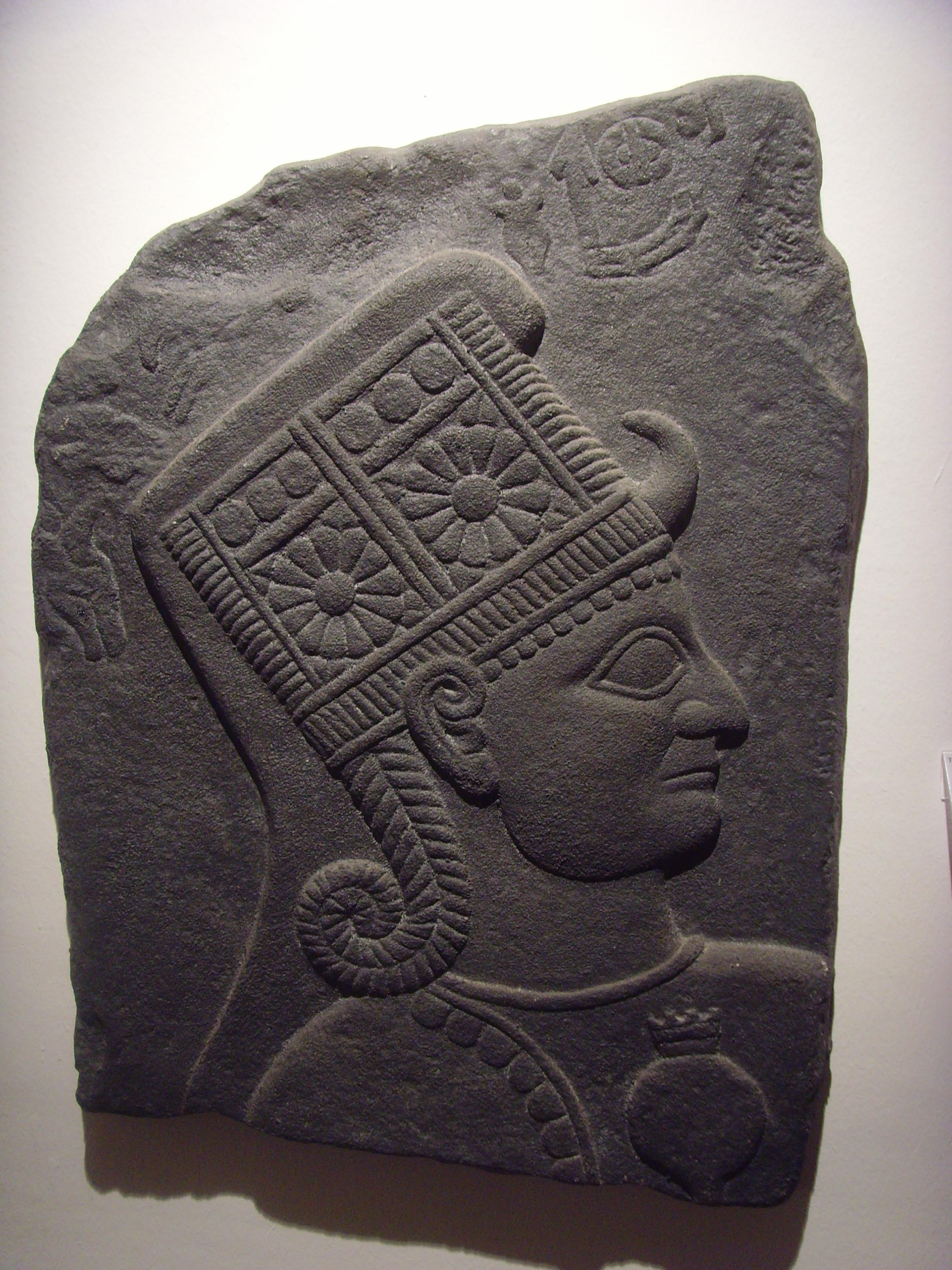
A relief from the Turkish and Islamic Arts Museum depicting Kubaba as a goddess who was worshipped by the Hittites.

Another example of the Hittites' acceptance of women holding significant power is Kubaba, who was a Mesopotamian queen who ruled in her own right during the Early Dynastic Period or Kish III. She is also the only female who is on the Sumerian King List. The Weidner Chronicle also positively mentions her as "obtaining sovereignty" from Marduk. Her name is mentioned favorably by scribes in omen texts, and much of her reign has been expanded to included a sizable portion of legend. The reason she is connected to the Hittites is because she was turned into a goddess they worshipped. In fact, she had a significant cult around her. The first evidence of her existence as a deity is from early 18th century BCE. She was also worshipped by other societies in the Near East, including the Phrygians and Assyrians. She was a mother-goddess who was often depicted by the Hittites in bird form.

== Athenian law ==
In ancient Athenian law, women lacked many of the legal rights given to their male counterparts. They were excluded from appearing in law courts or participating in the assembly. They were also legally prohibited from engaging in contracts worth any significant amount of money,

There was an expectation that respectable women should not appear – or even be talked about – in public. Historians doubt that this ideal could have been attained except by the richest women, however.

Women in Classical Athens did have the right to divorce, though they lost all rights to any children they had by their husband upon divorce.

== Roman law ==
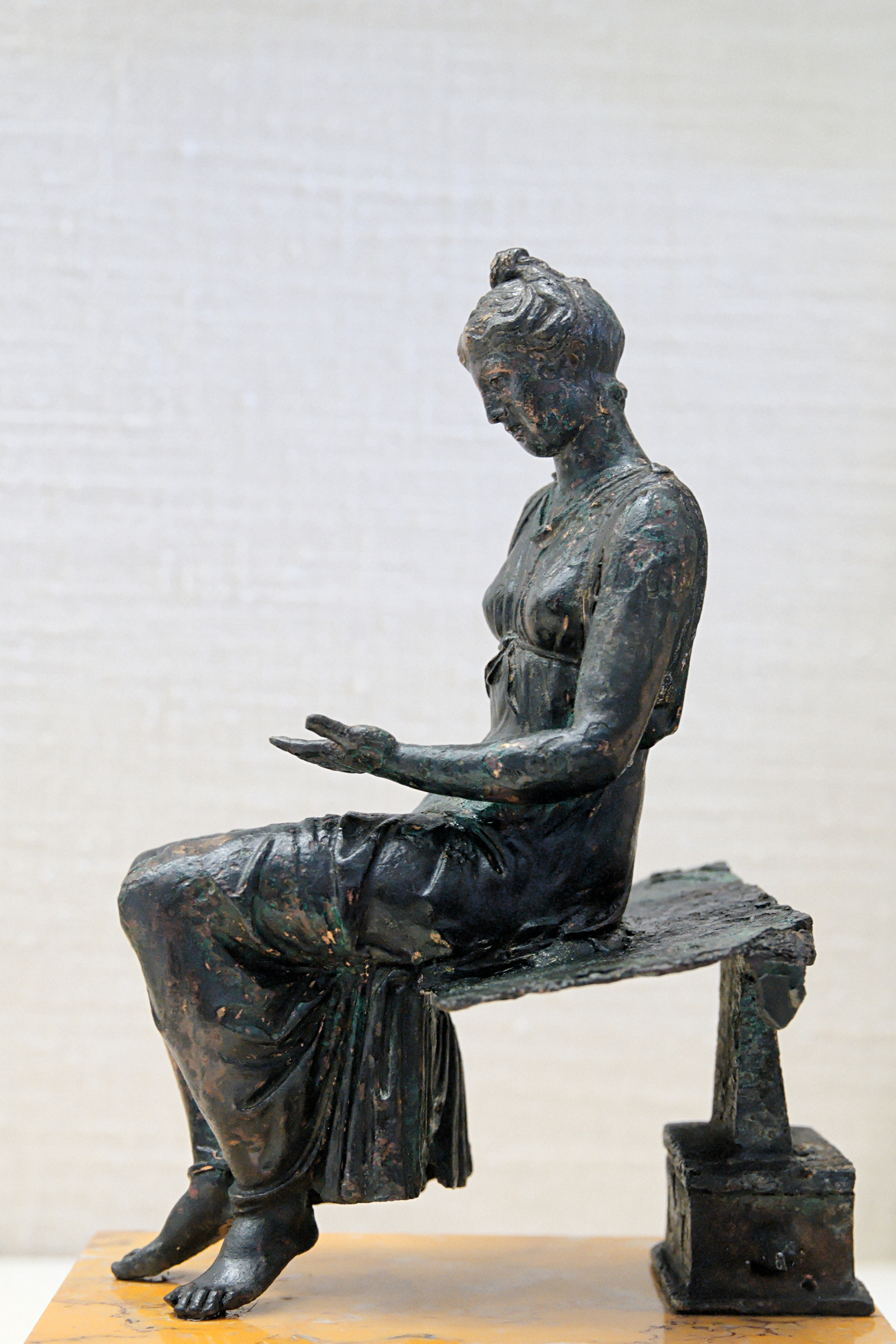
Bronze statuette of a young woman reading (latter 1st century)

The laws of ancient Rome law, like the laws of ancient Athens law, profoundly disfavored women. Roman citizenship was tiered, and women could hold a form of second-class citizenship with certain limited legal privileges and protections unavailable to non-citizens, freedmen, or slaves, but not on par with men. Roman society and law was sexist and extremely patriarchal, and the law prohibited women from voting, standing for public office, serving in most civic priesthoods or serving in any capacity in the Roman military.

In the Early Republic, women were always under the legal control of some man; her father, her husband, or her legal guardian (the tutela mulierum perpetua, usually a relative) who was required to provide his formal approval for certain of her legal acts, usually involving transfers of property. This was reformed somewhat under Augustus when he enacted laws to encourage larger families; a woman who had given birth to at least three named children was permitted to become sui luris (her own person, legally emancipated) in the event of divorce or the death of her husband, not subject to the tutela legal guardianship.

All children born of marriage were the exclusive possession of their father – they inherited his social status, name, and citizenship. In the event of divorce or the father's death, the children remained in the sole custody of the father or his family. Children born outside of marriage inherited the social status, name, and citizenship of their mother unless and until the father later legitimated them. In the Early Empire (1st–2nd Centuries CE), daughters had the same right as sons to inherit should a parent die intestate (without a will).

In the Early Republic, the legal control and property of a woman passed from her father to her husband, and she became subject to her husband (or his father's) potestas.

By the Late Republic, this sort of manus marriage was generally abandoned (except for patricians, because certain priesthoods were exclusively available to patricians born of a manus marriage) for the so-called "free marriage". In this more common form, the bride remained under her father's potestas, and her husband had limited legal power over her. To the extent a Roman woman in a free marriage lived beyond the daily supervision of her father, she enjoyed a higher degree of autonomy than most women in the ancient world. By the Late Republic divorce and remarriage was relatively common, though some felt it was virtuous to marry only once. When her father died, she became sui iuris (typically much earlier than a woman in a manus marriage). A father or husband could, through a provision in his will, allow his wife or daughter to select her own tutela, which would allow her to replace an uncooperative one. A mother's right to own property and to dispose of by making a will could provide her with a certain influence over her adult sons.

The property of a bride in a free marriage didn't convert to the ownership of her husband, it remained in the control of her father until he passed. By the Late Republic there were women who owned substantial property and controlled major businesses.

For a time, Roman women could argue as advocates in courts but a subsequent law prohibited them from representing the interests of others. Some women were known to be effective legal strategists.

Adultery was an illicit sex act (stuprum) determined entirely by the status of the woman. If a married woman had sex with any man besides her husband, she was guilty of adultery. However, if a married man had sex with a woman who was not or could not be legally married, there was no offense.

Roman law recognized rape as a crime in which the victim bore no guilt. Rape was a capital crime. As a matter of law, however, rape could be committed only against a citizen in good standing. There was no crime of marital rape, and the rape of a slave could be prosecuted only as damage to her owner's property. Most prostitutes in ancient Rome were slaves, though some slaves were protected from forced prostitution by a clause in their sales contract.

Working as a prostitute or entertainer made a woman subject to infamis, on the basis that by making her body publicly available, she had in effect surrendered her right to be protected from sexual abuse or physical violence.

== Byzantine law ==
Since Byzantine law was essentially based on Roman law, the legal status of women did not change significantly from the practices of the 6th century. But the traditional restriction of women in the public life as well as the hostility against independent women still continued. Greater influence of Greek culture contributed to strict attitudes about women's roles being domestic instead of being public. There was also a growing tendency for women who were not prostitutes, slaves or entertainers to be entirely veiled. Like previous Roman law, women could not be legal witnesses, hold administrations or run banking but they could still inherit properties and own land.

As a rule the influence of the church was exercised in favor of the abolition of the disabilities imposed by the older law upon celibacy and childlessness, of increased facilities for entering a professed religious life, and of due provision for the wife. The church also supported the political power of those who were friendly toward the clergy. The appointment of mothers and grandmothers as tutors was sanctioned by Justinian.

The restrictions on the marriage of senators and other men of high rank with women of low rank were extended by Constantine, but it was almost entirely removed by Justinian. Second marriages were discouraged, especially by making it legal to impose a condition that a widow's right to property should cease on remarriage, and the Leonine Constitutions at the end of the 9th century declared that third marriages were valid, but the spouse was subject to fines and provisions made by Church law. The same constitutions made the benediction of a priest a necessary part of the ceremony of marriage.

The criminal law also changed its perspectives on women. Adultery was punished with death by Constantine, but the penalty was reduced by Justinian to banishment to a convent. A woman condemned for adultery could not remarry. A marriage between a Christian and a Jew rendered the parties guilty of adultery.

Severe laws were enacted against offenses of unchastity, especially procurement and incest. It was a capital crime to carry off or offer violence to a nun. Women were subject to penalties for wearing dress or ornaments (except rings) imitating those reserved for the emperor and his family. Actresses and women of bad fame were not to wear the dress of virgins dedicated to Heaven. If a consul had a wife or mother living with him, he was allowed to incur greater expense than if he lived alone. The interests of working women were protected by enactments for the regulation of the gynoecia, or workshops for spinning, dyeing, etc.

The canon law, looking with disfavor on the female independence prevailing in the later Roman law, tended rather in the opposite direction. The chief differences between canon and Roman law were in the law of marriage, especially in the introduction of publicity and of the formalities of the ring. The benediction of a priest was made a necessary part of the ceremony, as indeed it had been made by the civil power, as has been already stated, in the post-Justinian period of Roman law.

== Islamic law ==
In the early Middle Ages, an early effort to improve the status of women occurred during the early reforms under Islam, when women were given greater rights in marriage, divorce, and inheritance. The Oxford Dictionary of Islam states that the general improvement of the status of Arab women included prohibition of female infanticide (though the prevalence of female infanticide in pre-Islamic Arabia is heavily disputed) and recognizing women's full personhood. "The dowry, previously regarded as a bride-price paid to the father, became a nuptial gift retained by the wife as part of her personal property." Under Islamic law, marriage was no longer viewed as a "status" but rather as a "contract", in which the woman's consent was imperative. Married women's property, including land, was held by them in their own names and did not become in any way, shape, or form, the property of their husbands by marriage, a major difference from laws in most of Europe until the modern era. "Women were given inheritance rights in a patriarchal society that had previously restricted inheritance to male relatives." Annemarie Schimmel states that "compared to the pre-Islamic position of women, Islamic legislation meant an enormous progress; the woman has the right, at least according to the letter of the law, to administer the wealth she has brought into the family or has earned by her own work." English Common Law transferred property held by a wife at the time of a marriage to her husband, which contrasted with the Sura: "Unto men (of the family) belongs a share of that which Parents and near kindred leave, and unto women a share of that which parents and near kindred leave, whether it be a little or much – a determinate share" (Qur'an 4:7), albeit maintaining that husbands were solely responsible for the maintenance and leadership of his wife and family.

=== Education ===
Islam made the education of women a sacred obligation Women, far from being barred from study of Islam's holy book, were urged to learn to read it as were men. Women in Islam played an important role in the foundations of many Islamic educational institutions, such as Fatima al-Fihri's founding of the University of Al Karaouine in 859. This continued through to the Ayyubid dynasty in the 12th and 13th centuries, when 160 mosques and madrasahs were established in Damascus, 26 of which were funded by women through the Waqf (charitable trust or trust law) system. Half of all the royal patrons for these institutions were also women. According to the Sunni scholar Ibn Asakir in the 12th century, there were opportunities for female education in the medieval Islamic world, writing that women could study, earn ijazahs (academic degrees), and qualify as scholars and teachers. This was especially the case for learned and scholarly families, who wanted to ensure the highest possible education for both their sons and daughters. Ibn Asakir had himself studied under 80 different female teachers in his time. Female education in the Islamic world was inspired by Muhammad's wives: Khadijah, a successful businesswoman, and Aisha, a renowned hadith scholar and military leader. According to a hadith attributed to Muhammad, he praised the women of Medina because of their desire for religious knowledge:

"How splendid were the women of the ansar; shame did not prevent them from becoming learned in the faith."

While it was not common for women to enroll as students in formal classes, it was common for women to attend informal lectures and study sessions at mosques, madrasahs and other public places. While there were no legal restrictions on female education, some men did not approve of this practice, such as Muhammad ibn al-Hajj (d. 1336) who was appalled at the behaviour of some women who informally audited lectures in his time:

"[Consider] what some women do when people gather with a shaykh to hear [the recitation of] books. At that point women come, too, to hear the readings; the men sit in one place, the women facing them. It even happens at such times that some of the women are carried away by the situation; one will stand up, and sit down, and shout in a loud voice. [Moreover,] her 'awra will appear; in her house, their exposure would be forbidden – how can it be allowed in a mosque, in the presence of men?"

=== Employment ===
Women under Islamic law could enter into contracts, buy and sell property, sue in court on their own behalf without the need for a man to represent them, engage in commerce, endow trusts, etc., the same as a man. The labor force in the Caliphate were employed from diverse ethnic and religious backgrounds, while both men and women were involved in diverse occupations and economic activities. Women were employed in a wide range of commercial activities and diverse occupations in the primary sector (as farmers for example), secondary sector (as construction workers, dyers, spinners, etc.) and tertiary sector (as investors, doctors, nurses, presidents of guilds, brokers, peddlers, lenders, scholars, etc.). Muslim women also held a monopoly over certain branches of the textile industry, the largest and most specialized and market-oriented industry at the time, in occupations such as spinning, dyeing, and embroidery. In comparison, female property rights and wage labour were relatively uncommon in Europe until the Industrial Revolution in the 18th and 19th centuries.

=== Criminal law ===
Female and male transgressors were treated mostly the same except some instance for example, diya or financial compensation for a crime against a female victim is half that of a male victim. A charge of adultery against a woman requires four eyewitnesses which made it difficult to prosecute. Rape, on the other hand, is a criminal assault offense which does not require four eyewitnesses as if it were a charge of adultery. However, several Muslim-majority countries have addressed rape under the rubric of adultery, requiring it to have four eyewitnesses; this has been the subject of international controversy. Women could serve as witnesses in court but her testimony worth half that of a man. As mentioned in the Quran "Call in to witness from among your men two witnesses; but if there are not two men, then one man and two women of such as you approve as witnesses, so that if one of the two (women) forgets, the other (woman) may remind her"

=== Marriage law ===
The Quran clearly allows polygamy up to 4 wives as mentioned: "And if you fear that you will not deal justly with the orphan girls, then marry those that please you of [other] women, two or three or four. But if you fear that you will not be just, then [marry only] one or those your right hand possesses. That is more suitable that you may not incline [to injustice]." The consent of the first wife before marrying another women is not needed in Islamic laws according to the Standing Committee of fatwa.

According to an opinion within the Hanbali school of thought, the father can give his underage daughter to marriage without her consent, as Ibn Qudamah (a Hanbali Muslim Scholar) states: "With regard to females, the father may give his minor, virgin daughter who has not yet reached the age of nine in marriage, and there is no difference of opinion concerning that, if he gives her in marriage to someone who is compatible. Ibn al-Mundhir said: All of those scholars from whom we acquired knowledge unanimously agreed that it is permissible for a father to give his minor daughter in marriage if he arranges her to someone who is compatible, and it is permissible for him to do that even if she is reluctant.

If the women reached mature age to have legal consent, her consent is needed in marriage, as the Prophet ordered:"A previously-married woman has more right concerning herself than her guardian, and the permission of a virgin should be sought (regarding marriage), and her permission is her silence". However, any women must be married by the consent of her guardian unless the marriage will be invalid if her guardian disagrees as the Prophet said:"There should be no nikaah (marriage contract) except with a wali (guardian)."

Although Muslim men can marry women of Jewish or Christian faith, women are forbidden to marry non-Muslim men.

== Northern and Western European laws ==
=== Scandinavia ===
Early laws in northern Europe varied greatly in how they treated women. In pagan Scandinavia before Christian missionaries, women had a relatively free and independent position. Christianity arrived with its first missionaries circa 800 AD, but was not dominant until circa 1000, and did not affect women's position much until circa 1200.

During the Viking Age, women had a relatively free status in the Nordic countries of Sweden, Denmark and Norway, illustrated in the Icelandic Grágás and the Norwegian Frostating laws and Gulating laws. The paternal aunt, paternal niece and paternal granddaughter, referred to as odalkvinna, all had the right to inherit property from a deceased man. In the absence of male relatives, an unmarried woman with no son could, further more, inherit not only property, but also the position as head of the family from a deceased father or brother: a woman with such status was referred to as ringkvinna, and she exercised all the rights afforded to the head of a family clan, such as for example the right to demand and receive fines for the slaughter of a family member, unless she married, by which her rights were transferred to her husband. After the age of 20, an unmarried woman, referred to as maer and mey, reached legal majority and had the right to decide of her place of residence and was regarded as her own person before the law. An exception to her independence was the right to choose a marriage partner, as marriages were normally arranged by the clan. Widows enjoyed the same independent status as unmarried women. Women had religious authority and were active as priestesses (gydja) and oracles (sejdkvinna); they were active within art as poets (skalder) and rune masters, and as merchants and medicine women. They may also have been active within military office: the stories about shieldmaidens are unconfirmed, but some archaeological finds such as the Birka female Viking warrior may indicate that at least some women in military authority existed. A married woman could divorce her husband and remarry. It was also socially acceptable for a free woman to cohabit with a man and have children with him without marrying him, even if that man was married: a woman in such a position was called frilla. There was no distinction made between children born inside or outside of marriage: both had the right to inherit property after their parents, and there was no "legitimate" or "illegitimate" children. These liberties gradually disappeared after the introductions of Christianity, and from the late 13th century, they are no longer mentioned. During the Christian Middle Ages, the Medieval Scandinavian law applied different laws depending on the local county law, signifying that the status of women could vary depending on which county she was living in.

Sweden was given its first attempt of a national code by the Magnus Erikssons landslag in 1350. In medieval Christian Sweden, properties owned by the wife was merged into her husband's household and transferred under his care. This was similar to other countries within Europe where property was female property forfeited to the male during their marriage. So all the properties of the wife was managed by the husband and could be freely alienated unless it was her kinsman's inheritance which was an exception. By law, both sons and daughters could inherit properties. Inheritance was equal in towns and cities, but in the countryside sons were entitled to twice as large of a share as daughters. The Swedish law protected women from their husbands by transferring some authority to their male relatives. A woman could not transfer her property to her husband without her family or kinsman's consent either.

Under the Civil Code of Christian V from 1683, the law of Denmark-Norway defined and unmarried female under the guardianship of her closest male relative regardless of her age, while a married woman was under the couverture of her husband. The same law terms was applied in Sweden (with Finland) in accordance with the Civil Code of 1734. Both the Civil Code of 1683 in the case of Denmark-Norway, and the Civil Code of 1734 in the case of Sweden (with Finland), remained in place more or less unaltered until the mid 19th century.

=== Ireland ===
Ancient Irish laws generally portray a patriarchal and patrilineal society in which the rules of inheritance were based on agnatic descent. The Brehon law excepted women from the ordinary course of the law. They could distrain or contract only in certain named cases, and distress upon their property was regulated by special rules. In general, every woman had to have a male guardian. Women seem not to have been entitled to the slightest possession of land under the Brehon law, but rather had assigned to them a certain number of their father's cattle as their marriage-portion.

However, their legal status was not as low as in some other cultures; and it seems that the status of Irish women improved somewhat with time, especially after the introduction of Christianity. For instance, beginning in the eighth century, female heirs inherited real estate if they had no brothers. These women became known as "heiresses" and, while only a small minority of women living at this time, they could exercise a considerable amount of political and legal influence. If an heiress married a landless husband, she was seen as his legal guardian, leading to a very unusual case of complete gender role reversal. However, most women did not own land and remained more or less dependent on their husbands; under the ancient Brehon laws one could not be counted as a free citizen unless one owned land independently. The holding of political offices, similarly, seems to have been only suitable for men; nowhere in Irish historical tracts is any female High Queen or chieftain mentioned, and warfare and political affairs were generally all-male.

However in the late 17th century there are numerous accounts in Burke's Peerage of women inheritimg noble estates and or men inheriting via female lines. These heiresses were English and increasingly more Irish families.

Even with these legal restrictions placed upon women, they retained some legal capacity. The arrival of St. Patrick and the introduction of Christian Roman law affected the medieval Irish view of marriage. By the eighth century, the preferred form of marriage was one between social equals, under which a woman was technically legally dependent on her husband and had half his honor price, but could exercise considerable authority in regard to the transfer of property. Such women were called "women of joint dominion". Adult sons appear to have gained rights under the new Christian laws as well, as surviving texts seem to indicate that sons could impugn bad contracts that would harm his inheritance. Daughters, however, continued to have little or no legal independence, although after the eighth century they could no longer be forced into marriage by their parents.

=== England ===
In about 60 AD, Boudica, a Celtic queen in East Anglia, led a nearly successful battle against the Roman Empire, seeking to preserve her daughters' rights to inherit, a right they held under pre-Roman systems, but which the Romans prohibited.

England has a complex history of legal rights for women. Significant documentations of women's rights occurred after the Norman conquest of England. These documentations reversed some laws the Conquest imposed in 1066, and caused divergence with Continental, Irish and other Holy Roman Empire laws. This divergence, where England gave more rights to women, became a factor in conflict with the French and other Holy Roman Empire monarchies for centuries, including the Hundred Years' War, the attempted invasion by the Spanish Armada and the War of Austrian succession.

These documentations included Magna Carta in 1215 and the 1689 Bill of Rights, which both gave rights to women that were prohibited in the Holy Roman Empire systems. Also, the reign of Elizabeth I from 1558 to 1603 was significant in its visible and successful assertion of rights of single women to inherit property, to earn money, to exercise agency, and otherwise function as legal actors equivalent to single or married men; these rights contrasted with Holy Roman Empire legal constraints on women and were a significant factor in The English Reformation and English Midlands Enlightenment. These rights continued to be suspended for many married women, however, who in many regions of England remained under legal disability during marriage under common laws of Coverture that traced from the Norman Conquest.

England was one of the first places in the world to grant voting rights to women citizens universally and regardless of marital status, which it did by passage of the 1918 Representation of the People Act that gave voting rights to women aged 30 years and over who met a property qualification (equal voting rights with men was achieved a decade later under the Equal Franchise Act 1928, which permitted all women aged 21 and over to vote). Several centuries earlier, some of its colonies in North America, including New Jersey Colony by its constitution, had granted voting rights to women who could meet the same property requirements men had to meet; common laws of Coverture requiring a married woman's property to be held by her husband meant married women typically could not qualify.

Prior to the Norman Conquest in 1066, the laws varied by the separate regions in England.

The laws of Athelstan contained a peculiarly brutal provision for the punishment of a female slave convicted of theft: She was to be burned alive by eighty other female slaves.^{[Is this different than the treatment a male slave would have received?]} >Other laws were directed against the practice of witchcraft by women. Burning was the punishment specially appropriated to women convicted of treason or witchcraft. A case of sentence to execution by burning for treason occurred as late as 1789. ^{[Again, is this treatment different for women than for men convicted of treason?]}

Monogamy was enforced both by the civil and ecclesiastical law ^{[for women? for men? in what time period and region?]}. Second and third marriages involved penance. A glimpse of cruelty in the household is afforded by the provision, occurring no less than three times in the ecclesiastical legislation, that if a woman scourged her female slave to death, she must do penance.

Traces of wife-purchase were still seen in the law of Æthelberht of Kent, which stated that if a man carried off a freeman's wife, he must, at his own expense, procure another wife for the husband. (See also bride kidnapping.) The codes contain few provisions as to the property of married women, but those few appear to prove that they were in a better position than at later dates.

The development of the bride price no doubt was in the same direction. It was the sum paid by the husband to the wife's family for the purchase of part of the family property, while the morning-gift was paid to the bride herself. In its English form, morning-gift occurs in the laws of Canute; in its Latinized form of morgangiva, it occurs in the Leges Henrici Primi.

The old common and statute law of England placed women in a special position. A woman was exempt from legal duties more particularly attaching to men and not performable by a deputy. She could not hold a proper feud, i.e., one of which the tenure was by military service. The same principle appears in the rule that she could not be endowed of a castle maintained for the defense of the realm and not for the private use of the owner. She could receive homage, but not render it in the form used by men.

She could be the constable, either of a castle or a vill, but not the sheriff, except in the one case of Westmorland, where an hereditary office was exercised in the 17th century by Anne, countess of Dorset, Pembroke and Montgomery.

In certain cases a woman could transmit rights that she could not enjoy. Edward III's claim to the crown of France rested on such a power of transmission. However, the claim was a breach of the French constitutional law, which rejected the claim of a woman.

By Magna Carta, widow's rights to property were protected, in sharp contrast to the Salic law, but a woman could not accuse a man of murder except of that of her husband. This disability no doubt arose from the fact that in trial by battle she naturally did not appear in person but through a champion.

In some old statutes, very curious sumptuary regulations as to women's dress occur. By the sumptuary laws of Edward III in 1363 (37 Edw. III, cc. 8–14), women were, in general, to be dressed according to the position of their fathers or husbands. At the times of passing these sumptuary laws, the trade interests of women were protected by the legislature.

In some cases, the wives and daughters of tradesmen were allowed to assist in the trades of their husbands and fathers. Some trading corporations, such as the East India Company, recognized no distinction of sex in their members.

At common law a woman could own both real and personal property. However, in the case of a married woman the husband had a life interest in any real property: this continued even after the wife's death, and was known as tenancy "by the curtesy". Personal property passed into the ownership of the husband absolutely, with the exception of certain items of adornment or household use known as paraphernalia. Upon marriage, all of the wife's property becomes under the hands of her husband even if it was her family inheritance. Any money the wife earned through labour or trade also ended up in the hands of her husband whom she was expected to obey in the custom of marriage at the time.

Domestic violence was also tolerated in historical England as long as it did not disturb public peace. A husband or master is legally entitled to beat and restrain his wife, child or servant as long as he did not kill them and disturb public peace. Husbands were also entitled to unrestricted access to his wife's body until the late 20th century where the concept of marital rape was recognized and criminalized.

=== Scotland ===
In Scotland, as early as Regiam Majestatem (14th century), women were the object of special legal regulation. In that work, the mercheta mulieris (probably a tax paid to the lord on the marriage of his tenant's daughter) was fixed at a sum differing according to the rank of the woman. Numerous ancient laws dealt with trade and sumptuary matters. It still survives on the island of Ulva. By the Leges Quatuor Burgorum, female brewsters making bad ale were to forfeit eightpence and be put on the cucking-stool, and were to set an ale-wand outside their houses under a penalty of fourpence. The same laws also provided that a married woman committing a trespass without her husband's knowledge might be chastised like an under-age child.

=== Wales ===
The second part of the Welsh Law Codes begins with "the laws of women", such as the rules governing marriage and the division of property if a married couple should separate. The position of women under Welsh law differed significantly from that of their Norman-English contemporaries. A marriage could be established in two basic ways. The normal way was that the woman would be given to a man by her kindred; the abnormal way was that the woman could elope with a man without the consent of her kindred. In the latter case, her kindred could compel her to return if she was still a virgin, but if she was not, she could not be compelled to return. If the relationship lasted for seven years, she had the same entitlements as if she had been given by her kin.

A number of payments are connected with marriage. Amobr was a fee payable to the woman's lord on the loss of her virginity, whether on marriage or otherwise. Cowyll was a payment due to the woman from her husband on the morning after the marriage, marking her transition from virgin to married woman. Agweddi was the amount of the common pool of property owned by the couple that was due to the woman if the couple separated before the end of seven years. The total of the agweddi depended on the woman's status by birth, regardless of the actual size of the common pool of property. If the marriage broke up after the end of seven years, the woman was entitled to half the common pool.

If a woman found her husband with another woman, she was entitled to a payment of six score pence the first time and a pound the second time; on the third occasion she was entitled to divorce him. If the husband had a concubine, the wife was allowed to strike her without having to pay any compensation, even if it resulted in the concubine's death. A woman could only be beaten by her husband for three things: for giving away something that she was not entitled to give away, for being found with another man, or for wishing a blemish on her husband's beard. If he beat her for any other cause, she was entitled to the payment of sarhad. If the husband found her with another man and beat her, he was not entitled to any further compensation. Women were not allowed to inherit land, except under special circumstances, but the rule for the division of moveable property when one of a married couple died was the same for both sexes. The property was divided into two equal halves, with the surviving partner keeping one half and the dying partner being free to give bequests from the other half.

=== Edwardian Era laws ===
In 1911, under English law, the earliest age at which a girl could contract a valid marriage was 12; boys had to be 14. Under the lnfants Settlement Act 1855, a valid settlement could be made by a woman at 17 with the approval of the court, while the age for a man was 20; by the Married Women's Property Act 1907, any settlement by a husband of his wife's property was not valid unless executed by her if she was of full age, or confirmed by her after she attained full age.

An unmarried woman was liable for the support of illegitimate children till they attain the age of 16. She was generally assisted, in the absence of agreement, by an affiliation order granted by magistrates. A married woman having separate property was, under the Married Women's Property Acts 1882 and 1908, liable for the support of her parents, husband, children and grandchildren becoming chargeable to any union or parish.

In common law, the father, rather than the mother, was entitled to the custody of a legitimate child up to the age of 16, and could only forfeit such right by misconduct. But the Court of Chancery, wherever there was trust property and the infant could be made a ward of court, took a less rigid view of the paternal rights and looked more to the interest of the child, and consequently in some cases to the extension of the mother's rights in common law.

Legislation tended in the same direction. By the Custody of Infants Act 1873, the Court of Chancery was empowered to enforce a provision in a separation deed, giving up the custody or control of a child to the mother. The Judicature Act 1873 enacted that, in questions relating to the custody and education of infants, the rules of equity should prevail.

Historically significant disabilities under which women were still placed in 1910 were the exclusion of female heirs from succession to real estate, except in the absence of a male heir; and the fact that a husband could obtain a divorce for the adultery of his wife, while a wife could obtain it only for her husband's adultery if coupled with some other cause, such as cruelty or desertion.

Nearly all existing disabilities were lifted by the Sex Disqualification (Removal) Act 1919.

=== Spain and Aquitaine ===
Until the imposition of the Salic Law in the 1500s, in Spain and Southern France, those regions part of the Visigothic Kingdom (418–721) and its various successor states (Asturias, León, Castile, Navarre, Aragon, Aquitaine (Occitania) and Languedoc) Visigothic Law and Roman Law combined to allow women some rights. Particularly with the Liber Judiciorum as codified 642/643 and expanded on in the Code of Recceswinth in 653, women could inherit land and title and manage it independently from their husbands or male relations, dispose of their property in legal wills if they had no heirs, and women could represent themselves and bear witness in court by age 14 and arrange for their own marriages by age 20. In Spain these laws were further codified between 1252–1284 by Alfonso X of Castile with the Siete Partidas.

These laws would later be reversed by imposition of the Salic Law to prohibit women inheriting property. For example, the Salic law was imposed to prohibit the daughters of Isabella I of Castile from inheriting in Aragon. Today the Spanish throne is inherited by Male-preference cognatic primogeniture.

== Indian law ==
For the majority of history, Indians used their Hindu legal code as a basis for their rights and customs. Hindu legal code is based on the religious texts known as the dharmasatras. One of the dharmasatras was the Manu Smriti which although codified by the British authorities, was not believed to have at any time been used as a law code and was instead one of many competing dharmasatras. in ancient and medieval India though it may have acted as a theoretical resource during that time. Manu Smriti protected women's property rights as well as rights to inheritance. But it is also insisted that women is placed under a male guardianship at all times such as father from birth, husband in marriage and sons as a widow. Aside from property rights, the Hindu legal code did not grant women too many rights, but interpretation of the code was very fluid, depending on the local customs. Judgement and interpretation of the code was executed by local councils called the panchayats which composed of mostly male village elders but women were not always excluded. This local system fared women better than the normative Hindu code but this was reversed during colonial Anglo-Indian judiciary.

The colonial takeover by the British during the 17th and 18th century had more negative than positive effects on women's rights in the Indian subcontinent. Although they managed to outlaw widow burning, female infanticide and improve age of consent, scholars agree that overall women's legal rights and freedoms were restricted during this period. The British abolished local custom laws in favor of separate religious codes for Hindus and Muslims which had harsher treatment of women. These religious codes led to women having less rights when it came to landholding, inheritance, divorce, marriage and maintenance.

== See also ==
- Committee on Women's Rights and Gender Equality
- Compulsory sterilization
- Convention on the Elimination of All Forms of Discrimination Against Women (CEDAW)
- Equal Rights Amendment (ERA)
- In Defense of Women
- League of Women Voters
- Married Women's Property Acts in the United States
- Parental leave
- Reproductive rights – issues regarding "reproductive freedom"
- Subjection of women
- Sterilization law in the United States
- Timeline of reproductive rights legislation
- Timeline of women's legal rights in the United States (other than voting)
- Timeline of women's legal rights (other than voting)
- Vindication of the Rights of Woman
- Women's property rights
- Women's right to know
- Women's suffrage

== Cited sources ==
- Frier, Bruce W.; McGinn, Thomas A. (2004). A Casebook on Roman Family Law. Oxford University Press. ISBN 978-0-19-516185-4.
- Gardner, Jane F. (1991). Women in Roman Law and Society. Indiana University Press.
- McGinn, Thomas A.J. (1998). Prostitution, Sexuality and the Law in Ancient Rome. Oxford University Press.
- Shatzmiller, Maya (1994). Labour in the Medieval Islamic World. Brill. ISBN 978-90-04-09896-1.
