= Valkyrie from Hårby =

Viking age figurine

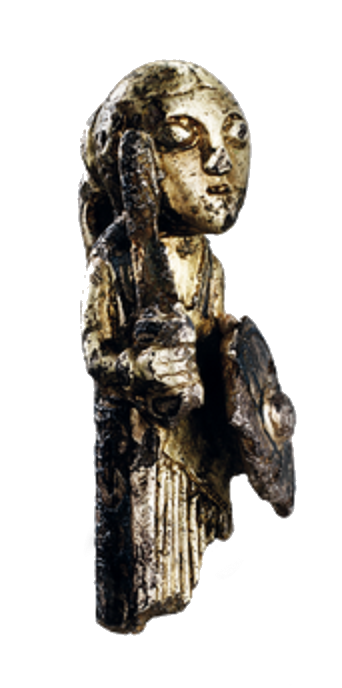
The Hårby figurine

The Valkyrie from Hårby is a small figurine found near the village of Hårby on the island of Funen in Denmark. The figurine is 3.4 centimetres (1.3 in) tall and made of gilded silver, and parts are coloured with niello to make them appear black. It was found in by an amateur archaeologist in 2012. The figurine represents a woman clad in a long patterned skirt. Her eyes are very clearly delineated and her hair is tied at the back of her neck. In her right hand she holds a sword, in her left a round shield with a salient shield boss.

The figure matches similar figures which have been dated to 800 AD, and so it is assumed that this figure dates to the same period during the Viking Age. It is thought to represent a valkyrie, who in Norse mythology brought fallen warriors to Valhalla. Other possibilities are a Norse shield maiden, the Norse goddess Freya, or possibly even a mythological giantess.

A small number of other pieces of jewellery representing valkyries have been found, dating to the 9th century, but this one is unique in being three-dimensional.

Many finds have been made in Hårby from the Iron Age and the beginning of the Viking Age, including a gold rod, silver coins and bronze ornaments. Excavation has revealed several pit-houses in the area that served as workshops. Many old pieces of ornaments have been found that were to be reforged into new ones. The valkyrie is assumed to have been made in one of these workshops.

The Valkyrie from Hårby is included in an exhibit on the Vikings at the National Museum of Denmark.

Morten Skovsby created a replica sculpture in wood, 2 metres (6 ft 7 in) high and weighing 300–400 kg (660–880 lb), which was put on display in Assens in 2015.
