= Princess of Öland =

Princess of Öland (Swedish: Furstinnan av Öland) was a name given to the woman found buried in a boat grave at Klinta in Köpingsvik on Öland, Sweden, during the 10th century. The woman found buried in the grave is assumed to have been a local elite woman, an aristocrat with a both religious and secular power position. The grave was escavated in the 1950s and is regarded as a significant archeological find.

== The grave ==
The burial ground was escavated in the 1950s at Klinta, next to the trading post of Köpingsvik on Öland. The burial pyre was on the border between the cultivated land and the open fields. The remains was of a cremated woman, dated to the 10th century, who was laid upon a bear skin inside a boat. The remains of horses, cattle, pigs, dogs and cats were included as grave goods. Also remains of food was found as grave goods, such as rowan berries and hazelnuts.

After the funeral pyre had burned out, a grave was dug in the black earth where the remains of the funeral pyre stood. The grave was 45 centimeters in diameter, and about the same depth. The woman's remains were collected in a ceramic vessel, that was placed at the bottom of the grave next to the body of a slaughtered hen, and the excavated earth was placed around it in a ring. The grave was filled with grave goods: jewelry, 150 carnelian beads, rock crystal, glass, glass mass, an oriental bronze jug, a metal dish from Western Europe, coins, woodworking tools, horse equipment, a battle axe, several knives; there were also four hammers symbolic of Thor, a silver pendant depicting a kneeling man with bird figures on his shoulders, a copper plate with a short runic inscription that has been interpreted as a magic formula, and an iron key.

The grave was filled back up with earth and ashes from the funeral pyre, and a 70-centimeter-long metal pole was placed on top. The pole, which became known as the klintastavn (Klinta Staf), is decorated with animal heads and a model of a hall building on its top. The pole has been interpreted as a ceremonial pole used in the pre-Christian cult, the norse religion, but also, perhaps simultaneously, as a rank symbol, illustrating the woman's high position, that is; the ceremonial staff of a völva-priestess, as well as the scepter of a ruling aristocrat.

The woman is believed to have been a high-born aristocrat and a völva-priestess, probably the head of a powerful local clan on Öland. While Sweden were united under one king in the 10th century, the actual power belonged to local aristocratic chiefs, who ruled their local areas as principalities, and the head of these local clans often acted as religious leaders for the surrounding population. The woman in the grave would therefore plausibly have both a religious as well as a secular leadership role locally.

The grave was then sealed with a hexagonal clay lid, which covered the grave, except for the top of the pole with the hall building. The remaining earth and ashes from the funeral pyre then placed on top of this mound. This earth contained a number of grave goods: jewelry, an Islamic silver coin, 33 beads of rock crystal, carnelian and glass, plates and pieces of metal; a glass polishing stone, hazelnut shells, boat rivets, and fifteen liters of cremated animal bones. These are believed to have come with the funeral pyre, rather than been placed there intentionally.

== Male burial ==
The remains of a male was also found in the funeral pyre. It is unknown whether he died of natural causes, or whether he was a slave sacrificed during the funeral, to follow her in death. It is possible that the man's bones were separated from the woman's after the funeral pyre, and buried in a separate grave; it is also possible that his burial was completely separate from the woman's.

== Context ==
This grave was escavated in the 1950s and is considered to be the contemporary grave that is equipped in a more elbourate way than perhaps anyone found in Sweden at the time, but since the results of the escavation was nut published publicly at the time, it has not been given much attention. The Köpingsvik area has several equipped graves for women, including another from the 10th century that also appears to have been a boat grave and contained riding equipment, a tors hammer, beadwork, fittings and rivets.

== See also ==
- Baugrygr, Viking heiresses who were allowed to take over the role of head of the family and tasks normally performed by men.
- Birka grave Bj 581
- Oseberg ship
- Åsa Haraldsdottir of Agder
