= Shield-maiden =

Female warrior in Norse folklore and mythology

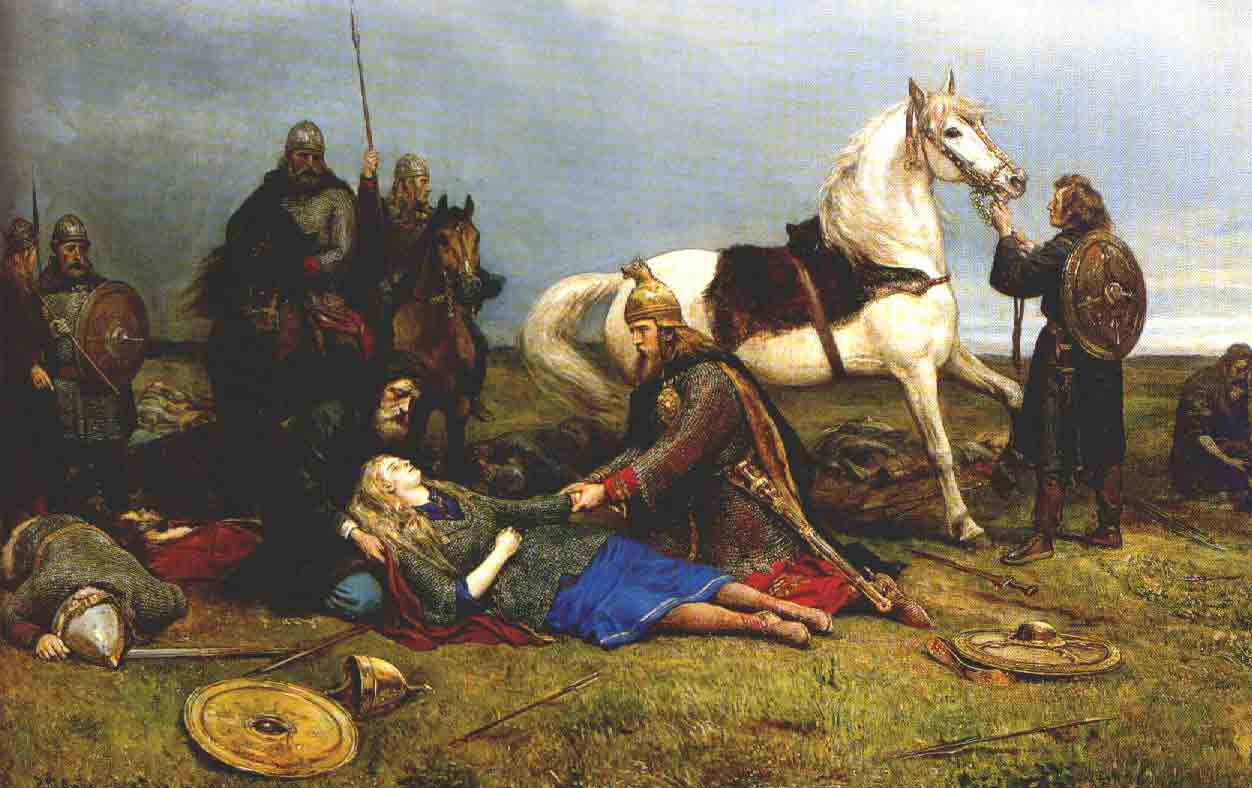
Hervor dying after the Hlǫðskviða by Peter Nicolai Arbo

A shield-maiden (Old Norse: skjaldmær [ˈskjɑldˌmæːr]) was a female warrior from Nordic folklore and Norse mythology.

The term skjaldmær most often shows up in legendary sagas such as Hervarar saga ok Heiðreks. However, female warriors are also mentioned in the Latin work Gesta Danorum. Both the legendary sagas and Gesta Danorum were written after the Viking Age and are considered fictional. Earlier reports of fighting women occur in some Roman sources from late antiquity. They are often associated with the mythical Valkyries, which may have inspired the shield-maidens. They may have also been inspired by accounts of Amazons.

== Etymology and meaning ==
The term "shield-maiden" is a calque of skjaldmær. Since Old Norse has no word that directly translates to warrior, but rather drengr, rekkr, and seggr can all refer to male warriors, and bragnar can mean warriors, it is problematic to say that the term meant female warrior to Old Norse speakers. Judith Jesch researched the word in an attempt to find its origin. While she found that it was used to describe Amazons as well as women warriors in the sagas, typically from the East, she found no conclusive evidence that it dates to the Viking Age, and suggests that it may have entered Old Norse in the 13th century. Additionally, the term is found in the name of a ship and the nickname of a poet.

In modern English, it can refer to a generic female warrior, but is also used to refer specifically to a type of character that appears in legendary sagas. Confusingly, it is sometimes used to refer to hypothetical female warriors in the Viking Age. Jesch argues against this usage in academic works to avoid confusion between textual and literal shield-maidens. The term is also used in modern English as a synonym for 'valkyrie'. Indeed, Brynhildr, a valkyrie, describes herself as a shield-maiden in the Vǫlsunga saga. However, the text was composed in the 13th century, and not in the Viking Age. In the Viking Age, valkyries served drinks in Valhalla and chose the dead in battle, but were not warriors in the same way as shield-maidens in the sagas.

== Shield-maidens in literature ==
Examples of shield-maidens mentioned by name in the Norse sagas include Brynhildr of the Vǫlsunga saga, Hervor in Hervarar saga ok Heiðreks, Brynhildr of the Bósa saga ok Herrauðs, and the Swedish princess Thornbjǫrg in Hrólfs saga Gautrekssonar. Princess Hed, Visna, Lagertha and Veborg are female warriors named in Gesta Danorum.

Two shield-maidens appear in Hervarar saga. The first of these Hervors was known to have taken up typically masculine roles early in her childhood and often raided travelers in the woods dressed as a man. Later in her life, she claimed the cursed sword Tyrfing from her father's burial site and became a seafaring raider. She eventually settled and married. Her granddaughter was also named Hervor and commanded forces against attacking Huns. Although the saga remarks on her bravery she is mortally wounded by enemy forces and dies on the battlefield.

Saxo Grammaticus reported that women fought on the side of the Danes at the Battle of Brávellir in the year 750:

Now out of the town of Sle, under the captains Hetha (Heid) and Wisna, with Hakon Cut-cheek came Tummi the Sailmaker. On these captains, who had the bodies of women, nature bestowed the souls of men. Webiorg was also inspired with the same spirit, and was attended by Bo (Bui) Bramason and Brat the Jute, thirsting for war.

Scholars Judith Jesch and Jenny Jochens speculate that shield-maidens' often grim fates or their sudden return to typically female roles is a testament to their role as figures of both male and female fantasy as well as emblematic of the danger of abandoning gender roles.

== Brynhildr Buðladóttir and Guðrún Gjúkadóttir ==
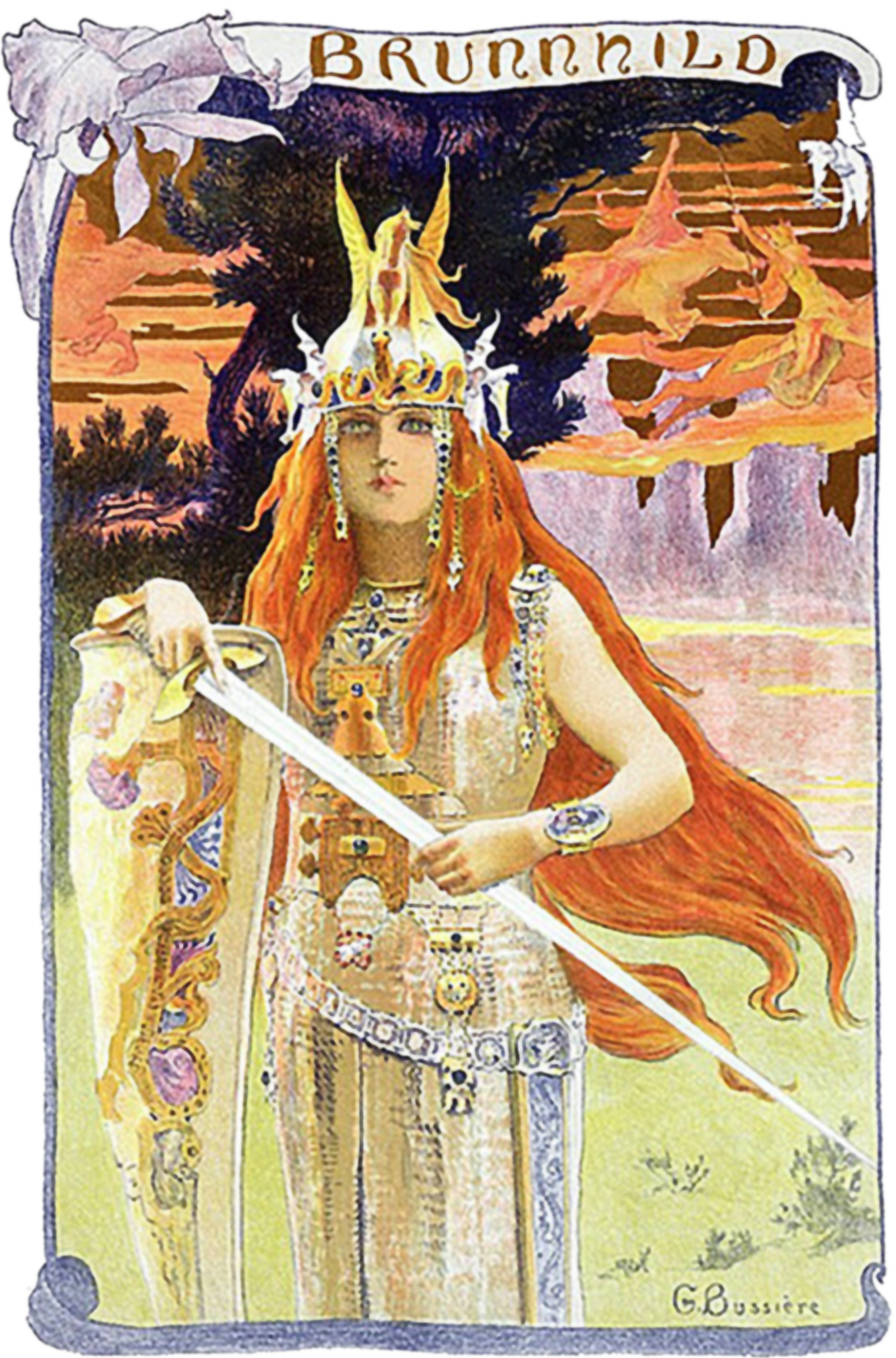
"Brunnhild" (1897) by Gaston Bussière

Brynhildr of the Vǫlsunga saga, along with her rival in love, Guðrún Gjúkadóttir, provides an example of how a shield-maiden compares to more conventional aristocratic womanhood in the sagas. Brynhildr is chiefly concerned with honour, much like a male warrior. When she ends up married to Guðrún's brother Gunnarr instead of Sigurðr, the man she intended to marry, Brynhildr speaks a verse comparing the courage of the two men:

Sigurd fought the dragon
And that afterward will be
Forgotten by no one
While men still live.
Yet your brother
Neither dared
To ride into the fire
Nor to leap across it.

Brynhildr is married to Gunnarr and not Sigurðr because of deceit and trickery, including a potion of forgetfulness given to Sigurðr so he forgets his previous relationship with her. Brynhildr is upset not only for the loss of Sigurðr, but also for the dishonesty involved. Similar to her male counterparts, the shield-maiden prefers to do things straightforwardly, without the deception considered stereotypically feminine in much of medieval literature. She enacts her vengeance directly, resulting in the deaths of herself, Sigurðr, and Sigurð's son by Guðrún. By killing the child, she demonstrates an understanding of feud and filial responsibility; if he lived, the boy would grow up to take vengeance on Brynhildr's family.

Guðrún shares a similar concern about family ties, but typically does not act on it immediately. She is more inclined to incite her male relatives to action than take up arms herself. Guðrún is no shield-maiden, and Brynhildr mocks her for this, saying, "Only ask what is best for you to know. That is suitable for noble women. And it is easy to be satisfied while everything happens according to your desires." In her later marriages, however, she is willing to kill her children, burn down a hall, and send her other sons to avenge the murder of her daughter, Svanhildr. In the world of the sagas, women can be both honorable and remorseless, much like the male heroes.

== Historical existence ==
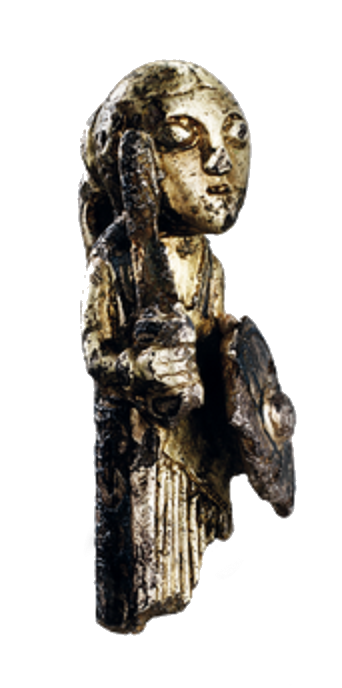
The Valkyrie from Hårby

Much of the study of shield-maidens focuses on them as a literary phenomenon. However, literary shield-maidens have long been seen by some as evidence of historical female warriors in the Viking Age. In the early 1900s a female weapon grave was found in Nordre Kjølen and labeled a shield-maiden. Shield-maidens however were not studied in depth until textual scholars began to examine the issue. Præstgaard Andersen, Jesch and Jochens all began to examine the textual sources. Neil Price, argues that they existed. Some scholars, such as professor Judith Jesch, have cited a lack of evidence for trained or regular female warriors.

=== Archaeology ===
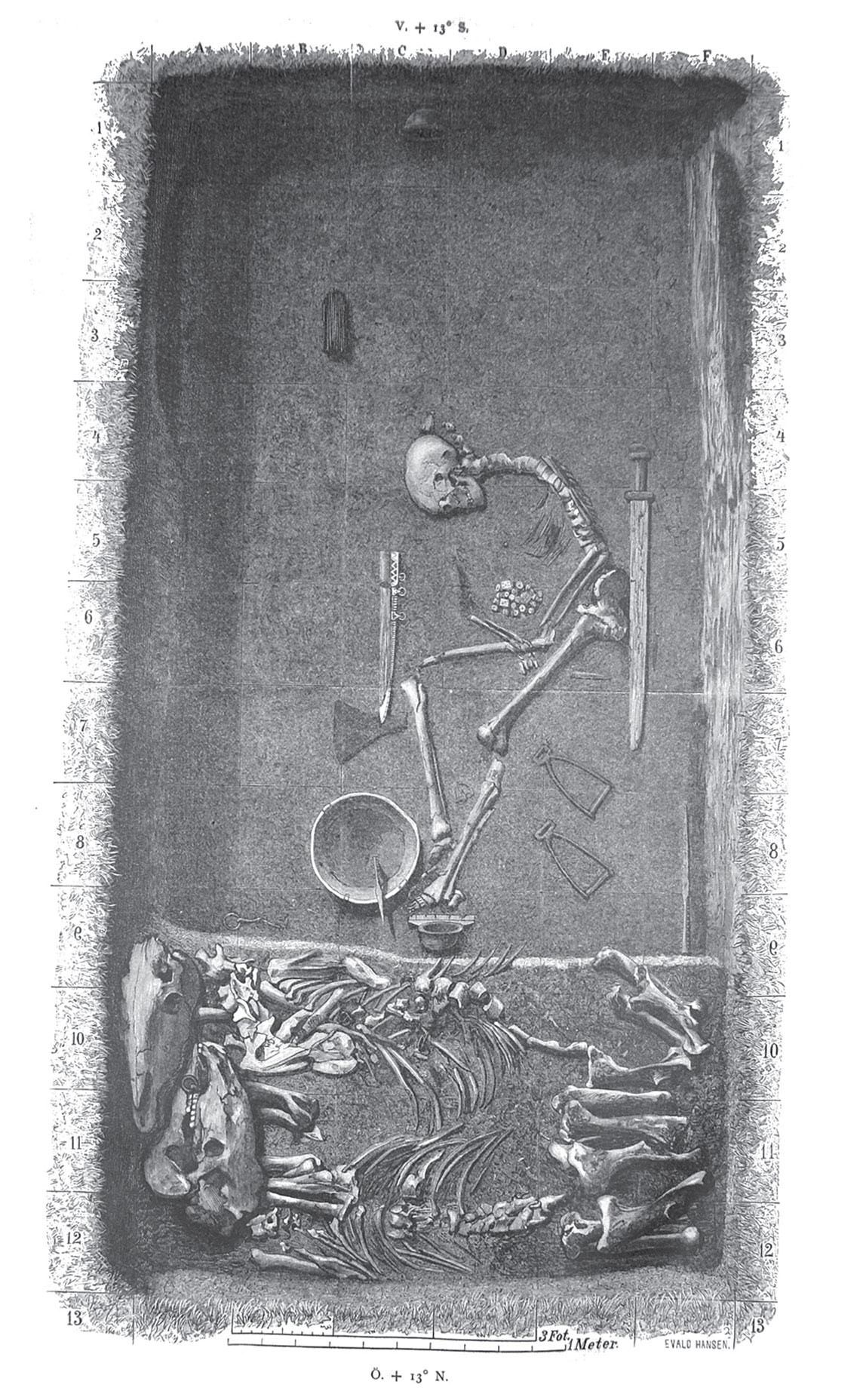
Sketch of Birka grave Bj 581 in Sweden, published 1889.

Graves of female settlers containing weapons have been uncovered, but scholars do not agree how these should be interpreted. Graves in England and chemical analysis of the remains from the period of Viking activity in the British Isles suggested a somewhat equal distribution of men and women, suggesting husbands took wives, while some of the women were under the burial.

In a tie-in special to the TV series Vikings, Neil Price showed that a 10th-century Birka grave Bj 581, excavated in the 1870s in Birka and containing many weapons and the bones of two horses, turned out to be the grave of a woman upon bone analysis by Anna Kjellström. In 2017, DNA analysis confirmed that the person was female, the so-called "Birka female Viking warrior".

=== Historical accounts ===
Roman sources occasionally mention women fighting among the Germanic peoples they faced; however, such reports are rare, and Hermann Reichert writes that fighting women were probably exceptional, uncommon cases rather than the norm.

There are historical attestations that Viking Age women took part in warfare. The Byzantine historian John Skylitzes records that women fought in battle when Sviatoslav I of Kiev attacked the Byzantines in Bulgaria in 971. When the Varangians (not to be confused with the Byzantine Varangian Guard) had suffered a defeat in the Siege of Dorostolon, the victors were stunned to discover armed women among the fallen warriors.

When Leif Erikson's pregnant half-sister Freydís Eiríksdóttir was in Vinland, she is reported to have taken up a sword and, bare-breasted, scared away the attacking Skrælings. The fight is recounted in the Greenland saga, which does not explicitly refer to Freydís as a shield-maiden.

== In popular culture ==
Female warriors inspired by the Norse sagas are portrayed in numerous works of historical and fantasy fiction, including prominently in such works as the 2013 TV series Vikings. The show depicts Lagertha (played by Katheryn Winnick) as the greatest shield-maiden in the world. In the TV show Beforeigners Alfhildr Enginnsdottir (played by Krista Kosonen) and Urd (played by Ágústa Eva Erlendsdóttir) are shield-maidens, who fought alongside Thorir Hund against Olaf II of Norway. Alfhildr later came to modern day Norway through a time hole and now works as a police inspector.

Explaining the inclusion of a female Viking warrior protagonist in the video game Assassin's Creed Valhalla, the game's historical advisor Thierry Noël said, "The archaeological sources are highly debated on that specific issue. But (...) it was part of [the Norse] conception of the world. Sagas and myths from Norse society are full of tough female characters and warriors. It was part of their idea of the world, that women and men are equally formidable in battle". The game's main character can be a male or female (choice of gender at game start) named Eivor Varinsson/Varinsdottir who is the leader of the Raven Clan alongside their adoptive brother Sigurd Styrbjornsson. However, canonically the character is female and known as Eivor Varinsdottir, a shield-maiden. A shield-maiden is depicted in the 2022 film The Northman.

While female warriors are a staple of fantasy fiction, they are not often referred to as shield-maidens. Some who are include Éowyn in J. R. R. Tolkien's The Lord of the Rings and Thorgil in Nancy Farmer's The Sea of Trolls trilogy.

== See also ==
- Women in ancient warfare
- Women in post-classical warfare
- Women in warfare (1500–1699)
- Women warriors in literature and culture
- List of women warriors in folklore
