= Birka grave Bj 581 =

Viking warrior burial, Birka, Sweden

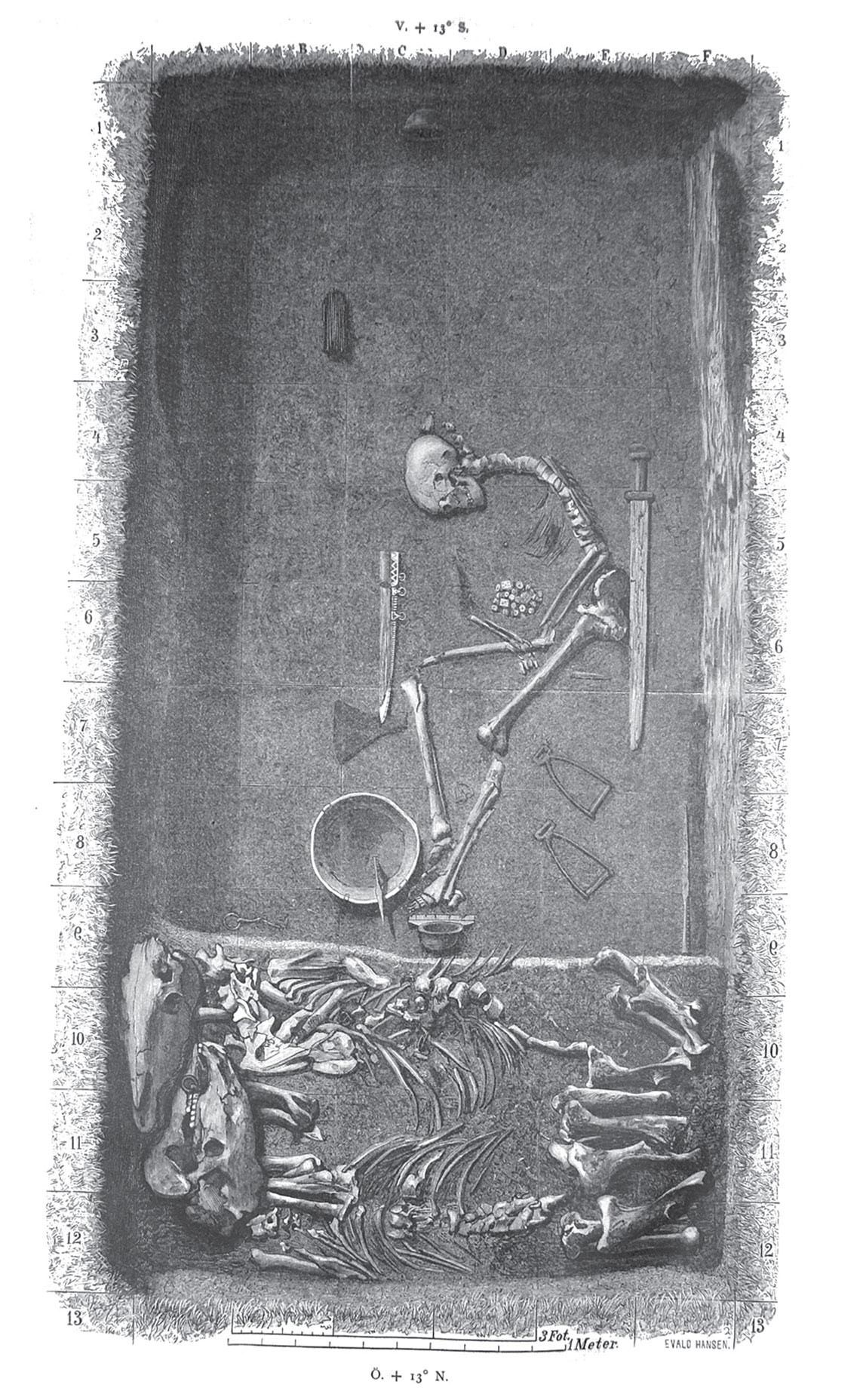
Sketch of archaeological grave found and labelled "Bj 581" in Birka, Sweden, published 1889.

Birka grave Bj 581 held remains confirmed to be of a Norse female, who was buried with two horses, an arsenal of weapons, and other elite grave goods during the 10th century in Birka, Sweden. Although the remains had been thought to be of a male warrior since the grave's excavation in 1878, both a 2014 osteological analysis and a 2017 DNA study identified that the remains were of a female. The 2017 study interpreted the person in Bj 581 as a high-ranking female professional warrior. This conclusion attracted worldwide attention and has been disputed by scholars who argue that grave goods do not establish the individual's social role or occupation.

== Excavation, remains, and grave goods ==
Archaeologist and ethnographer Hjalmar Stolpe (1841–1905) excavated a burial chamber grave in the 1870s as part of his archaeological research at the Viking Age site Birka on the island of Björkö in Mälaren, a lake in Sweden. In 1889 he documented the grave as Bj 581.

The grave was marked by a large stone boulder and was found on an elevated terrace where it was in direct contact with the garrison. The burial chamber was made out of wood, 3.45m long and 1.75m wide.

The grave contained a human skeleton, probably collapsed from a sitting position. The skeleton was later proved to be the remains of someone who was biologically female and over the age of 30.

Many weapons were found in the grave. The organic material had decayed, leaving only the metal parts intact. A Petersen type E sword was found in its sheath near the body, as well as the head of Petersen type M axe, and a seax. Near the sword was a small knife made of iron and a sharpening stone. Two spearheads, one from a spear that was placed in the grave, and one that was thrown in during ceremony. Twenty-five arrowheads of the Erik Wegraeus type D1 suggest a bow and full quiver of arrows. Finally, there were two shield bosses, one against the front wall of the grave, and the other on the opposite wall.

Scant garment remnants of silk, with silver brocade, were found about the skeleton along with a simple iron ring pin, suggesting the garments of a kaftan, and a cloak which would have been secured with the pin. Also found was a tasseled hat of samite trimmed with intricate silver ornaments. The garment remnants generally suggest an eastern material cultural similar as that of the Caucasus region.

A quarter silver dirham (a type of coin) of Nasr ibn Ahmad from the reign of al-Muktadir dates the grave to sometime shortly following 913–933 AD, likely 940-950 AD. Additional items found were a spearhead in miniature (thought to be an amulet), a set of three iron weights of the kind used for trade, a bronze vessel, three tin rods, the remains of a belt set, and forty pieces of mirror glass. The mirror glass pieces may have been a mirror that was broken, or used in their fragmented state as sequins on the kaftan.

A gaming set was also found in the grave, associated with military status and recognition of strategic skill. The set comprised 28 gaming pieces (including a king piece), three dice, and the iron frame of a gaming board. The dice, weights, and gaming pieces were wrapped in a bag.

Skeletal remains of a mare and a stallion lay on a platform of clay earth at one end of the grave, outside of the burial chamber, towards which the deceased human would have been facing while seated. Both of the horses were bridled for riding. The grave also included harnesses for pulling a chariot, ice crampons for the horses' hooves, a set of stirrups attached to the feet of the corpse, and an antler curry-comb

== Sex of deceased ==
Stolpe originally concluded that the buried person was an important male warrior, despite the fact that osteological analysis contemporary to that era that would have suggested a female skeleton. This misidentification remained widely accepted by archaeologists for nearly 140 years.

Osteological analysis first showed that the skeleton was female in the 1970s, but the findings were dismissed. In 2016, osteological analysis by Stockholm University bioarchaeologist Anna Kjellström again concluded that the skeleton was female.

In 2017, the female sex of the skeleton was confirmed by genomics in a study led by Charlotte Hedenstierna-Jonson of Uppsala University. Hedenstierna-Jonson's team extracted DNA from samples taken from a tooth and an arm bone of the remains buried in Bj 581. The skeleton had two different X chromosomes, but no Y chromosomes, conclusively proving that the bones are female.

Hedenstierna-Jonson points to patriarchal assumptions within academia as an explanation for the previous misidentification of the skeletal remains of Bj 581, stating, "Viking scholars have been reluctant to acknowledge the agency of women with weapons", and that "at Birka, grave Bj 581 was brought forward as an example of an elaborate high-status male warrior grave," despite skeletal evidence otherwise.

== Intrepretations of social identity ==
=== Viking warrior ===
Hedenstierna-Jonson's team concluded that the female corpse was not only a warrior, but an active, high-ranking officer.

The Hedenstierna-Jonson team considered questions about the social identification of the remains within the context of the martial objects buried with the bones, asserting that "the distribution of the grave goods within the grave, their spatial relation to the female individual and the total lack of any typically female attributed grave artifacts" disputed the possibilities that the artifacts belonged to the family of the deceased, or to a male "now missing" from the grave. An analysis of the weapons indicated that a trained warrior had used the weapons and were not ceremonial. The context of the grave, situated directly adjacent to the garrison in a martial community wherein activities of war were central and ritualized, demonstrates a strong association between the martial order at Birka and the occupant of grave 581. The study concluded that "the individual in grave Bj 581 is the first confirmed female high-ranking Viking warrior".

The 2017 Hedenstierna-Jonson study also carried out genomic and strontium isotope analysis of material collected from the skeleton and teeth to identify the geographic profile of the individual. This analysis found that while she had similar markers to those of present-day people living in areas under the sphere of influence of the Vikings, she was likely not from Birka but had settled there from southern Sweden or Denmark, and that she had experienced a high degree of geographic mobility throughout her lifetime. A high degree of mobility would have been associated in this period with people of high-ranking status, and supports the assertion that she was a social elite. This aligns with the analysis of the garment findings being of extremely fine caliber and consistent with eastern trade route material culture.

The gaming set found in the grave has been interpreted to support that the deceased individual was of the military caste, and possibly a leader skilled in military strategy. According to Kjellström, "Only a few warriors are buried with gaming pieces, and they signal strategic thinking." It has been suggested that the gaming set could be a kind of hnefatafl game.

=== Pushback, critique, and alternative interpretations ===
Critiques of the conclusion that Bj 581 contains female skeletal remains of a Viking warrior focus on the possibility that the weapons found in the grave should not be interpreted as possessions of the female individual found in the grave.

Fedir Androshchuk pointed to a failure to acknowledge the disturbed state of the Birka graves, the effect of the stone removal on the grave contents, and Stolpe's assistance from nonprofessionals for excavation, note-taking and drawings.

The term "warrior's grave" has been criticized; critics prefer the more neutral term, "weapons grave". In 1980, Anne-Sofie Gräslund disagreed with interpreting the graves at Birka as warrior graves, arguing that it implies the deceased was a full time warrior, when it is possible that presence of many weapons represents a social elite.

Judith Jesch critiqued the study's use of textual sources, as well as the failure to discuss alternative interpretations.

=== Response ===
The authors responded to the criticism in a second article published in Antiquity that provided additional information about their methodology and reaffirmed their conclusion. Hedenstierna-Jonson has stated that "Since [the site] was excavated in the 1870s, it has constantly been interpreted as a warrior grave because it looks like a warrior grave and it's placed by the garrison and by the hillfort," she says. "Nobody's ever contested it until the skeleton proved to be female, and then it was not a valid interpretation anymore."

Hedenstierna-Jonson stated that Hjalmar Stolpe was known for his meticulous note-taking and careful documentation. Each bone found in the grave had been labelled "Bj 581" with India ink at the time of excavation. Hedenstierna-Jonson's team also compared the measurement of each bone from Birka Bj 581 to the measurements of every other bone that Stolpe excavated at Birka and ruled out the possibility that the Bj 581 bones had mistakenly come from another grave.

Other scholars have pointed out that previous to the skeleton being identified as female, there was no hesitation to interpret the social status of the deceased as a high-ranking Viking warrior.

=== Reconsidering history ===
Numerous scholars have noted that cultural bias can result in incorrect interpretations of burial sites. The Hedenstierna-Jonson study concludes with the comment, "the combination of ancient genomics, isotope analyses and archaeology can contribute to the rewriting of our understanding of social organization concerning gender, mobility and occupation patterns in past societies."

Uppsala University issued a press release acknowledging the long-standing misidentification of the grave, stating that the grave had long "served as a model for what graves for professional Viking warriors looked like. Although several features of the skeleton indicate that it may have belonged to a woman, the assumption has always been that the person buried was a male Viking."

Swedish historian Dick Harrison of Lund University wrote, "What has happened in the past 40 years through archaeological research, partly fueled by feminist research, is that women have been found to be priestesses and leaders, too... This has forced us to rewrite history."

Additionally, Martin Rundkvist, archaeologist, wrote on his blog Aardvarchaeology,

Your skeleton can't tell us anything about your gender, and your grave goods can't tell us anything about your osteo-sex [sex as determined your by bones] …The plan of the grave shows which bones were well preserved. This should be enough to counter the charge that maybe the skeleton currently labelled Bj 581 is not in fact the one found in this weapon grave. This the authors should have written a few sentences about it… We still can't rule out the early removal of an articulated male body. But such an argument ex silentio would demand that we place similar female bodies in all other weapon graves as well. We can't just create the bodies we want in order for the material to look neat."

Holly Norton, historian and State Archaeologist of Colorado, posed these questions: "What does it mean that Bj 581 was a female? What does this reveal about the structure of Viking society? Was Bj 581 unique, or did she represent a category of women that has been largely relegated to mythology? And what can this tell us about how violent conflict was viewed and experienced?"

== Popular press coverage ==
After the 2017 genomic sex identification of the Birka Bj 158 skeleton, the following news outlets provided press coverage: National Geographic, CNN,The Guardian, the Washington Post, and the New York Times. In 2020, PBS aired an episode about Birka Grave Bj 581, titled "Viking Warrior Queen" on their show Secrets of the Dead .

== See also ==
- Baugrygr, Viking heiresses who were allowed to take over the role of head of the family and tasks normally performed by men.
- Shieldmaiden
- Warrior
- Women in post-classical warfare
- Women warriors in literature and culture
- Princess of Öland
