= Baugrygr =

Baugrygr or Ringkvinna was the term referred to an unmarried woman who had inherited the position of head of the family, usually from her father or brother, with all the tasks and rights associated with the position. The position existed in Scandinavia during the Viking Age and into the Middle Ages.

Ringkvinna is primarily mentioned in the Icelandic Grágás and the Norwegian Frostating laws and Gulating laws, in which it is phrased in much the same way. Unmarried women in general, referred to as maer and mey, were secure in their rights of independence: at the age of 20, a woman reached the right of legal majority and had the right to decide about her own place of residence and stand by herself in all juridical senses before the law. These same rights applied to widows. The one exception to her independence was the right to choose a marriage partner, which was a matter for the whole family.

In the absence of male relatives, an unmarried woman with no son could inherit the position as head of the family from a deceased father or brother. Women with such status were referred to as ringkvinna. She exercised all the rights afforded to the head of a family clan until she married at which time her rights were transferred to her husband. The right to inherit in itself applied to both the paternal aunt, paternal niece and paternal granddaughter of the deceased, who were all named as odalkvinna, but the right to inherit the position of head of the family was a right which could only be inherited by the daughter or the sister of a dead man.

The ringkvinna had the specific support of the law to perform all the tasks normally performed by a head of the family, such as, the right to demand and receive fines for the slaughter of a family member. If she married, however, these rights were passed on to her spouse. These rights gradually disappeared after Christianization, and they are no longer mentioned in any law texts after the late 13th century.

== See also ==
- Birka female Viking warrior
- Princess of Öland
- Åsa Haraldsdottir of Agder
- Aud the Deep-Minded

== Sources ==
- Borgström Eva (2002) Makalösa kvinnor: könsöverskridare i myt och verklighet (Stockholm: Alfabeta/Anamma) ISBN 91-501-0191-9 (in Swedish)
- Ohlander, Ann-Sofie & Strömberg, Ulla-Britt ( 2008) Tusen svenska kvinnoår: svensk kvinnohistoria från vikingatid till nutid (Stockholm: Norstedts Akademiska Förlag) ISBN 9789172275249 (in Swedish)
