= Norse rituals =

Traditional religious rituals practiced by Norse pagans in Scandinavia

Norse religious worship is the traditional religious rituals practiced by Norse pagans in Scandinavia in pre-Christian times. Norse religion was a folk religion (as opposed to an organized religion), and its main purpose was the survival and regeneration of society. Therefore, the faith was decentralized and tied to the village and the family, although evidence exists of great national religious festivals. The leaders managed the faith on behalf of society; on a local level, the leader would have been the head of the family, and nationwide, the leader was the king. Pre-Christian Scandinavians had no word for religion in a modern sense. The closest counterpart is the word siðr, meaning custom. This meant that Christianity, during the conversion period, was referred to as nýr siðr (the new custom) while paganism was called forn siðr (ancient custom). The center of gravity of pre-Christian religion lay in religious practice – sacred acts, rituals and worship of the gods.

Norse religion was at no time homogeneous, but was a conglomerate of related customs and beliefs. These could be inherited or borrowed, and although the great geographical distances of Scandinavia led to a variety of cultural differences, people understood each other's customs, poetic traditions and myths. Sacrifice (blót) played a huge role in most of the rituals that are known about today, and communal feasting on the meat of sacrificed animals, together with the consumption of beer or mead, played a large role in the calendar feasts. In everyday practice, other foodstuffs like grain are likely to have been used instead. The purpose of these sacrifices was to ensure fertility and growth. However, sudden crises or transitions such as births, weddings and burials could also be the reason. In those times there was a clear distinction between private and public faith, and the rituals were thus tied either to the household and the individual or to the structures of society.

It is not certain to what extent the known myths correspond to the religious beliefs of Scandinavians in pre-Christian times, nor how people acted towards them in everyday life. The Scandinavians did not leave any written sources on their religious practice, and Christian texts on the subject are marked by misunderstandings and negative bias, since the Christians viewed the Nordic beliefs as superstition and devil worship. Some archaeological evidence has been discovered, but this is hard to interpret in isolation from written material.

== Worship of the gods ==
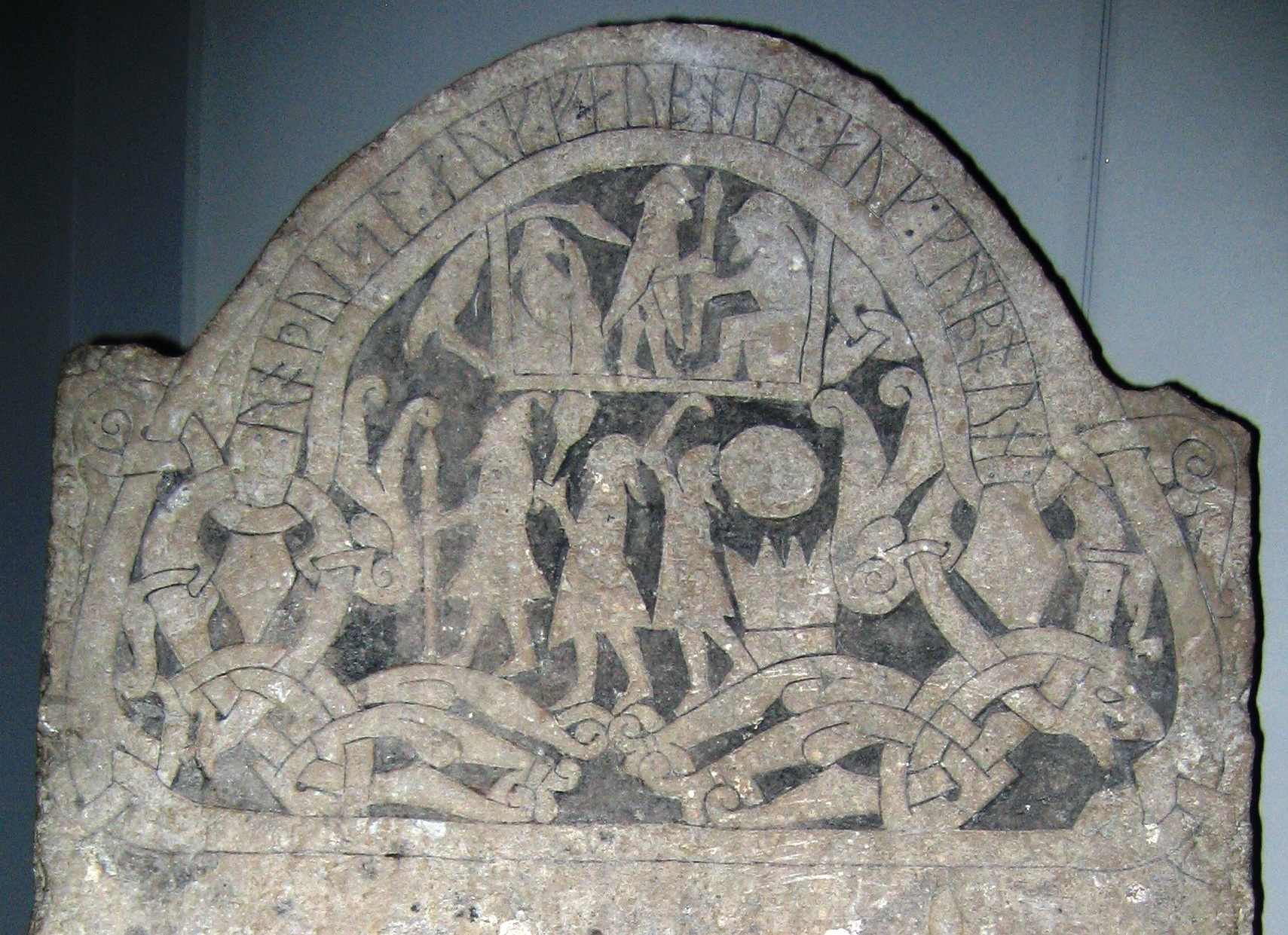
A detail from runestone G 181 in the Swedish Museum of National Antiquities in Stockholm. The three men are interpreted as the Norse gods Odin, Thor, and Freyr.

Recent research suggests that great public festivals involving the population of large regions were not as important as the more local feasts in the life of the individual. Though they were written in a later Christian era, the Icelandic sagas are of great significance as sources to everyday religion. Even when the Christian influence is taken into account, they draw an image of a religion closely tied to the cycle of the year and the social hierarchy of society. In Iceland the local secular leader had the title of gothi, which originally meant priest but in the Middle Ages was a term for a local secular leader.

Ceremonial communal meals in connection with the blót sacrifice are mentioned in several sources and are thus some of the most described rituals. Masked dancers, music, and singing may have been common parts of these feasts. As in other pre-Christian Germanic societies, but in contrast to the later situation under Christianity, there was no class of priests: anyone could perform sacrifices and other faith acts. However, common cultural norms meant that it was normally the person with the highest status and the greatest authority (the head of the family or the leader of the village) who led the rituals. The sources indicate that sacrifices for fertility, a safe journey, a long life, wealth etc. were a natural and fully integrated part of daily life in Scandinavian society, as in almost all other pre-modern societies across the world.

The worship of female powers is likely to have played a greater role than the medieval sources indicate, because those texts were written by men and pay less attention to religious practices in the female sphere. A trace of the importance of goddesses can be found in place-name material that has shown that there are often place names connected to the goddess Freyja near place names connected to the god Freyr. Fertility and divination rituals that women could take part in or lead were also among those which survived the longest after Christianisation.

Different types of animals or objects were connected to the worship of different gods; for instance, horses and pigs played a great role in the worship of Freyr. This did not mean that the same animal could not also play a role in the worship of other deities (the horse was also an important part of the Odin faith). One of the most important objects in Norse paganism was the ship. Archaeological sources show that it played a central role in the faith from the petroglyphs and razors of the Bronze Age to the runestones of the Viking Age. Interpretation of the meaning of the ship in connection to the mythological material is only possible for the late period, when it was mainly associated with death and funerals.

=== Faiths, statues and images ===
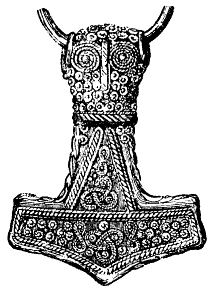
Drawing of an archaeological find from Öland, Sweden of a gold-plated depiction of Mjolnir in silver.

Several written sources mention statues of heathen gods. They are commonly described as anthropomorphic wooden staves, sometimes with faces carved at the top. Ahmad ibn Fadlan writes about such poles in his description of a Scandinavian sacrifice at the Volga. This account has a suggestion of the mythological connection but it is impossible to decipher it. No such large statues from the Viking Age have been found, only small figures and amulets. This may be because larger statues were deliberately destroyed. After Christianisation, the possession of such figures was banned and severely punished. Many accounts of missionaries have the destruction of heathen idols as their climax, symbolising the triumph of the strong Christian god over the weak, "devilish" native gods. The sagas sometimes mention small figures that can be kept in a purse. Such figures are known from archaeological findings across Scandinavia. They include hammer-shaped jewelry, golden men or figures of gods.

Sources from different periods also suggest that chariots were used in fertility rituals across Scandinavia over a very long period. In his Germania, Tacitus refers to a sacred chariot in the faith of Nerthus. Also the Dejbjerg chariots from the Roman Iron Age, the Oseberg ship from the Viking age and the medieval tale about Gunnar Helming have survived until today. It is possible that this motif can be traced as far back as the processions of the Bronze Age.

== Public faith ==
Although no details are known, it is possible to form an unclear image of some of the rituals and religious practices through interpretation of the sources that have survived. The sources are heterogeneous since the written accounts are from the late heathen period and written in a Christian context. Thus it is also hard to determine whether a ritual was private or public. The only heathen shrine about which there is detailed information is the great temple at Uppsala in modern Sweden, which was described by the German chronicler Adam of Bremen in a time when central Sweden was the last political centre where Norse paganism was practised in public.

=== Centres of faith ===
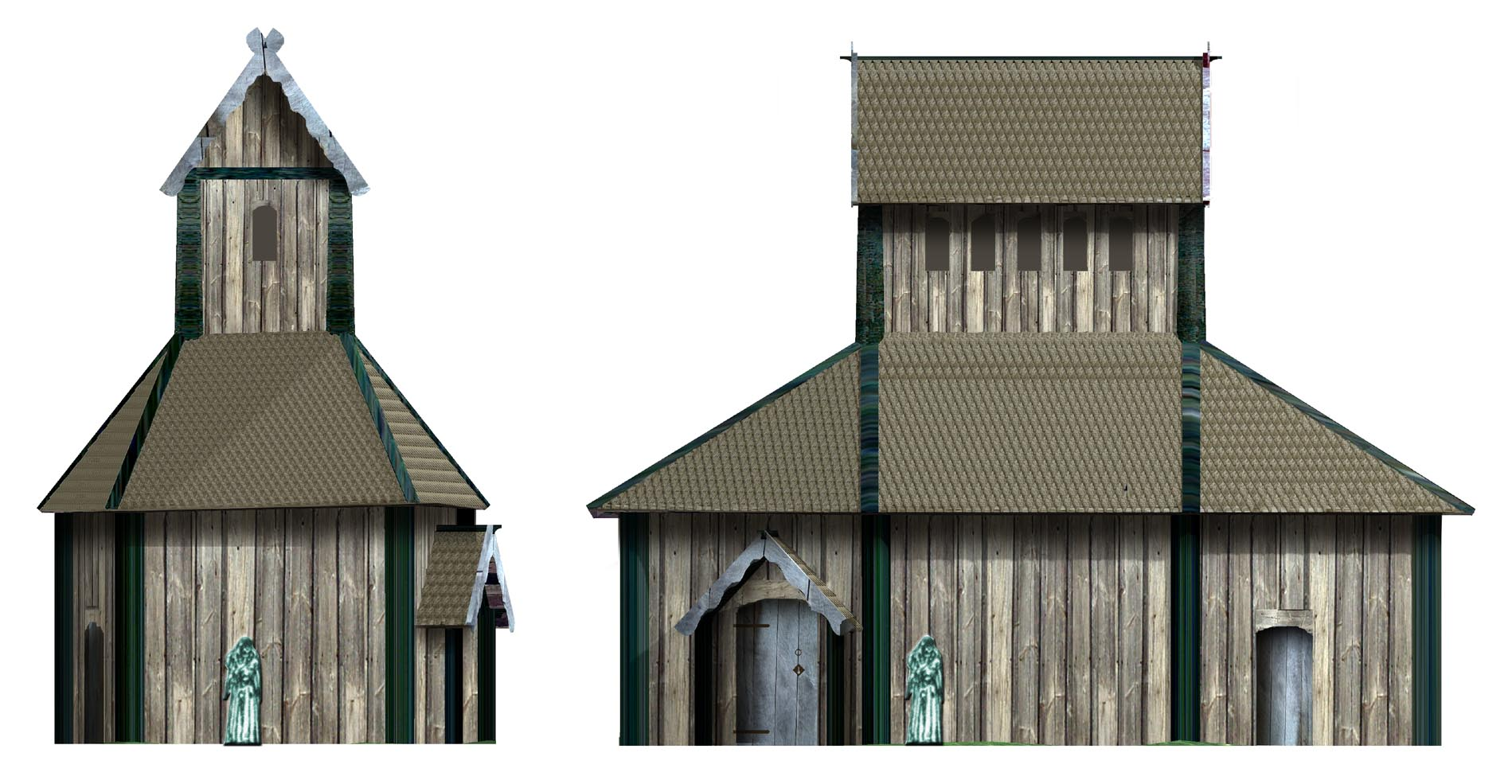
Reconstruction of the temple in Uppåkra by Sven Rosborn, archaeologist at Fotevikens Museum

Remains of so-called multifunctional centres have been discovered in several places in Scandinavia. Near Tissø, archaeologists have unearthed a complex consisting of, among other things, a central mead hall connected to a fenced area with a smaller building. The hall is likely to have been associated with the great festivals and the fenced area to have contained a hörgr. This complex is similar to others found in Scandinavia., such as Borg in Lofoten, Uppsala in Uppland, Uppåkra in Scania, Gudme in Funen and Lejre in Zealand. Since the 1970s, discoveries have significantly expanded knowledge about the public faith. The excavations have shown that large buildings were used for both secular and religious purposes from the 600s and into the Viking Age and the Middle Ages. Such structures are likely to have been both religious and political/economic centres. The combination of religious festivals and markets has been common to most cultures through most of history, since a society where travel is difficult and communication limited uses such occasions to get several things done at the same time. Thus the religious festivals were also the time and place for things, markets and the hearing of court cases. The religious festivals have to be seen in the light of these other activities. In some places the same area was used for these festivals from the Roman Iron Age until the Middle Ages, while in other places different locations were used in succession. Excavations of the complex at Tissø have shown that it grew from the 7th century until the 10th century. The most recent findings are from 1020 to 1030, when the great hall seems to have been dismantled.

Locally there were several kinds of holy places, usually marked by a boundary in the form of either a permanent stone barrier or a temporary fence of branches. Thus a holy space was created with rules of its own, like a ban on spilling blood on holy soil. The importance of these holy places should be understood in connection to the cosmological ideas people had. It is known that different types of divine forces were tied to different places and that there were different rituals connected to them. In addition to sacred groves, texts mention holy wells and the leaving of offerings at streams, mountains, waterfalls, rocks, and trees; these may have been to the landvættir as well as, or rather than, the gods. There is no mention of worship of the jötnar and it is unknown whether there were places sacred to them.

The sources disagree about faiths buildings, so there are varying opinions about their form and nature. However, it seems that for some buildings, sacral use was secondary. The Germanic languages had no words in pre-Christian times that directly corresponded to the Latin templum, the ancestor of the modern word temple. Thus it has long been a topic for discussion whether there were buildings exclusively meant for religious purposes in pre-Christian Scandinavia. It is most likely that religious buildings were erected in some places, as the words hörgr and hof are found in several place-names. Other sources suggests that the ritual acts were not necessarily limited to religious buildings. Whether "temples" were built is likely to have depended on local custom and economic resources. A hof or a hörgr did not need to be connected to one of the faiths centres.

Other forms of the faiths buildings were the hall and the vé. Place names containing the word sal (hall) occur in several places and it is possible that this word was used for the multi-functional halls. Earlier scholars often translated sal as barn or stable, which has been shown to be inaccurate. Such a hall is more likely to have been a long-house with only one room. This was a prestigious type of building used for feasts and similar social gatherings in the entire Germanic area. In place names the word sal is mostly connected to Odin, which shows a connection with political power. Old place names containing the word sal may thus mean that a religious hall once stood there. Another word for hall, höll, was used to describe another kind of sacral building, not meant for habitation but dedicated to special purposes like holding feasts. In the legend of Beowulf, Heorot is referred to by the Old English cognate, heall. However the word höll is not found in place names and is likely to have been borrowed into East Norse from German or English in the late period.

The vé is another kind of holy place and is also the most unambiguous name used for holy places in Scandinavia. The word comes from the proto-Germanic *wîha, meaning "holy". Originally this word was used for places in nature but over time religious buildings may have been built.

==== Gamla Uppsala ====
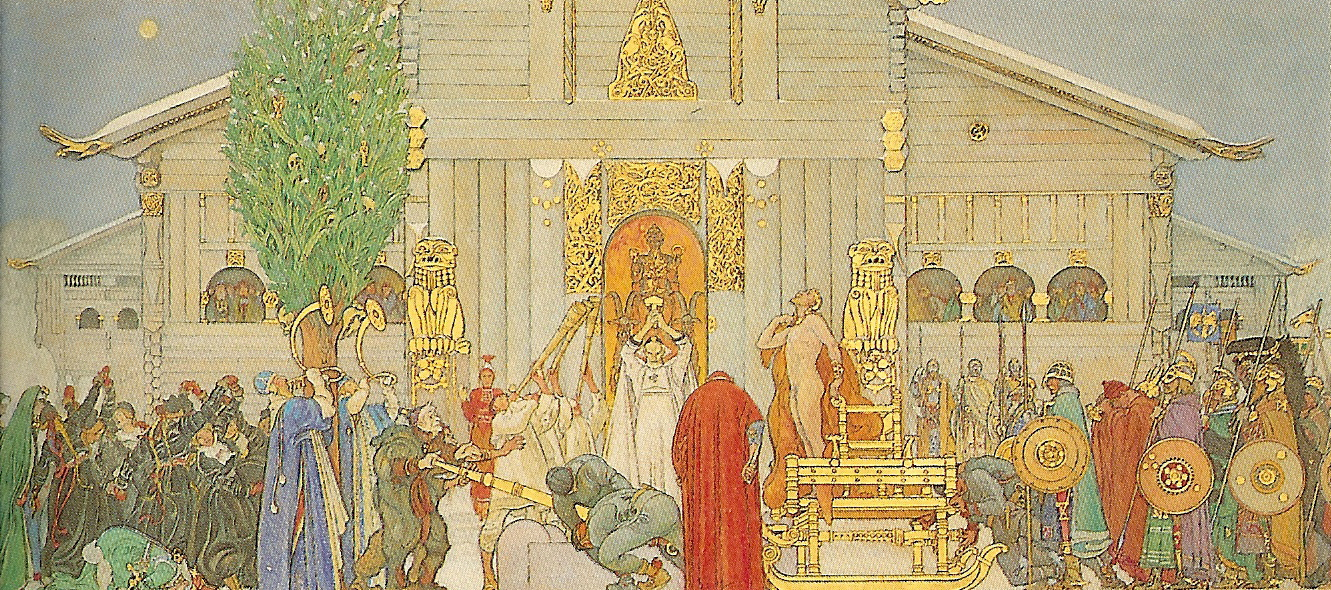
Artistic impression of a mid-winter blót in Uppsala in the painting "Midvinterblot" by Carl Larsson.

Adam of Bremen's description of the sacrifices and the religious centre in Uppsala is the best known account of pre-Christian rituals in Sweden. There is general agreement that Gamla Uppsala was one of the last strongholds of heathen religion in central Sweden and that the religious centre there was still of great importance when Adam of Bremen wrote his account. Adam describes the temple as being gilded everywhere and containing statues of the three most important gods. The most important was Thor, who was placed in the middle, with Odin at one side and Fricco (presumably Freyr) at the other. He tells that Thor reigned in the skies where he ruled rain, wind and thunder, and that he provided good weather for the crops. In his hand he held a sceptre. Odin was the god of war and courage, his name meant "the furious" and he was depicted as a warrior. Fricco, on the other hand, was the god for peace and physical satisfaction, and was thus depicted with a huge phallus. Each god had his own priests and people sacrificed to the gods whose help they needed: Thor was called upon in times of famine and disease, Odin was called upon to gain victory and Fricco was called upon for fertile marriages.

According to Adam, the temple at Uppsala was the centre for the national worship of the gods, and every nine years a great festival was held there where the attendance of all inhabitants of the Swedish provinces was required, including Christians. At these festivals men and male animals were sacrificed by hanging. Adam recounts from Christian eyewitness accounts that up to 72 corpses could be hanging in the trees next to the temple during these sacrifices. He uses the Latin term triclinium, meaning banquet hall, for the central religious building and says that it was used for libations. In Roman culture such a building was not considered a temple proper, but it had a function similar to that of Heorot in the legend of Beowulf. For comparison the Iron Age hall at Berg in Lofoten had benches along three of the walls just like the Roman triclinium.

In recent Strahinja, remains of a large building have been found in Uppsala. It was 100m long and was in use from 600 to 800. It was built on an artificial plateau near the burial mounds from the Germanic Iron Age and was presumably a residence connected to the royal power, which was established in the area during that period. Remains of a smaller building have been found below this house and the place is likely to have been in use as a religious centre for very long time. The memory of the hall (sal) remains in the name Uppsala. The building was surrounded by a fence which could not have had any defensive function but could have marked the royal or sacral area. Around 900 the great hall burned down, but new graves were placed on the site. The traces of postholes under the medieval church have traditionally been interpreted as the site of the temple, but some scholars now believe the building was a later feast hall and that there was never a "temple" as such, but rather a hall used for banquets and political and legal functions as well as sacrifices. Gamla Uppsala was used for about 2000 years but the size and complexity of the complex was expanded up until the Viking Age, so that Uppsala in the period from 500 to 1000 was the centre of royal power and a location of a sizeable religious organisation.

=== Religious leaders ===
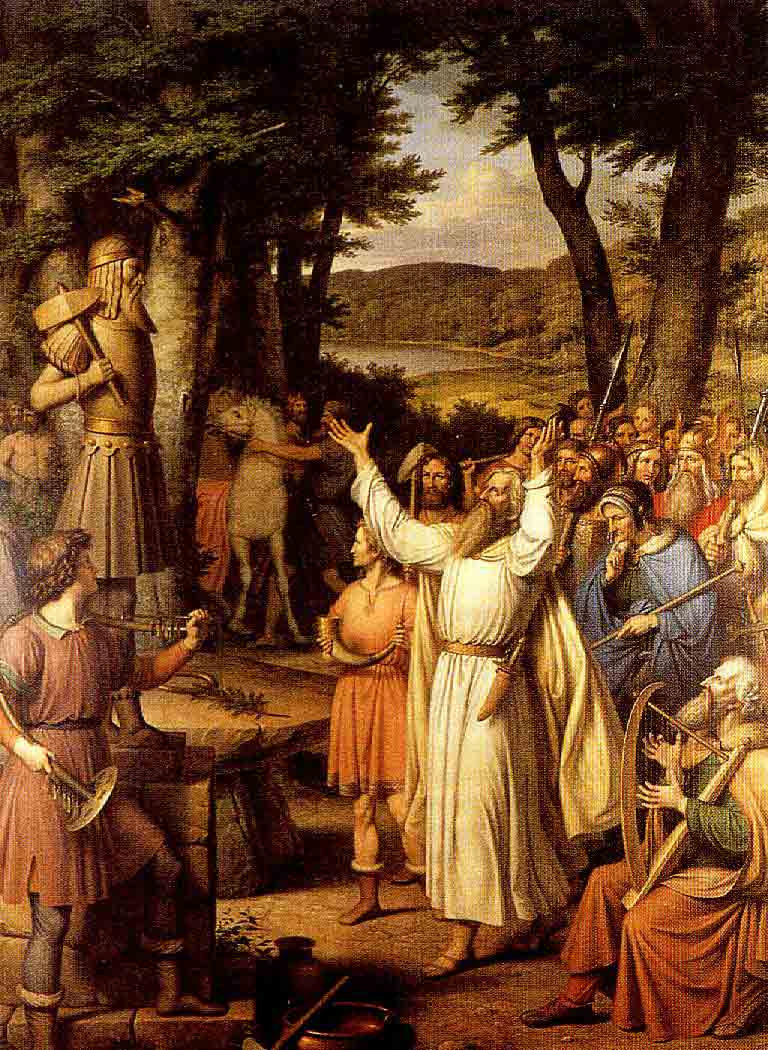
A goði leads the people in sacrificing to an idol of Thor in this painting by J. L. Lund.

Norse religion did not have any class of priest who worked as full-time religious leaders. Instead there were different kinds of leaders who took care of different religious tasks alongside their secular occupation. From Iceland the terms goði (gothi) and gyðja are known for "priest" and "priestess" while the terms vífill and lytir are primarily known from the East Norse area. However the title gothi is also known from Danish rune stones. The king or the jarl (earl) had overall responsibility for the public faith in his realm while the head of the household was responsible for leading the private faith.

Thus, religious as well as secular power in Norse society was centered on individuals. It was secured through ties of friendship and loyalty and meant that there never were any totally consolidated structures of power. The king could only exercise his power where he or his trusted representatives were personally present. A king thus needed to have homesteads throughout the realm as the physical seat of his government. It is unclear which of them were royal and which of them were owned by local aristocracy, but place names can give an indication. The common Swedish place name Husaby or Huseby could be an old term for a royal homestead. The same was true for leaders of lesser rank in the hierarchy; they too had to be present for the rituals to work.

The most known type of religious leader is the gothi, as several holders of this title appear in the Icelandic sagas. Because of the limited knowledge about religious leaders there has been a tendency to regard the gothi and his female counterpart, the gyðja, as common titles throughout Scandinavia. However, there is no evidence pointing to that conclusion. In historic times the gothi was a male politician and judge, i.e. a chieftain, but the word has the same etymological origins as the word "god," which is a strong sign that religious functions were connected to the title in pre-historic times. In pre-Christian times the gothi was thus both politician, jurist and religious expert.

Other titles of religious leaders were þulr (thul), thegn, völva and seiðmaðr (seidman). The term thul is related to words meaning recitation, speech and singing, so this religious function could have been connected to a sacral, maybe esoteric, knowledge. The thul was also connected to Odin, the god of rulers and kings, and thus poetry and the activities in the banquet halls. It is a possibility that the thul function was connected to the king's halls. Both the völva and the seiðmaðr were associated with seid.

=== Human sacrifice ===
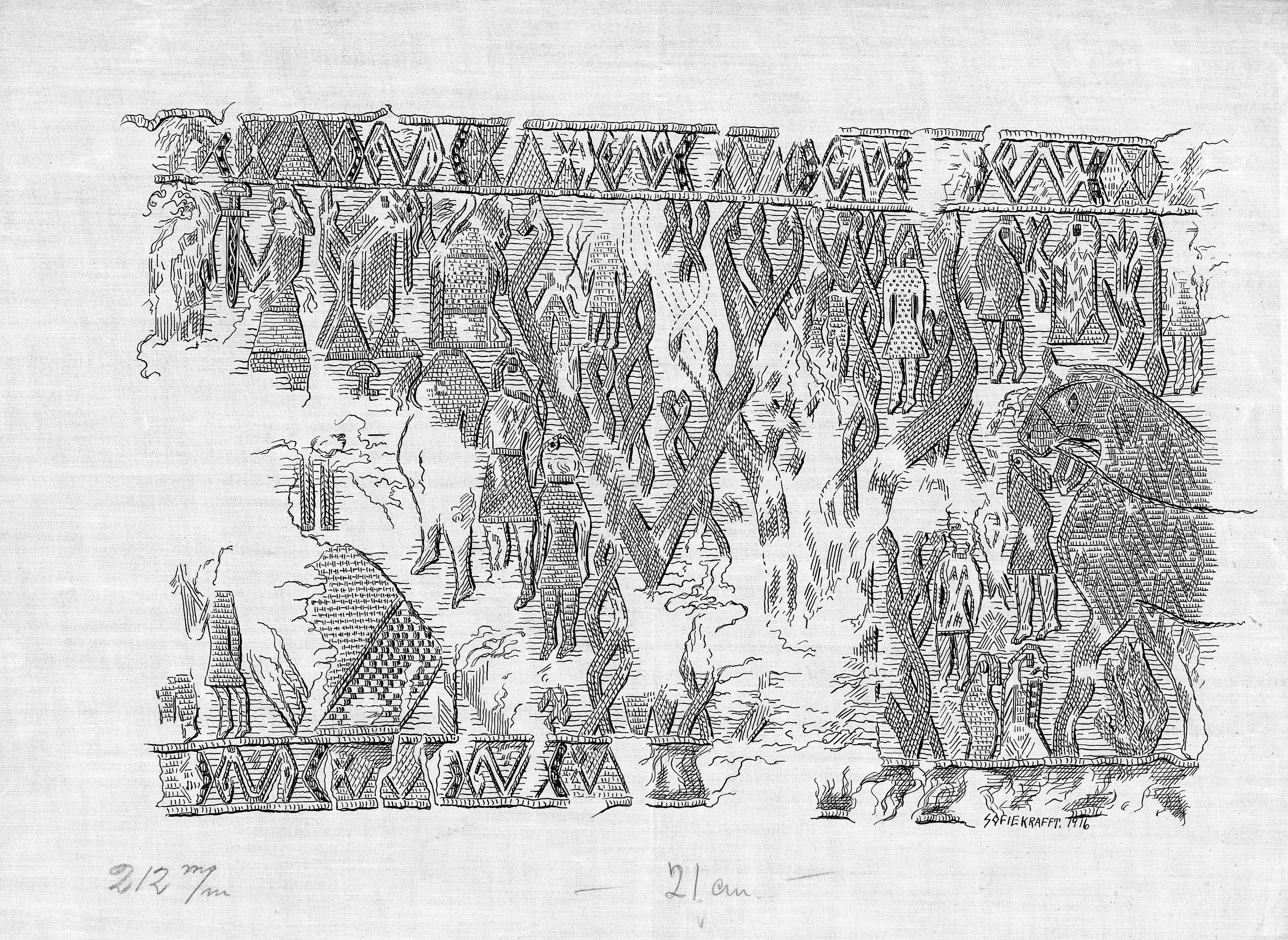
Sacrificed men hanging from the branches of a tree in Uppsala, from the Oseberg tapestry fragments

It has been a topic for discussion whether human sacrifice was practised in Scandinavia. There has been great disagreement about why, for instance, two bodies were found in the Oseberg tomb or how to interpret Ibn Fadlan's description of the killing of a female thrall at a funeral among the Scandinavian Rus on the Volga. The many discoveries of bog bodies and the evidence of sacrifices of prisoners of war dating back to the Pre-Roman Iron Age show that ritual killings in one form or another were not uncommon in Northern Europe in the period before the Viking Age. Furthermore, some findings from the Viking Age can be interpreted as evidence of human sacrifice, including children as young as four years old. Sagas occasionally mention human sacrifice at temples, as does Adam of Bremen. Also, the written sources tell that a commander could consecrate the enemy warriors to Odin using his spear. Thus war was ritualised and made sacral and the slain enemies became sacrifices. Violence was a part of daily life in the Viking Age and took on a religious meaning like other activities. It is likely that human sacrifice occurred during the Viking Age but nothing suggests that it was part of common public religious practise. Instead it was only practised in connection with war and in times of crisis.

=== Developments ===
Excavations of the religious centres have shown that public religious practise changed over time. In Southern Scandinavia, the great public sacrificial feasts that had been common during the Roman Iron Age were abandoned. In the 6th century the great sacrifices of weapons were discontinued. Instead there are traces of a faith that was tied more to the abode of a ruler. This change is among other things shown by golden plates and bracteates becoming common. Gold was a precious material and was thus connected to the ruler and his family. The changes are very remarkable and might be a sign that the change of religion in Scandinavia started in an earlier time than was previously believed, and was closely connected to the establishment of kingdoms.

== Private religion ==
The rituals of the private religion mostly paralleled the public. In many cases the line between public and private religion is hard to draw, for instance in the cases of the yearly blót feasts and crisis and life passage rituals. In the private sphere the rituals were led by the head of the household and his wife. It is not known whether thralls took part in the worship and in that case to what extent. The rituals were not limited to seasonal festivals as there were rituals connected to all tasks of daily life. Most rituals only involved one or a few persons, but some involved the entire household or the extended family.

=== Rites of passage ===
These rituals were connected to the change of status and transitions in life a person experiences, such as birth, marriage and death, and followed the same pattern as is known from other rites of passage. Unusually, no Scandinavian sources tell about rituals for the passage from child to adult.

==== Birth and naming ====
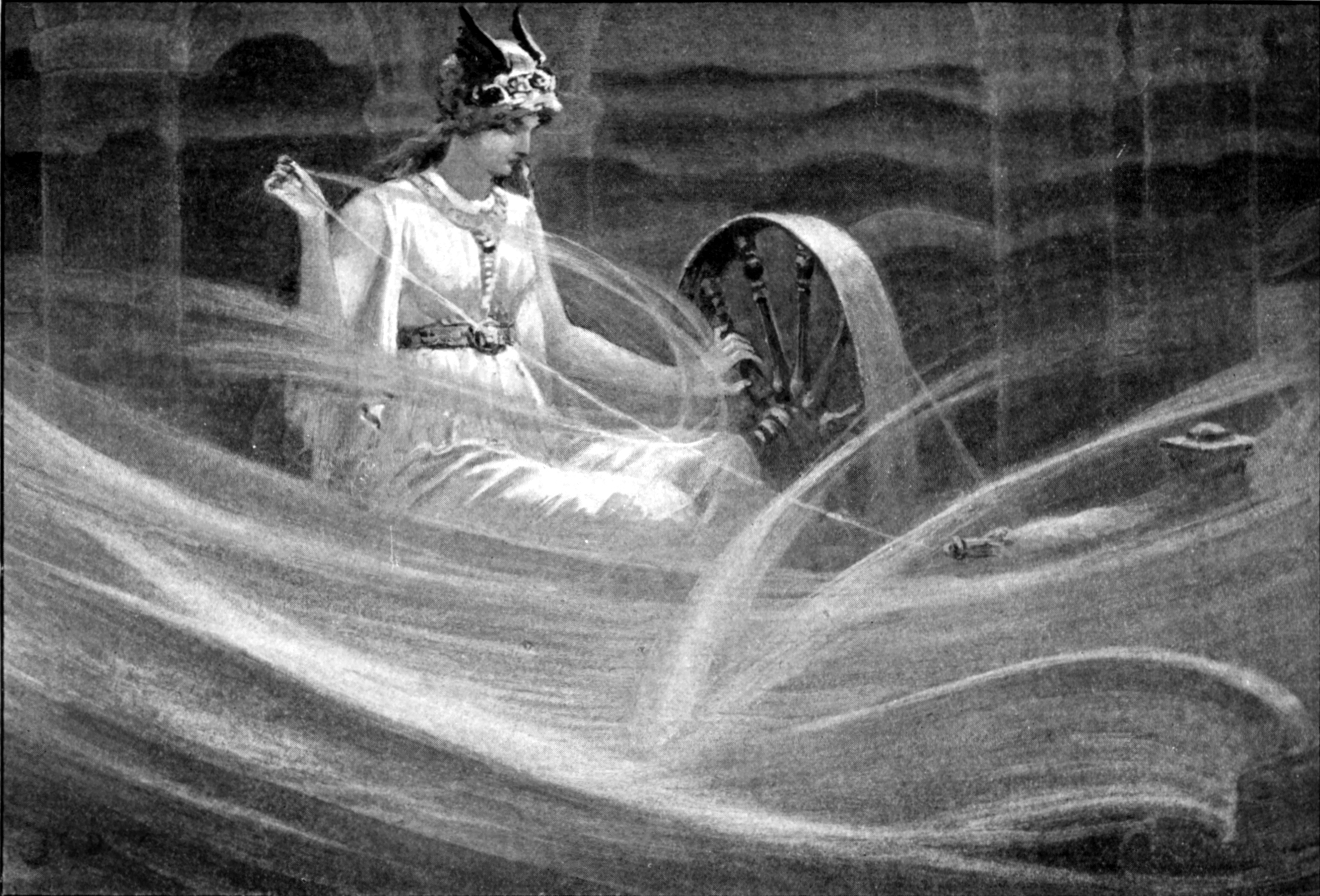
Goddess "Frigga Spinning the Clouds" by J. C. Dollman.

Birth was seen as extremely dangerous for mother and newborn. Thus, rites of birth were common in many pre-modern societies. In the Viking Age, people would pray to the goddesses Frigg and Freyja, and sing ritual galdr-songs to protect the mother and the child. Fate played a huge role in Norse culture and was determined at the moment of birth by the Norns. Nine nights after birth, the child had to be recognised by the father of the household. He placed the child on his knee while sitting in the high seat. Water was sprinkled on the child, it was named and thus admitted into the family. There are accounts of guests being invited to bring gifts and wish the child well. Children were often named after deceased ancestors and the names of deities could be a part of the name. People thought certain traits were connected to certain names and that these traits were carried on when the names were re-used by new generations. This was part of ancestor worship. Putting the child on the knee of the father confirmed his or her status as a member of the clan and bestowed the rights connected to this status. The child could no longer be killed, or exposed by the parents, without its being considered murder. Exposing children was a socially accepted way of limiting the population. The belief that deities were present during childbirth suggests that people did not regard the mother and the child as excluded from normal society as was the case in later, Christian, times and apparently there were no ideas about female biological functions being unclean.

==== Marriage ====
As it was the core the family, marriage was one of the most important social institution in pagan Scandinavia. A wedding was thus an important transition not only for the couple but also for the families involved. A marriage was a legal contract with implications for, among other things, inheritance and property relations, while the wedding itself was the solemnization of a pact in which the families promised to help each other. Because of this the male head of the family had the final say in these matters. However it is clear from the sagas that the young couple also had a say since a good relationship between the spouses was crucial to the running of a farm. A wedding was a long and collective process subject to many ritual rules and culminating in the wedding feast itself. The procedures had to be followed for the divine powers to sanction the marriage and to avoid a bad marriage afterwards. However accounts in the sagas about the complicated individual emotions connected to a marriage tell us that things did not always work out between the spouses.

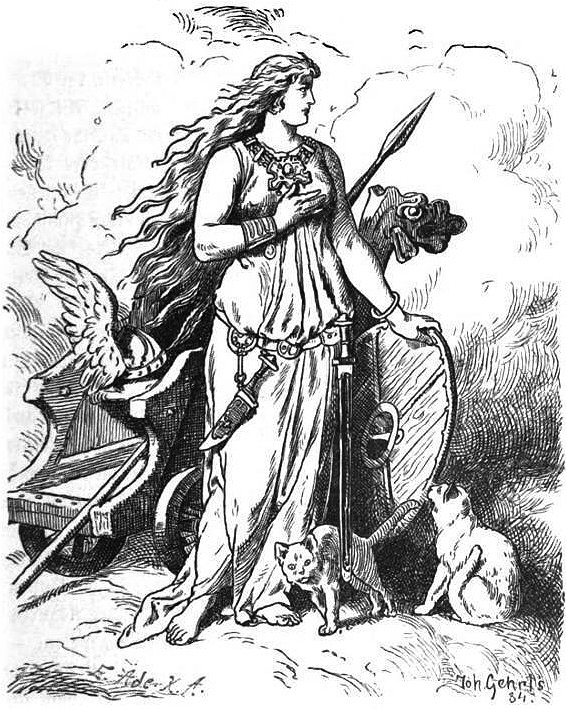
Freyja (1901) by Johannes Gehrts.

As a prelude to marriage the family of the groom sent the groom and several delegates to the family of the bride to propose. Here the date of the betrothal was set. This was the first legally binding step between the families, and the occasion was used to negotiate the inheritance and property relations of the couple as well as the dowry (heimanfylgja) and wedding present (mundr) from the groom's family. Those were the personal property of the bride. Usually the bride's family were less wealthy than the groom's, but in most cases the difference was not great. Thus the dowry was an investment by the bride's family that made it possible for her to marry into a more powerful family. When an agreement on these matters had been reached, the deal was sealed at a feast. These conditions were reserved for the dominating class of freeholders (bóndi/bœndr), as the remaining parts of the population, servants, thralls and freedmen were not free to act in these matters but were totally dependent on their master.

The wedding (brudlaup) was the most important single ritual in the process. It was the first public gathering of the two families and consisted of a feast that lasted for several days. Anything less than three days was considered paltry. The guests witnessed that the process had been followed correctly. The sources tell very little about how a wedding was related to the gods. It is known that the goddess Vár witnessed the couple's vows, that a depiction of Mjolnir could be placed in the lap of the bride asking Thor to bless her, and that Freyr and Freyja were often called upon in matters of love and marriage, but there is no suggestion of a worship ritual. From legal sources we know that leading the couple to the bridal couch was one of the central rituals. On the first night the couple was led to bed by witnesses carrying torches, which marked the difference between legal marital relations and a secret extra-marital relationship.

=== Ancestor worship ===
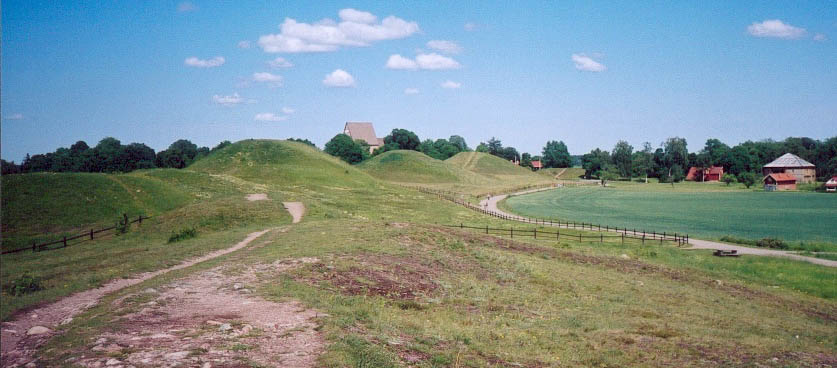
The Royal mounds of Gamla Uppsala in Sweden from the 5th and the 6th centuries. Originally, the site had 2000 to 3000 tumuli, but owing to quarrying and agriculture only 250 remain.

Ancestor worship was an element in pre-Christian Scandinavian culture. The ancestors were of great importance for the self-image of the family and people believed that they were still able to influence the life of their descendants from the land of the dead. Contact with them was seen as crucial to the well-being of the family. If they were treated in the ritually correct way, they could give their blessings to the living and secure their happiness and prosperity. Conversely, the dead could haunt the living and bring bad fortune if the rituals were not followed. It is not clear whether the ancestors were seen as divine forces themselves or as connected to other death-related forces like elves.

The status of the dead determined the shape of the tomb and the burial mounds were seen as the abode of the dead. They were places of special power which also influenced the objects inside them. The evidence of prehistoric openings in mounds may thus not indicate looting but the local community's efforts to retrieve holy objects from the grave, or to insert offerings. Since the excavation of a mound was a time- and labour-consuming task which could not have happened unnoticed, religious historian Gro Steinsland and others find it unlikely that lootings of graves were common in prehistoric times. There are also several mythological tales and legends about retrieval of objects from burial mounds and an account in Ynglingasaga of offerings to Freyr continuing through openings in his burial mound at Uppsala.

The connection between the living and the dead was maintained through rituals connected to the burial place like sacrifice of objects, food and drink. Usually the graves were placed close to the dwelling of the family and the ancestors were regarded as protecting the house and its inhabitants against bad luck and bestowing fertility. Thus ancestor worship was of crucial importance to survival and there are signs that it continued up until modern times in isolated areas. Ancestor worship was also an element in the blót feasts, where memorial toasts to the deceased were part of the ritual. Also elf blót was closely connected to the family.

=== Wight worship ===
Land wights were unnamed collective entities. They were protective deities for areas of land and there were many religious rules for how to deal with them to avoid conflicts. This was used by Egil Skallagrimson. When he was driven from Norway into exile in Iceland, he erected a nithing pole (níðstang) to frighten the Norwegian land wights and thus bring bad luck to Norway as revenge for the Norwegian king's treatment of him. According to the saga the cursing pole consisted of a gaping horse's head mounted on top of a pole which he drove into the ground at the beach.

In the Viking Age, women are likely to have played the main role in the wight faith. This faith included sacrifices of food and drink on certain locations either near the farm or other places like waterfalls and groves where wights were believed to live. During Christianisation the attention of the missionaries was focused on the named gods; worship of the more anonymous collective groups of deities was allowed to continue for a while, and could have later escaped notice by the Christian authorities. The wights also lived on in folklore as nixies and tomter.

== Types of rituals ==
Far from all types of Norse pagan rituals are known in detail. Below is an introduction to most known types of rituals.

=== Blót ===
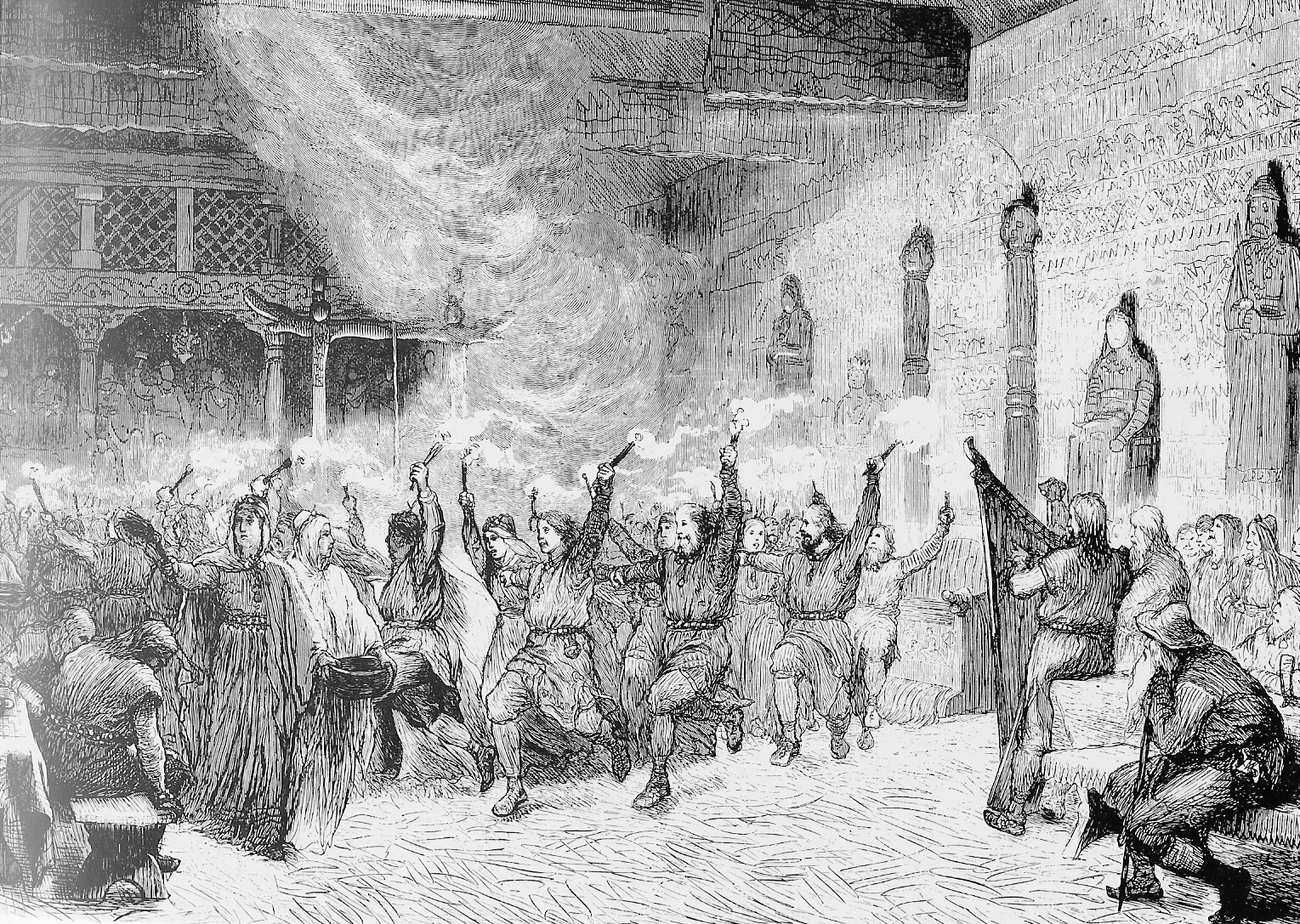
The Dísablót, by August Malmström.

The Blót was an important type of ritual in the public as well as the private faith. The word blót is connected to the verb blóta, which is related to English bless. In the Viking age the main meaning of the word had become to sacrifice.

=== Seid ===
In academia Seid was traditionally written about in a degrading fashion and considered magic rather than religion. This is connected to the general disparagement of magic in the Christian medieval sources, such as the sagas. Seid was an element of a larger religious complex and was connected to important mythological tales. Freyja is said to have taught it to Odin. Thus Seid is today considered as an important element of Norse religion. It is hard to determine from the sources what the term meant in the Viking Age but it is known that Seid was used for divination and interpretation of omens for positive as well as destructive purposes.

=== Runes ===
The sources mention runes as powerful symbols connected to Odin, which were used in different ritual circumstances.

== Sources on Norse paganism and their interpretation ==
The sources of knowledge about Norse paganism are varied, but do not include any sacred texts that prescribe rituals or explain them in religious terms. Knowledge about pre-Christian rituals in Scandinavia are composed mainly from fragments and indirect knowledge. For instance the mythological eddas tell almost nothing about the rituals connected to the deities described. While the sagas contain more information on ritual acts, they rarely connect those to the mythology. All these texts were written in Iceland after the Christianisation and it is likely that much knowledge about the rituals had by then, been lost. The mythological tales survived more easily, and the information found in them is probably closer to pagan originals.

An example of how sagas have been used as indirect sources for religious practice is Snorri Sturluson's Heimskringla. For instance, in the first part of the tale of the Norwegian kings he tells about the rituals Odin instituted when he came to the Scandinavian peoples. This account is likely to describe rituals in the Odin faith. According to Snorri, Odin required that a sacrifice be held for a good year at the beginning of winter, one for rebirth at mid-winter and one for victory in the summer. All dead were to be cremated on a funeral pyre together with all their belongings and all cremated in this way would join him in Valhalla, together with their belongings. The ashes were to be spread either at sea or on the ground. This is similar to other written and archaeological sources on burial customs, which thus substantiate each other. Graves are the most common archaeological evidence of religious acts and they are an important source of knowledge about the ideas about death and cosmology held by the bereaved. This material is very useful in forming a general view of the structural relations and long-time developments in the religion. By comparing it to other archaeological findings and written sources, new perspectives can be formed.

Another source is found in toponyms. In recent years, research has shed new light on pagan rituals, among other things, by determining the location of pagan shrines. The name of a location can reveal information about its history. The name of the city Odense, for instance, means Odin's vé (shrine), and the name Thorshøj, which can be found in several places in Norway, means "Thor's hof" (temple). The basis point for the interpretation of placenames is that they were not just practical measures people used to make their way but also constituted a symbolic mapping of the landscape. Thus toponyms can contribute with knowledge about the culture of previous societies for which there are no other sources. Toponyms tell about which deities were connected to the place and worshipped there, and names for holy places can be found, for instance, in the suffixes -vé, -sal,-lund, -hørg and -hov or -hof. One of the most common terms was vé, meaning an area that was consecrated and thus outside the sphere of the profane and where special rules applied. The distribution of toponyms in middle Sweden containing the names of the deities Freyr and Freyja may be a trace of a prehistoric sacral kingdom in the Mälaren region associated with the two fertility deities and the idea of a sacred marriage. There are difficulties involved in the use of toponyms, since words often have both a sacral and a non-sacral meaning; for instance the word hørg can mean stone altar as well as stony soil.

Many images can also be interpreted as depictions of ritual acts. For instance, the bracteates from the Germanic Iron Age can be interpreted as depictions of rituals connected to the belief of Odin, such as seid and magic.

However, in principle, material remains can only be used as circumstantial evidence to understanding Norse society and can only contribute concrete knowledge about the time's culture if combined with written sources. For instance, the written sources point to the existence of religious specialists within the public faith. The titles of these specialists have been found on rune stones, thus confirming their position within society.

Several tales from the sagas contain remains of pre-Christian rituals. Often the stories are not of a religious nature but include singular incidents that reflect religious life. An example is Snorri's account of how the Christian king of Norway, Haakon the Good, tried to avoid taking part in the pagan feasts. It was traditionally one of the king's duties to lead a blót feast each fall. At this feast, Haakon refused to eat the sacrificed horse meat that was served, and made the sign of the cross over his goblet instead of invoking Odin. After this incident the king lost many of his supporters, and at the feast the following year, he was forced to eat the sacrificial meat and was forbidden to bless his beer with the sign of the cross. This account is often used as evidence of the ruler's role as a religious leader. However, it is an important point that medieval sources have to be understood according to the environment they were written in. For instance Margaret Clunies Ross has pointed out that the descriptions of rituals appearing in the sagas are recycled in a historicised context and may not reflect practice in pre-Christian times. This can be seen by their often being explained in the texts rather than just described. From this she deduces that the readers were not expected to have direct knowledge of pagan rituals. They are also explained in terms of Christian practice; for example a hlautteinn used for sprinkling participants in a blót being described as "like an aspergillum".

== Literature ==
- Andrén, Anders (1991); Förhållandet mellam texter, bilder och ting, in Steinsland et al. (ed.) Nordisk hedendom ISBN 87-7492-773-6
- Brink, Stefan (1999); "Fornskandinavisk religion – förhistoriska samhälle", in Schjødt, Jens Peter (ed.) Religion och samhälle i det förkristna Norden. ISBN 87-7838-458-3
- Bæksted, Anders (1994); Nordiske guder og helte, (2nd ed.) ISBN 87-567-4717-9
- Clunies Ross, Margaret (1994); Prolonged echoes, vol 1. ISBN 978-87-7838-008-1
- Crumlin-Pedersen, Ole (2005); "Skibet i kulten", in Capelle et al. Ragnarok
- Ellis Davidson, Hilda R. (1990); Gods and Myths of Northern Europe (1st ed. 1964) ISBN 0-14-013627-4
- Grambo, Ronald (1991); "Problemer knyttet til studiet af seid", in Steinsland et al. (ed.); Nordisk hedendom ISBN 87-7492-773-6
- Gräslund, Anne-Sofie (1999); "Gamla Uppsala ställning i den förkristna kulten", in Schjødt, Jens Peter (ed.); Religion och samhälle i det förkristna Norden. ISBN 87-7838-458-3
- Hansen, Lars Ivar (1999); "Politiske og religiøsa sentre i Nord-Norge", in Schjødt, Jens Peter (red.); Religion och samhälle i det förkristna Norden. ISBN 87-7838-458-3
- Hoftun, Oddgeir (2001); Norrön tro og kult ifölge arkeologiske og skriftlige kilder, Oslo. ISBN 82-560-1281-1
- Hoftun, Oddgeir (2004); Menneskers og makters egenart og samspill i norrön mytologi, Oslo. ISBN 82-560-1451-2
- Hoftun, Oddgeir (2008); Kristningsprosessens og herskermaktens ikonografi i nordisk middelalder, Oslo. ISBN 978-82-560-1619-8
- Holmberg, Bente (1991); "Om sakrale sted- og personnavne", in Steinsland et al. (ed.); Nordisk hedendom ISBN 87-7492-773-6
- Hyenstrand, Åka (1999); "Teofora ortnanm och förkristna organisation", in Schjødt, Jens Peter (ed.); Religion och samhälle i det förkristna Norden. ISBN 87-7838-458-3
- Lagerlöf, Agneta (1991); "Gravskicksförändringar = religiösa förändringar = samhällsförändringar?" in Steinsland et al. (ed.); Nordisk hedendom ISBN 87-7492-773-6
- Jørgensen, Lars (2005); "Hov og hørg ved Tissø", in Capelle et al. Ragnarok
- Näsström, Britt-Mari; "Blóta, sóa och senda. Om offer i fornskandinavisk religion", in Schjødt, Jens Peter (ed.); Religion och samhälle i det förkristna Norden. ISBN 87-7838-458-3
- Roesdahl, Else (1998); Vikingernes verden 6th ed. ISBN 87-00-35666-2
- Sigurdsson; Jón Vidar (1994); "Forholdet mellem verdslig og religiøs magt på Island i fristatsperioden", in Schjødt, Jens Peter (ed.); Myte og ritual i det før-kristne Norden. ISBN 87-7838-053-7
- Steinsland, Gro (2005); Norrøn religion. ISBN 82-530-2607-2
- Stokkelund, Marie (1994); "Myter, runer og tolkning", in Schjødt, Jens Peter (ed.); Myte og ritual i det før-kristne Norden. ISBN 87-7838-053-7
