= Leif Østby =

Norwegian art historian

Leif Østby (2 January 1906 – 23 December 1988) was a Norwegian art historian. He was the first Conservator at the National Gallery of Norway from 1949-73.

== Biography ==
Østby was born in Skjeberg in Østfold, Norway. His parents were Emil Augustinius Østby (1868-1937) and Klara Josefine Eeg (1870-1952). He graduated artium at Sarpsborg in 1925 and became Cand.philol. in 1933 with a history major.

Østby worked as a lecturer at Vestheim in Oslo from 1934-46. From 1934-36, he was also engaged by Norsk Portrettarkiv, the department which collected and preserved photographs for the National Archives. From 1935-37, he was an artist at Aftenposten. Between 1946-47 and 1966–70, he lectured in art history at the University of Oslo. In 1946 he became a conservator at the National Gallery of Norway. Three years later he became the first conservator, a position he had until 1973. He also edited the journal Kunst og Kultur from 1962 to 1980.

He published several works on the history of art and on individual artists, including Harald Sohlberg, Hjalmar Haalke, Johan Christian Dahl, Theodor Kittelsen and Erik Werenskiold. Østby was a member of the Norwegian Academy of Sciences from 1956 and was awarded an honorary doctorate at the University of Oslo in 1986. He was decorated Knight, First Class of the Order of St. Olav in 1973. He died during 1988 at Bærum in Akershus.

== Selected works ==
- Norges kunsthistorie (1938)
- Ung norsk malerkunst (1949)
- Norsk tegnekunst i Nasjonalgalleriet (1963)
- Verdens kunsthistorie with Ragna Thiis Stang (1963)
- Erik Werenskiold (1977)
- Fridtjof Nansen som kunstner (1980)
