= Tord Pedersen =

Norwegian historian (1857–1926)

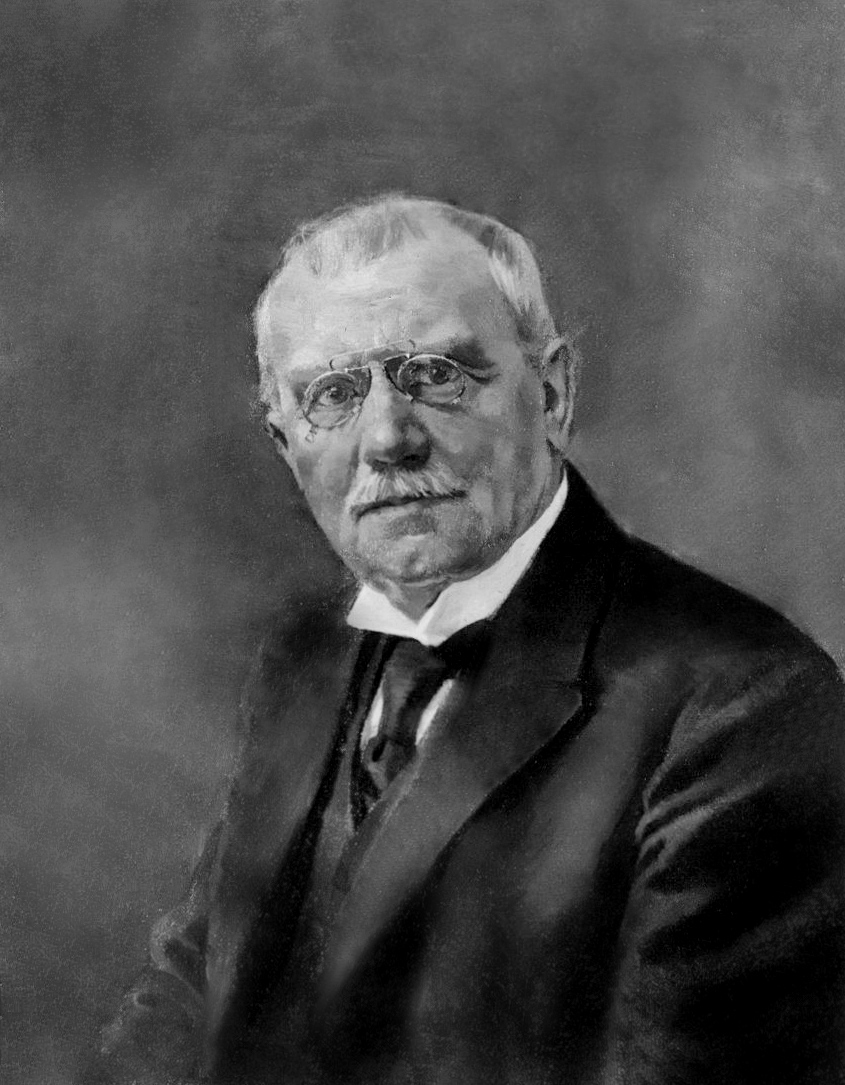
- Born: August 11, 1857
- Died: December 8, 1926 (aged 69)
- Occupation: Historian

Tord Pedersen (August 11, 1857 – December 8, 1926) was a Norwegian teacher and historian.

Pedersen served as the head of the Drammen Latin School. He was the uncle of Haakon Shetelig.

== Awards and recognitions ==
- Knight of the Order of St. Olav, 1911
- Fridtjof Nansen Prize for Outstanding Research, 1922, for his work on the history of Drammen
- Member of the Norwegian Academy of Science and Letters, 1922

== Bibliography ==
- Drammen: en norsk østlandsbys utviklingshistorie: avhandlinger og skildringer (Drammen: The Development History of an East Norwegian Town: Essays and Descriptions). 2 vols. Drammen: Harald Lyche, 1912, 1921
