= Oseberg tapestry fragments =

Fragments of tapestry discovered in the Oseberg ship burial in Norway

Oseberg Tapestry Fragments
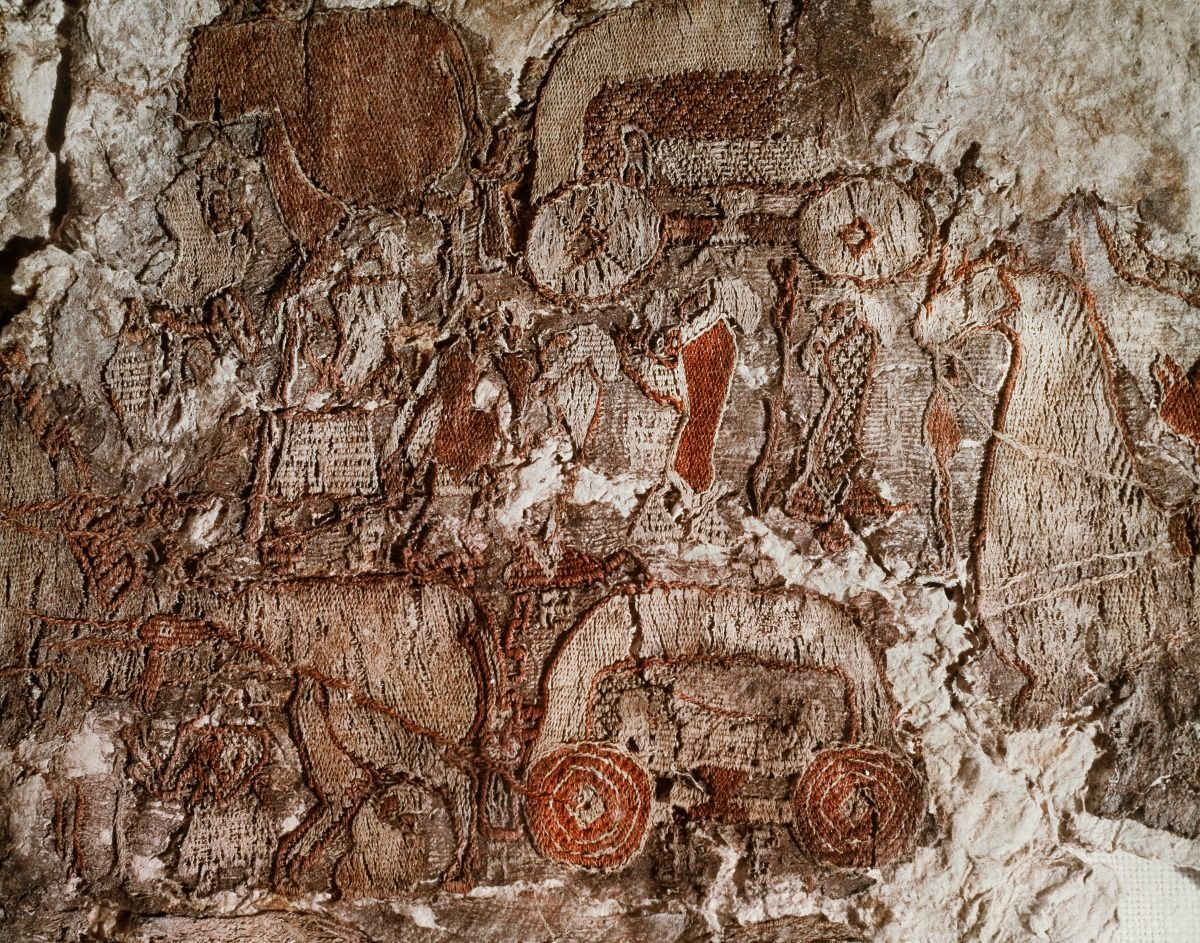
- Year: 834AD
- Medium: Silk, Flax
- Location: Viking Ship Museum in Oslo, Norway

The Oseberg tapestry is a fragmentary tapestry, discovered within the Viking Oseberg ship burial in Norway.

The tapestry (dated to about 834AD) is 16 to 23 centimeters in width, but the full length is unknown. The tapestry is filled with a large assortment of human and animal figures with varying interpretations. It is made from wool, silk, and flax.

The fragments were found in 1904 in Norway inside of a well-preserved Viking ship, along with numerous other grave goods and two female bodies.

== Discovery and excavation ==
The Oseberg find was excavated in the summer of 1904 on the Oseberg farm at Slagen, not far from Tønsberg. The burial mound was excavated by Professor Gabriel Gustafson and his team from the University of Oslo.

Due to the amount of clay, soil, and peat packed together so tightly, it allowed for an unbelievable quality of preservation of all the wooden objects and also all other organic materials contained in the ship, including the ship itself. It is thought to be the best-preserved grave from the Viking Age.

Unfortunately, the ship and all of the contents inside were not left undisturbed until its 1904 excavation. Presumably around the Middle Ages, robbers had broken into the grave through a hole in the bow of the ship and into the burial chamber of the ship. The entirety of the ship itself was also in poor shape, as the large amount of stones contained within the ship had caused considerable sinkage, and in turn, caused the ship to be broken up into thousands of pieces which then had to be painstakingly put back together.

The tapestry was one of a number of textile remains found in the Oseberg ship in 1904. Other finds included rolled-up rugs, tapestries, and curtains. Most are embroidered with mythological and battle scenes. There was no representation of the ship's owner.

Most of the textiles that were found within the ship were found in the burial chamber. They had also been pressed together in hard "cakes" due to the clay and soil that filled the inside of the ship, which had also been a very difficult job to disintegrate. Some of these textiles were also stuck to large clumps of feathers, which originally were in the beds of the burial chamber.

=== Remains ===
At the entrance of the ship that the robbers had created, the skeletal remains of two people were found lying on the beds of the burial chamber.

These remains that were found within the burial mound were assumed to be female, even prior to analysis of the physical remains themselves. Gustafson was able to come to the conclusion that this was a grave for a pair of women due to the textile remnants they were found with, along with tools for making textiles. The women were assumed to be some kind of royalty due to the elaborate nature of the burial mound and its contents. They have been labeled as queens, queen-consorts, widowed queens, or kings mothers.

The skeletal remains of horses, oxen, and dogs were also found in and around the burial mound.

=== Other grave goods ===
Most of the artifacts that were buried within the ship alongside the women were found in the forepart of the ship. Many of the ship’s tools such as the oars, a gangway, a bailing vessel, tubs, pails, etc. were found here. There was also an ornamented cart, decorated sleighs, and a wood sled found within these artifacts. Skeletons of animals were also found in and around the ship.

Some personal effects that were found with these women were chests, buckets, and carved posts in the shape of animal heads. There was no jewelry found on or around the remains, which led archaeologists to come to the conclusion that any had been stolen by the robbers, as personal jewelry is an important factor in a Viking woman’s burial.

== Description ==
The tapestry is in poor condition and is assumed to be a part of the funeral offering of the ship burial. Due to its state of decay several years were required for its extraction, and today its extraction is still yet to be completed.

The tapestries consist of an assortment of both people and animals, as well as ships, wagons, and houses. The tapestry is an example of both Viking Age narrative art, and decorated textiles from Scandinavia in this period, both of which being extremely rare survivors.

The two largest, which are also the most well-preserved fragments, depict figures of armed people and animals moving to the left as if they are part of a funeral procession or religious ceremony. The precession is headed towards a great tree with corpses hanging from it; it is unknown what this represents. The fragments also contain a scene featuring two black birds hovering over a horse, possibly originally pulling a wagon as a part of the procession. The most central and prominent figures in this scene are two covered, horse-drawn carriages. Between them, there is an assortment of male and female figures walking and riding together, some carrying objects such as spears, which were seen as Odin's special weapon. Some figures depicted in this procession appear to wear ritual costumes, as one figure is depicted in a horned helmet while another wears an animal-head mask.

Due to the loss of most of its original coloring, the material of these fragments consists mostly of shades of brown and grey.

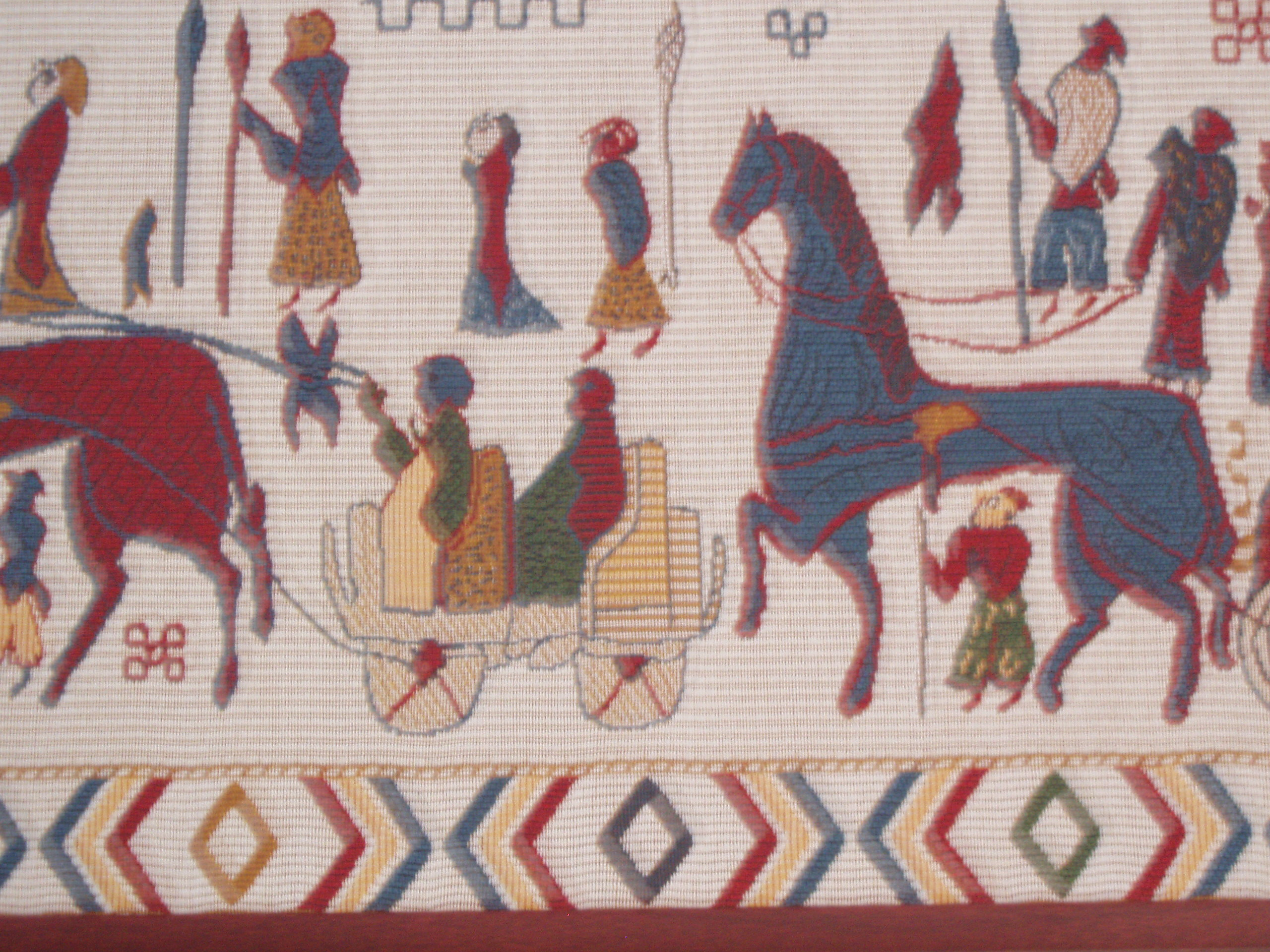
Oseberg tapestry detail

=== Interpretations ===
It is unknown what these tapestries are supposed to represent despite their images and figures. There have been many differentiating interpretations of the fragments, such as that this tapestry depicts an actual funeral procession or even the funeral ceremony in Oseberg itself. Anne Stine Ingstad interprets these birds as Huginn and Muninn flying over a covered cart containing an image of Odin with a horned helmet, drawing comparison with the images of the goddess Nerthus who is attested by Tacitus in 1 A.D.

The tapestry is stylistically similar to the Bayeux Tapestry, because of its narrative art style, colors, and overall movement of the forms. The figures in the Oseberg tapestry move horizontally such as those in the Bayeux Tapestry. Both are also referred to as “tapestries” while they are both embroideries, since the design is not woven into the cloth.

== Materials ==
The fragments are all made from wool and silk, as well as other plant-based materials such as flax, which have since disintegrated prior to their discovery. There is no trace of linen in the tapestry due to the condition that it was found in, but flax was cultivated into linen during this time period, and tools used for linen work were also found within the ship. It is assumed that the silk was imported, while the woolen contents were native work.

== Historical context ==
=== Viking burials ===
The living had a duty to care for the dead and bury them, and all of the dead were treated with the utmost respect, no matter who they were. The first step of the burial is typically the treatment of the body. Both the eyes and the mouth of the body were shut, and they were washed with their hair combed. Following the treatment, the body was then placed on a straw bed, and after a number of days the corpse could then either be buried or burnt. Inhumation was the most common form of burial, typically in some kind of coffin, or in more elaborate cases, in a chamber. Cremation was also occasionally practiced.

Following the treatment of the body, if the body was intended to be buried, a grave would be formed. These graves could be created in a variety of forms such as, circular, triangular, oval, or in the shape of a boat. Sometimes they were surrounded by stones. If the graves were flat, sometimes, such as in the case of the Oseberg burial, mounds were created.

The dead were typically buried with objects and utensils from their daily life. Some grave goods also served a symbolic function, such as boats and wagons, like in the Oseberg burial, were a representation of their journey into the afterlife. These items were all intended to equip the dead for their journey into the next world.

They were also sometimes accompanied by their dogs or horses. The dead in cremation graves could also be accompanied by grave goods.

=== Textiles ===
Textiles from the Viking Age are very diverse, with a variety of different weave styles, along with colored patterning, dyeing, and decorative additions. There was a need for this wide variety of styles. Textiles were needed for clothing, whether it was everyday garb or special costumes. They were needed for upholstery, bedding, carpets, and wall hangings, as well as many other purposes. One of the most important needs for textiles was for sails and tents. The materials varied, primarily wool and plant fibers such as flax, but other materials like silk, gold, and silver threads were also used.

Textile fragments have been found in many different burials, along with textile tools.

The manufacture of textiles was important during the Viking Age, but it also required the work of several people. The production process included the harvesting of the fibers and then preparing them for spinning and weaving, before finally sewing them into the finished product.

Textiles and the raw material required for textile production were traded and exchanged for valuable goods.
