= Gabriel Gustafson =

Swedish-Norwegian archaeologist

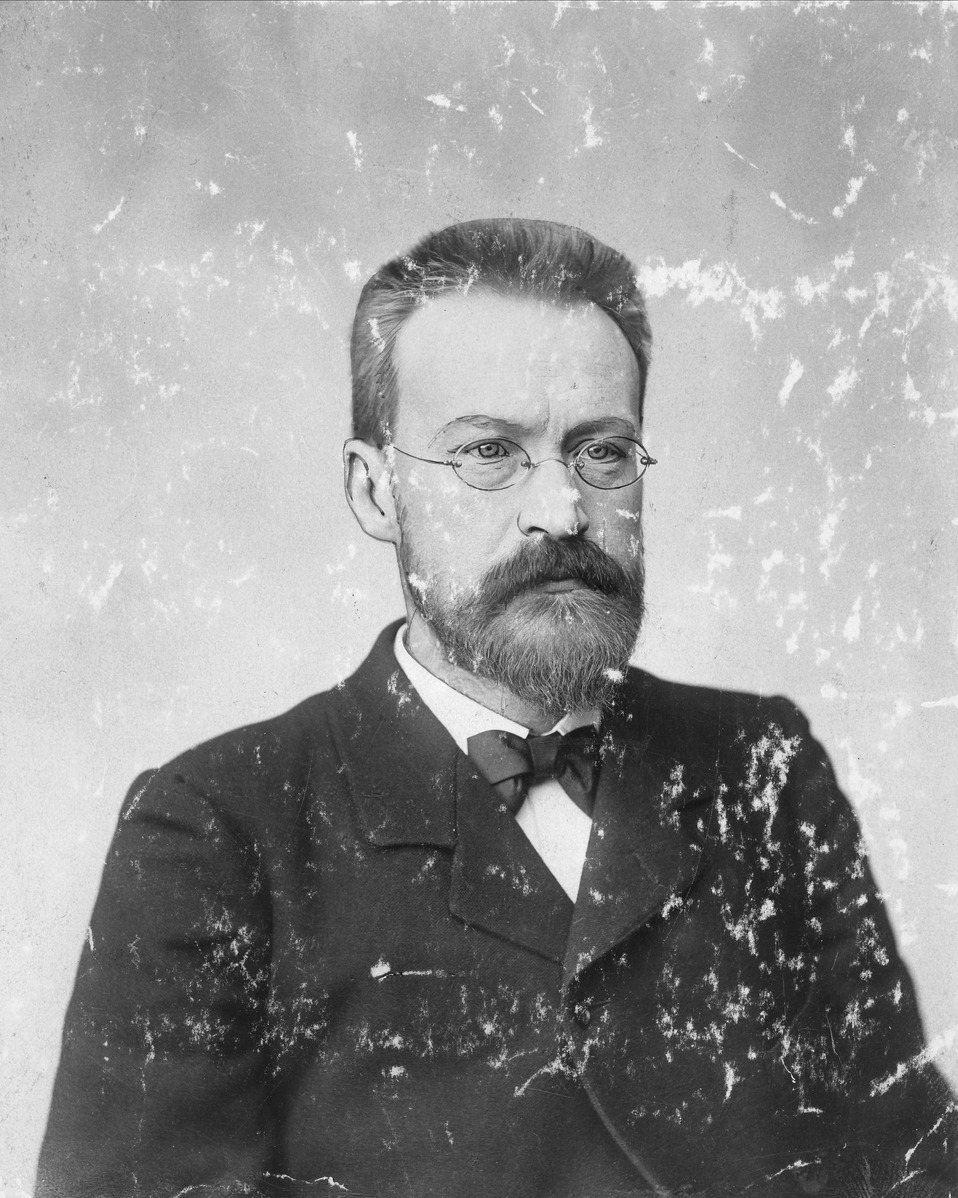
Gabriel Adolf Gustafson

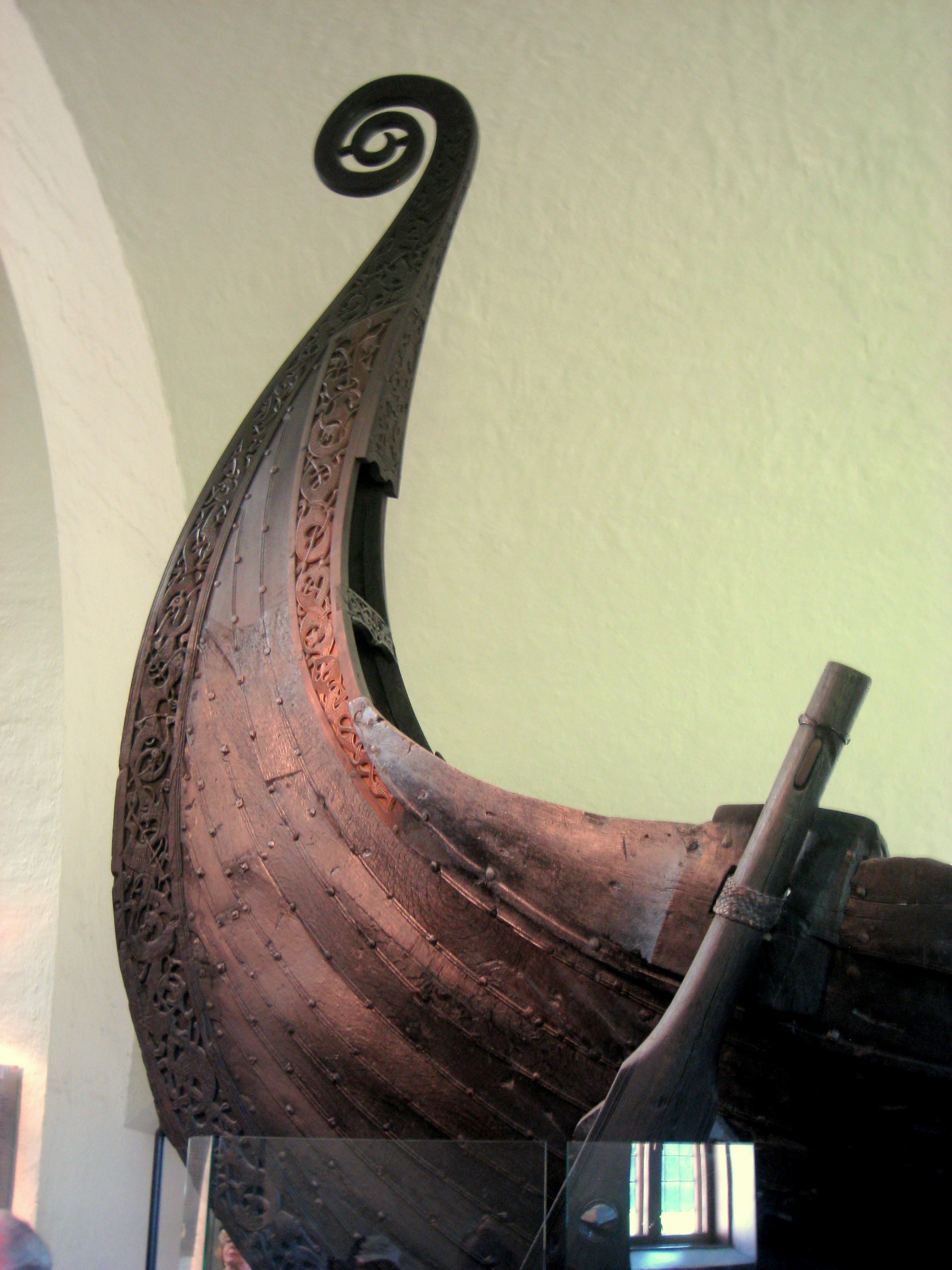
Oseberg ship

Gabriel Adolf Gustafson (8 August 1853 – 16 April 1915) was a Swedish-Norwegian archaeologist. He was responsible for the excavation and conservation of the Oseberg Ship (Osebergfunnet) .

== Biography ==
Gabriel Gustafson was born in Visby, in Gotland County, Sweden. Gustafson studied at the Uppsala University earning a degree in Archaeology (1871). He was a professor at Uppsala University (1875–1889). Gustafson was employed by the University of Bergen as a conservator from 1889 to 1900. In 1900, following the death of Oluf Rygh, he was appointed manager of the University Museum of National Antiquities at University of Kristiania, (now University of Oslo) and professor of archaeology.

Gustafson is best known for his work, together with Haakon Shetelig, during 1904–05 on the Viking Age Oseberg ship (Osebergskipet) near Tønsberg in Norway. He was awarded with the appointment of Knight of 1 Class of the Order of St. Olav in 1911.

Although Gustafson is best known for his work on the Oseberg find, starting in 1893, he led the local branch of the Society for the Preservation of Ancient Norwegian Monuments. Gustafson and Hans Aall, a Norwegian politician, prepared a bill, supported by Jørgen Brunchorst, a naturalist, politician and Member of Parliament, that created the Norwegian Cultural Heritage Act (Bill of 1897). The law took effect in 1905. Today, this act is regarded as a supreme Norwegian law that takes precedence over other laws in cases of mutual conflict.

== Other sources ==
- Hagen, Anders (1968) The Viking Ship Finds: The Oseberg, Gokstad, and Tune Ships (Universitetets Oldsaksamling)
- Hougen, Bjørn (1965) Gabriel Gustafson, et 50-års minne (in "Viking", book 29", Oslo: Norsk Arkeologisk Selskap)
- Shetelig, Haakon (1928) Queen Asa's Sculptors: Wood Carvings found in the Oseberg Ship, Norway (London: Burlington House)
- Sjovold, Thorleif (1969) The Oseberg Find and the Other Viking Ship Finds Mary Fjeld Sjovold, translation (Universitetets Oldsaksamling)
