= Kunst og Kultur =

Norwegian cultural magazine

- Editor: Bente Aass Solbakken (2018-present)
- Categories: Culture magazine
- Publisher: National Museum of Art, Architecture and Design
- First issue: 1910
- Country: Norway
- Based in: Oslo
- Language: Norwegian

Kunst og Kultur (meaning Art and Culture in English) is a Norwegian art historical journal founded in 1910 by Harry Fett and Haakon Shetelig. Leif Østby edited the journal from 1962 to 1980. Editor from 2018 is Bente Aass Solbakken. The magazine has its headquarters in Oslo.

== See also ==
- Open access in Norway
