= Oseberg ship =

Preserved Viking ship

Coordinates: 59°54′18″N 10°41′04″E

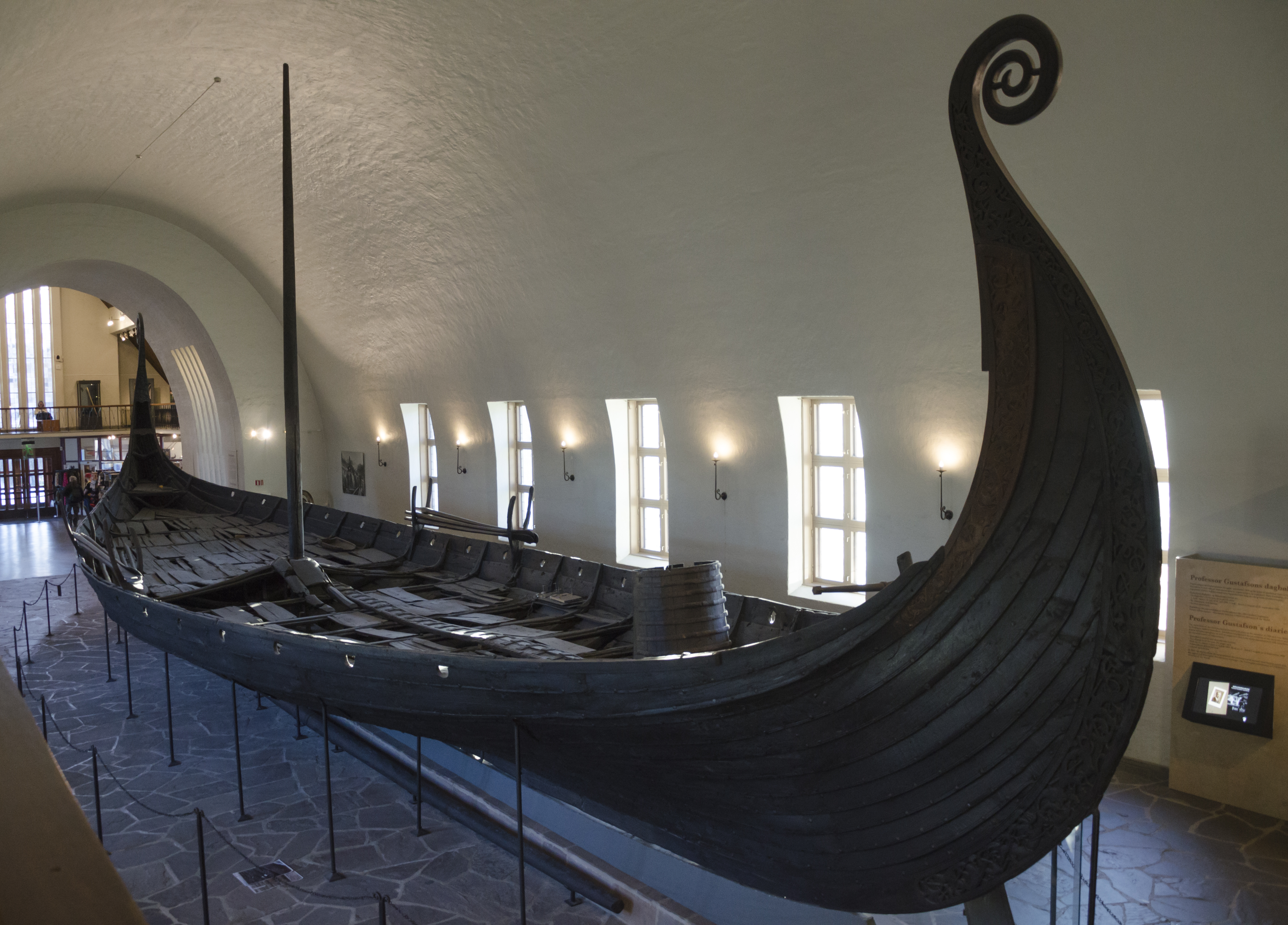
The Oseberg ship (Viking Ship Museum, Norway)

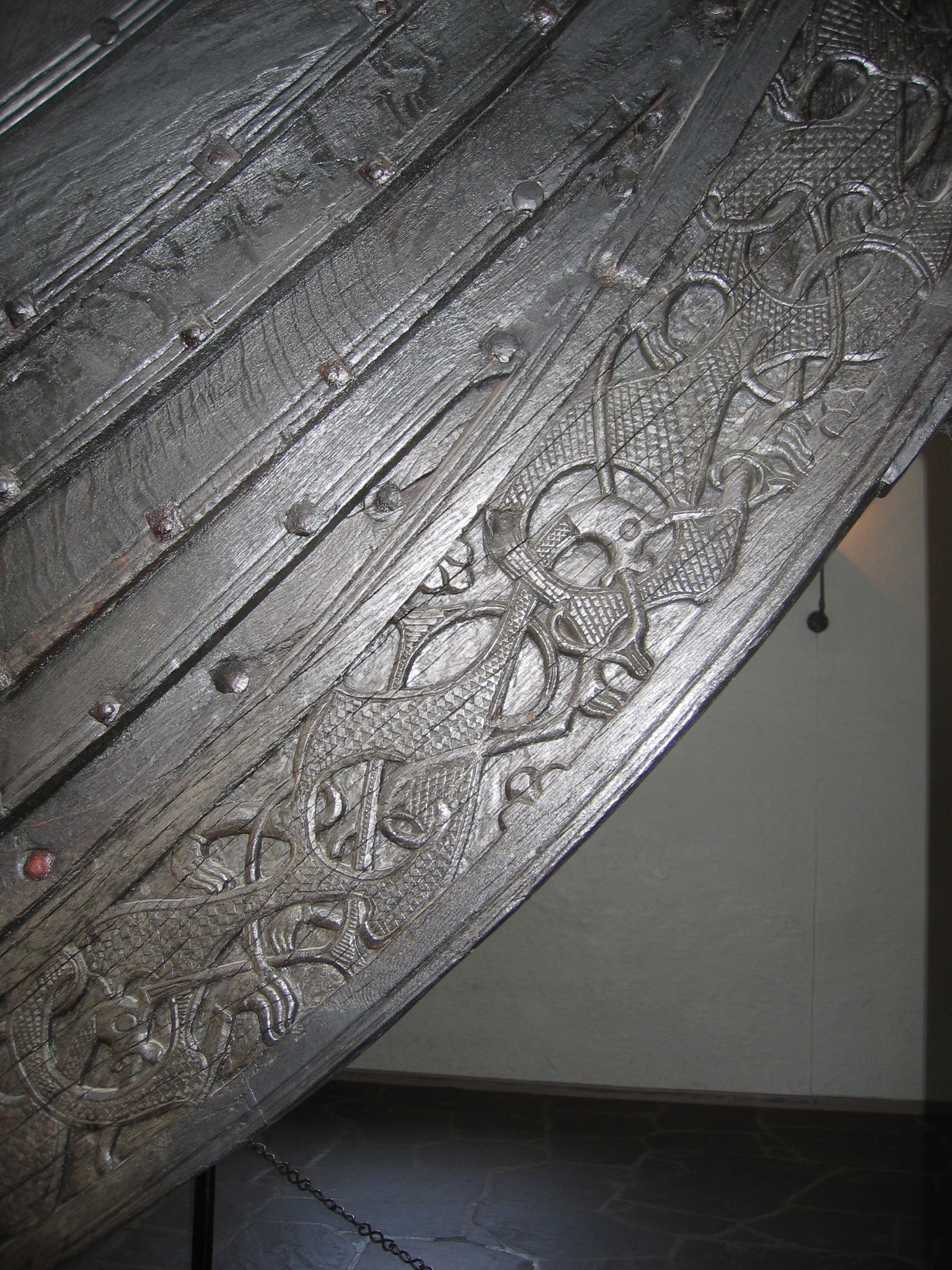
Detail from the Oseberg ship

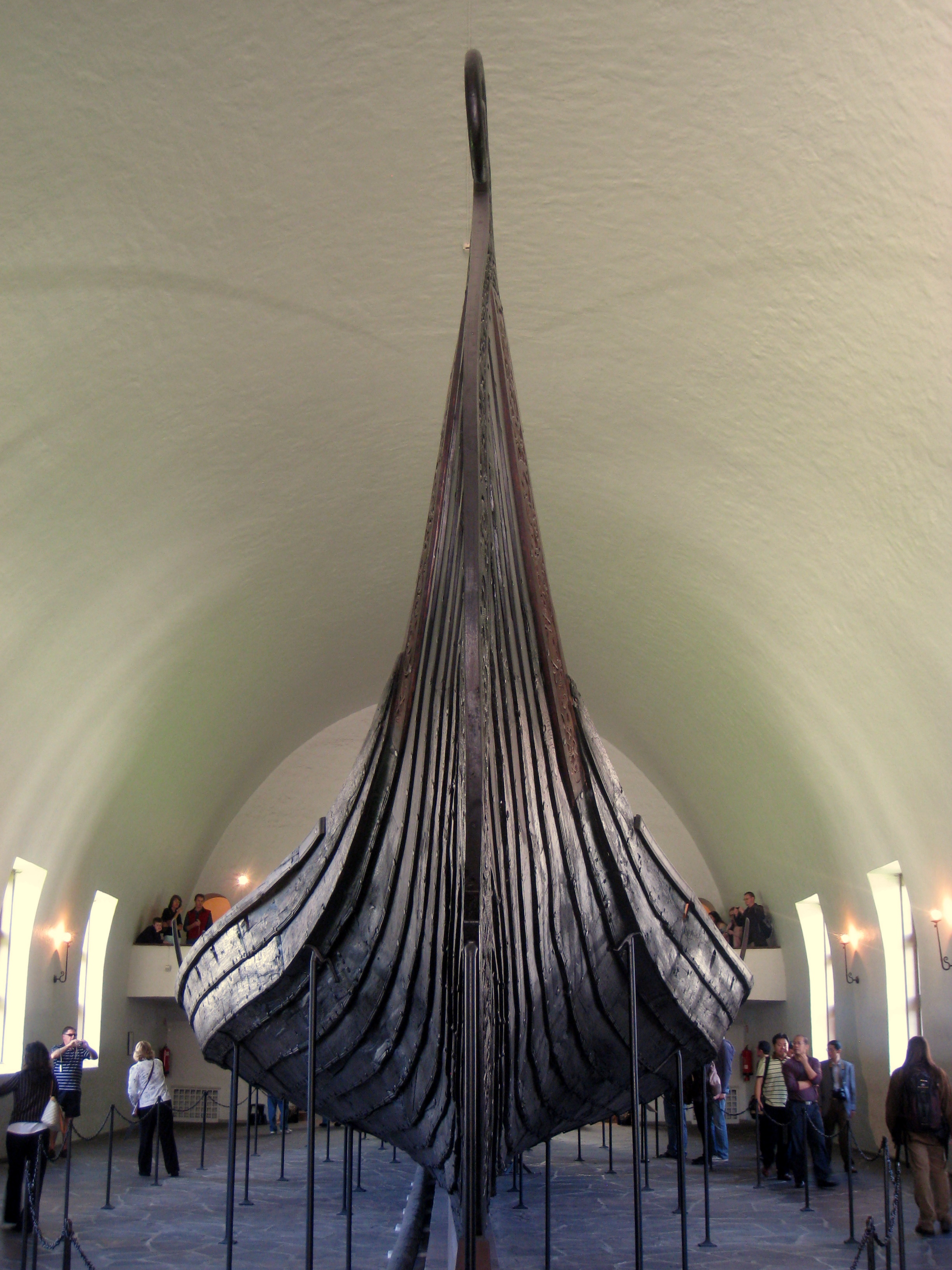
View from the front.

The Oseberg ship (Norwegian: Osebergskipet) is a well-preserved longship (probably a karve) discovered in a large burial mound at the Oseberg farm near Tønsberg in Vestfold county, Norway. This ship is commonly acknowledged to be among the finest artifacts to have survived from the Viking Age. The ship and some of its contents are displayed at the Viking Ship Museum at Bygdøy on the western side of Oslo, Norway.

Excavation of the ship from the Oseberg burial mound (Norwegian: Oseberghaugen ved Slagen from the Old Norse word haugr meaning kurgan mound or barrow) was undertaken by Swedish archaeologist Gabriel Gustafson and Norwegian archaeologist Haakon Shetelig in 1904–1905. The grave also contained two female human skeletons as well as a considerable number of grave goods. Scientific dating of the ship suggests it was buried no earlier than 834, although certain parts of its structure date from as early as 800, while other parts may be even older.

== Structure ==
The ship is a Karve, clinker built, almost entirely of oak. It is 21.58 metres (70.8 ft) in length and 5.10 metres (16.7 ft) broad, with a mast of approximately 9–10 metres (30–33 ft) in height. With a likely sail area of 90 square metres (970 sq ft), the ship could have achieved a speed of up to 10 knots (19 km/h; 12 mph). The ship has 15 pairs of openings for oars, enabling up to 30 people to row it. Other fittings include a broad steering oar, iron anchor, gangplank, and a bailer. The bow and stern of the ship are elaborately decorated with complex woodcarvings in the characteristic "gripping beast" style, also known as the Oseberg style.

During the debate on whether to move the original ship to a proposed new museum, thorough investigations were made into the feasibility of moving the ship without damaging it. As part of that process, highly detailed photographic and laser scans of both the exterior and interior of the ship were made.

== Replica ==
In 2004, an attempt to build a copy of the Oseberg ship was launched. A collective effort of Norwegian and Danish professional builders, scientists and volunteers engaged in this new attempt with the photo and laser scans made available free of charge to the builders. During this new attempt, it was discovered that during the initial restoration of the ship a breach in some of the beams had been made and that the ship was therefore inadvertently altered, a fact that had not been appreciated earlier. This may be why an earlier replica, the Dronningen, sank; this previous attempt had failed owing to a lack of this knowledge.

In 2010, a new reconstruction project called Saga Oseberg was started. Using timber from Denmark and Norway and utilizing traditional building methods from the Viking Age, this newest Oseberg ship was successfully completed. The new ship was launched from the city of Tønsberg on 20 June 2012. The ship floated very well and in March 2014 it was sailed on the open seas, with Færder as its destination; the ship performed very well, achieving a speed of 10 knots under full sail. The reconstruction was thus a success and demonstrated that the Oseberg ship really could have sailed and was not just a burial chamber on land.

== Human remains ==
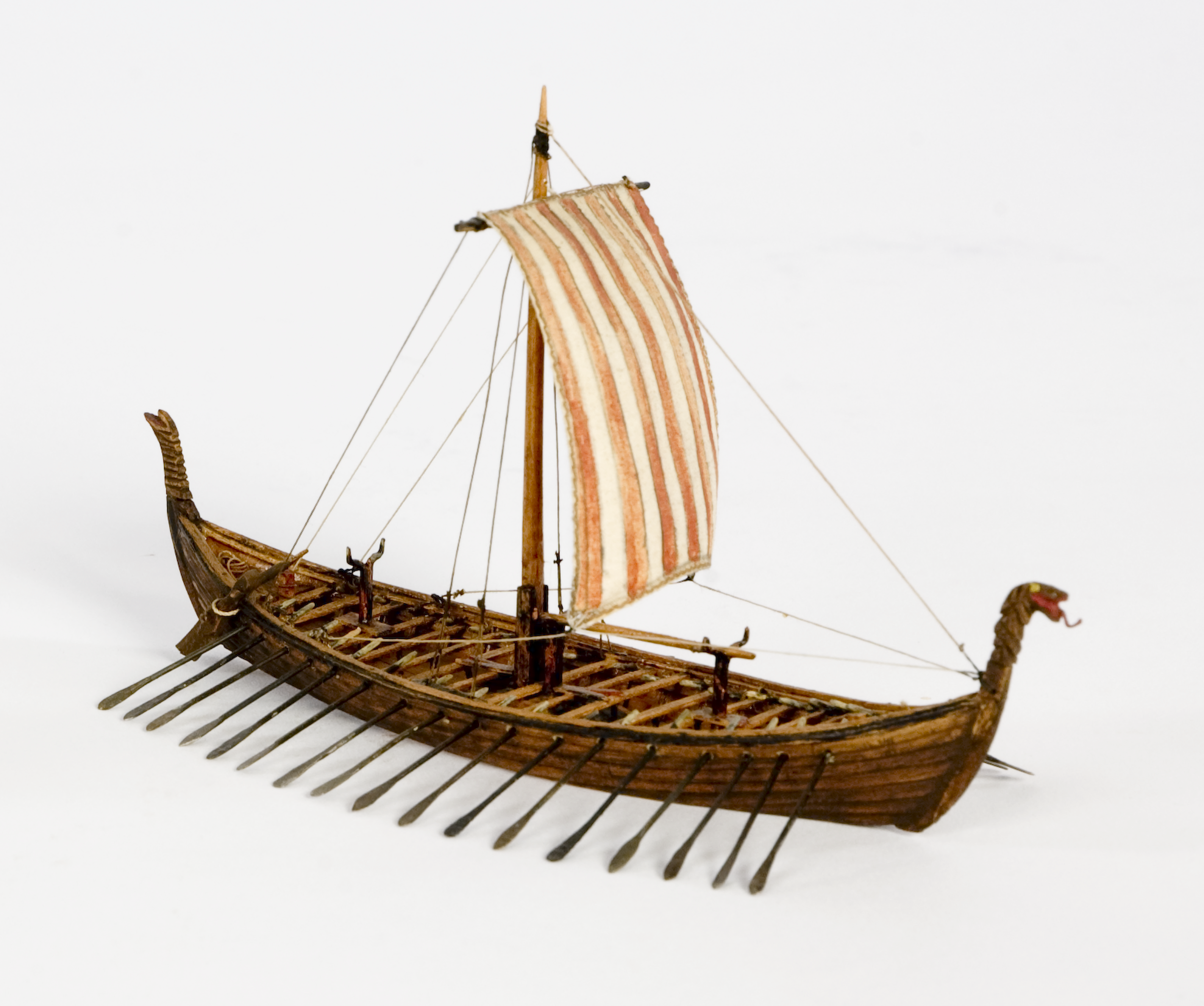
Model of the Oseberg Ship in the Maritime Museum, Stockholm, Sweden.

The skeletons of two women were found in the grave with the ship. One, probably aged around 80, suffered badly from arthritis. The older woman also had Morgagni's syndrome, which would have given her a masculine appearance and beard. The second was initially believed to be aged 25–30, but analysis of tooth-root translucency suggests she was older (aged 50–55). It is not clear what stations the women occupied in life, or whether one was sacrificed to accompany the other in death. The younger woman had a broken collarbone, initially thought to be evidence that she was a human sacrifice, but closer examination showed that the bone had been healing for several weeks. The opulence of the burial rite and the grave-goods suggests that this was a burial of very high status. One woman wore a very fine red wool dress with a lozenge twill pattern (a luxury commodity) and a fine white linen veil in a gauze weave, while the other wore a plainer blue wool dress with a wool veil, possibly showing some stratification in their social status. Neither woman wore anything entirely made of silk, although small silk strips were appliqued onto a tunic worn under the red dress.

Dendrochronological analysis of timbers in the grave chamber dates the burial to the autumn of 834. Although the high-ranking woman's identity is unknown, it has been suggested that she is Queen Åsa of the Yngling clan, mother of Halfdan the Black and grandmother of Harald Fairhair. Recent tests of the women's remains suggest that they lived in Agder in Norway, as had Queen Åsa. This theory has been challenged, however, and some think that she may have been a shaman. There were also the skeletal remains of 14 horses, an ox, and three dogs found on the ship.

According to Per Holck of the University of Oslo, the younger woman's mitochondrial haplogroup was discovered to be U7. Her direct maternal ancestors came to Norway from the Pontic littoral, probably Iran. Three subsequent studies failed to confirm these results, however, and it is likely that the bone samples contain little (if any) original DNA or have been contaminated through handling.

Examinations of fragments of the skeletons have provided more insight into their lives. The younger woman's teeth showed signs that she used a metal toothpick, a rare 9th century luxury. Both women had a diet composed mainly of meat, another luxury when most Vikings ate fish. However, there was not enough DNA to tell if they were related.

The women were found together in one bed.

== Grave goods ==
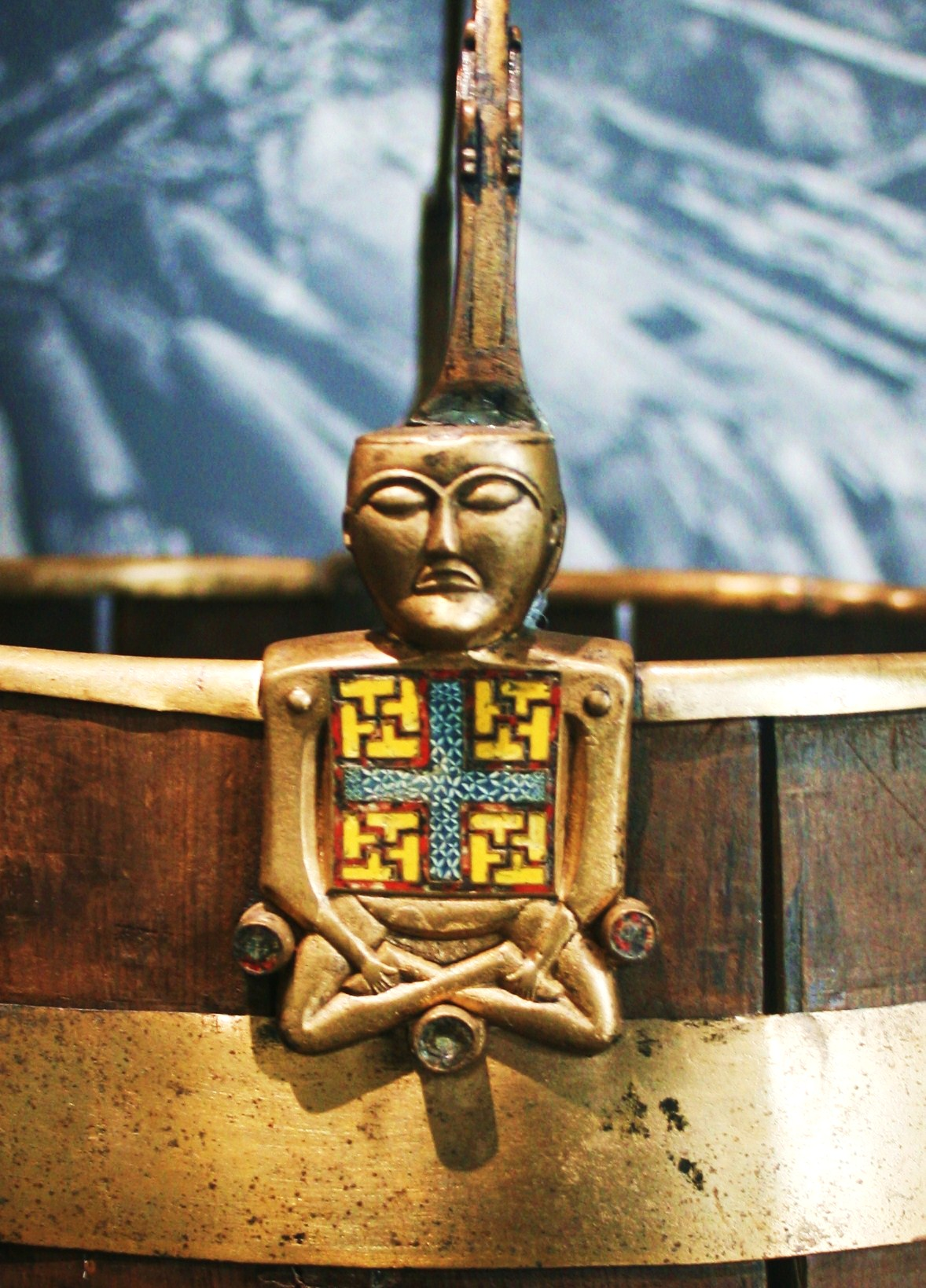
The so-called "Buddha bucket" (Buddha-bøtte), a brass and cloisonné enamel ornament of a bucket (pail) handle in the shape of a figure sitting with crossed legs.

The grave had been disturbed in antiquity, and objects made of precious metals were absent. Nevertheless, a great number of everyday items and artifacts were found during the 1904–1905 excavations. These included four elaborately decorated sleighs, a richly carved four-wheel wooden cart, bed-posts, and wooden chests, as well as the so-called "Buddha bucket" (Buddha-bøtte), a brass and cloisonné enamel ornament of a bucket (pail) handle in the shape of a figure sitting with crossed legs. The bucket is made from yew wood, held together with brass strips, and the handle is attached to two anthropomorphic figures compared to depictions of the Buddha in the lotus posture, although any connection is most uncertain. More relevant is the connection between the patterned enamel torso and similar human figures in the Gospel books of the Insular art of Ireland, such as the Book of Durrow. More mundane items such as agricultural and household tools were also found. A series of textiles included woolen garments, imported silks, and narrow tapestries. The Oseberg burial is one of the few sources of Viking Age textiles, and the wooden cart is the only complete Viking Age cart found so far. A bedpost shows one of the few period examples of the use of what has been dubbed the valknut symbol.

The conservation of the wooden artifacts is an ongoing problem. On May 3, 2011, thirteen years after debate began over the disposition of the ship, Norwegian Minister of Education Kristin Halvorsen stated that the ship will not be moved from Bygdøy.

== Gallery ==
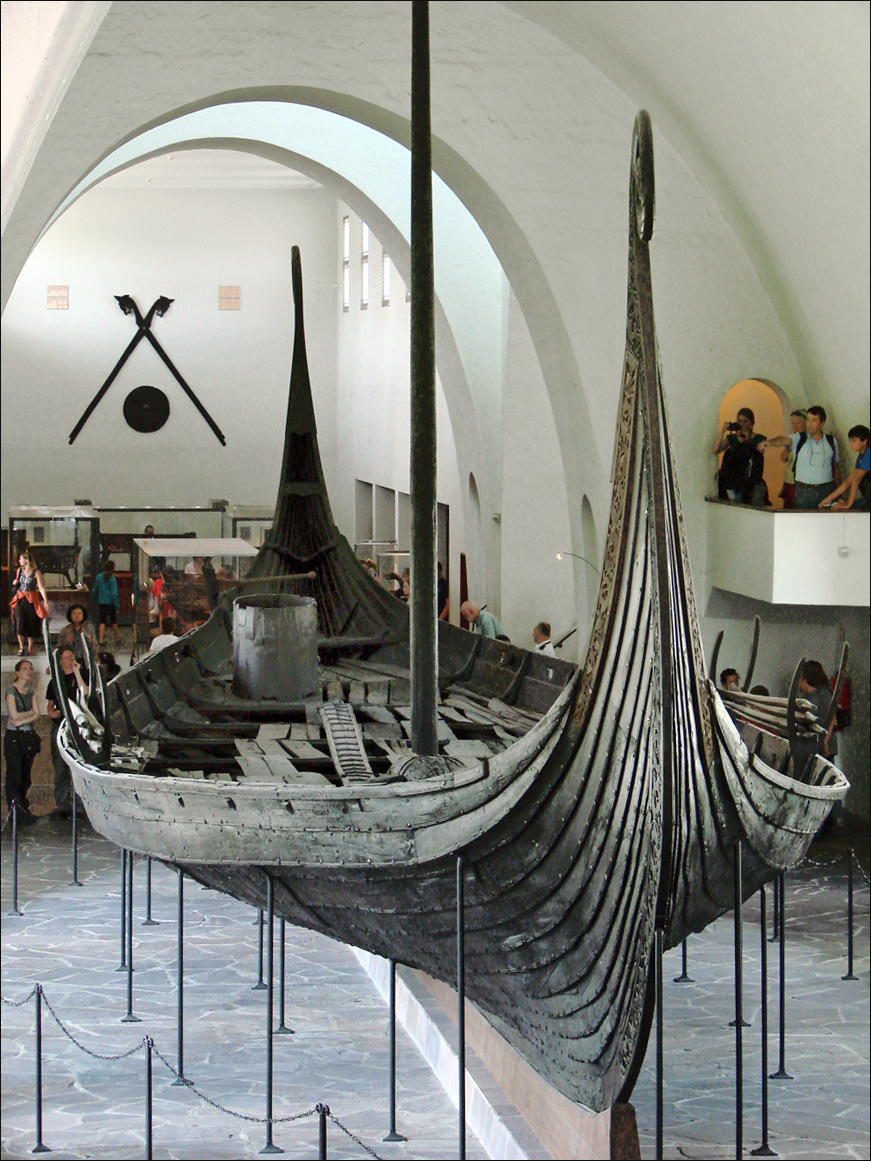
The Oseberg ship (Viking Ship Museum, Norway).

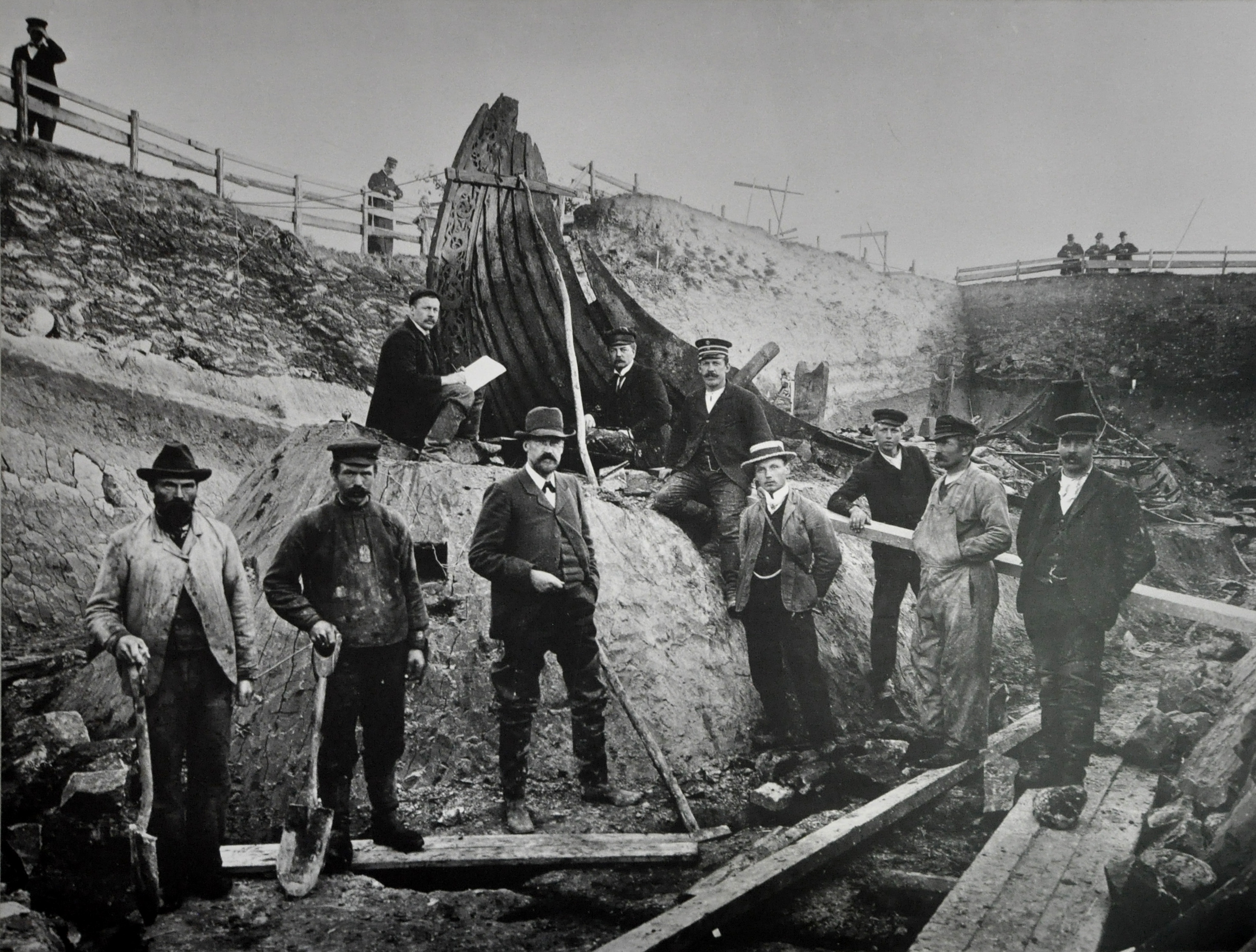
Excavation of the Oseberg ship, 1904/5.

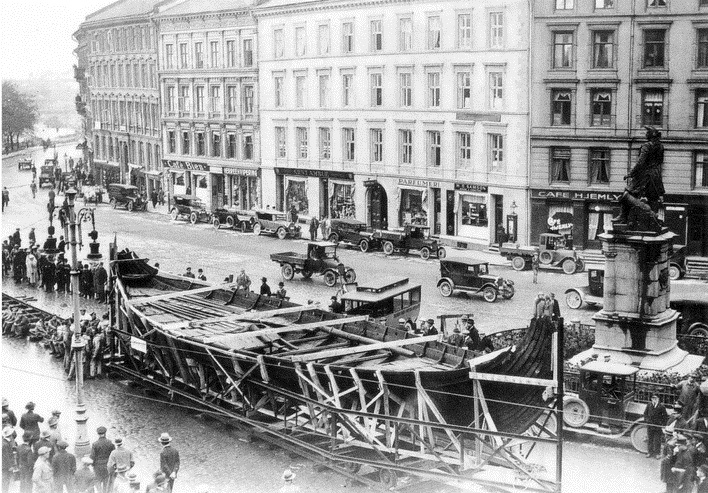
Moving the ship on rails to its current location at Bygdøy, September 1926.

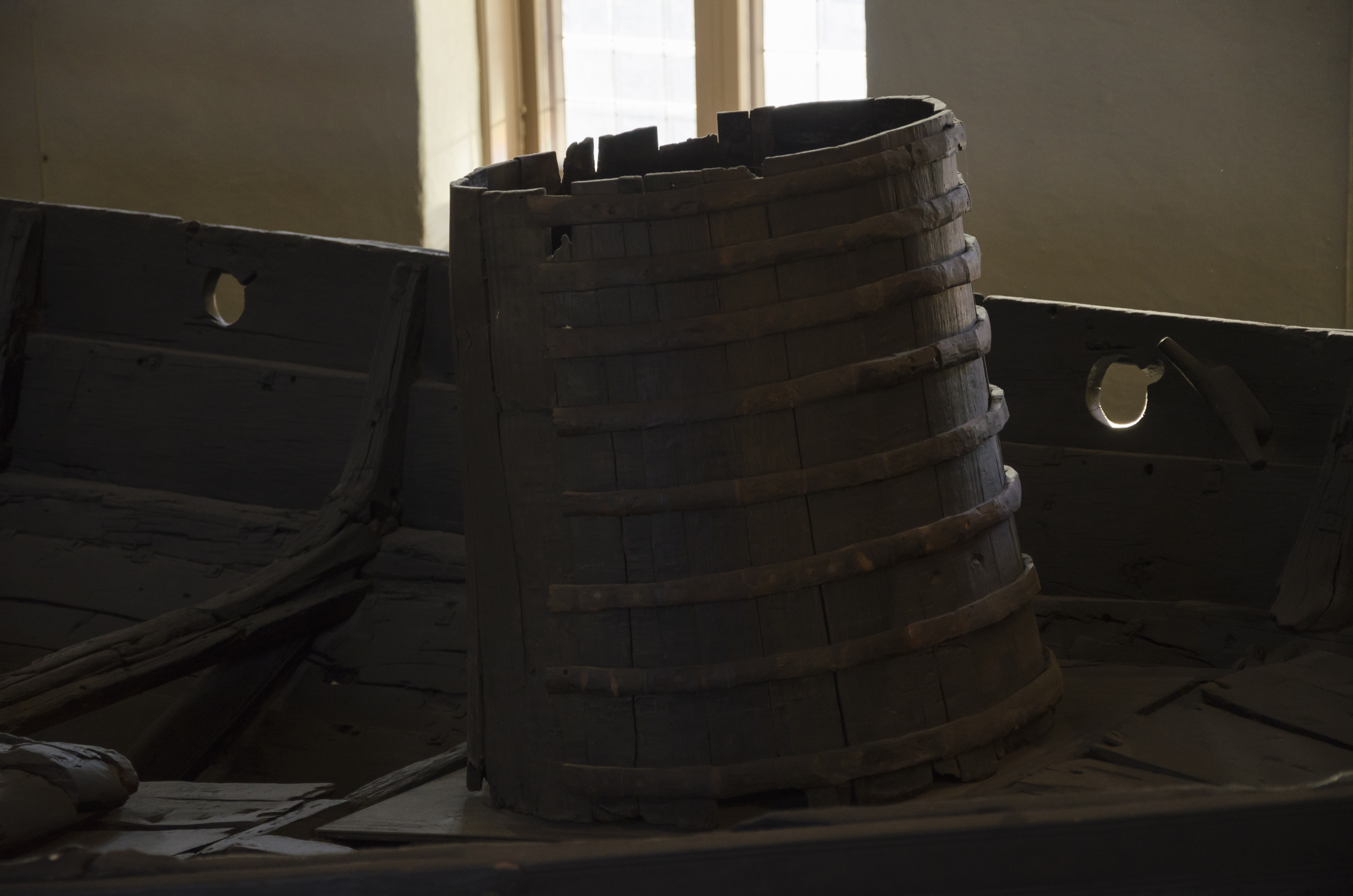
Barrel in the Oseberg ship.

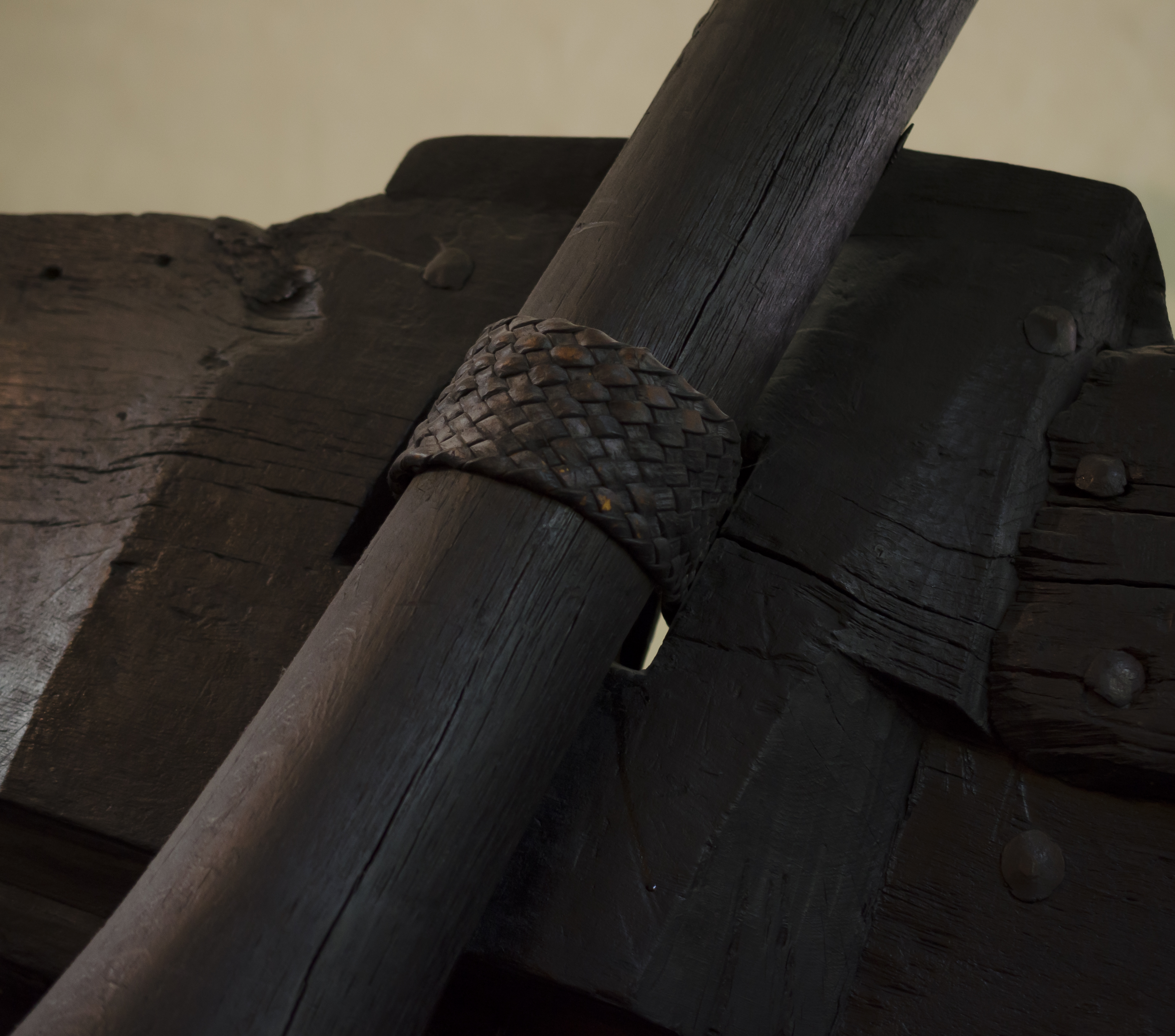
Part of the rudder, or "steering board" (hence the term "starboard") of the ship.

== Film ==
- Outlander (2008): a ship in the movie is based on the Oseberg ship
- Ragnarok (2013): secrets behind Ragnarok are discovered using the artifacts found in the Oseberg Ship

== See also ==
- Ship burial
- Oseberg tapestry fragments

Norway

- Gokstad ship, Vestfold
- Tune ship, Østfold
- Gjellestad ship

England

- Snape Anglo-Saxon Cemetery, Suffolk
- Sutton Hoo, Suffolk

Denmark

- Viking Ship Museum (Roskilde)

== Works cited ==
- Christensen, A. E. Ingstad, A. S. and Myhre, B. (1992) "Oseberg Dronningens Grav – Vår Arkeologiske Nasjonalskatt i Nytt Lys", Oslo
- Durham, Keith. Noon, Steve. (2002). Viking Longship Osprey Publishing ISBN 1-84176-349-7
- Doyle, Alister (Apr 25, 2008). Vikings acquitted in 100-year-old murder mystery. Reuters.
- Hagen, Anders (1968) The Viking Ship Finds: The Oseberg, Gokstad, and Tune Ships (Universitetets Oldsaksamling)
- Shetelig, Haakon; A.W. Brøgger (1950) Vikingeskipene (Oslo: Dreyer)
- Shetelig, Haakon (1928) Queen Asa's Sculptors: Wood Carvings found in the Oseberg Ship, Norway (London: Burlington House)
- Sjovold, Thorleif (1969) The Oseberg Find and the Other Viking Ship Finds Mary Fjeld Sjovold, translation (Universitetets Oldsaksamling)
- Sjovold, Thorleif (1954) The Viking Ships – A Short Description of the Tune, Gorstad and Oseberg Ships (Dreyers Forlag)
