= Haakon Shetelig =

Norwegian archaeologist, historian and museum director

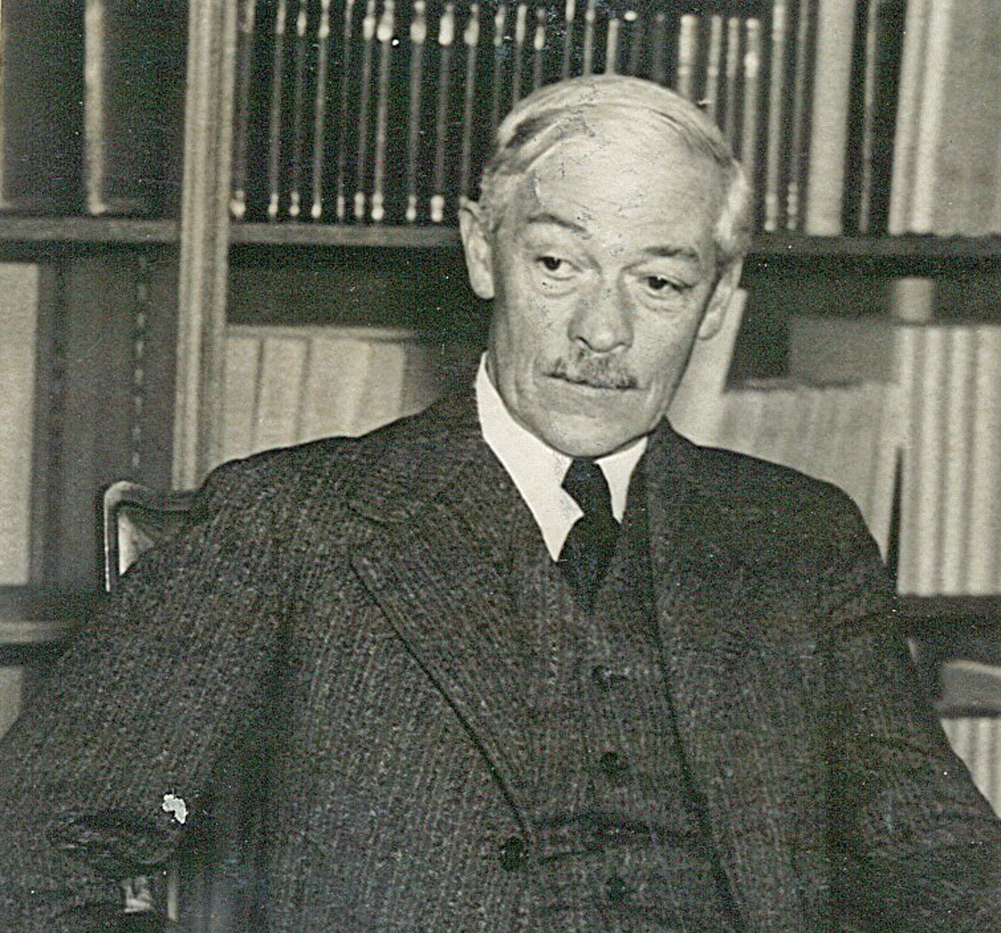
Haakon Shetelig c. 1940

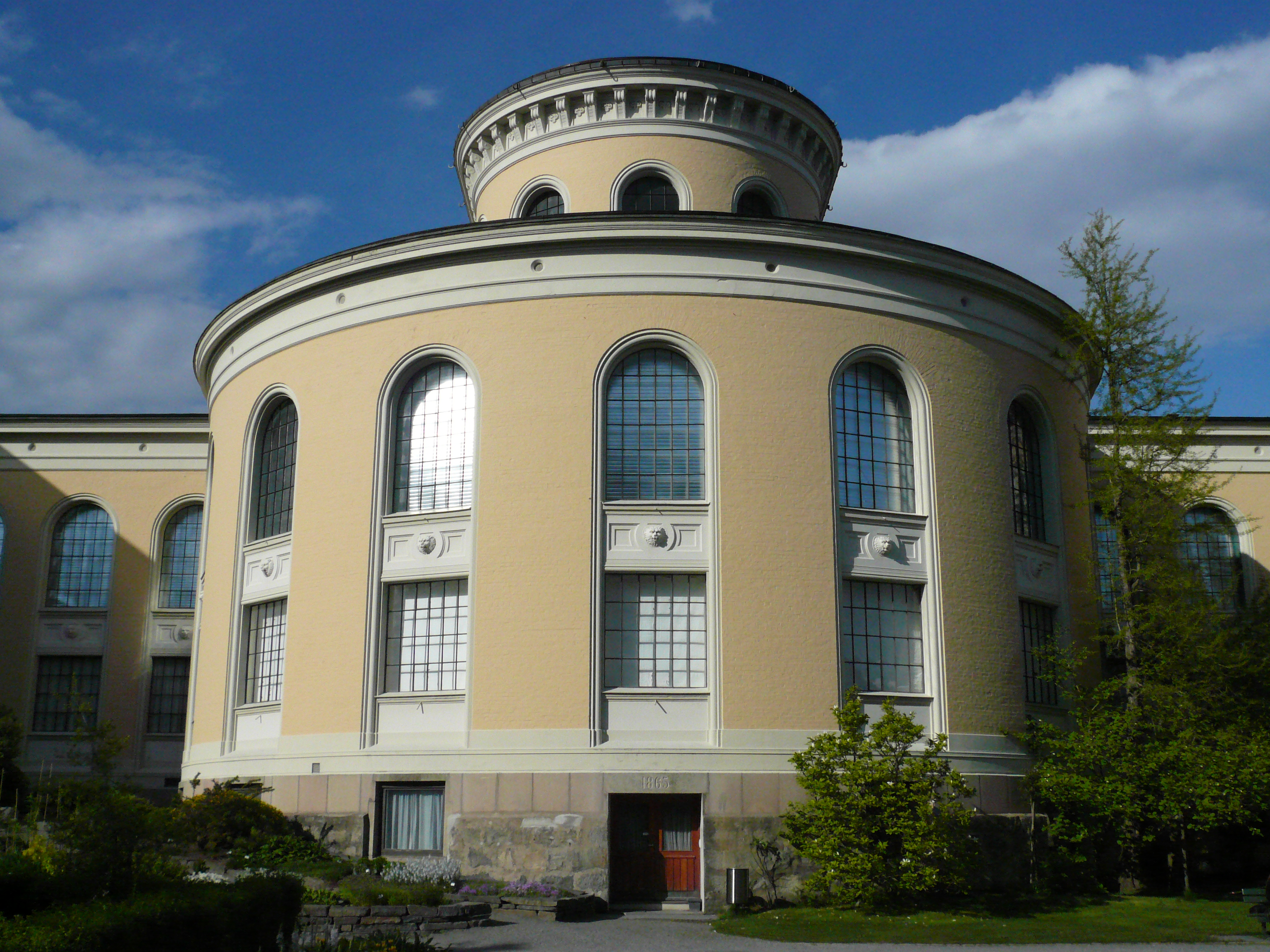
Bergen Museum of Natural History

Haakon Shetelig (June 25, 1877 – July 22, 1955) was a Norwegian archaeologist, historian and museum director. He was a pioneer in archaeology known for his study of art from the Viking Age in Norway. He is most frequently associated with his work on the Oseberg ship (Osebergfunnet) near Tønsberg, Norway.

== Biography ==
Haakon Shetelig grew up in Christiania (now Oslo, Norway). He was the son of Harald Fredrik Schetelig (1846–1918) and Magnhild Pedersen (1850–1920), and the nephew of Tord Pedersen. He and studied classical languages and Old Norse philology and history at the University of Christiania (now the University of Oslo). In 1901, Shetelig was hired as curator and manager of the historical-antiquarian part of the Bergen Museum, the University of Bergen museum in Bergen, Norway. He was appointed professor in 1914 and worked as director of the History and Antiquarian Department until 1942.

Shetelig and his colleague, Swedish archaeologist Gabriel Gustafson, led the team that dug out and preserved the Oseberg ship in 1904–1905. After Gustafson's death in 1915, he collaborated with archaeologist Anton Wilhelm Brøgger and Hjalmar Falk to publish the discovery. In 1920 he led the excavation of the Kvalsund ships (Kvalsundskipet), which were found at the Kvalsund farm in Herøy Municipality in 1920.

In 1910 he founded the magazine Kunst og Kultur with Harry Fett, which he edited (1910–1927). He published a number of papers and writings about archaeology, history, and cultural history. He also wrote the first volume of the six-volume series Viking Antiquities in Great Britain and Ireland, for which he also served as the main editor. He introduced the Shetelig axiom, which refers to the idea that the Viking age began when Scandinavian Vikings attacked Lindisfarne in 793.

Haakon Shetelig was a member of the Norwegian Academy of Science and Letters and the Royal Norwegian Scientific Society. He was appointed Commander of the Order of St. Olav in 1946 and held several foreign orders and medals.

== Selected works ==
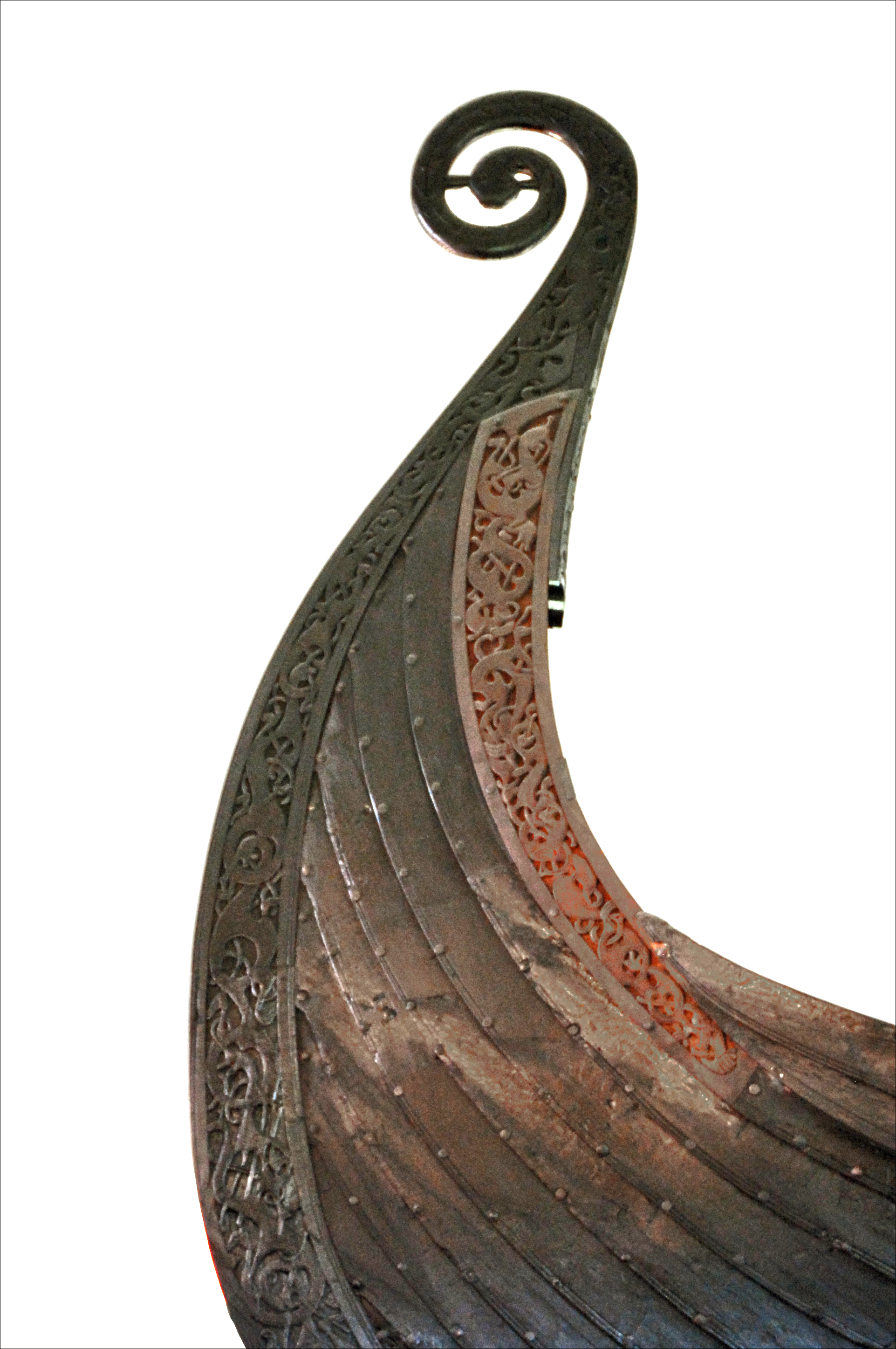
Stern of the Oseberg ship

- Spandformede lerkar fra folkevandringstiden (1904)
- Smaa bronsespænder fra folkevandringstiden (1910)
- Vestlandske graver fra jernalderen (1912)
- Bergen 1814-1914, with Carl Geelmuyden (1914)
- Oseberg-funnet 1, with Anton Wilhelm Brøgger and Hjalmar Falk (1917)
- Primitive tider i Norge. En oversigt over stenalderen (1922)
- Prehistoire De La Norvzge (1926)
- Oseberg-funnet 2, with Anton Wilhelm Brøgger and Hjalmar Falk (1928)
- Vikingeminner I Vest-Europa (1933)
- Scandinavian Archaeology, with Hjalmar Falk (1937)
- Viking Antiquities of Great Britain and Ireland, with A. Bjørn (1940)
- Foreningen til norske fortidsminnesmerkers bevaring 1844–1944 (1944)
- Norske museers historie (1944)
- Vikingeskipene: Deres Forgjengere Og Etterfolgere, with Anton Wilhelm Brøgger (1950)

== Other sources ==
- Hovland, Kari Shetelig (1995) Haakon Shetelig: Arkeologen og mennesket (Alma mater) ISBN 978-82-419-0166-9
- Hartvedt, Gunnar Hagen (1994) Bergen Byleksikon (Oslo: Kunnskapsforlaget) ISBN 82-573-0485-9.
