= Gro Steinsland =

Norwegian scholar

Gro Steinsland (born 1945) is a Norwegian scholar of medieval studies and history of religion and since August 2009 has been the Scientific Director of the Centre for Advanced Study at the Norwegian Academy of Science and Letters.

Steinsland has most recently been a professor in the Institute for Linguistic and Nordic Studies at the University of Oslo, where she was also a member of the international interdepartmental Centre for Studies in the Viking Age and Nordic Middle Ages from its founding in 1993 until its dissolution. She taught in the Institute for Religious Studies at the University of Tromsø and has held guest faculty positions at Linacre College, Oxford University and at the University of Bonn. In 2007-08, she led the international interdisciplinary research group in "The Power of the Ruler and the Ideology of Rulership in Nordic Culture 800-1200" at the Centre for Advanced Study of the Norwegian Academy of Science and Letters, and, since 1 August 2009, has been its Scientific Director.

Steinsland specialises in pre-Christian religion, the associated Old Norse texts and mythology and the conversion of Scandinavia. At both Oslo and Tromsø, she made Norse religion a main subject within the history of religion programme. She is a member of the group for theology and religious studies in the Academy of Science and Letters. As a historian of religion, her publications take Norse paganism seriously and present it in a non-traditional light as having been still strong and vital when it encountered Christianity. In 2005, she published a wideranging introductory book, Norrøn religion (Norse religion), which presents the subject from the perspective of myth and praxis.

In her 1989 Ph.D. dissertation, Det hellige bryllup og norrøn kongeideologi: en analyse av hierogami-myten i Skírnismál, Ynglingatal, Háleygjatal og Hyndluljód (the sacred marriage and Norse ideology of kingship: an analysis of the myth of the hieros gamos in Skírnismál, Ynglingatal, Háleygjatal and Hyndluljóð), she reinterpreted the sacred marriage between a god and a giantess as a power myth legitimising rulership rather than a fertility myth; she specialises in the interpretation of written sources but made extensive use of archaeology and frequently takes an interdisciplinary approach. She emphasised the female aspect of pre-Christian religion, particularly in her 1997 book Eros og død i norrøne myter (Eros and death in Norse myths), in which she contrasts the sexualisation of death in, for example, references to drowning as being embraced by the sea goddess Rán with the post-conversion view of female sexuality as shameful.

Steinsland has written newspaper opinion articles, for example in 2000 taking the position that Thor Heyerdahl's Odin expedition to Azerbaijan was inspired by a conjectural "charade" orchestrated by Snorri Sturluson.

== Selected publications ==
- Det hellige bryllup og norrøn kongeideologi: en analyse av hierogami-myten i Skírnismál, Ynglingatal, Háleygjatal og Hyndluljód. Oslo: Solum, 1991. ISBN 82-560-0764-8. Doctoral dissertation, University of Oslo, 1989.
- (with Preben Meulengracht Sørensen) Før kristendommen: digtning og livssyn i vikingetiden Copenhagen: Gyldendal, 1990. ISBN 87-00-79194-6
- (with Preben Meulengracht Sørensen) Menneske og makter i vikingenes verden Oslo: Universitetsforlaget, 1994. ISBN 82-00-21316-1
- Eros og død i norrøne myter. Oslo: Universitetsforlaget, 1997. ISBN 82-00-22938-6
- (with Preben Meulengracht Sørensen) Voluspå, Gjendiktning og kommentar. Oslo: Pax, 1999. ISBN 82-530-2136-4
- Den hellige kongen; om religion og herskermakt fra vikingtid til middelalder. Oslo: Pax, 2000. ISBN 82-530-2227-1
- (with Magnus Rindal) Heilage stader i Norge. Oslo: Det Norske samlaget, 2001. ISBN 82-521-5657-6
- Norrøn religion: Myter, riter, samfunn. Oslo: Pax, 2005. ISBN 82-530-2607-2
- (Ed.) Words and Objects: Towards a Dialogue Between Archaeology and History of Religion. (Conference proceedings) Instituttet for sammenlignende kulturforskning Serie B-Skrifter 71. Oslo: Norwegian University Press / Oxford/New York: Oxford University, 1984. ISBN 82-00-07751-9
- (Ed.) Voluspå, og andre norrøne helligtekster. Verdens hellige skrifter. Oslo: De norske Bokklubbene, 2003. ISBN 82-525-4113-5
- (Ed.) Draumkvedet, og tekster fra norrøn middelalder. Verdens hellige skrifter. Oslo: De norske Bokklubbene, 2004. ISBN 82-525-4627-7
