= Anders Hagen =

Norwegian archaeologist (1921–2005)

- Born: 15 May 1921; Vang, Hedmark, Norway
- Died: 15 July 2005 (aged 84); Bergen, Vestland, Norway
- Education: University of Oslo (PhD)
- Spouse: Sigrid Hjelmaas (m. 1946)

Anders Hagen (15 May 1921 – 15 July 2005) was a Norwegian archaeologist. Hagen was most associated with the study of Norwegian archaeology and cultural heritage. He was a professor of Scandinavian Archaeology at University of Bergen and department head at the University Museum of Bergen.

== Biography ==
He was born in Vang in Hedmark, Norway. He finished his secondary education in Hamar in 1941. He enrolled in archaeology at the University of Oslo, and graduated with the mag.art. degree in 1945. In 1953 he published his thesis, Studier i jernalderens gårdssamfunn, which earned him the PhD degree in 1954. While in college, he worked as a conservator at the University of Oslo.

In 1961, he was appointed as professor of Scandinavian Archaeology, University of Bergen. He also managed the department of cultural history at University Museum of Bergen. Under Hagen's leadership, the University Historical Museum developed both as an educational institution and museum. From 1977 to 1980, he was the dean of the Faculty of Humanities at the University. He retired as a professor and department head, continuing as senior researcher until 1991.

Hagen published a large body of work, with research of considerable depth. He researched mainly Norwegian settlement history of the Stone Age and Bronze Age. Among his more notable works was Historiens røtter, released in 1982 as volume one of Cappelens verdenshistorie.

Hagen also served as leader of the Norwegian Society for the Conservation of Nature from 1963 to 1969 and Statens naturvernråd from 1970 to 1972. He was a member of Statens naturvernråd from 1967 to 1977 and Statens kulturminneråd from 1979 to 1996. He was decorated as a Knight First Class Royal Norwegian Order of St. Olav in 1989. He was inducted into the Norwegian Academy of Science and Letters in 1955.

== Personal life ==
In 1946 he married Sigrid Hjelmaas. He died in July 2005 in Bergen.

== Selected works ==
- Studier i jernalderens gårdssamfunn (1953)
- Norges oldtid (1967)
- Vikingskips Funnene (1969)
- Studier i vestnorsk bergkunst, Ausevik i Flora (1970)
- Bergkunst, Jegerfolkets helleristninger og malninger i norsk steinalder (1976)
- Festskrift til Anders Hagen (1988)
- Helleristninger i Norge (1990)
- Gåten om kong Raknes grav: hovedtrekk i norsk arkeologi (1997)
