= 1 kroon coin (1934) =

Estonian coin

1 kroon (1934)
- Estonia
- Value: 1
- Mass: 6 grams (0.21 ounces) g
- Diameter: 2.525 inches (64.1 millimetres) mm
- Edge: Smooth
- Composition: Cu92Al6Ni2
- Years of minting: 1934
- Catalog number: K16

Obverse
- Design: Coat of arms of Estonia
- Designer: Georg Vestenberg
- Design date: 1934

Reverse
- Design: Viking ship
- Designer: Günther Reindorff
- Design discontinued: 25 March 1941

The 1 kroon coin was put in circulation from 1 August 1934 to 25 March 1941, during the first independence period of Estonia. The exact number of coins minted is not known, as part of the archives was destroyed in the war, but some data indicate that about 3,406,066 pieces were struck. During the budget year of 1935/1936, 1,586,000 additional 1 kroon coins were minted. Designed by graphic artist Günther Reindorff, it depicts the image of a 13th-century Viking cargo ship.

== Monetary reform ==
With the Estonian monetary reform in January 1928 the law was changed as the Riigikogu had an amendment made to the law which stated that coins of 1 and 2 krooni could be minted in other metals, not only in silver as had been the case. As the silver coins of previous coinage had been too expensive, it was decided that this requirement would have to be eliminated. The corresponding change in the law came into effect on 24 March 1934.

As published by the Riigi Teataja, the Economics Department of the Ministry of Finance of the Republic of Estonia announced that the Money Amendment Act (RT 30 of 1933) §§ 4 and 5, allowed the Economics Department of the Ministry of Finance to put in circulation the one-kroon coin as of 1 August 1934. The shape, dimensions, hardness, and metal composition amended within the meaning of the Act remained as such according to the law, but had yet to be approved by the government.

On 25 November 1940, the Occupation of the Baltic states by the Soviet authorities put into circulation the ruble, and on 25 March 1941, three months before the outbreak of the war with the Third Reich, the Estonian crown was withdrawn from circulation. During the German (1941-1944) and Soviet (1944-1991) occupation of Estonia, foreign currency introduced by the occupiers remained in circulation.

== Designing ==
As in the case of the Estonian Mark, the Bank of Estonia announced a competition for the design of new banknotes and coins to be held on 4 June 1926. The competition was attended by many well-known artists of the period such as Eduard Wiiralt, Peet Aren, Roman Nyman, and Nikolai Triik. The winner was graphic artist Günther Reindorff, who had already designed the coins for the Estonian mark.

Coined in aluminum-bronze, the coin shows a golden color and weighs 6 grams (permissible error of ± 1%), has a diameter of 2.525 inches (± 0.5%), with value equivalent to 0.4032 grams of gold, being its edge smooth. The obverse of the coin bears in the center a large state seal, the coat of arms of Estonia, topped with an arc-shaped text which reads "Eesti Vabariik", and the year of issue "1934" at the bottom edge. The reverse depicts the Viking ship knarr (knorr) at sea, under which the inscription 1 kroon appears.

Coins with the same design were minted in 1990, but they are not legal tender, having been produced as souvenirs. One version is even less original, having a diameter of only 16 mm and on the front the inscription "Eesti" instead of "Eesti Vabariik". These coins are both made of gold as well as silver. Another re-issued version of the coin is about its original size, but the quality of the parts is much worse.

In 2012, the 1934 one-kroon coin was voted "the prettiest coin ever to be in circulation in Estonia".

== See also ==
- Eesti kroon
- Commemorative coins of Estonia
