= Viking ship replica =

Modern recreations of Viking Age ships

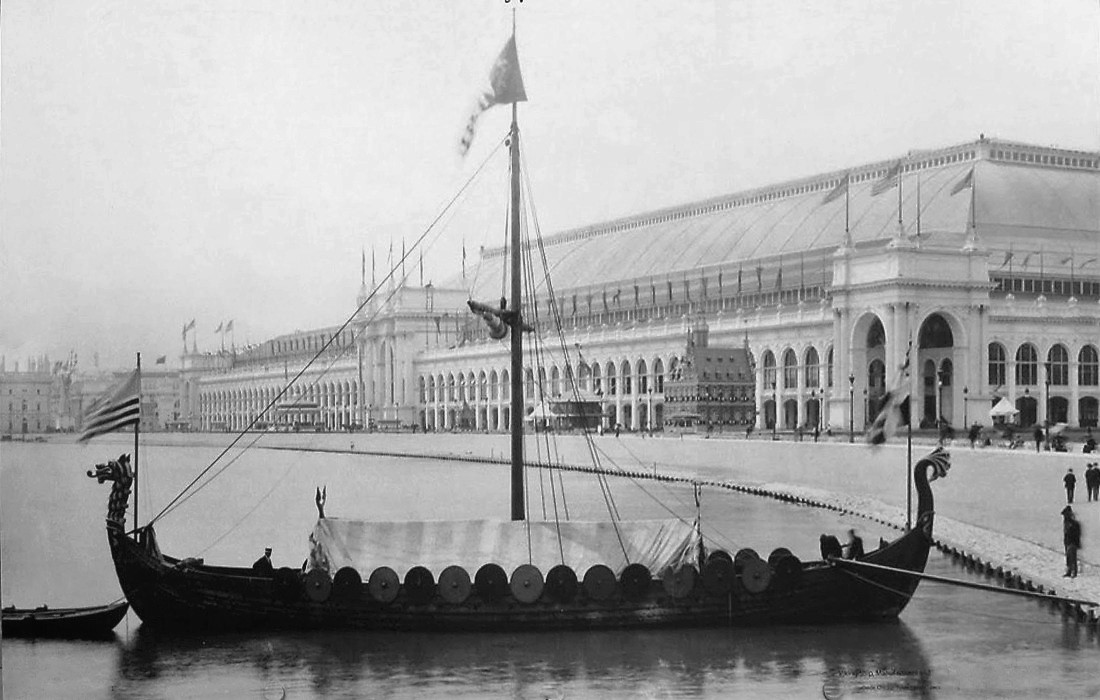
The Viking at the World's Columbian Exposition in Chicago, 1893

Viking ship replicas are one of the more common types of ship replica. Viking, the first Viking ship replica, was built by the Rødsverven shipyard in Sandefjord, Norway. In 1893 it sailed across the Atlantic Ocean to Chicago in the United States for the World's Columbian Exposition. Formerly located in Lincoln Park, Chicago, Illinois, the Viking is currently undergoing conservation in Geneva, Illinois, United States.

There are a considerable number of modern reconstructions of Viking Age ships in service around Northern Europe and North America. The Viking Ship Museum in Roskilde, Denmark, has been particularly prolific in building accurate reconstructions of archaeological finds in its collection.

== Europe ==
=== Denmark ===
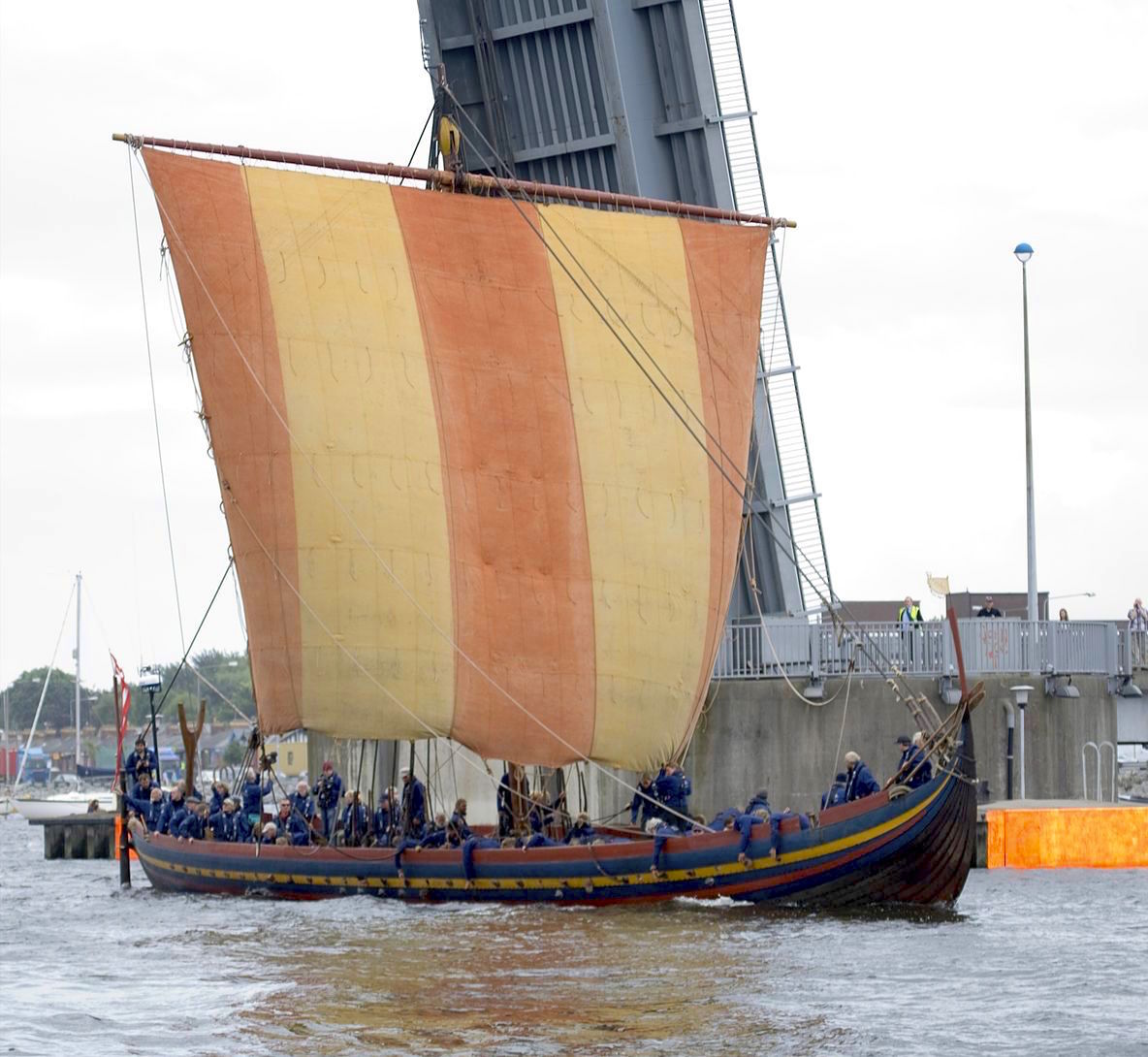
Havhingsten arriving in Dublin, Ireland

- Freja Byrding - Hejlsminde, Denmark (14 metres (46 ft), 5-8 persons, Skuldelev ships 3)
- Havhingsten fra Glendalough ("Sea Stallion from Glendalough") - Roskilde, Denmark, 2004 (30 metres (98 ft), 60-100 persons, Skuldelev ships 2)
- Heidrun - Skælskør
- Helge Ask - Roskilde, 1991 (17 metres (56 ft), 30 persons, Skuldelev ships 5)
- Imme Aros - Århus, 1969 (13.5 metres (44 ft), 30 persons, Ellingå ship of AD 1163, renamed Imme Struer 2003)
- Imme Gram - Tønder, 1963 (20 metres (66 ft), 32 persons, Ladby ship, lost 2009)
- Imme Sejr - Tønder, 2013 (21.5 metres (71 ft), 38 persons, Ladby ship)
- Kraka - Roskilde, 1971 (40 ft, 7-15 persons)
- Kraka Fyr - Roskilde, 1987 (12.2 metres (40 ft), 5-15 persons, Skuldelev ships 6)
- Ladbydragen - Vikingemuseet Ladby, Kerteminde, 2016 (21.5 metres (71 ft), 32 oars, Ladby ship)
- Lindheim Sunds - Ollerup, 1977 (17 metres (56 ft), 30 persons, Skuldelev ships 5)
- Nidhug - Lundby Strand, 1998 (16 metres (52 ft), 3-28 persons)
- Ottar - Roskilde, 2000 (15.84 metres (52.0 ft), 6-8 persons, Skuldelev ships 1)
- Randaros - Randers (39 ft)
- Roar Ege - Roskilde, 1985 (14 metres (46 ft), 5-8 persons, Skuldelev ships 3)
- Røskva - Skælskør
- Saga Siglar - Roskilde, 1983 (15.84 metres (52.0 ft), 6-8 persons, Skuldelev ships 1, sank off the Catalan coast in 1992)
- Sebbe Als - Augustenborg, Denmark, 1969 (17 metres (56 ft), 30 persons, Skuldelev ships 5)
- Sif Ege - Frederikssund, 1990 (14 metres (46 ft), 5-8 persons Skuldelev ships 3)

=== Estonia ===
- Turm - Tartu, Estonia, LOA=12 m, B=2.5 m, replica of Lapuri ship, built 2008-2009
- Aimar - Käsmu, Estonia, built 2009-2010, 1/2 size replica of Gokstad ship, LOA 10m, Beam 2m, 8 oars
- Thule and Neyve - Nõva, Läänemaa, Estonia, built 2010-2011, 1/4 replica of Gokstad ship, LOA 6,7m Beam 1,7m and 4 oars
- Äge - Kiruvere, Estonia, LOA=11.6m, B=2,8m, 12 oars, built 2011-2012, replica of Foteviken 1(Fotevikens Museum)
- Hüljes - Karja, Estonia, built 2017-2018, replica of the smallest boat from Gokstad find - faering. LOA 6,5m Beam 1,6m, 4 oars

=== France ===
- Dreknor - Cherbourg, Normandy, France
- Gungnir - Puiselet-Saint-Pierre-lès-Nemours

=== Iceland ===
- Íslendingur - Iceland (22.5 m, 9 persons) housed at the Viking World Museum
- Vésteinn - Iceland (LOA 12m, Beam 2,7m, 14 oars, 1/2 Gokstad ship replica built 2008 in Thingeyri, Westfjords)

=== Norway ===
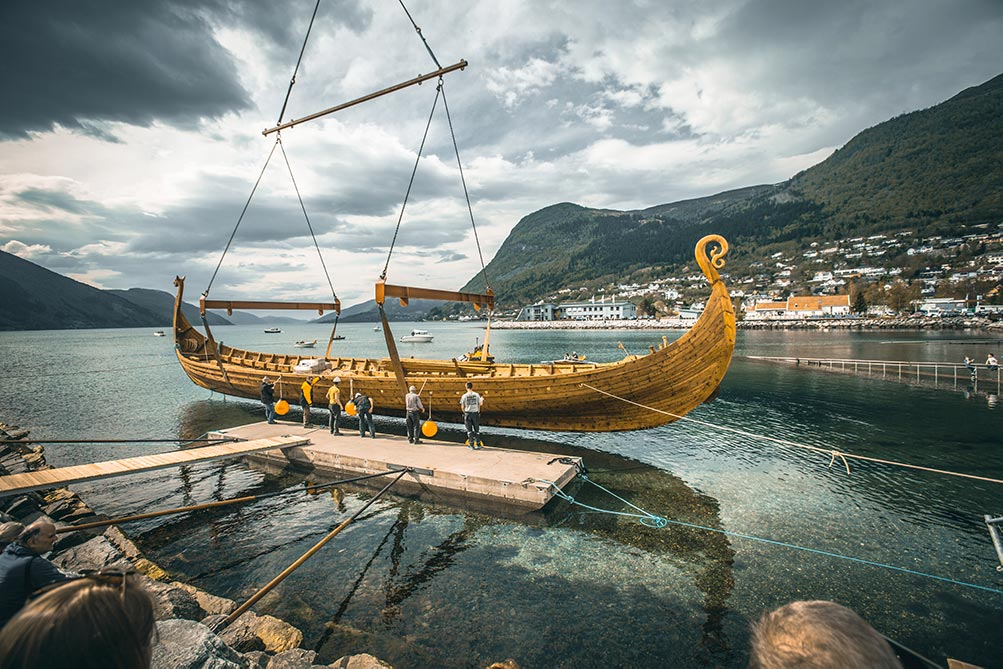
Myklebust Ship

- Myklebust ship - Nordfjordeid, 2019. Replica of the largest found Viking ship in the Myklebust Burial Mound.
- Draken Harald Hårfagre ("Dragon Harald Fairhair") - Haugesund, 2012 (35 metres (115 ft), 100 persons)
- Dronningen - Bjørkedalen, 1987 (replica of Oseberg ship)
- Gaia ship - Sandefjord

=== Sweden ===
- Ormen Friske ("Healthy Serpent") - Trosa, 1949 (23 metres (75 ft), 12-70 persons, Gokstad ship, lost 1950)
- Krampmacken - Gotland, 1980 (8 meters, replica of the Bulverket ship)
- Vidfamne - Gothenburg, 1994 (16 metres, replica of the Äskekärr ship)

=== UK ===
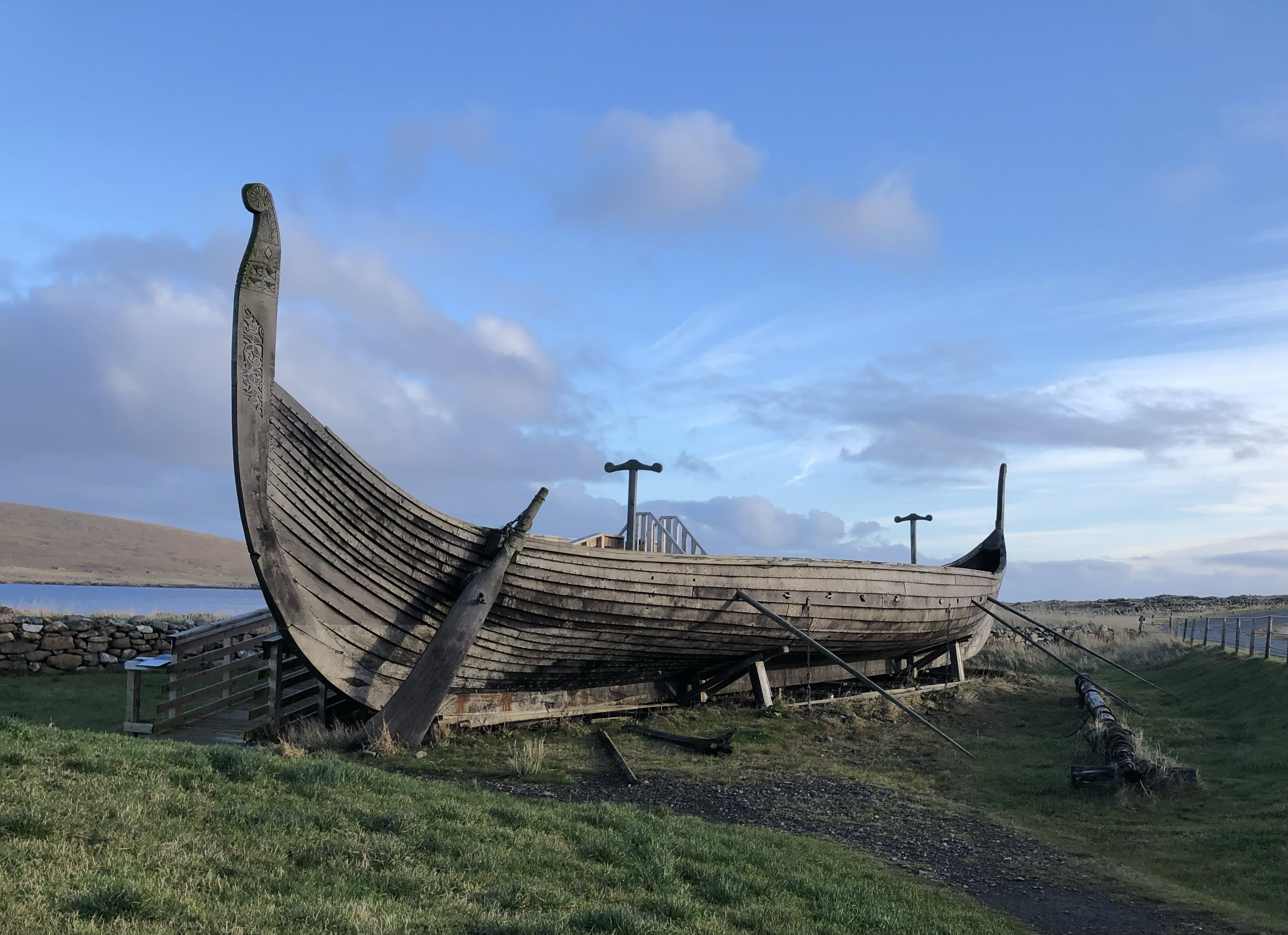
Skidbladner set sail from Sweden for America, but only made it as far as Shetland.

- Hugin - located at Pegwell Bay in Ramsgate, Kent. Built Denmark 1949 as replica of Gokstad ship.
- Odin's Raven - 50 feet (15 m) 2/3 scale replica of the Gokstad ship, built in Norway, sailed across the North Sea and now kept in the museum at the House of Manannan in Peel, Isle of Man
- Ratatosk - Built in Norway now in the United Kingdom (20 ft, 6 persons, 1/4 Scale replica of the Gokstad ship)
- Skidbladner - Full-scale replica of the Gokstad ship. Built in Sweden, now located near Haroldswick, Unst, Shetland Isles.

== Americas ==
=== Canada ===
- Munin - Vancouver, British Columbia (40 ft, 7-15 persons)
- Viking Saga - Newfoundland

=== United States ===
- Skelmir - San Antonio, Texas (22 ft, 8 persons)
- Viking - Built in the Rødsverven shipyard in Sandefjord, Norway. Currently located and undergoing conservation in Geneva, Illinois.
- Leif Erikson (42 ft, 4 persons) - sailed across the Atlantic from Bergen, Norway in 1926. Currently located at the Knife River Heritage & Cultural Center, Knife River, Minnesota.
- Redwolf - San Antonio (40 ft, 17 persons - under construction)
- Fyrdraca - Missouri (32 ft, 18 persons - retired from service with the Longship Company 2003)
- Sae Hrafn - Maryland (40 ft, 18 persons)
- Gyrfalcon - Maryland (20 ft, 5 persons)
- Skogar Þrostur (formerly called the Blackbird) - Connecticut (22 ft, 3 persons). She was built in Ohio by the group 'Viking Age Vessels' and is now owned by Vinland Longships in Connecticut.
- Yrsa - Missouri (27 ft 8 persons)
- Wulfwaig - Oklahoma City (21 ft, 5 persons)
- Hjemkomst - Moorhead, Minnesota. Building began in 1974 and sailed from Duluth, MN to Bergen, Norway in 1982 with a crew of 12. Now housed at the Hjemkomst Center in Moorhead, Minnesota
- Norseman - Kalmar Nyckel Shipyard, Wilmington, DE. (LOA: 40'; LWL: 26'; Beam: 9')
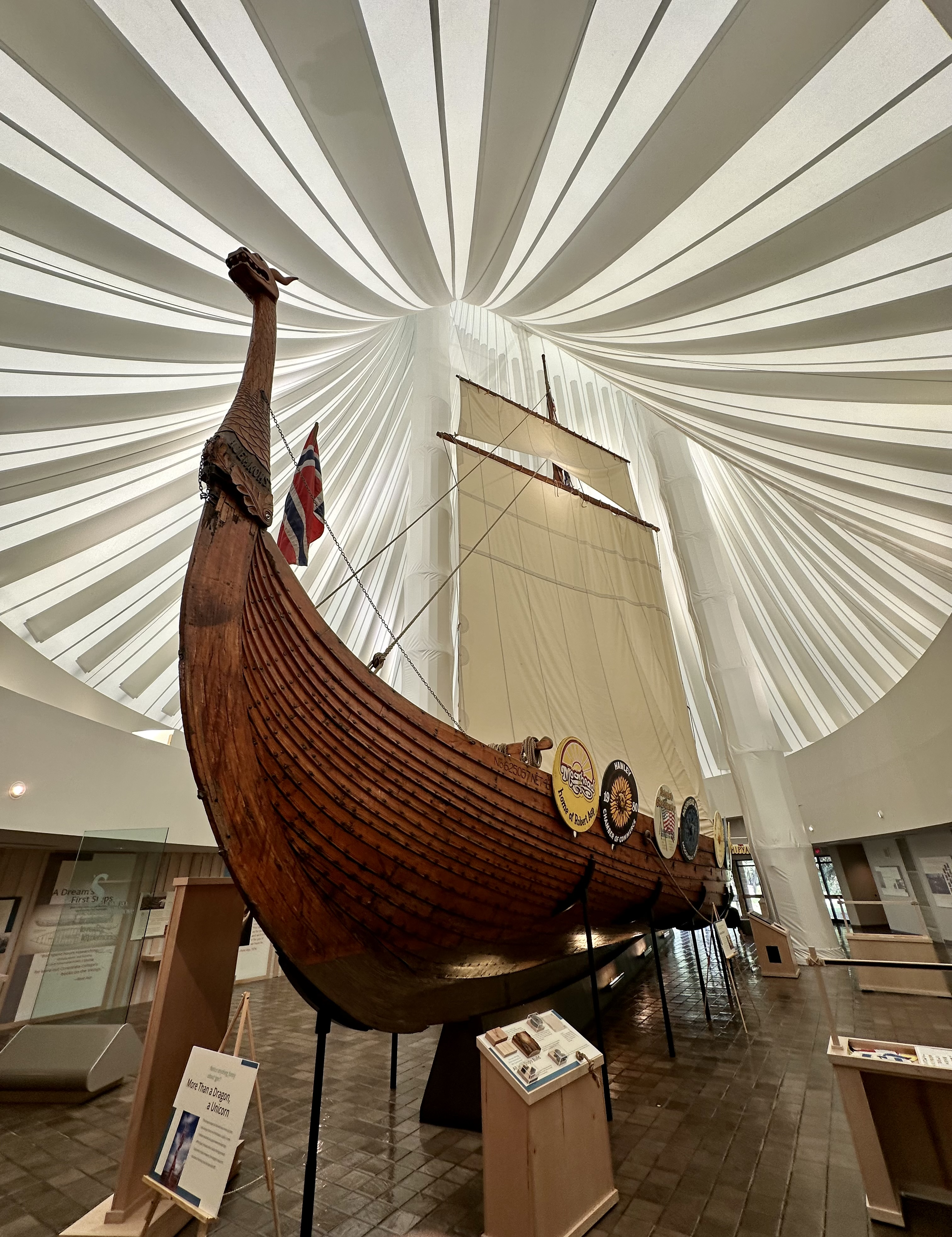
Hjemkomst sailed from Duluth, Minnesota to Bergen, Norway in 1982.

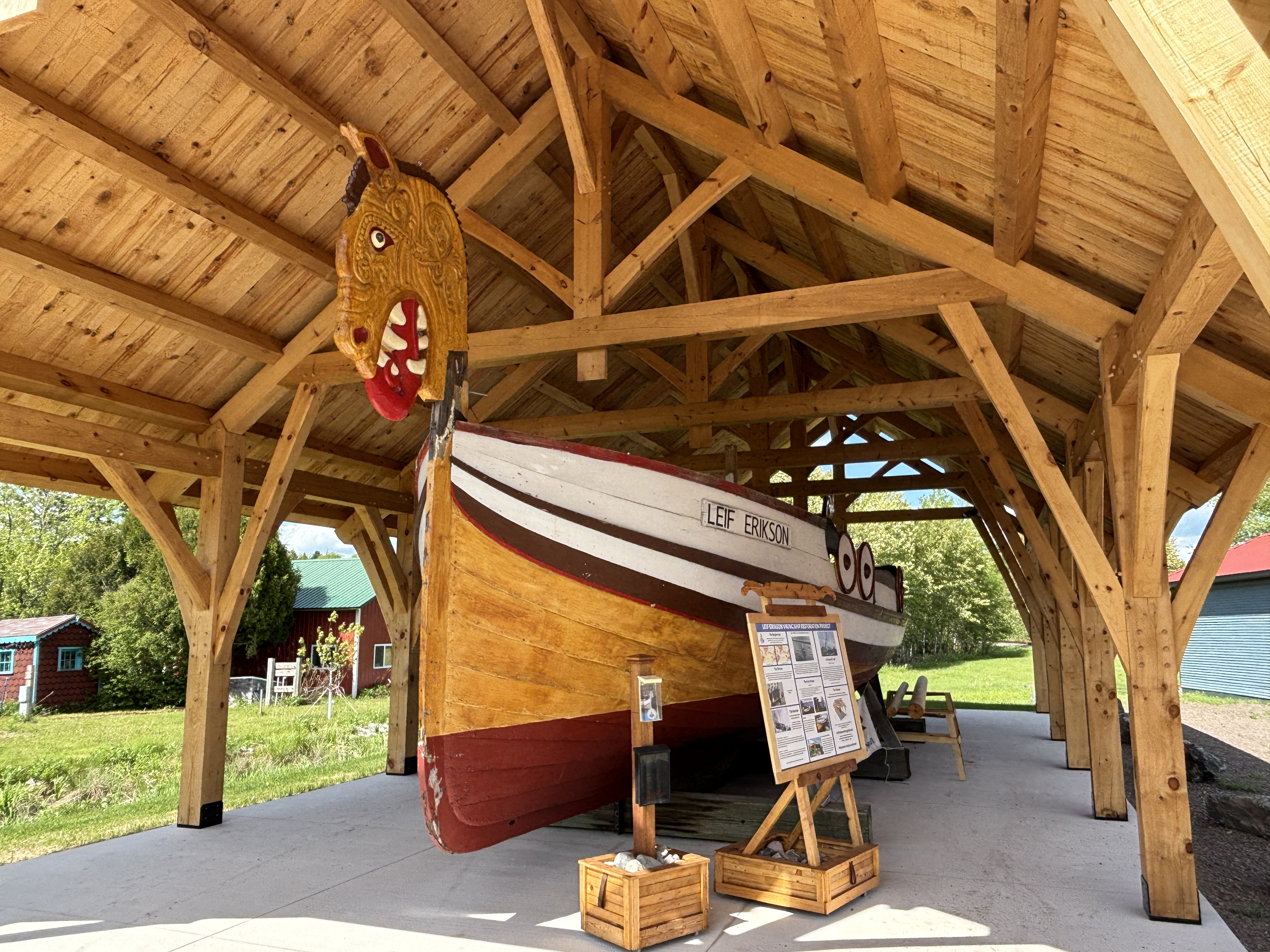
Sailed across the Atlantic from Bergen, Norway in 1926.

== See also ==
- Skuldelev ships
- Gokstad ship
- Fotevikens Museum
- Oseberg ship
