= Leif Erikson (ship) =

Replica Viking ship, built in 1926 in Norway

Coordinates: 46°47′48.2″N 92°4′55.9″W

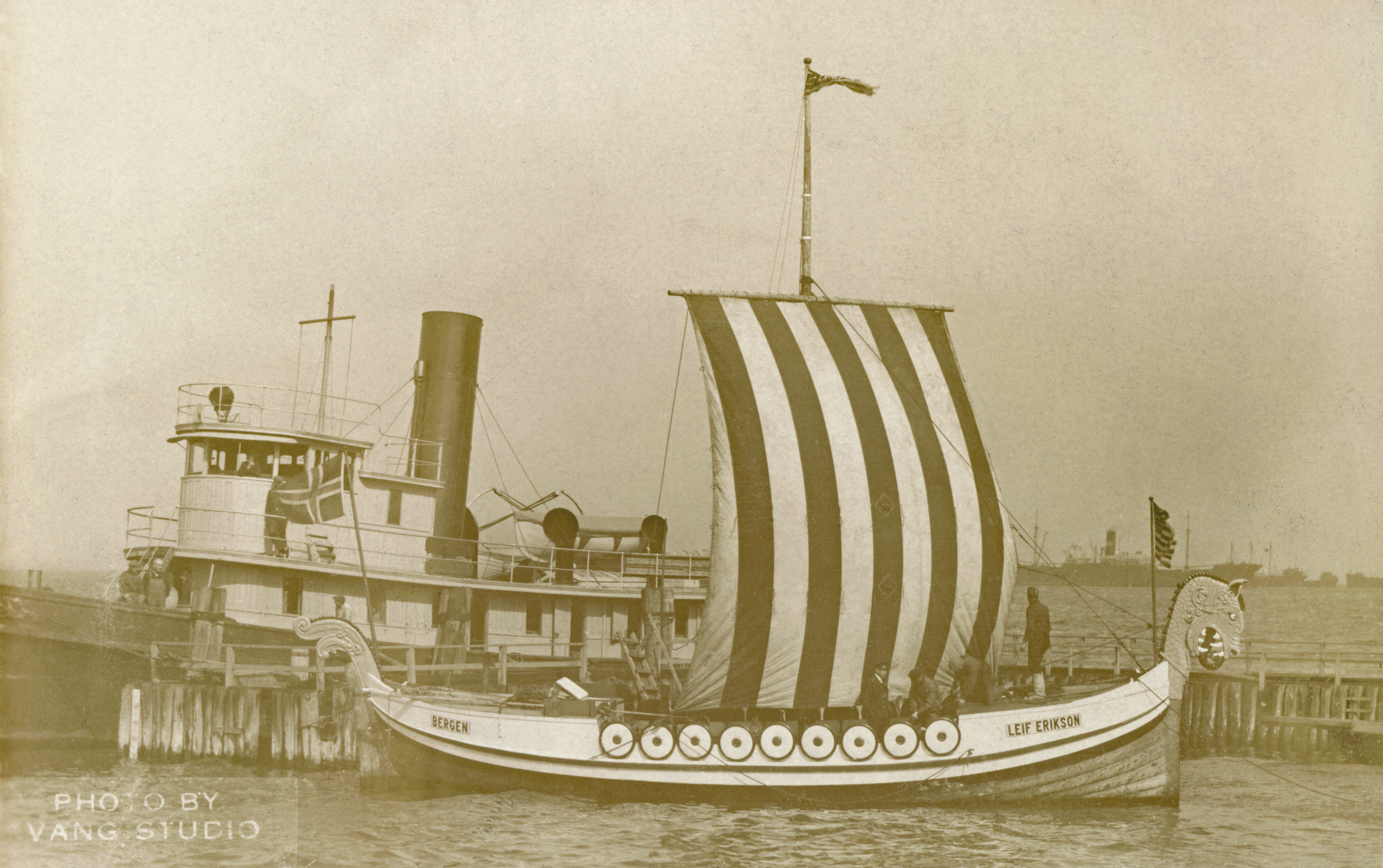
- The Leif Erikson docked at Bay Ridge, Brooklyn, New York City. Photograph taken circa December 1926.

History

Norway
- Name: Leif Erikson
- Laid down: 1925
- Launched: April 20, 1926
- Fate: Placed on display in Leif Erikson Park, Duluth, Minnesota, USA; transferred to the Knife River Heritage & Cultural Center

General characteristics
- Length: 42 ft (12.8 m)
- Beam: 12 ft 9 in (3.7 m)

Leif Erikson is a Viking ship replica built to commemorate the voyage of Leif Erikson, who is credited with reaching North America over one thousand years ago.

== History ==
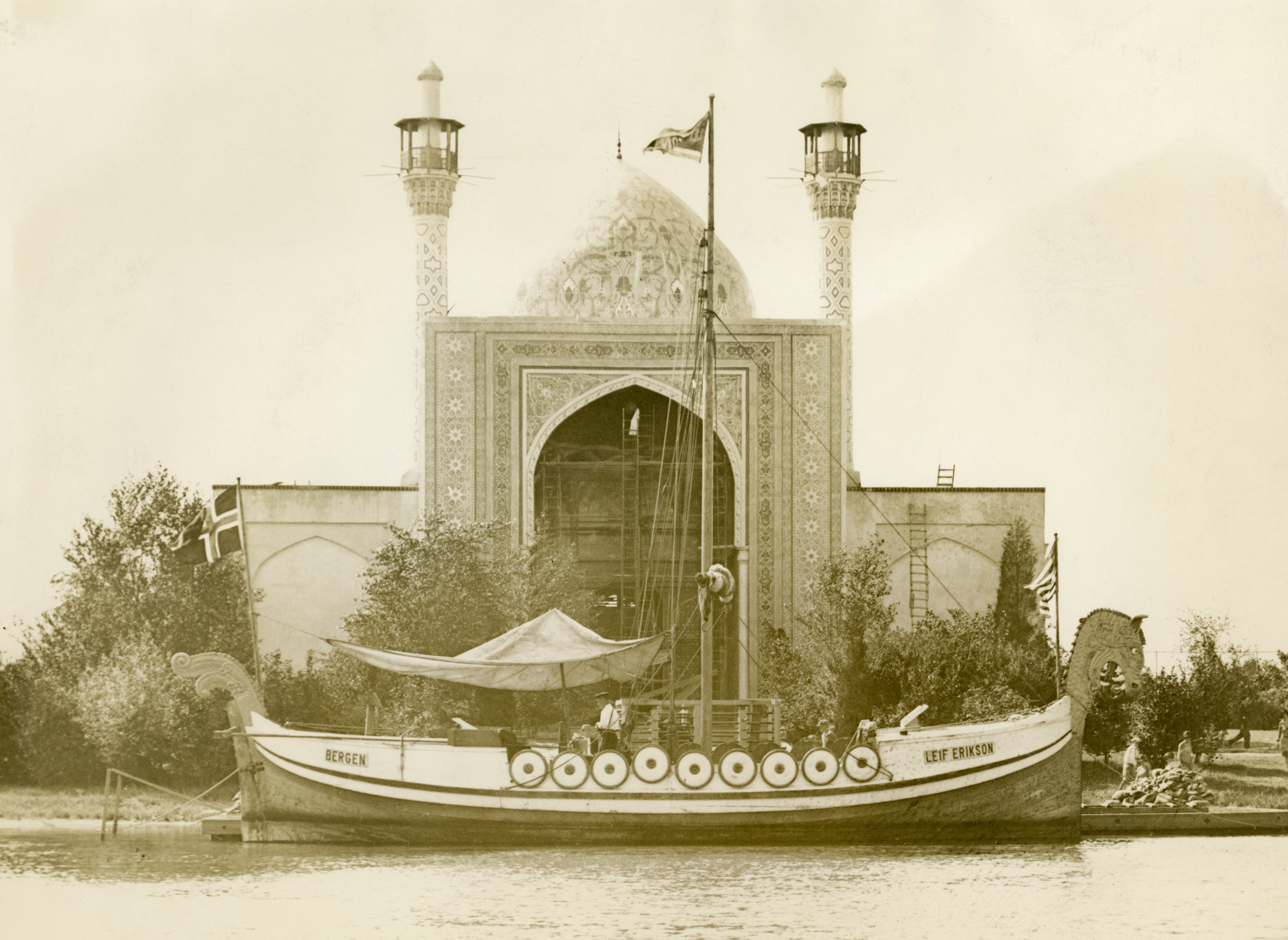
The Leif Erikson docked in front of the Persian Building during the Sesquicentennial Exposition

Leif Erikson was built at Korgen in Nordland, Norway during 1926 at the request of Gerhard Folgerø (1886–1948) for a voyage across the Atlantic Ocean. The vessel is built of Norway Pine and constructed in the form of a modified knarr. The vessel is 42 feet long, has a 12 feet 9 inches beam and draws 4 feet of water. The elaborate dragon's head and tail were designed by architect Gerhard Johan Lilletvedt of Bergen.

The ship was invited to Duluth, Minnesota by Norwegian-American immigrant H. H. Borgen. The vessel set sail in 1926 from Bergen traveling to Iceland, Greenland, Labrador (Canada), and then to Boston (United States). Afterwards, it sailed to Philadelphia, where it was on display at the Sesquicentennial Exposition. Following the exposition, the ship sailed to New York City and then on to the Great Lakes via the Erie Canal. It sailed through the Great Lakes to the western shores of Lake Superior. When Captain Folgerø and his crew landed at Duluth on June 23, 1927, they had traveled a distance of 6,700 miles, the greatest distance for a ship of its size in modern history.

Norwegian-American immigrant and Duluth businessman Bert Enger (1864–1931), along with the wife of his late business partner, Emil H. Olson (1881–1926), purchased the ship soon after the voyage and donated it to the City of Duluth. The ship was placed on display in Duluth's Lake Park, which was later named Leif Erikson Park.

== Restoration ==
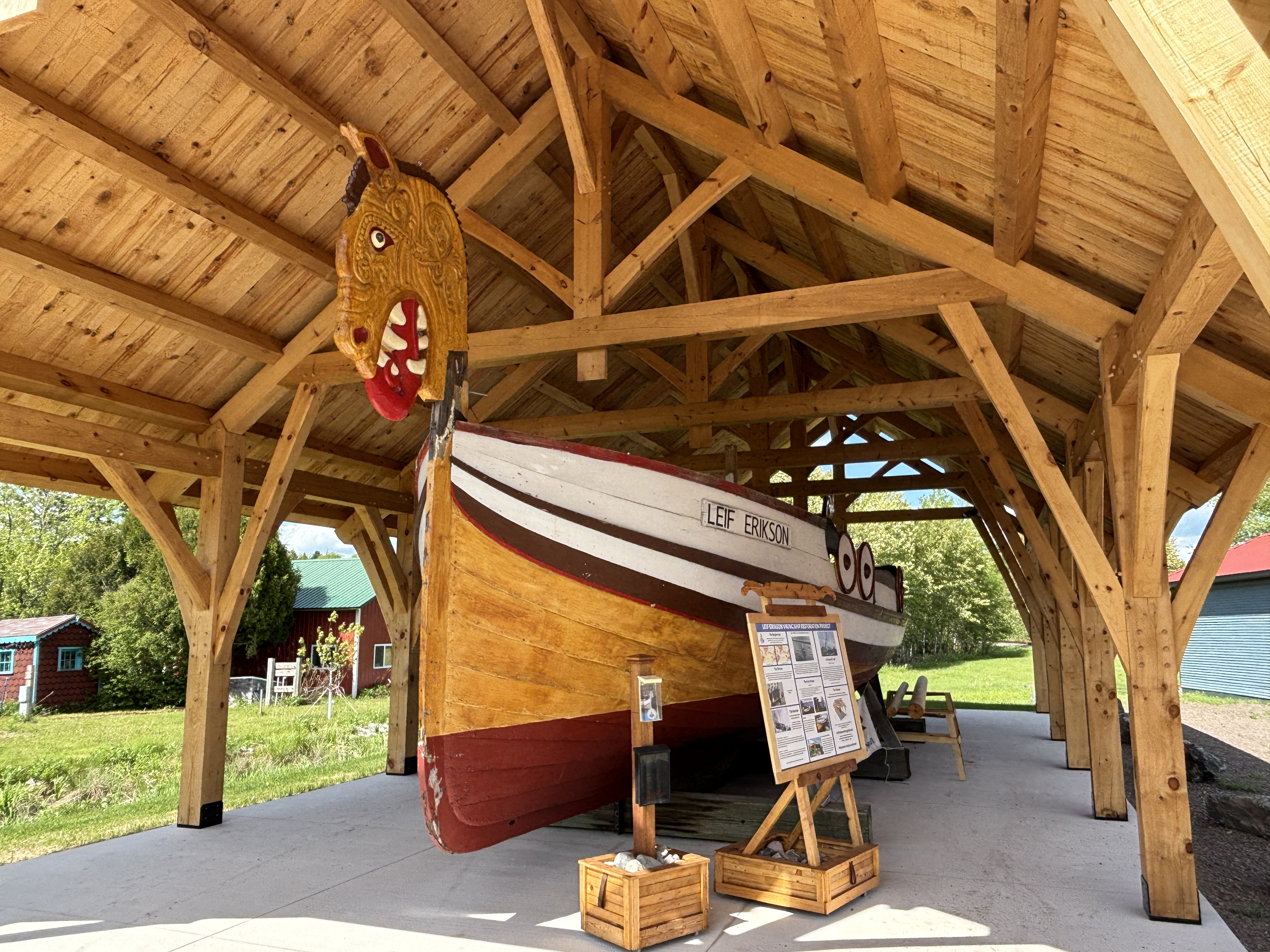
Restored ship at Knife River Heritage & Cultural Center, Knife River, Minnesota

Leif Erikson steadily deteriorated after years of neglect and vandalism, and by 1980 was in such poor condition that it was even considered that the ship be burned in the traditional Viking manner of putting a ship to rest. This suggestion inspired Emil Olson's grandson, Will Borg, to bring volunteers together and begin fundraising efforts to restore the ship. Through donations, festivals and other endeavors, the group raised $100,000. Boatbuilders began the restoration in 1991. With restoration nearly complete, the ship was reinstalled on display at the eastern end of Leif Erikson Park in Duluth, Minnesota during 2001. Due to further vandalism and degradation, the ship was again removed from the park by cranes and a flatbed trailer in 2013.

The Leif Erikson underwent further restoration under the care of Save Our Ship, Inc (“SOS”). Fundraising efforts initially aimed to return the ship to Leif Erikson Park in Duluth with a new, secure display structure. The Duluth City Council unanimously voted to officially transfer ownership of the Leif Erikson to Save Our Ship in June 2021. In November 2021, the Leif Erikson was moved from storage to be displayed in Knife River, Minnesota–20 miles Northeast of Duluth on the shore of Lake Superior. With unanimous agreement, the SOS board of directors signed a letter in June 2022 to permanently relocate the Leif Erikson to Knife River, where it will be displayed in a shelter managed by The Knife River Heritage and Cultural Center.

== See also ==
- Enger Tower
- Viking ship replica
