= Sea Stallion =

Sea Stallion may refer to:

- CH-53 Sea Stallion, a Sikorsky S-65 helicopter
- Sea Stallion from Glendalough, a replica of the Viking ship Skuldelev 2
- Sea Stallion (yacht), a superyacht; see List of motor yachts by length
