= Sebbe Als =

Viking ship replica

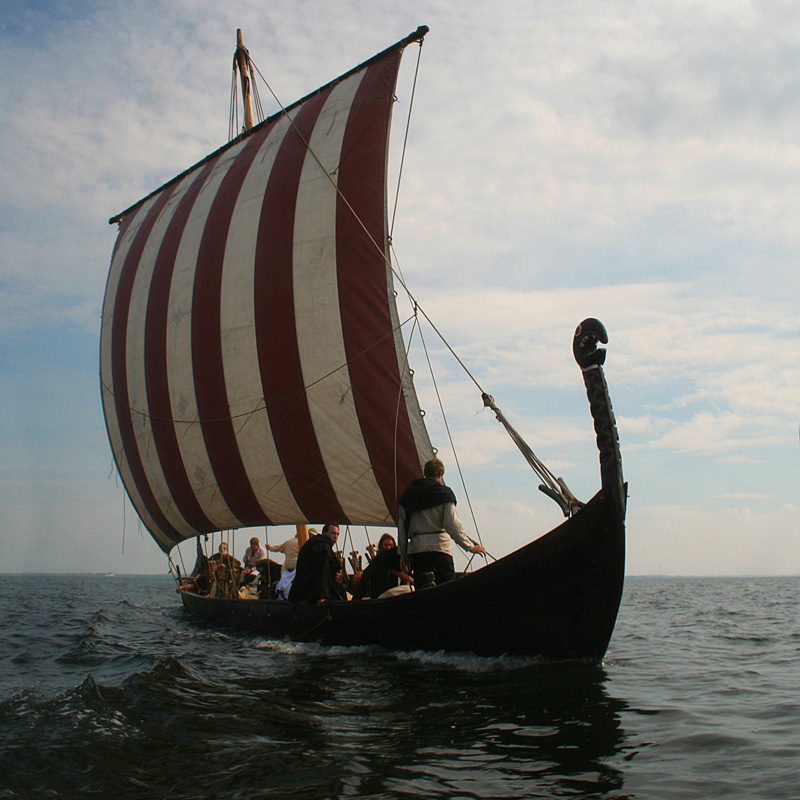
- Sebbe Als under sail, September 2006

History

(Denmark)
- Laid down: 1968
- Launched: 1969
- Homeport: Augustenborg, Denmark
- Identification: MMSI number: 912191202
- Status: In use

General characteristics
- Class & type: Viking ship, Snekke
- Displacement: 3,5 tons
- Length: LOA: 17,5 m
- Beam: 2.5 m
- Draught: 0.6 m loaded
- Propulsion: Sail & oars
- Speed: 12 kn (22 km/h)
- Complement: min. 11, max 30

Sebbe Als is a replica of a Viking ship, Skuldelev wreck no. 5. She is the oldest sailing 'fiver' in Denmark.

== Construction ==
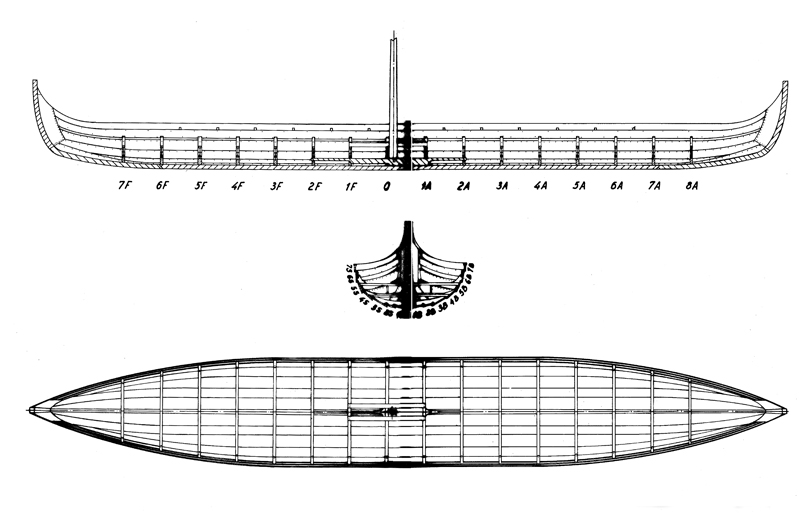
Hull drawing of Sebbe Als.

A sailing trip with the Imme Gram and the then newly found Skuldelev wrecks became the inspiration for the creation of Sebbe Als.

She was built by a group of local volunteers, a large number of whom were the local Scouts of Augustenborg, and she was launched in 1969.

The construction drawings were the first crude drawings from the Skuldelev archaeological dig. The archaeologists were keen to have an accurate replica, as the finished ship would provide invaluable information about Viking ships in general.

She was built with copies of the original tools, mainly adzes, manufactured by the local blacksmith after Viking age finds.

There was no local shipyard with sufficient room, so she was built in the-then Augustenborg Lumber Yard. When the lumber yard was closed, and a new yacht harbour built in its place, a naust (a traditional Norwegian boathouse) was built about half a nautical mile from the harbour. Each winter Sebbe Als is pulled into the naust for storage and maintenance. Most of the maintenance and repair work is done in 'work weekends' during the winter.

Sebbe is square-rigged, meaning that she has a big, roughly square sail hung under a yard. A square sail is the simplest way of creating a large sail area on a relatively low mast. During unfavourable winds, or manoeuvering in the harbour or other confined spaces, she has the propulsion in the form of oars.

== Ownership ==
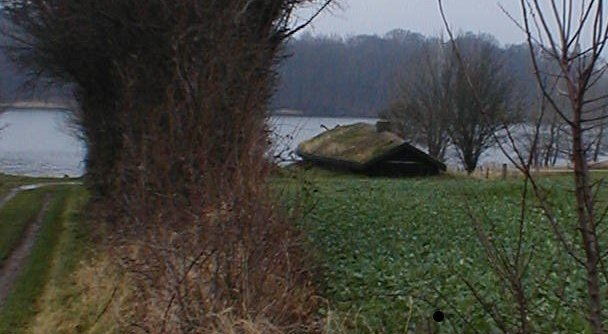
The Naust of Sebbe Als.

Sebbe Als is owned by "Vikingeskibslaget Sebbe Als" ("The Sebbe Als Viking Ship Guild"), which is a self-owned association with members all over Denmark as well as in neighbouring countries and in the United States.

The Guild also owns a smaller Viking ship - or, more correctly, a Fareoe boat - the Ottar Als, which is used for training, or simply for pleasure.

A small GRP boat with an outboard engine, Fie Als, is used as a safety- and tugboat on longer trips, or trips with an unskilled crew. Fie is generally not used as a pleasure craft.

== Experiments ==
The wreck of Skuldelev no. 5 was so well preserved, that wear marks from the original rig could be found. Sebbes mast and rig were reconstructed from these marks, but it was still necessary to experiment to clarify many of the details. As a result, Sebbe now has a 45 m^{2} square sail with only the top yard, and the steering oar has an angle of approx. 25° instead of the vertical position originally planned.

Following the experiments, the shipbuilders of the Viking age have earned much respect. Sebbe Als is not very good at tacking; at the best of times she can go only 45 degrees to the wind, but the speed is impressive, as she is approximately twice as fast as the original calculations indicated. She can easily run at 12 knots (22 km/h) on a half wind. A motivated crew can row her to about 6 knots (11 km/h), and it is faster to row her straight against the wind than tacking.

Many of the experiences gained from the use of Sebbe Als have proved useful in the construction and handling of other replicas, including Havhingsten fra Glendalough ("Sea Stallion from Glendalough").

The type of ship is so unusual nowadays that the Danish Maritime Authority has set special rules for crew and equipment. As an example, despite the low tonnage of the ship, the ship's master must at least hold a licence as Yacht Master Third class, and the ship must have a crew of at least 11. The rules are revised every few years.

== Use ==
Every year Sebbe Als undertakes a summer cruise, usually of 1 – 3 weeks duration, and has travelled along most of the Danish and north German coasts. Smaller sailing trips happen in accordance with the choice of the Guild's members, whenever a crew can be assembled.

The longest sailing trip voyage of Sebbe Als went from Hedeby (Haithabu - a trading city from the Viking age) in Schleswig-Holstein, Germany to Kaupang (another Viking age trading city) in the Oslo Firth, Norway. The trip was made in order to put an old Viking saga to the test. A Viking skipper claimed to have made the trip in just five days and five nights (120 hours). In the summer of 1972 Sebbe Als and her crew did the trip in 114 hours, and proved the possible truth of the old saga.

The longest travel voyage of Sebbe Als went to the United States - she participated in the bicentennial celebrations in 1976, mainly sailing on the Hudson River at New York City as a guest of the Hudson River Sloop Clearwater, the folk singer Pete Seeger and the Clearwater Organization. Sebbe did not cross the Atlantic under sail, but as deck cargo on a modern ship. The crew travelled by air.

She is often used in film or TV productions about the Viking age.
