= Enger Tower =

Coordinates: 46°46′34″N 92°07′30″W

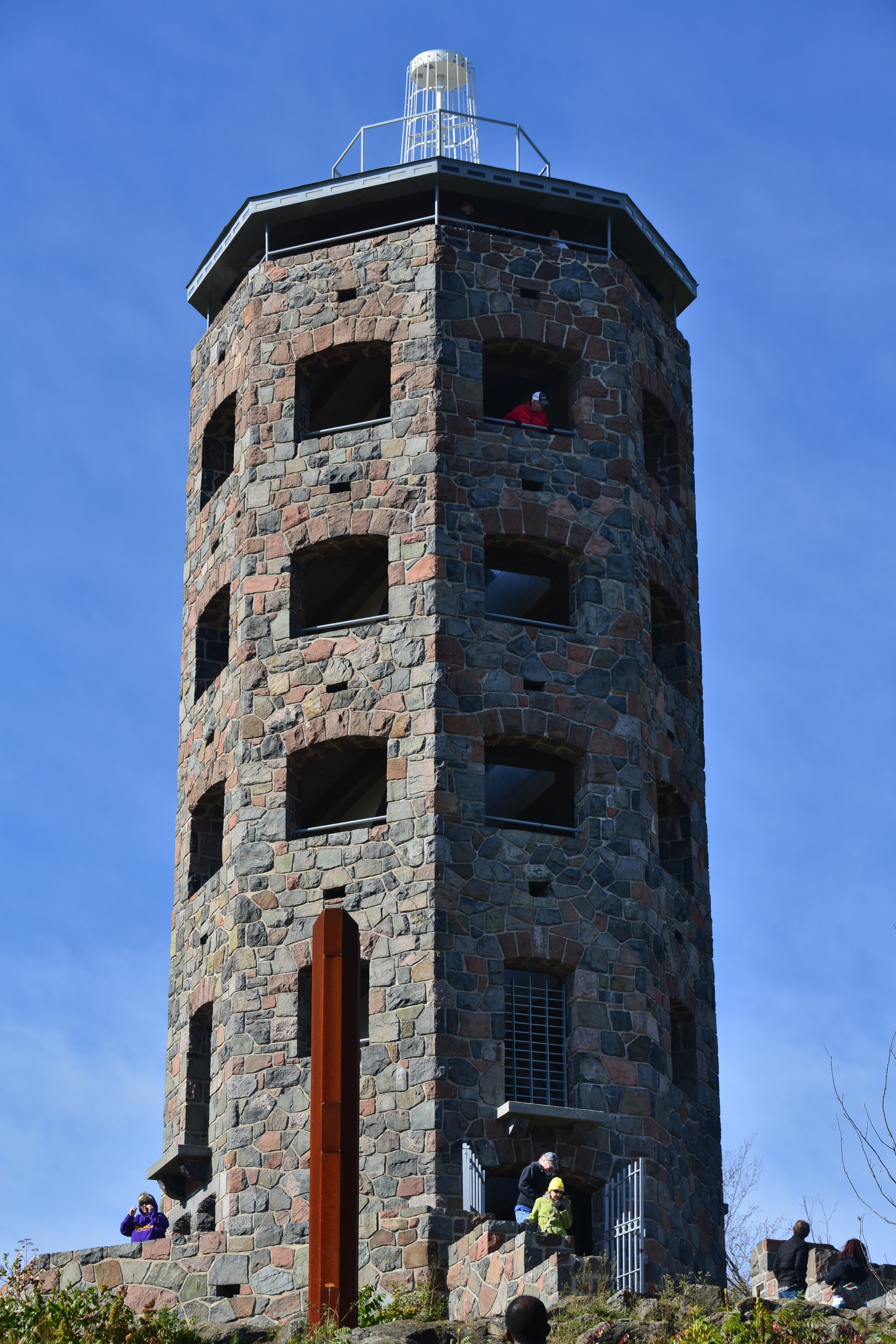
- Interactive map of the Enger Tower area

General information
- Location: Enger Park, Duluth, Minnesota
- Named for: Bert Enger
- Inaugurated: June 15, 1939

Height
- Height: 80 feet (24 m)

Website
- Enger Tower Duluth

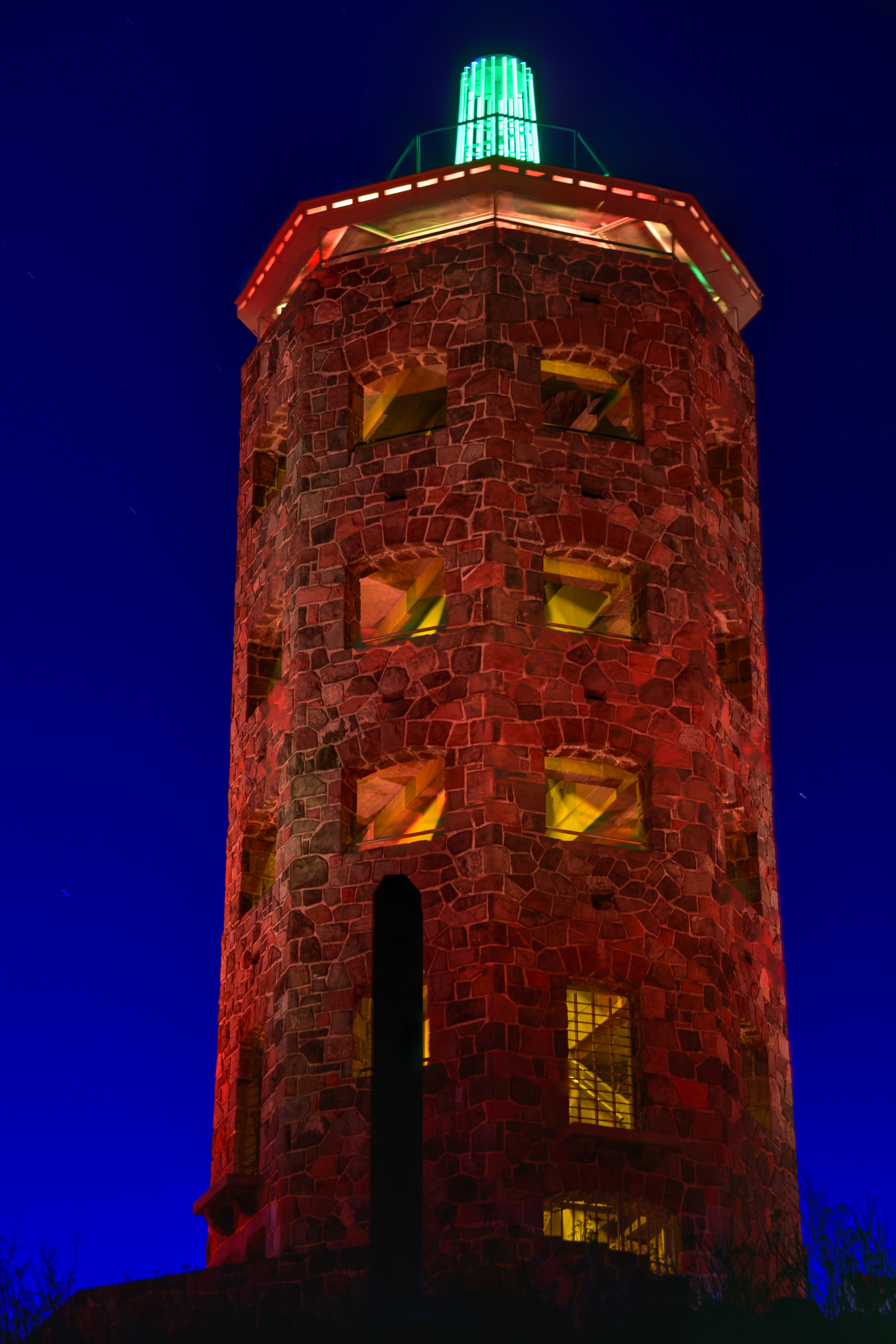
Enger Tower at night

Enger Tower is an 80-foot (24 m), five-story stone observation tower atop Enger Hill in Duluth, Minnesota.

== Description ==
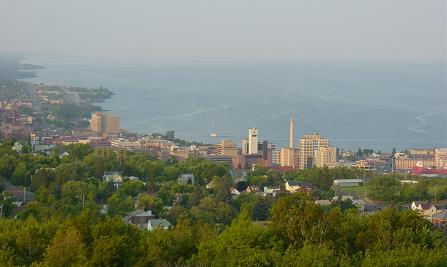
Duluth and the surrounding area from Enger Tower

Enger Tower stands above Lake Superior, providing panoramic views of the Twin Ports. The landmark is near Skyline Parkway Scenic Byway, a 28-mile byway route with scenic views of Lake Superior. Each of the tower's levels has windows that are accessible by stairs. A green beacon mounted on top of the tower can be seen for many miles. Originally the second floor contained several balcony sections. The balconies eventually fell into disrepair and were removed. Their former entrances were blocked with metal bars. Enger Tower is often lit up in honor of major events.

== History ==
Enger Tower was built as a tribute to businessman and philanthropist, Bert Enger (1864-1931). Enger was a Norwegian immigrant who first ran an unsuccessful business in Pine City, but later found success in Duluth as a furniture seller. Enger bequeathed a sizable portion of his estate to the city of Duluth. This included the land known as Enger Hill which includes Enger Park and Enger Golf Course.

The tower was first dedicated by Crown Prince Olav and Crown Princess Märtha of Norway on June 15, 1939. Enger Tower and Park were renovated during 2011. The royal couple of Norway, King Harald V, and his wife Queen Sonja, came to re-dedicate the newly renovated tower on October 17, 2011, which his parents had dedicated 72 years before.

== Gallery ==
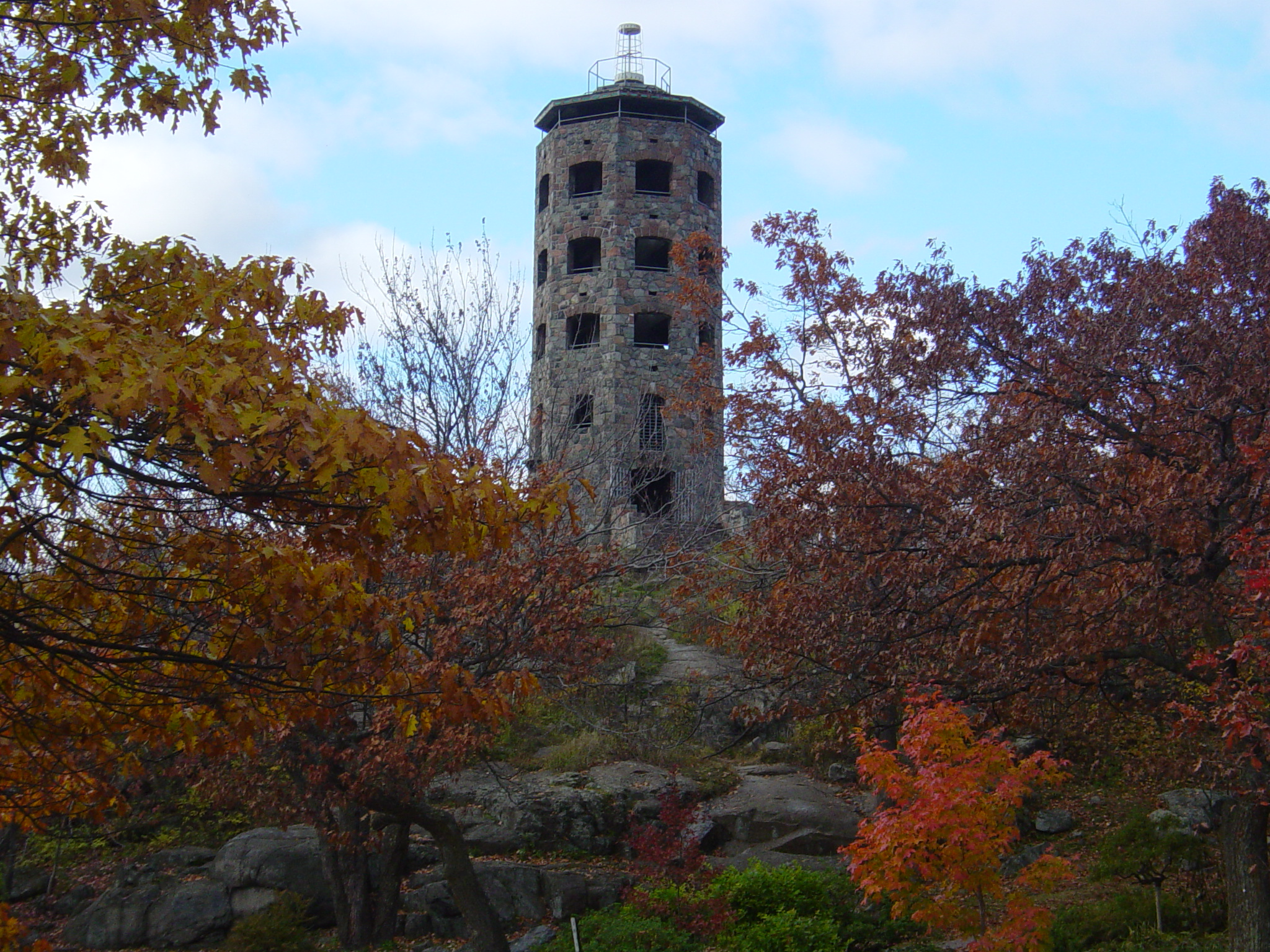
2005

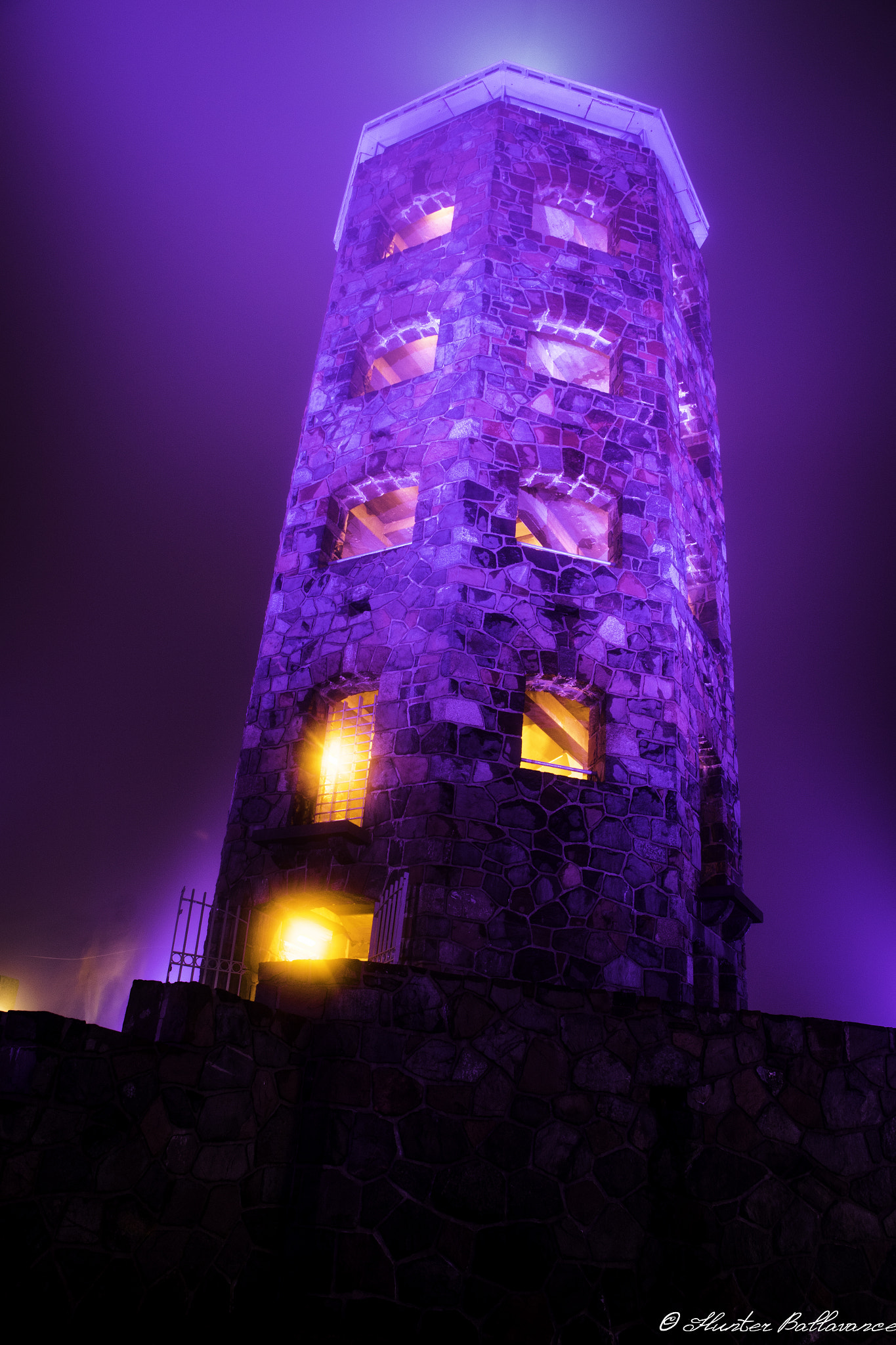
2016

== See also ==
- Leif Erikson (ship)

== Related reading ==
- Van Brunt, Walter (1921) Duluth and St. Louis County, Minnesota; Their Story and People (American historical society)
- Johnson, Nathan (2014) Legendary Locals of Pine City (Arcadia Publishing) ISBN 9781467101196
