= Euro gold and silver commemorative coins (Estonia) =

Gold and silver issues of the euro commemorative coins in Estonia

Republic of Estonia Eesti Vabariik

Euro gold and silver commemorative coins are special euro coins minted and issued by member states of the Eurozone, mainly in gold and silver, although other precious metals are also used in rare occasions. Estonia joined the Eurozone on 1. January 2011. Since then, the Bank of Estonia has been issuing both normal issues of Estonian euro coins, which are intended for circulation, and commemorative euro coins in gold and silver.

== Summary ==
As of January 2011, there has been one commemorative coin set released.

The following table shows the number of coins minted per year. In the first section, the coins are grouped by the metal used, while in the second section they are grouped by their face value.

Year	Issues	By metal			By face value				
Year	Issues	gold	silver	Others	€100	€50	€20	€10	€5
2011	2	1	1	–	–	–	1	1	–
Total	2	1	1	0	0	0	1	1	0
Coins were minted / No coins were minted

== 2011 coinage ==
Estonia's future			
Designer: Simson von Seakyl		Mint: Mint of Finland Ltd.	
Value: €10	Alloy: Ag 999.9 (Silver)	Quantity: 30,000	Quality: Proof
Issued: 2011	Diameter: 38.61 mm (1.52 in)	Weight: 28.8 g (1.02 oz; 0.93 ozt)	Issue price: €40
The €10 silver collector coin is decorated with a diamond application and named Estonia's future. It shows Kalevipoeg, the hero of the Estonian national epic, and Vanapagan, a character from Estonian folk tales, dancing the national dance Kaerajaan under the blue sky of Estonia. The reverse of the coin displays the denomination €10. The obverse of the silver coin shows the coat of arms of the Republic of Estonia, the words EESTI VABARIIK and the year of issue 2011.
Estonia's accession			
Designer: Priit Pärn		Mint: Mint of Finland Ltd.	
Value: €20	Alloy: Disk: Au 999.9 (Gold); Ring: Ag 999.9 (Silver)	Quantity: 10,000	Quality: Proof
Issued: 2011	Diameter: 27.25 mm (1.07 in)	Weight: 14.6 g (0.51 oz; 0.47 ozt); Au 8.4 g (0.30 oz; 0.27 ozt); Ag 6.2 g (0.22 oz; 0.20 ozt)	Issue price: €350
On the coin the designer has depicted the single currency system as a mechanism of a clock's cogwheels. The reverse of the coin displays the denomination €20. The obverse displays a freely drawn coat of arms of the Republic of Estonia, which symbolises Estonia's development. The obverse also shows the words EESTI VABARIIK and the year of issue 2011. The edge lettering shows alloy symbols Ag 999.9 and Au 999.9.

Bank of Estonia issued a set of both 2011 coins with matching serial numbers in a wooden box with an issue price of €440.

== See also ==
- Commemorative coins of Estonia

== Sources ==
- "Bank of Estonia - Commemorative coins". Archived from the original on 2011-02-03.
