= Günther Reindorff =

Estonian artist and graphic designer (1889–1974)

Günther-Friedrich Reindorff (Russian: Гю́нтер-Фри́дрих Ге́рманович Рейндорф, romanized: Gyúnter-Frídrikh Gérmanovich Reyndorf; 26 January 1889 – 14 March 1974) was an Estonian graphic designer, book illustrator, and educator. He designed many postage stamps series, a large number of military insignia and bookplates, diplomas, various advertising sheets and currency in the late 1920s and early 1930s.

His artistic style evolved under the influence of Art Nouveau and Art Deco works by Sergey Chekhonin, Ivan Bilibin, and other members of the Russian group Mir iskusstva.

== Life and career ==
Reindorff was born in Saint Petersburg and moved to Tallinn with his family of German descent in 1897. In 1905, he enrolled in the von Stieglitz Art School in Saint Petersburg. He graduated from the art school in 1913. Reindorff lived in Saint Petersburg, RSFSR at the time of Lenin and worked at the National Printing Office of the Soviet rouble, but after a couple of years he moved to Moscow, because the Printing Office moved there. He returned to Estonia when the Estonian War of Independence was over.

Reindorff loved to hike and spent most of his days in the academy and later on even during the Soviet era, making graphic lithographies and sketches of landscape, designing book illustrations, Estonian banknotes and coins, including the whole kroon series used from 1928 to the end of the Republic in World War II, with the government going into exile in Sweden. He also designed some early Soviet roubles before the rise of Stalin and some postage stamps.

Soviet authorities appointed him a National Artist of the USSR (1969), and he was elected a corresponding member of the USSR Academy of Fine Arts (1958), during the period when Estonia was part of the Soviet Union. He died in Tallinn.

== Gallery ==
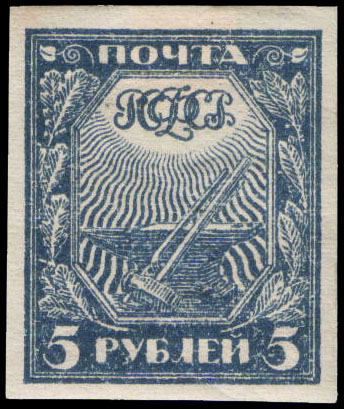
RSFSR stamp, 1921, 5 r.

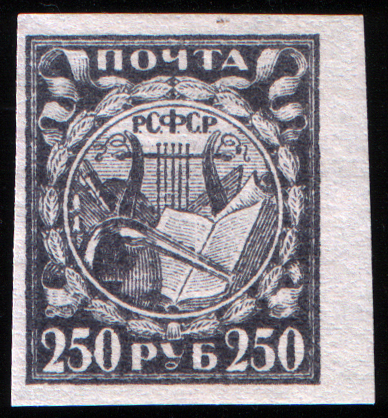
RSFSR stamp, 1921, 250 r.

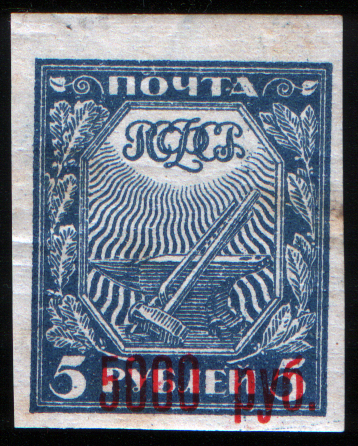
RSFSR stamp, 1922, 5000 r.

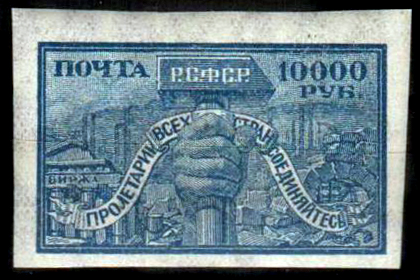
RSFSR stamp, 1922, 10000 r.

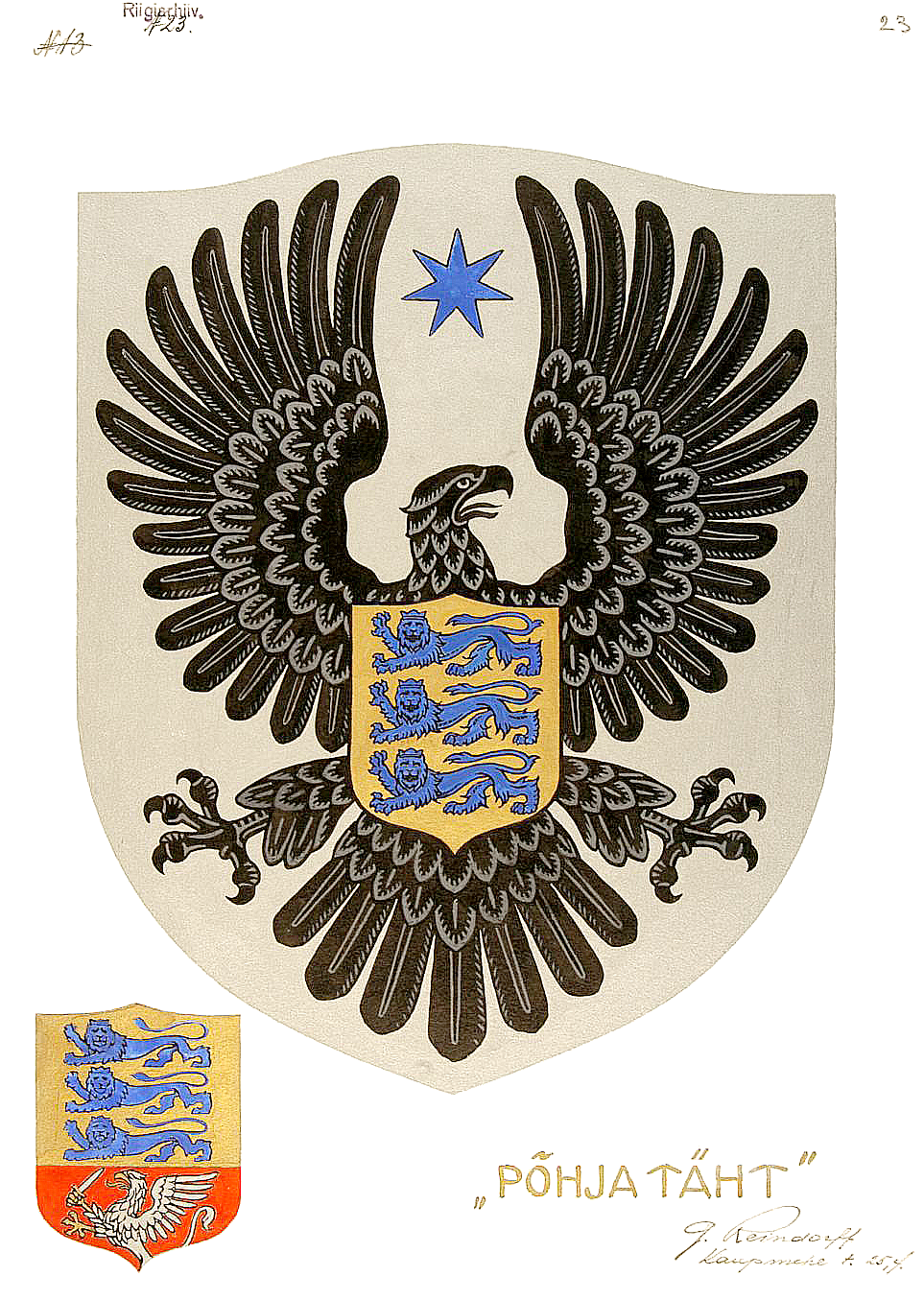
Alternative Coat of Arms of Estonia, 1922
