= Skuldelev ships =

Viking ships recovered from Peberrenden

Coordinates: 55.801°N 12.0584°E

The placement of the Skuldelev ships before excavation.

The Skuldelev ships are five original Viking ships salvaged in 1957 to 1962 by the Danish National Museum from the bottom of Roskilde Fjord, in the most important of the winding natural channels called Peberrenden near the harbor of Skuldelev, c. 20 km (12 mi) north of Roskilde in Denmark. The recovered pieces constitute five types of Viking ships and have all been dated to the 11th century. They are thought to have been an early form of blockship, i.e. ships that were scuttled to block potential invasions from the sea. The numbering of the ships is slightly confusing as when the remains were unearthed, they were thought to comprise six ships, but after "Skuldelev 2" and "Skuldelev 4" were later discovered to be parts of one ship, it was decided not to renumber the other vessels.

Together, the five Skuldelev ships provide a good source of information about the shipbuilding traditions of the late Viking Age and are now exhibited at the Viking Ship Museum in Roskilde. The museum has built accurate reconstructions of all five of the original Skuldelev ships; some of them have also been reconstructed by other groups across the world.

== Skuldelev 1 ==
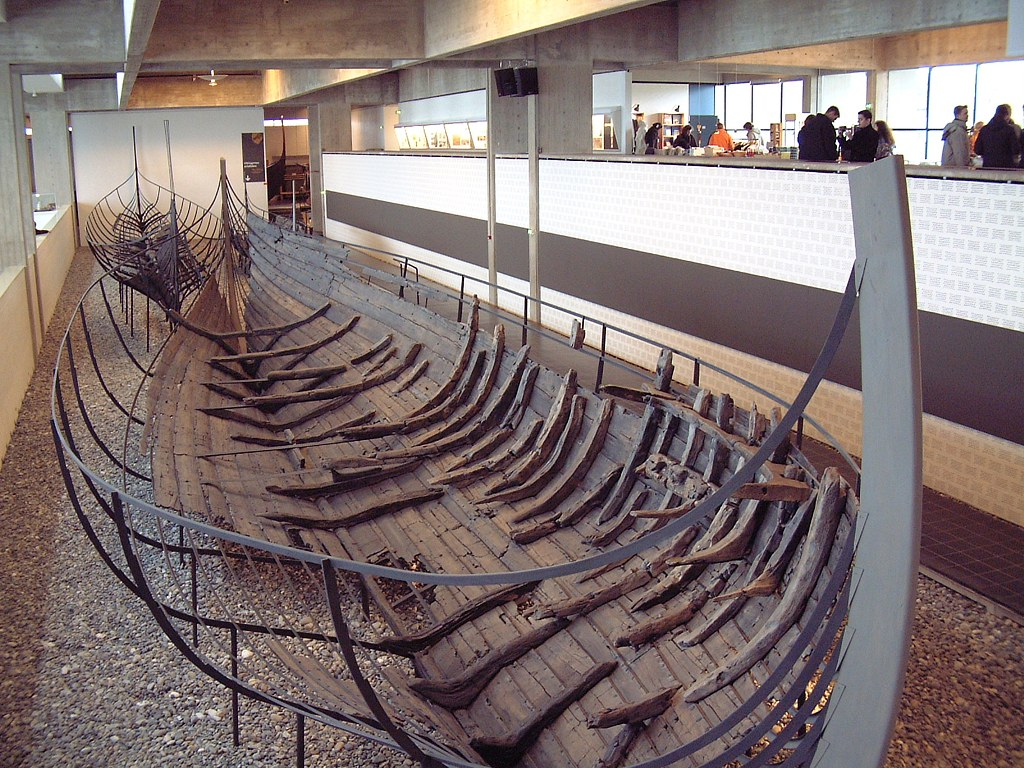
Skuldelev 1

Skuldelev 1 was a sturdy seagoing cargo-vessel, possibly of the knarr type. It is 16 m (52 ft) long and 4.8 m (16 ft) wide and would have had a draught of 1 m (3 ft 3 in) with a crew of 6 to 8. The ship was constructed in Sognefjorden in western Norway around 1030 A.D. from thick planks of pine, but has been repeatedly repaired with oak and linden wood during its lifetime, in the Oslo Fjord and in Eastern Denmark. With a sail of approximately 90 square meters and only 2-4 oars, Skuldelev 1 could have navigated the Baltic Sea, the North Sea and the North Atlantic Ocean at a top speed of 13 knots (24 km/h). Approximately 60% of the original ship has been preserved.

Skuldelev 1 has been replicated as the Viking ship Ottar by the Roskilde Viking Ship Museum and is on display in the Museum Harbour.

Dating:	Ca. 1030
Place of construction:	Western Norway
Preserved:	60%
Material:	Pine, oak and lime
Length:	15.84 meters
Breadth:	4.8 meters
Draught:	1 meter
Displacement:	20 tons
No. of oars:	2-4
Crew:	6-8 men
Sail area:	90 m2
Average speed:	5-7 knots
Top speed:	Ca 13 knots

== Skuldelev 2 ==
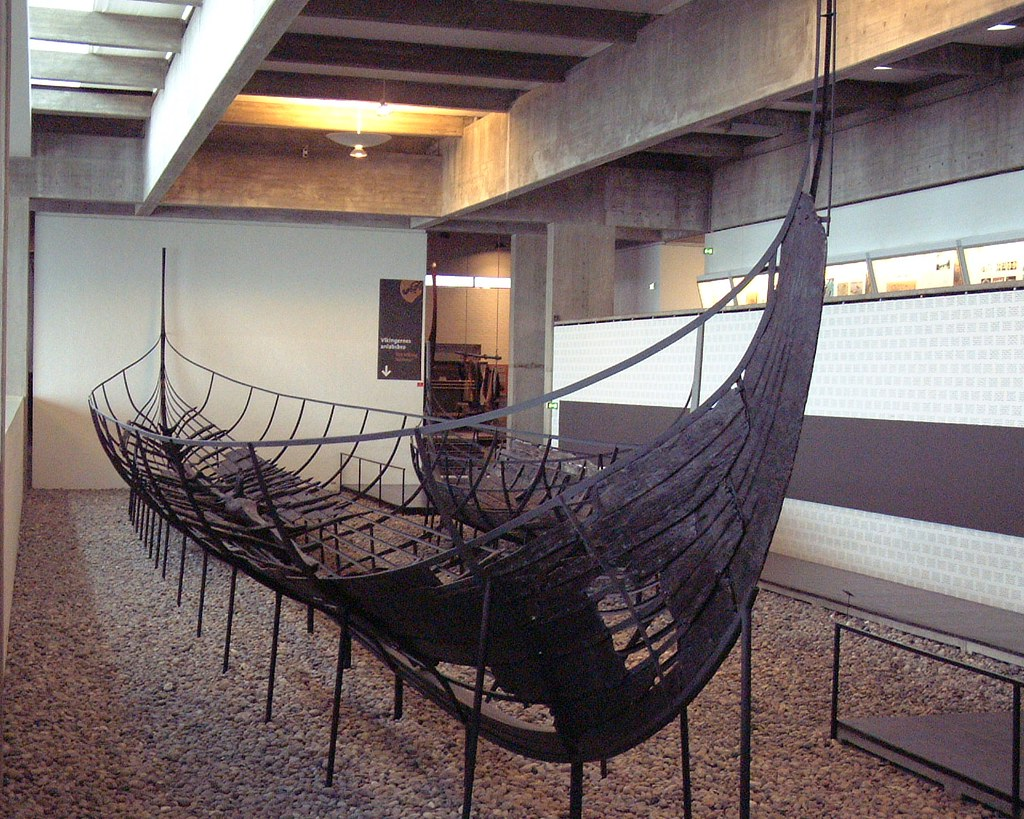
Skuldelev 2

Skuldelev 2 is an oak-built, seagoing warship. It is a longship, possibly of the skeid type.

It is approximately 30 m (98 ft) long and 3.8 m (12 ft) wide, and would have had a draught of just 1 m (3 ft 3 in) with a maximum crew of 70-80. (Note: Some sources say a maximum crew of 65-70.) Dendrochronology showed that the ship was built in the Dublin area around 1042. The shape of the ship and its large sail of an estimated 112 m^{2} (1,210 sq ft), would have allowed for great speed, up to 15 knots (28 km/h) with a rowing crew of 60 and more while under sail. It is one of the longest Viking ships ever found, but was the least preserved of the Skuldelev ships, with only 25% of the original left.

The Roskilde Viking Ship Museum administered a €1.34 million replication project of Skuldelev 2, known as Havhingsten fra Glendalough (The Sea Stallion from Glendalough). The project ran from August 2000 to September 2004 and comprised a total of almost 40,000 hours of labour. In the summer of 2007, Sea Stallion sailed from Roskilde to Dublin, arriving on 14 August. The ship was on exhibit in Dublin until the summer of 2008, at which time it sailed back to Roskilde, arriving on 9 August.

Dating:	1042
Place of construction:	Dublin, Ireland
Preserved:	Approx. 25%
Material:	Oak
Length:	Approx. 30 meters
Breadth:	3.8 meters
Draught:	1 meter
Displacement:	26 tons
No. of oars:	60
Crew:	65-70 men
Sail area:	112 m2
Average speed:	6-8 knots
Top speed:	13-17 knots

== Skuldelev 3 ==
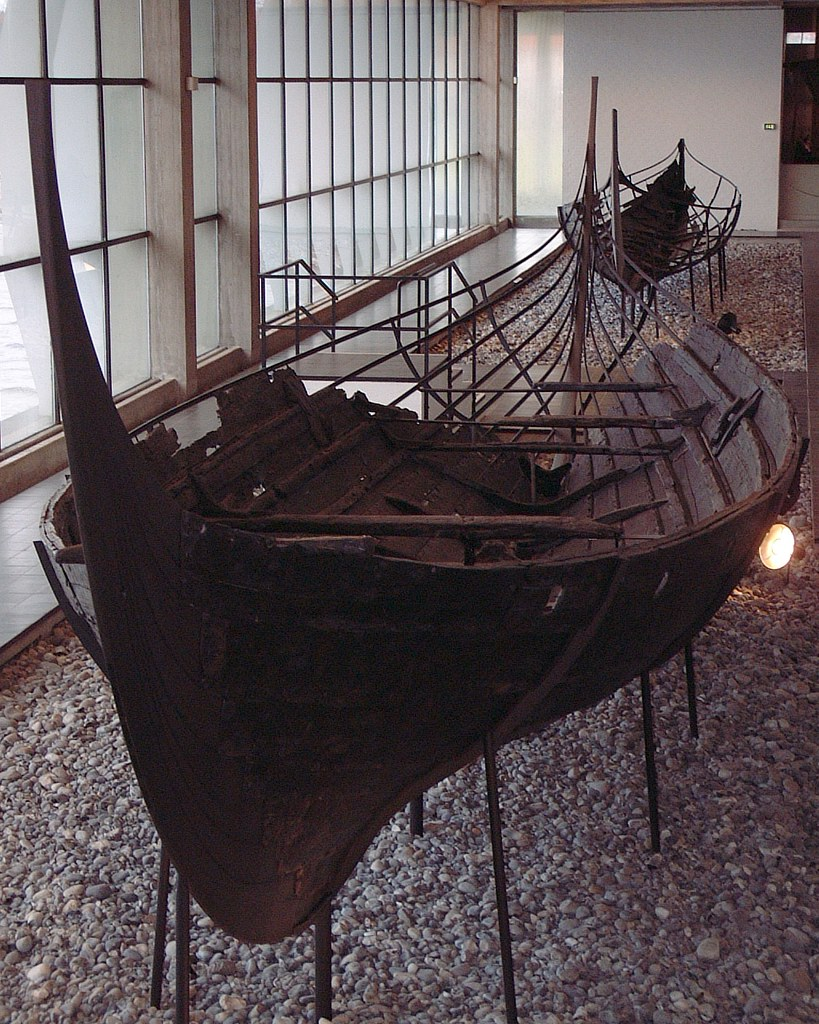
Skuldelev 3

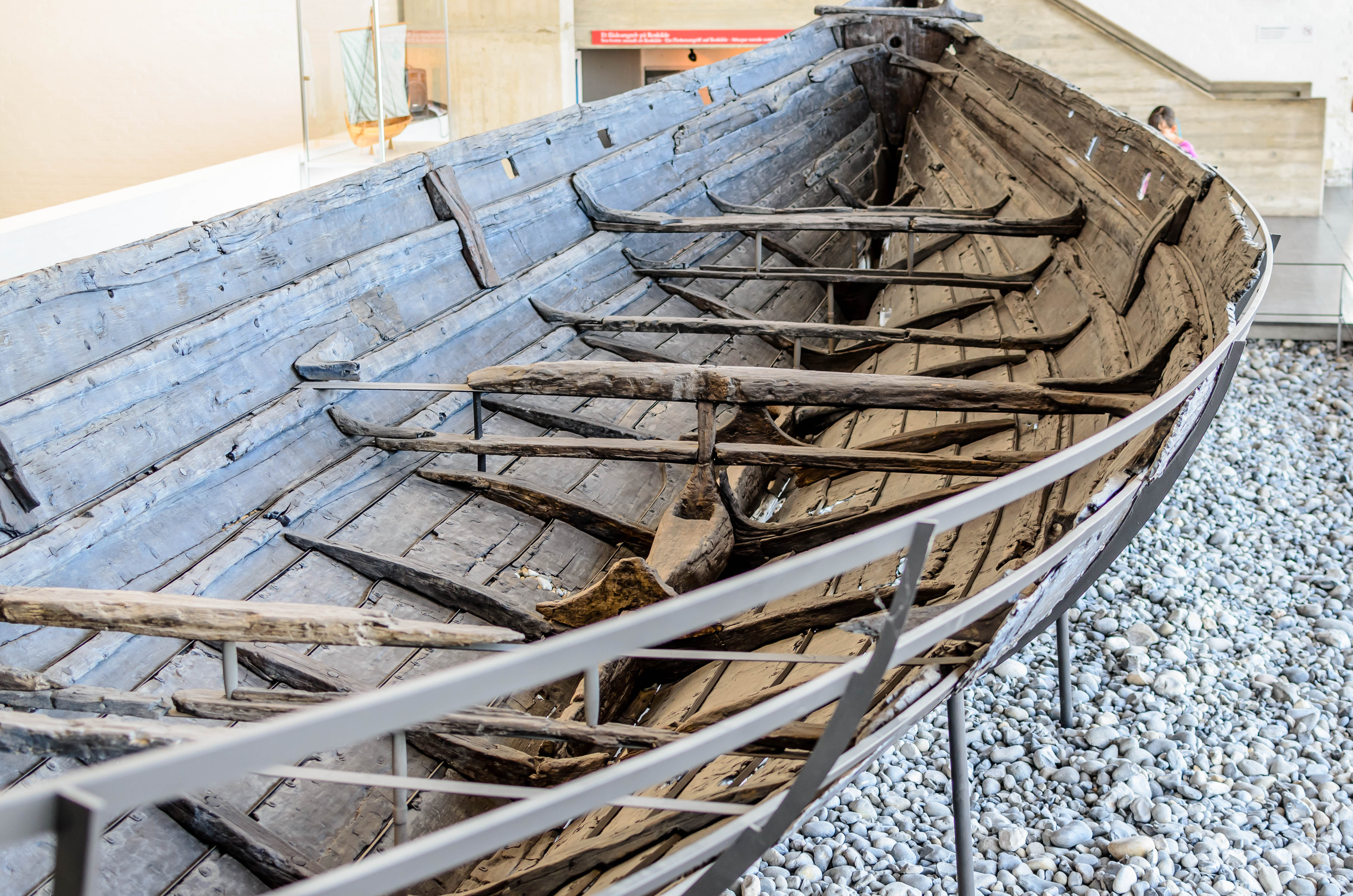
Skuldelev 3 (rear-view)

The Skuldelev 3 is a 14 m-long (46 ft) and 3.3 m-wide (11 ft) cargo ship, possibly of the byrding type. It is made from oak, with a cargo capacity of 4–5 tons and a draught of just 0.9 m (2 ft 11 in). It was constructed around 1040, somewhere in Denmark. With a crew of 5-8 and a 45 m^{2} (480 sq ft) sail as its primary power, Skuldelev 3 would have been well-suited for shorter journeys in Danish waters and the Baltic Sea.

It could reach a top speed of c. 10 knots (19 km/h). Skuldelev 3 is the best-preserved of the Skuldelev ships, with 75% of the original remaining.

Roskilde Viking Ship Museum has replicated Skuldelev 3 as the Viking ship replica Roar Ege.

Dating:	Ca. 1040
Place of construction:	Denmark
Preserved:	Ca. 75%
Material:	Oak
Length:	14 meters
Breadth:	3.3 meters
Draught:	0.9 meter
Displacement:	9.6 tons
Cargo capacity	4.6 tons
No. of oars:	5 oar ports
Crew:	5-8 men
Sail area:	45 m2
Average speed:	4-5 knots
Top speed:	8-10 knots

== Skuldelev 4 ==
During the initial dig, two parts of a ship were found. It was assumed that they were from two separate ships and were thus designated Skuldelev 2 and Skuldelev 4. Later it was discovered that both sections were from Skuldelev 2. It was decided to remove Skuldelev 4 from the catalogue with the remaining ships keeping their original designation, to avoid confusion.

== Skuldelev 5 ==
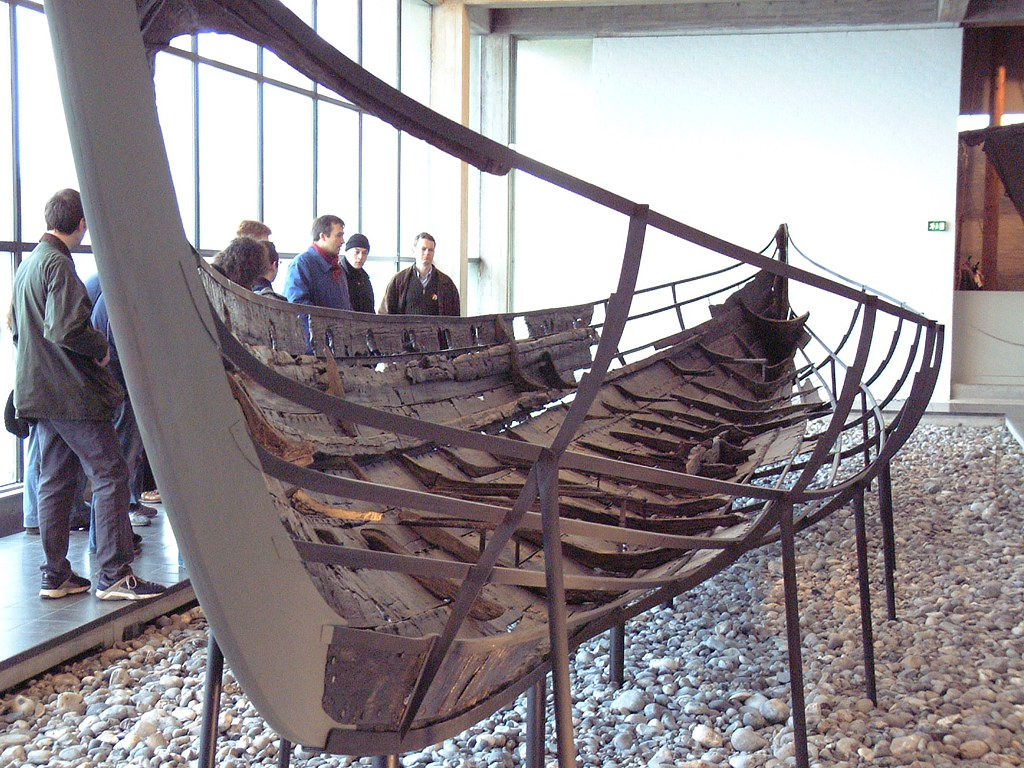
Skuldelev 5

Skuldelev 5 is a small warship of the snekkja type.

It is 17.3 m (57 ft) long and 2.5 m (8 ft 2 in) wide and would have had a draught of 0.6 m (2 ft 0 in) with a crew of about 30. It is made from a mixture of wood types with oak, pine, ash and alder, and was built around 1030 in the Roskilde area. The ship was purpose-built for sailing in the shallow Danish waters and the Baltic Sea. The top planks are equipped with holes for shield straps. With a sail of an estimated 46 m^{2} (500 sq ft), the average speed of the vessel has been calculated to have been 6 to 7 knots (11 to 13 km/h), with a maximum speed of about 15 knots (28 km/h). Approximately 50% of the original has been preserved.

Roskilde Viking Ship Museum has replicated Skuldelev 5 as the replica Helge Ask. This is not the only replica of Skuldelev 5, however, the first being Sebbe Als, built in 1969 in Augustenborg, also in Denmark. Sebbe Als is able to reach a speed of 5 knots (9 km/h) on oars alone, and under sail she does 12 knots (22 km/h).

Dating:	Ca. 1030
Place of construction:	Denmark
Preserved:	Ca. 50%
Material:	Oak, pine, ash and alder
Length:	17.3 meters
Breadth:	2.5 meters
Draught:	0.6 meter
Displacement:	7.8 tons
No. of oars:	26
Crew:	Ca. 30 men
Sail area:	46 m2
Average speed:	6-7 knots
Top speed:	Ca. 15 knots

== Skuldelev 6 ==
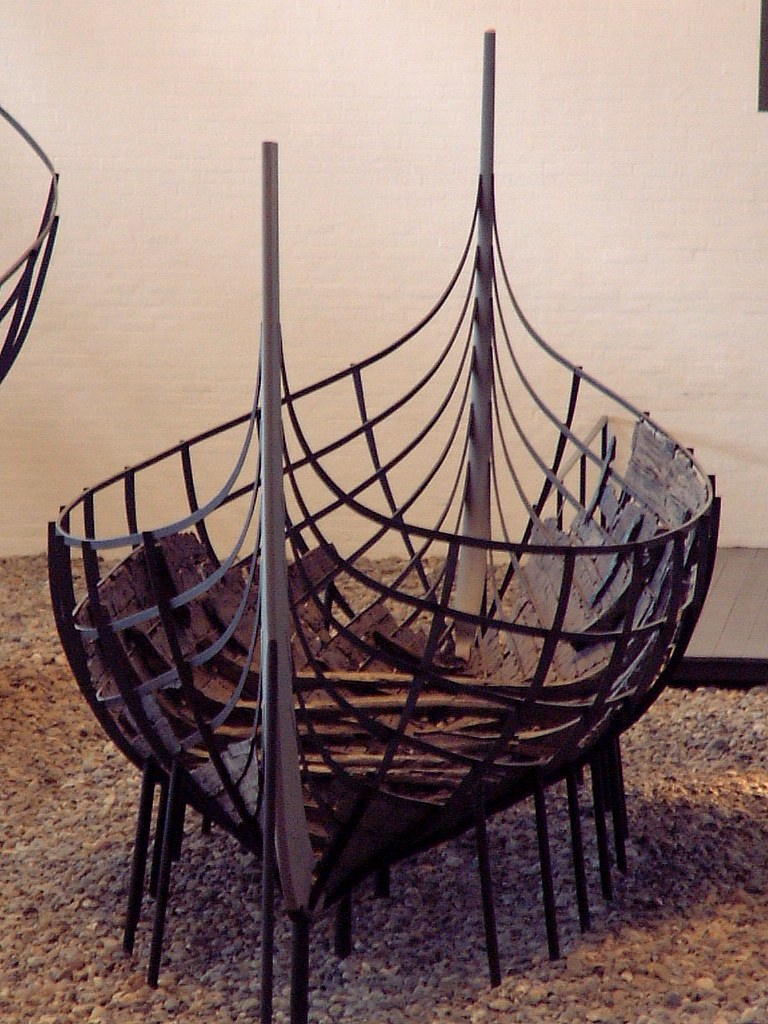
Skuldelev 6

Skuldelev 6 is an 11.2 m-long (37 ft) and 2.5 m-wide (8.2 ft) vessel of unknown purpose (probably fishing orientated), equipped with oars and a sail.

It had a good cargo capacity, with a draught of 0.5 m (1 ft 8 in) and was probably built for fishing. Like Skuldelev 1, Skuldelev 6 was built in Sognefjorden in western Norway around 1030, mainly from pine. It would have had a crew of 5-15. During its lifetime the ship was rebuilt somewhat, probably to be deployed as a coastal cargo ship. In this state it would have been known as a Ferje, a general term for smaller cargo vessels. Approximately 70% of the original ship has survived.

Skuldelev 6 has been replicated as Kraka Fyr in 1998 by the Roskilde Viking Ship Museum. In 2010, the museum replicated the original ship again as Skjoldungen. While also staying true to the original remains, Skjoldungen has a different interpretation of the bow and stern design.

Dating:	Ca. 1030
Place of construction:	Western Norway
Preserved:	Ca. 70%
Material:	Pine, birch and oak
Length:	11.2 meters
Breadth:	2.5 meters
Draught:	0.5 meter
Displacement:	3 tons
No. of oars:	14
Crew:	Ca. 5-15 men
Sail area:	26.5 m2
Average speed:	4-5 knots
Top speed:	9-12 knots
