= Commemorative coins of Estonia =

This is the list of commemorative coins of Estonia.

== Re-establishment of Independence, 1991 ==
Year	Model	Denomination	Metal composition	Dimensions	Ref
1992	Re-establishment of kroon, 28 August 1992	100 krooni	.900 silver	23 grams (0.81 oz), 36 millimetres (1.4 in)	
1996	Atlanta Olympics, 100th anniversary of Modern Olympiad	100 krooni	.925 silver	25 grams (0.88 oz), 38 millimetres (1.5 in)	
1998	80th anniversary of declaration of Independence, 1918–1998	100 krooni	.925 silver	25 grams (0.88 oz), 38 millimetres (1.5 in)	
1992	Re-establishment of Krooni currency	10 krooni	.925 silver	25 grams (0.88 oz), 38 millimetres (1.5 in)	
1992	Barcelona Olympics	10 krooni	.925 silver	25 grams (0.88 oz), 38 millimetres (1.5 in)	
1998	80th anniversary of declaration of Independence, 1918–1998	10 krooni	.925 silver	25 grams (0.88 oz), 38 millimetres (1.5 in)	
2002	370th anniversary of the founding of Tartu University	10 krooni	.925 silver	25 grams (0.88 oz), 38 millimetres (1.5 in)	
2004	The Flag of Estonia – 2004	10 krooni	.925 silver	25 grams (0.88 oz), 38 millimetres (1.5 in)	

== See also ==
- Euro gold and silver commemorative coins (Estonia)
