= Havhingsten fra Glendalough =

Full-sized reconstruction of a Viking longship

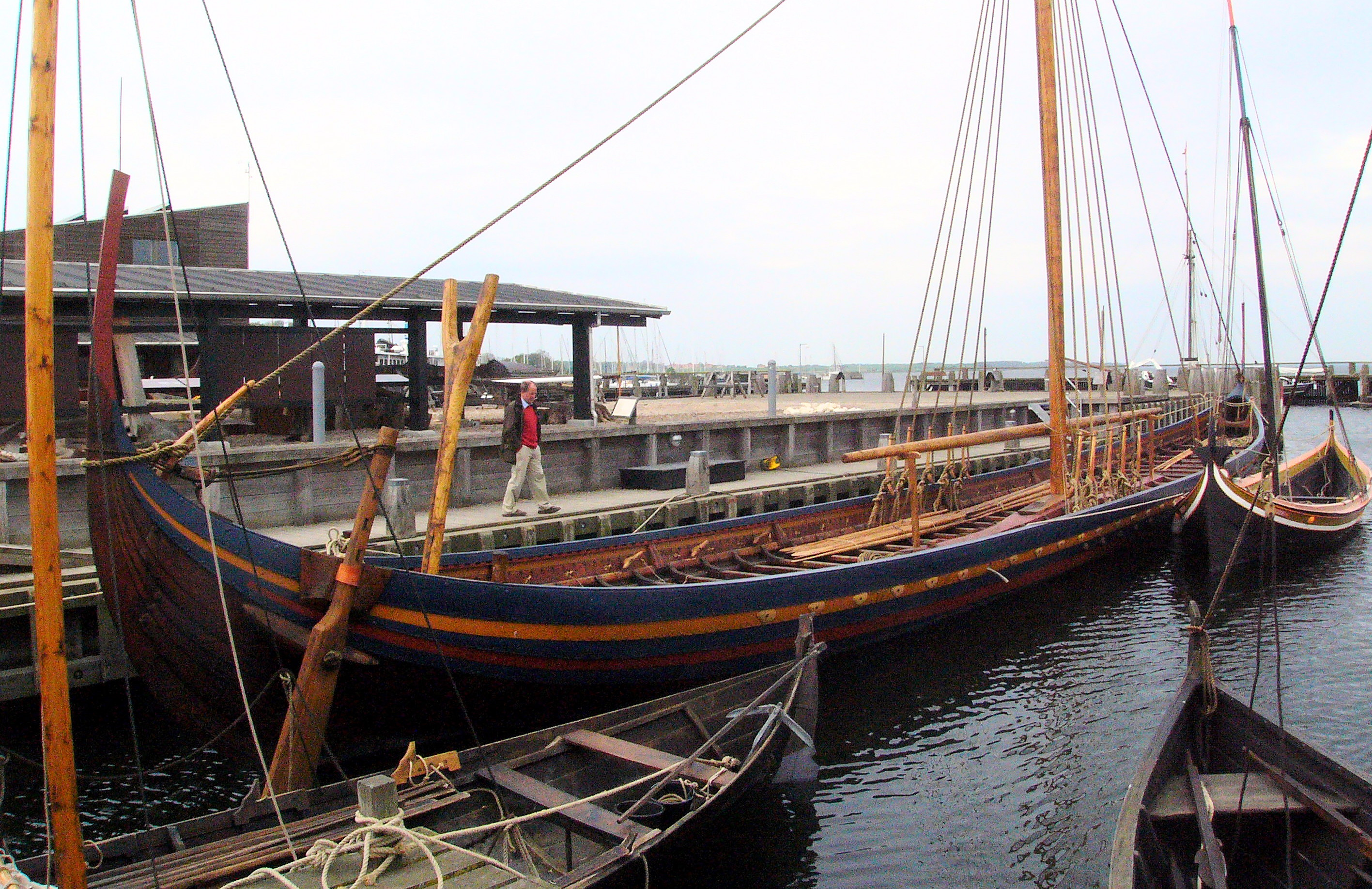
- Havhingsten fra Glendalough in Roskilde Harbour, 2005

History

Denmark
- Name: Havhingsten fra Glendalough
- Owner: Viking Ship Museum
- Launched: 2004
- Homeport: Roskilde
- Identification: MMSI number: 219007103; Callsign: XPD5887
- Status: On display

General characteristics
- Type: Longship
- Length: 100 ft (30 m)
- Propulsion: Oars & sail
- Sail plan: 144 sq yd (120 m^{2}) square sail
- Crew: 65

Havhingsten fra Glendalough ("The Sea Stallion from Glendalough" or just "Sea Stallion") is a reconstruction of Skuldelev 2, one of the Skuldelev ships and the second-largest Viking longship ever to be found. The original vessel was built in the vicinity of Dublin around 1042, using oak from Glendalough in County Wicklow, Ireland, hence the ship's name. The reconstruction was built in Denmark at the shipyard of the Viking Ship Museum in Roskilde between 2000 and 2004 and is used for historical research purposes.

The ship is a war machine, built to carry many warriors at high speed. It is a bold design, both heavy and strong enough to carry its 112 m^{2} sail, but also sufficiently light and long to be rowed by a crew of 60 — a compromise between strength and lightness.

The ship has been used during the production of historical fiction television series The Last Kingdom.

== Research trip to Dublin 2007 ==
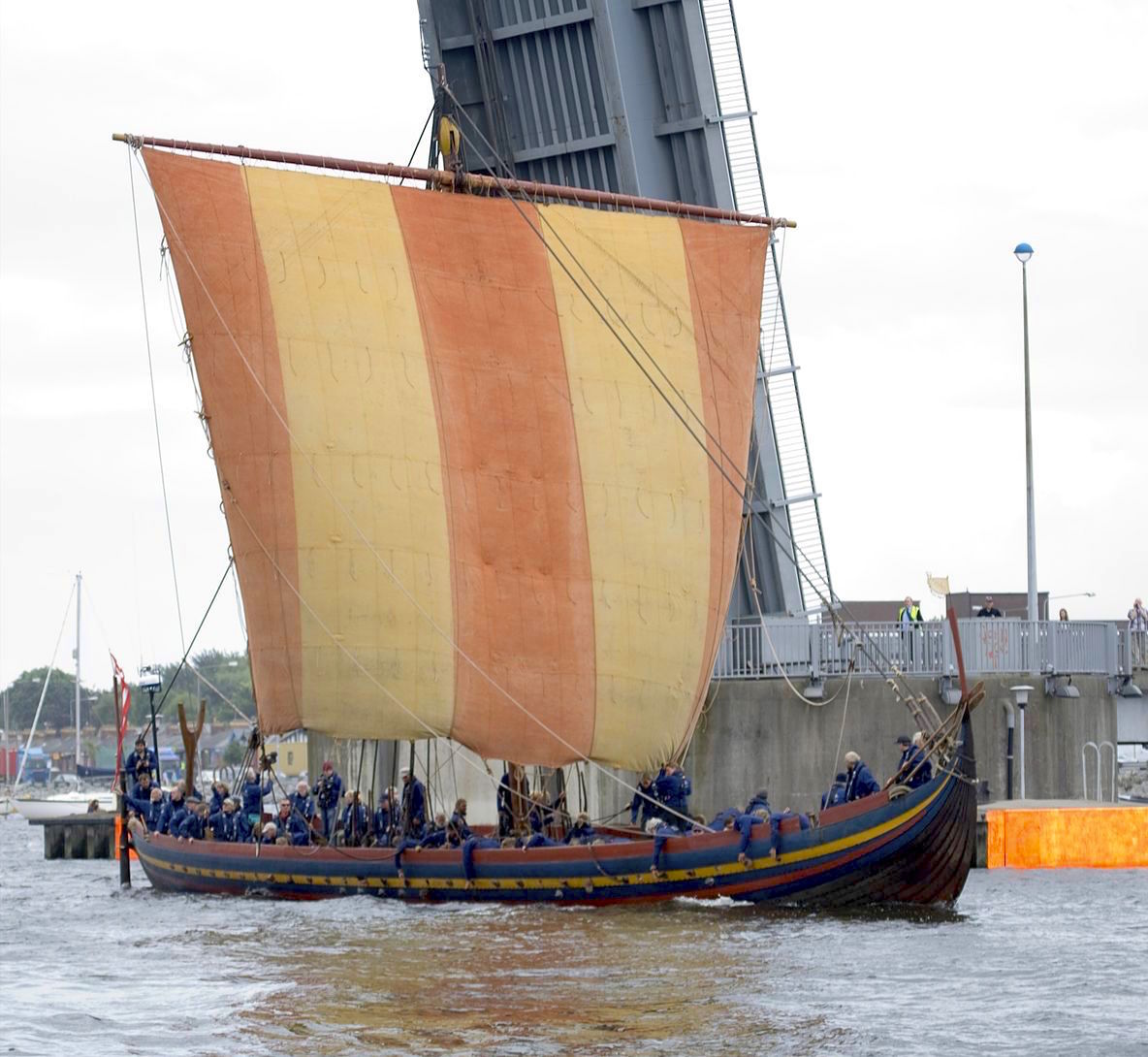
Sea Stallion in Dublin

The voyage from Roskilde to Dublin and in 2007-2008 was the culmination of many years of work, and the most ambitious archaeological experiment the museum has ever carried out.

A return voyage to Dublin took place over the summer of 2007. The ship left Roskilde Harbour on 1 July and arrived in Dublin on 14 August.

She was put on display in the Collins Barracks, the Decorative Arts and History building of the National Museum of Ireland, from 17 August 2007 until 29 May 2008. She was then moved to the Grand Canal Dock to be prepared for the journey back to Roskilde on 29 June 2008, and shortly afterwards the National Bank of Denmark issued a 20-kroner commemorative coin in celebration of the event.

The Sea Stallion is lying in the Museum Harbour. The longship is easy to recognize with its characteristic blue, red and yellow strakes.
