= Knarr =

Type of Norse merchant ship used by the Vikings

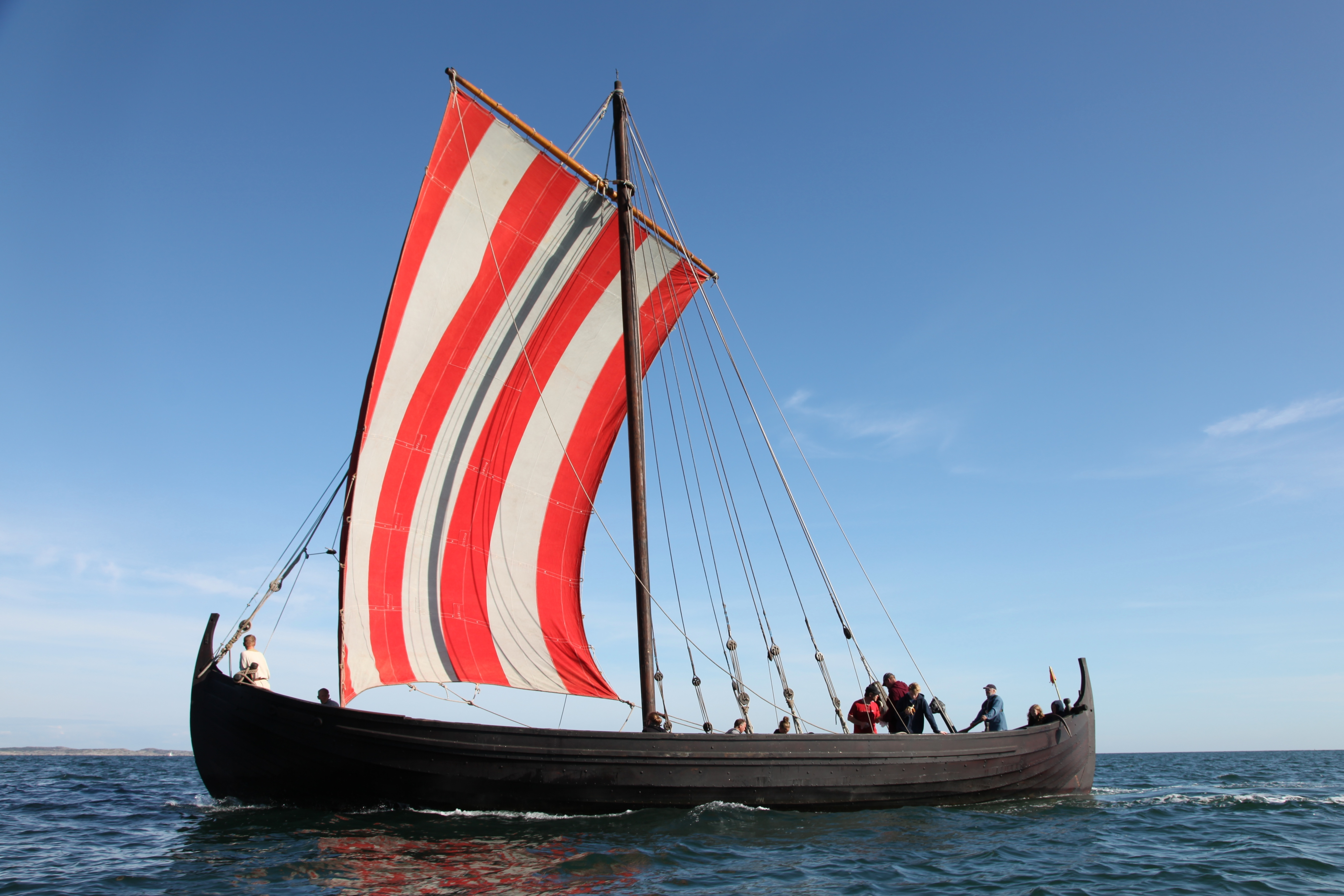
Vidfamne, a replica of the Äskekärr knarr from Sweden

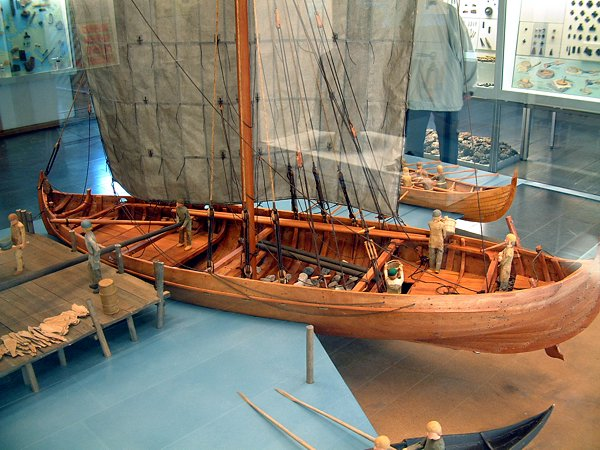
Model of a knarr in the Hedeby Viking Museum in Germany

Knarr (Old Norse: knarr; Old English: cnearr, cnear; Old High German: gnarren) were the Norse merchant and cargo ships of the Viking Age, used by Vikings for long sea voyages and during the Viking expansion. While the name etymologically suggests that it was used as a warship at times, the types from the latter half of the Viking Age were built as work boats for handling cargo; the hull of a common knarr was wider, deeper and shorter than a longship, and could take more cargo and be operated by smaller crews.

The knarr was primarily used to transport trading goods like walrus ivory, wool, timber, wheat, furs and pelts, armour, slaves, honey, and weapons. It was also used to supply food, drink, weapons and armour to warriors and traders along their journeys across the Baltic, the Mediterranean and other seas. Knarrs routinely crossed the North Atlantic carrying livestock such as sheep and horses, and stores to Norse settlements in Iceland, Greenland and Vinland as well as trading goods to trading posts in the British Isles, Continental Europe and possibly the Middle East. The knarr was constructed using the same clinker-built method as longships, karves, and faerings.

== Etymology ==
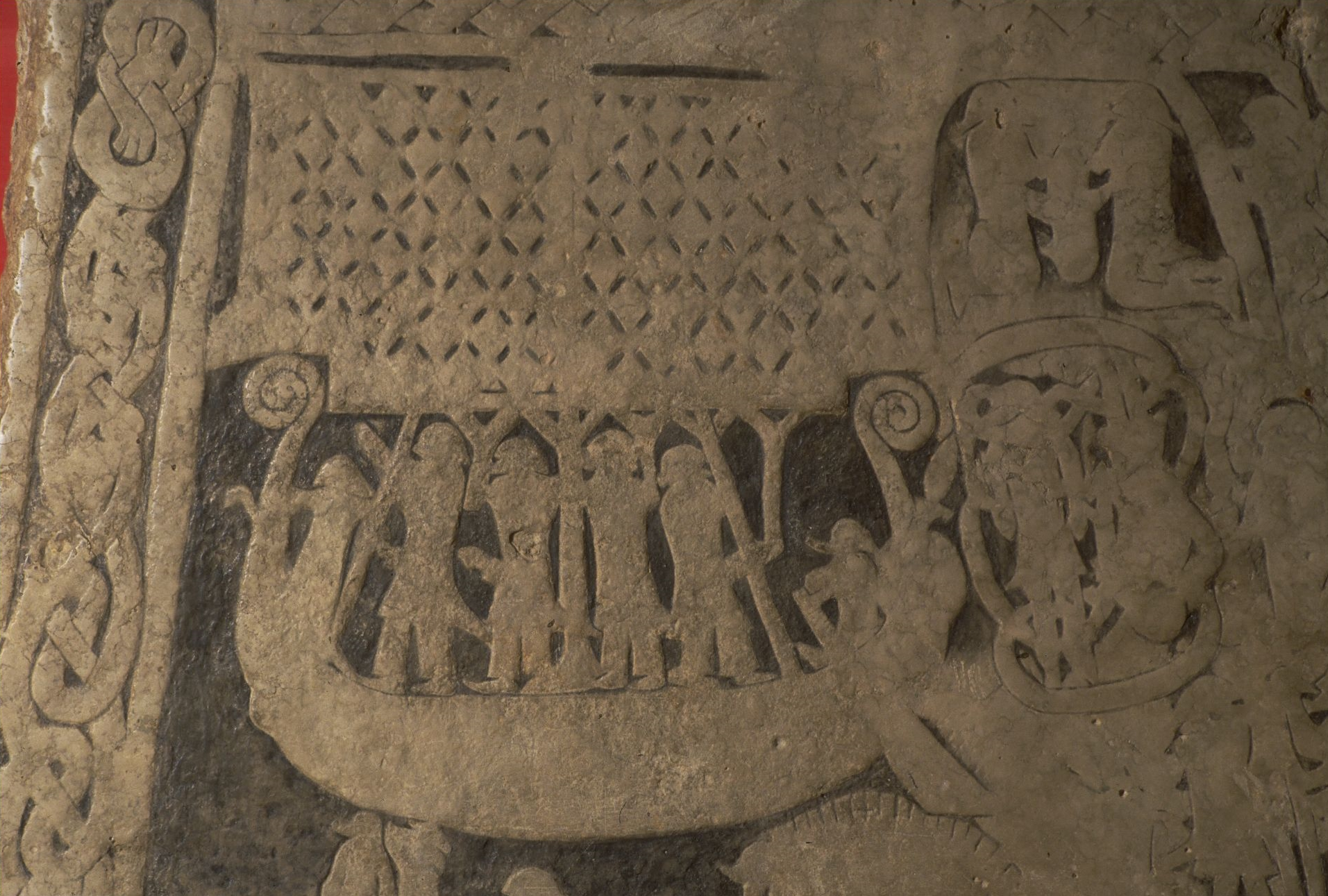
Potential early knarr with "knurls" on the stems.

The etymology of knarr is unknown, but it is speculated to stem from knǫrr ("knurl, gnarl"), referencing a ship with "swirls" on the stems, akin to the Oseberg ship and many ships on picture stones. Another theory connects it with the sound of creaking bords (Nordic languages: knarr, German: Knarr).

Descendants include: older Danish: knar, knaar, Faroese: knörrur, Icelandic: knörr, dialectal Norwegian: knurr, dialectal Swedish: knorr, knorre, knore, knor, knarr, being a word for a kind of small wooden rowing- or sailing boat, otherwise known as eka. The word also appears in Old English as cnearr or cnear, referencing the Norse ships, and in Old High German as gnarren, meaning "ship".

== Construction ==
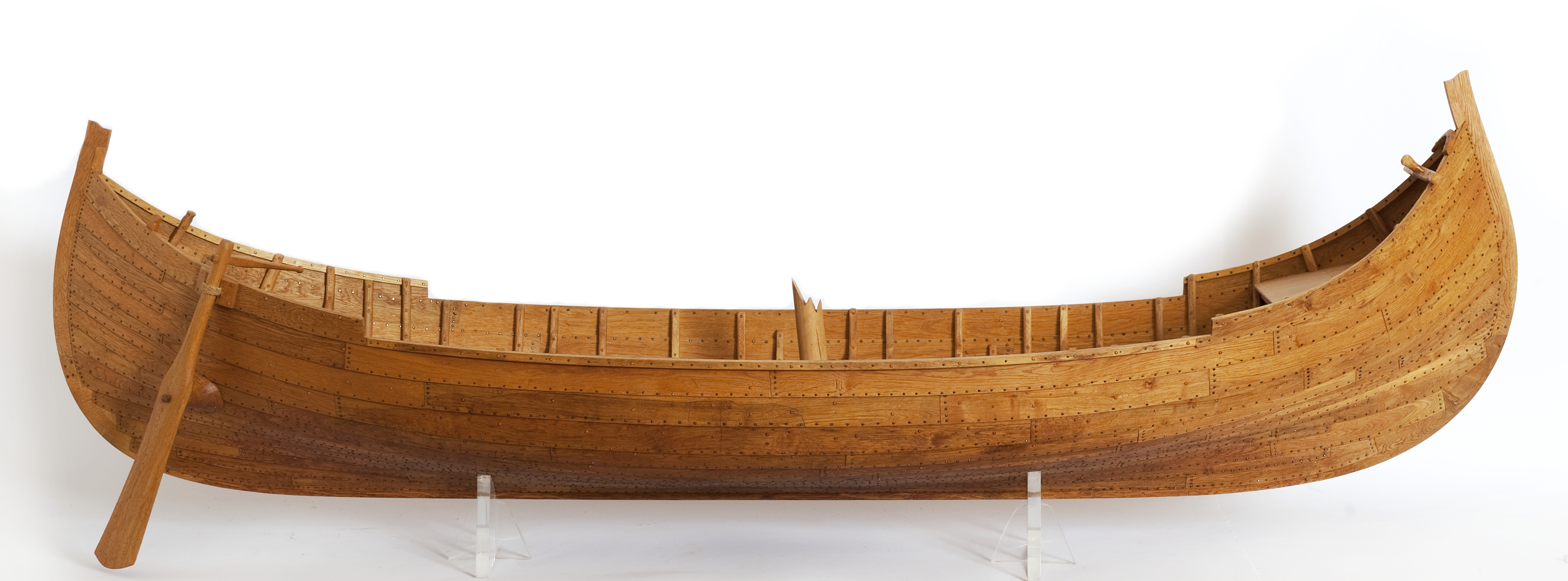
Modell of the hull of the Äskekärr knarr found in Äskekärr, Sweden

Oak, which was widely available in southern Scandinavia, was extraordinarily strong and flexible and was most commonly used to construct the knarr. Its oak frame was constructed much deeper which, when paired with a wider body, created a stable merchant ship. This adaptation allowed it to sail smoothly as well as helped it disband the harshest of ocean waves. Furthermore, the Vikings riveted overlapping planks to the hull, creating the clinker-hull which better suited it for rough waters. Thus, it was around 16 meters long (53 feet) and could carry up to 30 tons (60,000 lbs) of cargo. The final change was the implementation of the sail into Viking ship making. Due to adding sails to the knarr, it was a low maintenance ship, only needing a crew of six to manage.

In 1997, W. Hodding Carter IV had a knarr reconstructed based on historic designs, and sailed it from Greenland to Newfoundland in 1998 with a crew of nine. They found that the traditional steering oar, based on two partial examples, had to be modified by reinforcing the hull attachment and tuning the balance to achieve a controllable and durable vessel. The ship could not sail to windward. The ship is now housed in a shed in Norstead.

== Other Norse cargo ships ==
Knarr was only one name for a variety of Norse cargo ships. Some other types are:

=== Byrding ===
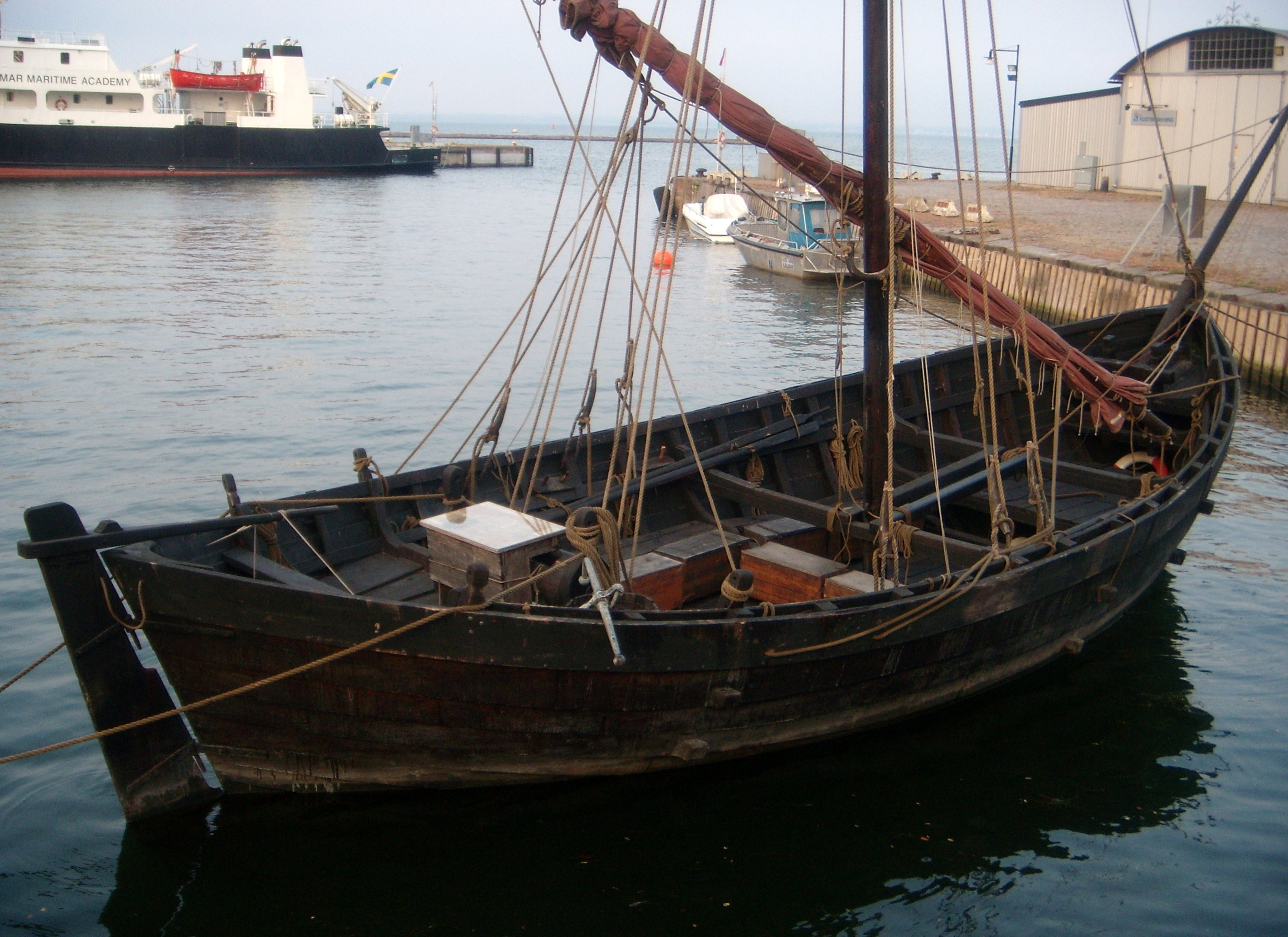
Replica of a mid 13th century byrding found in Kalmar, Sweden, featuring a sternpost-rudder instead of a Viking Age steering oar.

Byrding (Old Norse: byrðingr; Old Gutnish: byrþinger; Swedish: börding; Middle Low German: bordink, bordinge; Dutch: bording) was a smaller knarr, specifically built for handling cargo. The name probably stem from the same root as "burden", and means "carrier", in the sense of 'cargo ship' (that which carries a burden/cargo). Another possibility is an etymology to "board" (compare Swedish: trebörding, "three-boarder", fembörding, "five-boarder"), and thus maybe an old word for clinker ship.

=== Dromond ===
Dromond (Old Norse: dromund; Middle English: dromond) was a name for a really big cargo ship with high sides for mediterranean voyages. The name is derived from the Greek ship type δρόμων (dromōn) and was a term that continued into the Middle Ages. The Norse probably got this term from the Byzantine Empire through their various contacts.

=== Karve ===
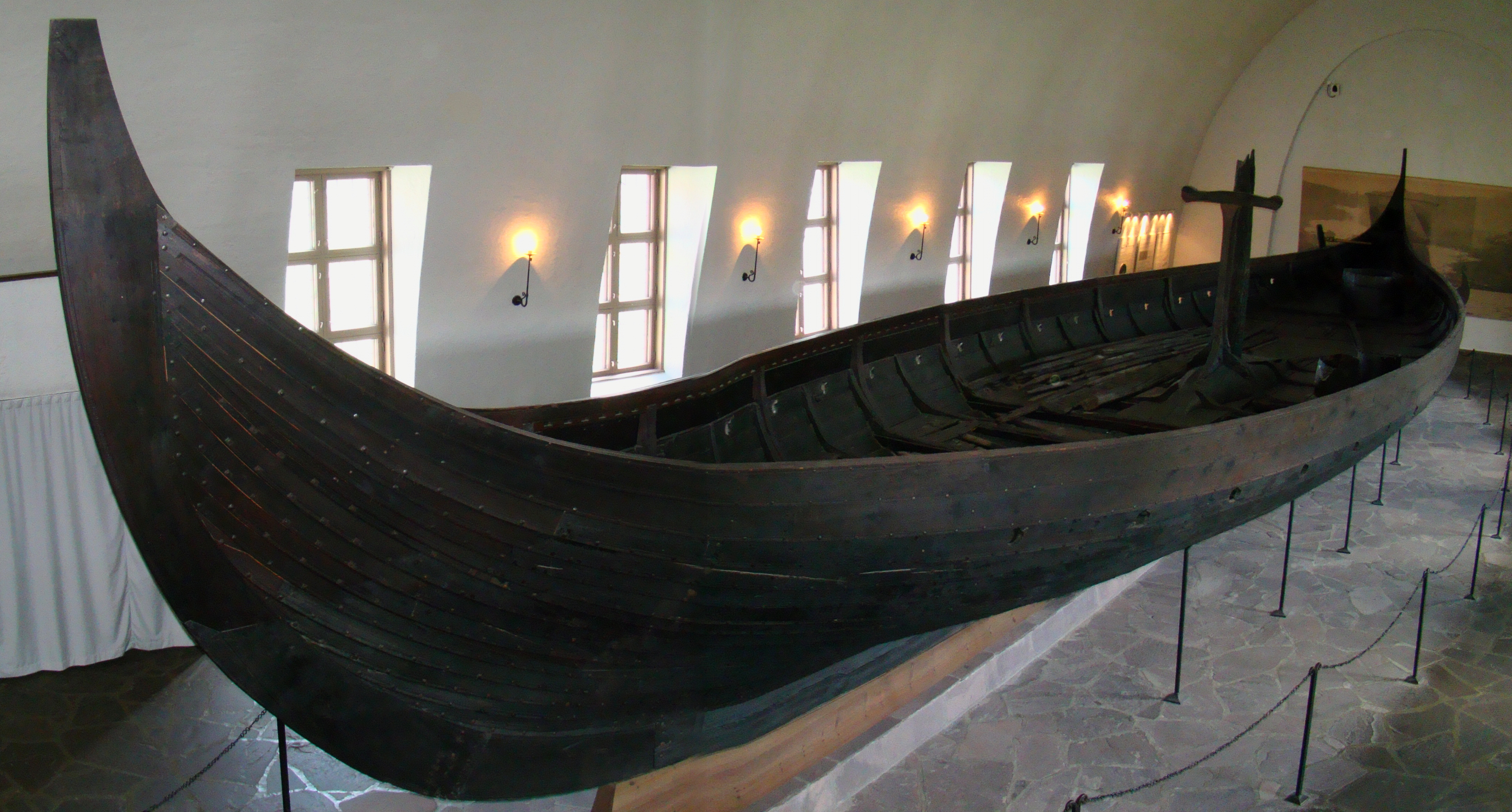
The Gokstad ship, an assumed karve. Note the raised sides.

Karve or karvi (Old Norse: karfi; Old Swedish: karve; Old East Slavic: корабль, korablĭ) was a multi-purpose workboat with high sides and a broad hull, and was partially a type of longship.

=== Kogg ===
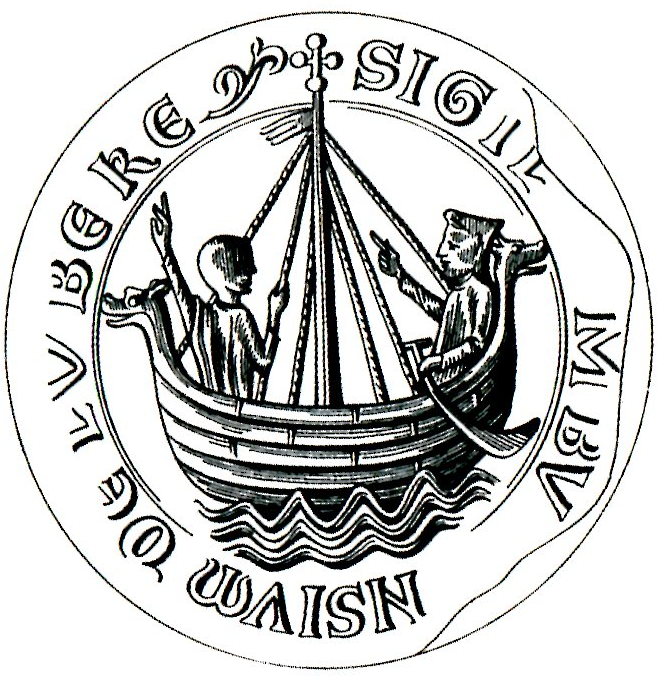
The 1223 seal of Lübeck, one of the leading cities of the Hanseatic League, depicting a Viking Age cog, with side rudder and curved stem and stern posts.

The cog or kogg (Old Norse: koggr; Old Swedish: kogger; Old High German: coccho, Middle High German: cocke; Middle Low German: kogge; Middle Dutch: kogghe; Middle English: cogge) of the Viking Age were not built akin to the later Medieval cogs, but rather according to the period Norse shipbuilding tradition with a fore and aft stem. They are described as wide and round-bowed with high-sides.

== Impact ==
Within the few written Viking records, the Saga of the Greenlanders and the Saga of Erik the Red tell an in-depth story of the Viking journey and discovery of Vinland, nowadays Newfoundland. These adventures were passed down verbally over hundreds of years until they were finally written down by an unnamed author around the 13th century. In 1960, explorer Helge Ingstad and his wife Anne Stine Ingstad, an archaeologist, used an array of tools such as the sagas and maps to discover a Viking settlement in L'Anse aux Meadows in Newfoundland. This revolutionary discovery solidified that the Vikings had made it to North America, proving the sagas held a degree of truth. Today, this area is still being investigated and there have been even more great discoveries with the use of new fieldwork technology. The knarr played a vital role during the Viking settlement at Vinland because it was one of the only ships that was able to transfer the cargo necessary to start a settlement. Thus, the knarr would have carried food, tools, livestock, and much more to this new world. Not only did it aid the settlements at Vinland but the knarr would also have carried cargo to other Norse settlements such as those at Greenland and Iceland.

=== Trade ===
Outside of the realm of discovery and settlement, the knarr ships also would have taken part in trade routes across the Viking world. From the Baltic to the North Atlantic, Viking trade routes were intricate and commonly travelled. In the Baltic, trade was possible all year, in the warm months by boat and in the winter by foot or sled. These trade routes allowed the Vikings to trade with an array of merchants from Europe to Asia. Due to the Vikings preferring to trade through rivers and seas, the knarr was a perfect candidate as it was small enough to fit most rivers most waterways. The sagas tell much of Viking travel and trade throughout the North Atlantic which furthers the idea that the knarr was an essential part of Viking culture. Trade not only connected the Vikings to the world around them but also helped their interconnectedness as a culture. Among fur, food, weapons, and more, fish trade was essential in the development of North Atlantic trade routes, with the help of the knarr.

== Excavation - Skuldelev 1 ==
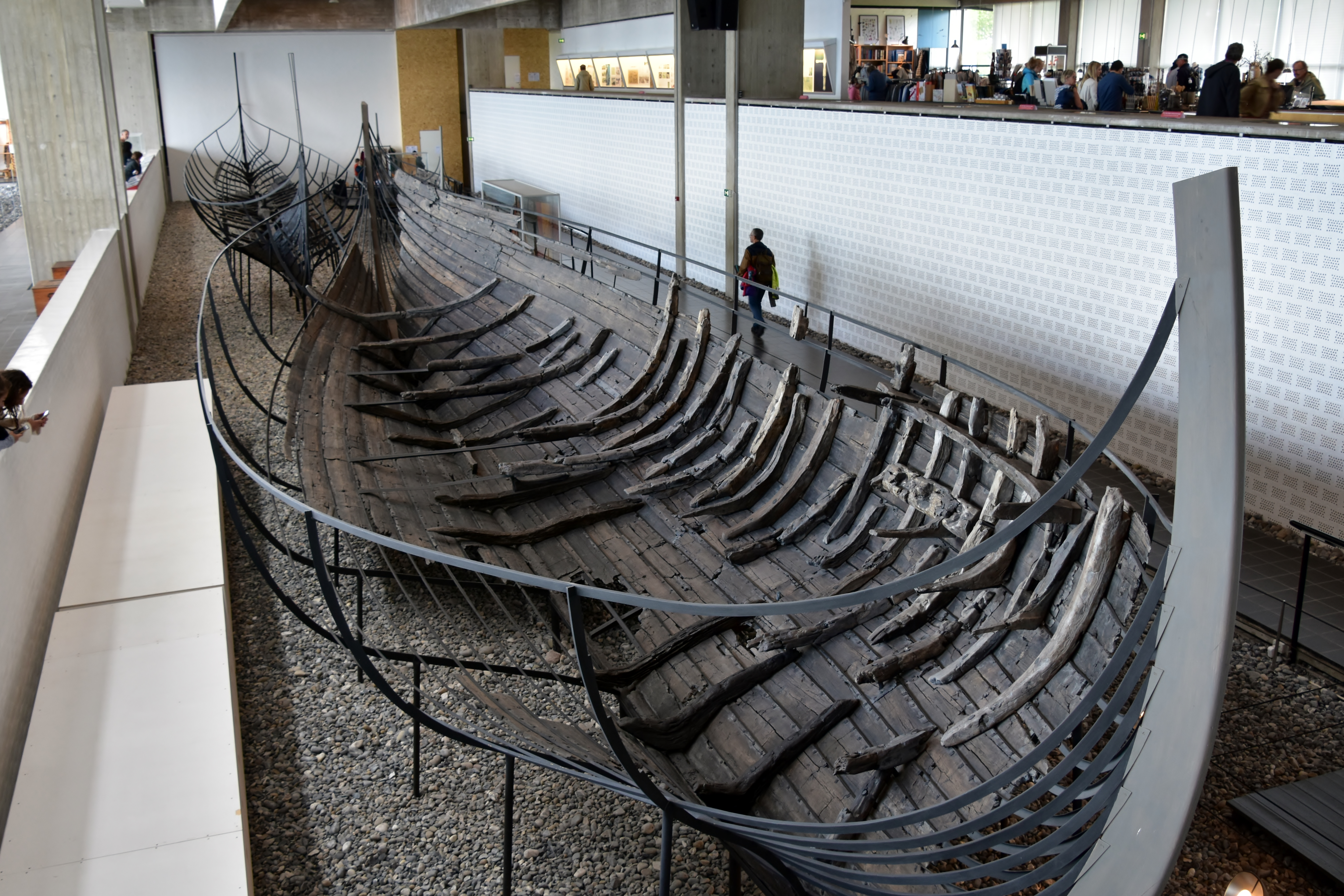
Skuldelev 1, a knarr found in Skuldelev, Denmark

In Skuldelev, Denmark in 1962, excavation began on ship wreckage that had been sitting in shallow water for centuries. Although it had been discovered years prior, the legend stated that it was the sunken ship of Queen Margaret I of Denmark, dating to the 15th century. However, the excavation proved that there were five Viking ships, none that were Queen Margarets. With a total of five sunken ships, this excavation became the first discovery of a knarr, and earned it the name Skuldelev 1. Excavation determined these boats were filled with rocks and sunk purposely to block the passageway from intruders, around the 11th century. Some scholars argue that the discovery of Skuldelev 1 does not mean each knarr matched its description. However, many historians agree that all knarrs were likely of similar size. It is estimated to have been about 16 meters long and with the ability to carry upwards of 30 tons. Currently, the Skuldelev ships reside in the Viking Ship Museum in Roskilde, Denmark.

== Knarr finds ==
- Skuldelev 1
- Äskekärr ship

== See also ==
- Medieval ships

== Other sources ==
- Greenhill, Basil (1976) Archaeology of the Boat (London: Adam and Charles Black Publishers Ltd) ISBN 978-0-7136-1645-3
- Harrison, Mark (2006) The Vikings, Voyagers of Discovery and Plunder (Osprey Publishing) ISBN 978-1-84603-340-7
- Crumlin-Pedersen, Ole (1997) Viking-Age Ships and Shipbuilding in Hedeby (Viking Ship Museum, Roskilde) ISBN 978-87-85180-30-8
