= Viking Ship Museum =

Viking Ship Museum may refer to:

- Viking Ship Museum (Oslo)
- Viking Ship Museum (Roskilde)

== See also ==
- Viking ship replica
- Viking ships
- Viking (disambiguation)
