= Viking ship =

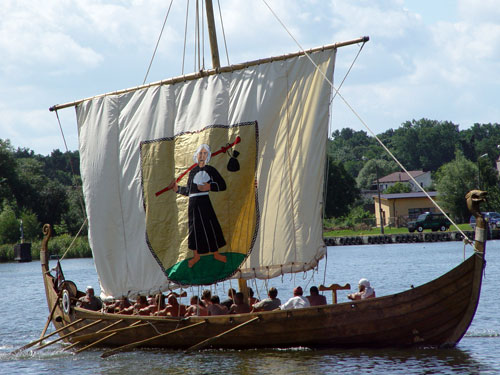
A modern replica of a Viking ship. This ship is of the snekkja longship type.

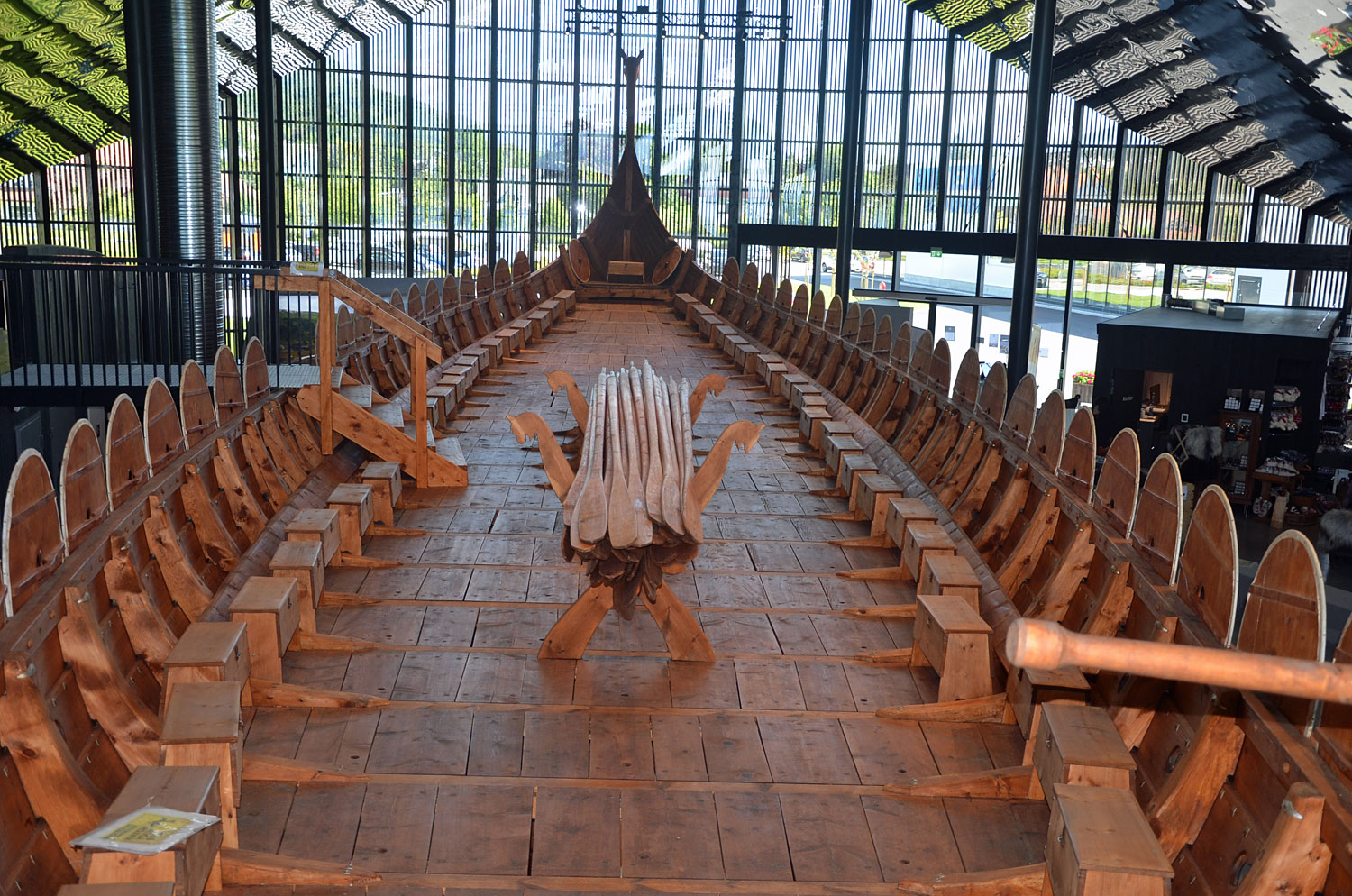
The deck of the Myklebust ship inside Sagastad in Nordfjordeid

Viking ships were marine vessels of unique structure, used in Scandinavia throughout the Middle Ages. The boat-types were quite varied, depending on what the ship was intended for, but they were generally characterized as being slender and flexible boats, with symmetrical ends with true keel. They were clinker built, which is the overlapping of planks riveted together. Some might have had a dragon's head or other circular object protruding from the bow and stern for design, although this is only inferred from historical sources. Viking ships were used both for military purposes and for long-distance trade, exploration and colonization.

Viking ship pictured in the coat of arms of Saare County, Estonia

In the literature, Viking ships are usually seen divided into two broad categories: merchant ships and warships, the latter resembling narrow "war canoes" with less load capacity but higher speed. However, these categories are overlapping; some transport ships would also form part of war fleets. As a rule, ship lanes in Scandinavia followed coastal waters, hence a majority of vessels were of a lighter design, while a few types, such as the knarr, could navigate the open ocean. The ship's shallow draft allowed navigation in waters only one meter deep and permitted beach landings, while its light weight enabled it to be carried over portages. The Viking ships ranged from the Baltic Sea to far from the Scandinavian homelands, to Iceland, the Faroe Islands, Greenland, Newfoundland, the Mediterranean, the Black Sea and Africa.

== Development ==
The ship has been functioning as the centerpiece of Scandinavian culture for centuries, serving both pragmatic and religious purposes, and its importance was already deeply rooted in the Scandinavian culture when the Viking Age began. Scandinavia is a region with relatively high inland mountain ranges and dense forests, making inland travel hazardous and cumbersome. In contrast most communities had easy access to natural ports and the coastal sea lanes; consequently, trade was primarily conducted as coastal shipping. Many stone engravings from the Nordic Stone Age and in particular the Nordic Bronze Age, depict ships in various situations, and valuable ships were sacrificed as part of ceremonial votive offerings since at least the Nordic Iron Age, as evidenced by the Hjortspring and Nydam boats.

The Viking Age saw the first local developments of trading ports into forts and coastal towns, all of which were deeply dependent on the North Sea and the Baltic Sea for survival and growth. Control of the waterways was of great economical and political importance, and consequently, ships were in high demand. The Hedeby coins, among the earliest known Danish currency, have impressions of ships as emblems, showing the importance of naval vessels in the area.

== Knarr ==
Knarr is the Norse term for ships that were built for cargo transport. The ships were generally about 54 feet (16 m) long with a beam of 15 feet (4.6 m), a displacement of 50 tons, and capable of carrying up to 24 tons. The knarr was shorter than the Gokstad type of longships, but knarrs were sturdier by design and depended mostly on sail-power, only putting oars to use as auxiliaries if there was no wind on the open water. The knarr was used for longer voyages, ocean-going transports and more hazardous trips than the Gokstad type. It was capable of sailing 75 miles (121 km) in one day and held a crew of about 20–30. Knarrs routinely crossed the North Atlantic in the Viking Age, carrying livestock and goods to and from Greenland and the North Atlantic islands. The design of the knarr later influenced the design of the cog, used in the Baltic Sea by the Hanseatic League. Examples of Viking Age knarr are Skuldelev 1, which was excavated in Denmark in 1962 and is believed to be from about 1030 AD, and the Äskekärr ship, which was found in Sweden in 1933 and is believed to be from about 930.

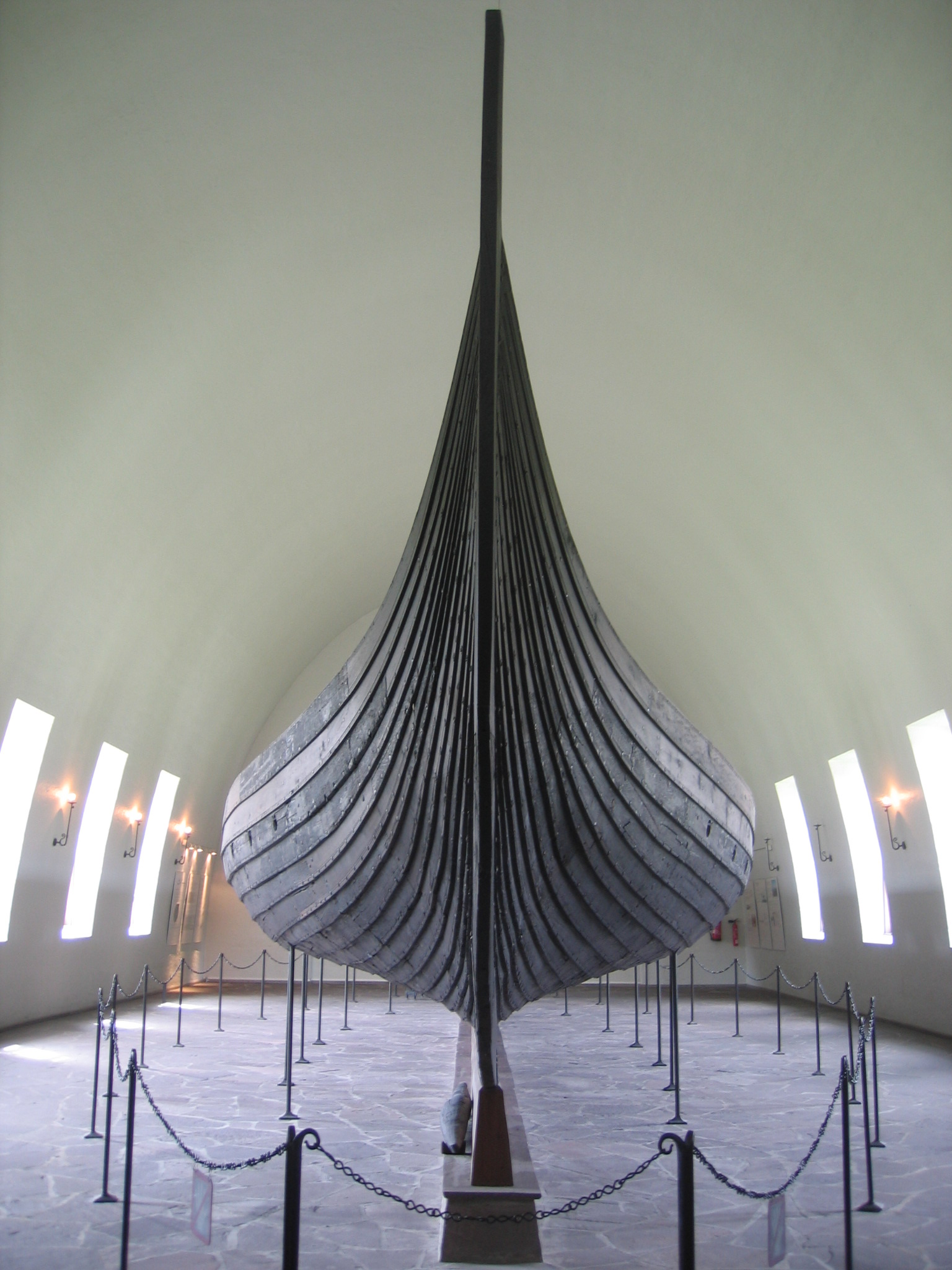
The Gokstad ship, on display at the Viking Ship Museum in Oslo, Norway

== Karve ==
The karve was a small type of Viking longship with a broad hull somewhat similar to the knarr. They were used for both war and ordinary transport, carrying people, cargo or livestock. Because they were able to navigate in very shallow water, they were also used for coasting. Karves typically had broad beams of approximately 17 feet (5.2 m).

== Ship construction ==
Viking ships varied from other contemporary ships, being generally more seaworthy and lighter. This was achieved through use of clinker (lapstrake) construction of the hull. The planks on Viking vessels were riven (split) from large, old-growth trees—especially oak—as a riven plank is stronger than the sawn plank found in later craft. A single strake (plank) could be as thin as one inch (2.5 cm), resulting in a strong yet supple hull. Working up from a stout oaken keel and ribs, shipwrights fastened strakes to the keel and stem and joined them with iron nails whose ends were hammered over a roves, or washers, to hold them in place. Each tier of planking overlapped the one below, and a caulking of tarred rope was used between planks to create a waterproof hull. The ships were strengthened structurally with crossbeams riding on top of each of the long floor timbers. The mast was supported by a keelson, a heavy timber block placed on top of the keel.

Remarkably large vessels could be constructed using traditional clinker construction. Dragon ships carrying 100 warriors were not uncommon. During the early Viking Age, oar ports replaced rowlocks, allowing oars to be stored while the ship was under sail to provide better angles for rowing. The largest ships of the era could travel five to six knots using oar power and up to ten knots under sail. Warships such as the skeid and the snekka were built with shallow drafts and equipped with sails. This combination endowed them with exceptional maneuvering capabilities and enabled them to land on beaches and sail up rivers.

== Navigation ==
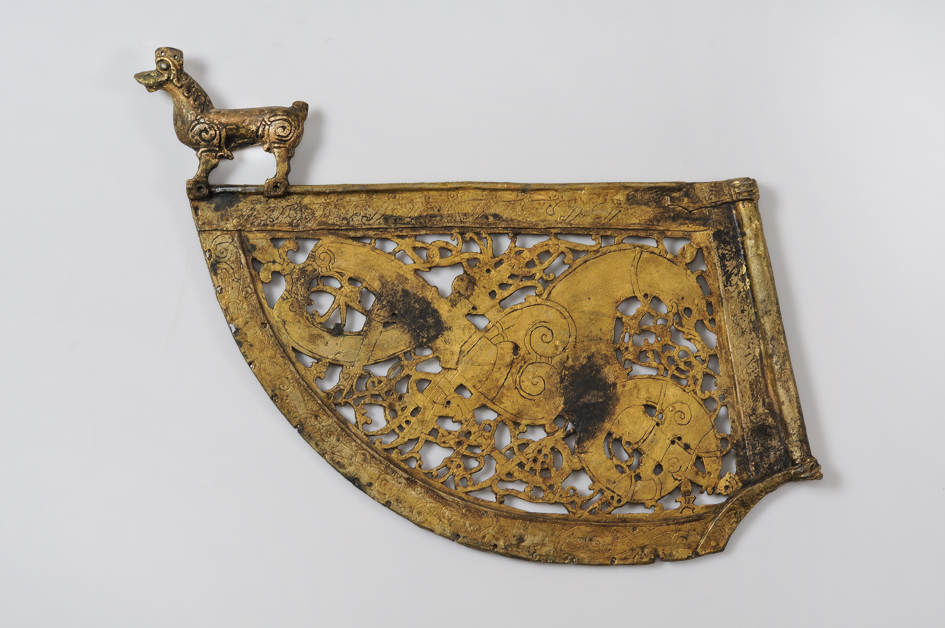
The Söderala vane, presumably once used on a Viking ship

With such technological improvements, the Vikings began to make more and more ocean voyages, as their ships were more seaworthy. However, in order to sail in ocean waters, the Vikings needed to develop methods of relatively precise navigation. Most commonly, a ship's pilot drew on traditional knowledge to set the ship's course. Essentially, the Vikings simply used prior familiarity with tides, sailing times, and landmarks in order to route courses. For example, scholars contend that the sighting of a whale allowed the Vikings to determine the direction of a ship. Because whales feed in highly nutritious waters, commonly found in regions where landmasses have pushed deep-water currents towards shallower areas, the sighting of a whale functioned as a signal that land was near.

Viking sagas routinely tell of voyages where Vikings suffered from being "hafvilla" (bewildered)—voyages beset by fog or bad weather, where they completely lost their sense of direction. This description suggests they did not use a sunstone when the sun was obscured. Moreover, the fact that this same bewilderment could arise when the winds died suggests that the Vikings relied on prevailing winds to navigate, as expected if their skills depended principally on traditional knowledge.

Some academics have proposed that the Vikings also developed more advanced aids to navigation, such as the use of a sun compass. A wooden half-disc found on the shores of Narsarsuaq, Greenland initially seemed to support this hypothesis. However, further investigation of the object revealed that the slits inscribed in the disc are disproportionately spaced, and so the object could not in fact function as an accurate compass. It has been suggested that the instrument is instead a "confession disc" used by priests to count the number of confessions in their parish.

Similarly, researchers and historians continually debate the use of the sunstone in Viking navigation. Because a sunstone is able to polarize light, it is a plausible method for determining direction. By showing which direction light waves are oscillating, the sunstone has the potential to show the sun's position even when the sun is obscured by clouds. The stone changes to a certain color based on the direction of the light waves, but only when the object is held in an area with direct sunlight. Thus, most scholars debate the reliability and the plausibility of using a navigational tool that can only determine direction in such limited conditions.

== Ship design ==
Viking ships were not only tools for navigation but also cultural symbols with high artistic design value. The carvings on Viking ships are known for their intricate geometric patterns, mythological creatures, and symbolic designs, primarily found on the bow, stern, and other wooden elements. These carvings were embodied the Vikings' cultural and religious beliefs. Common patterns and themes include animal motifs, geometric designs, mythological scenes, and inscriptions.

=== Animal motifs ===
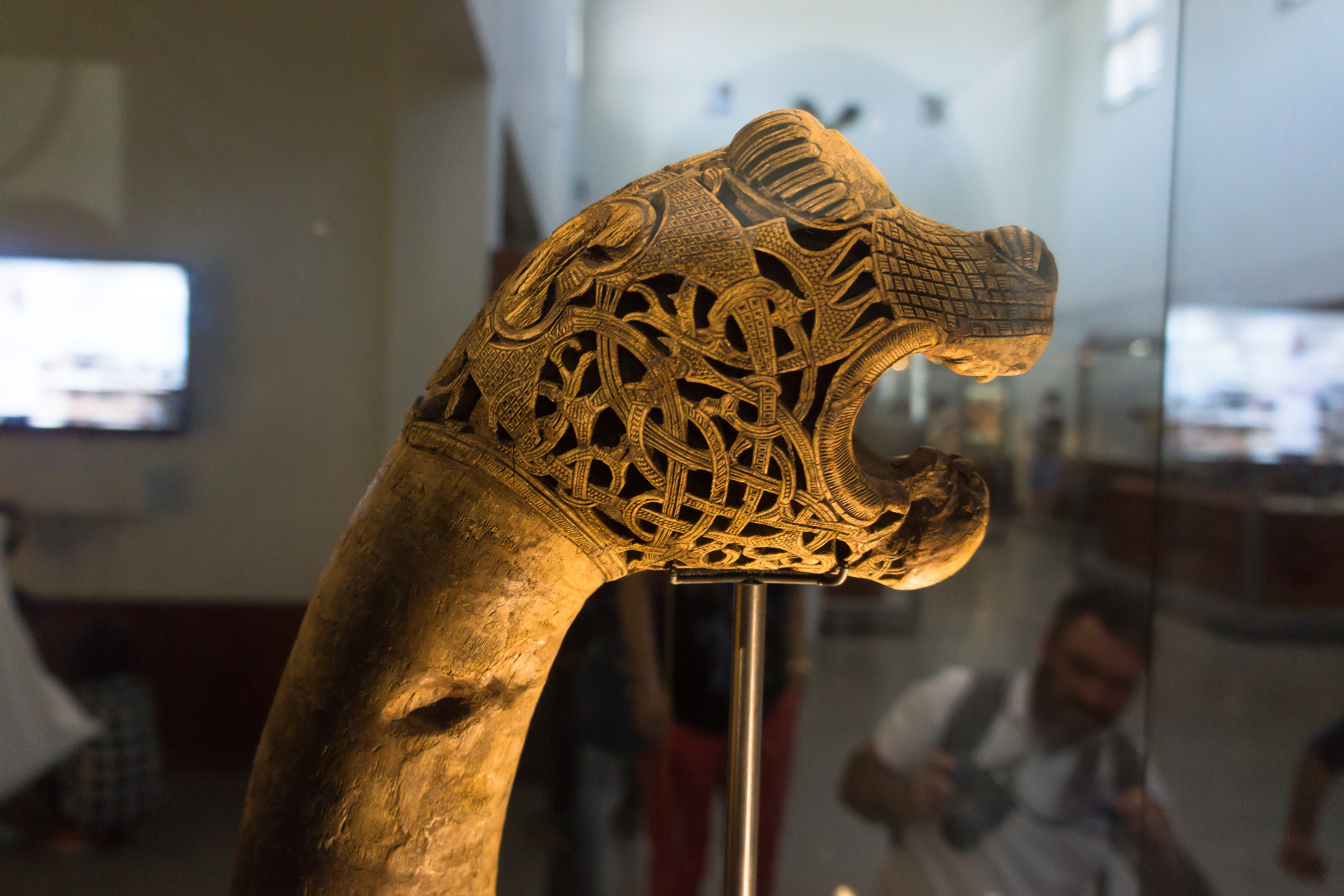
Animal head post found in burial mound near Tønsberg (Oseberg ship burial), 9th century, Oseberg style, wood and paint (no longer existing)

Many ships had intricately carved dragon heads or other mythical creatures on the bow and stern. These carvings served as a means to intimidate enemies and protect the sailors during their journeys. The quality and intricate design of the ship indicated the resources invested by its owner. Viking lords and nobles used large, elaborately carved ships to showcase their social status. Thus, ships were symbols of family identity. Possessing a well-carved ship symbolized a family's wealth and influence, highlighting their place in Viking society.

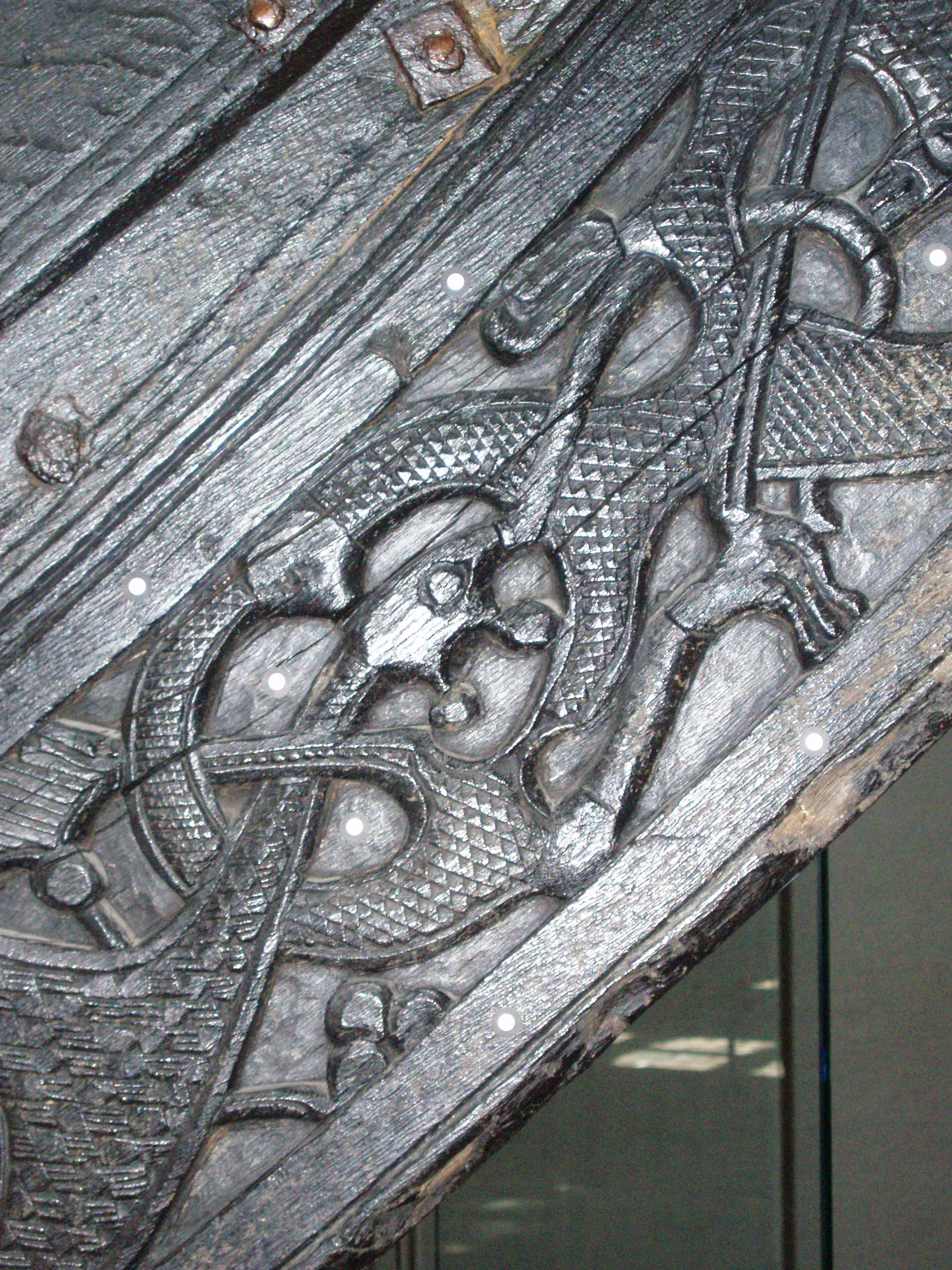
Part of the interlocking animal motif on the bow of the Oseberg Ship.

In some archaeological discoveries, experts found that the hulls of ships were adorned with rich patterns, such as intertwining vines, geometric shapes, or animal totems. These patterns are filled with symbolic meanings, many of which can be traced back to Viking mythology and belief systems. The Oseberg ship, for example, has an interlocking animal motif on its bow: a ribbon-animal, gripping beasts (strong, lively animals depicted with gripping feet and a frontal view of their heads) rendered with humanoid heads, and more ambiguous forms that echo the bodies of creatures seen at the prow. This is called the Oseberg Style, which is the first phase of the development of the Viking aesthetic, prominent from 775 to 850.

A monk at the St. Omér monastery in Flanders in about 1040 wrote a detailed description of Viking ships, focusing on their elaborate decoration and the fleet's formation. His account mentions that the Viking chieftains' ships were distinguished by the design of the bow, including gold figures of lions, wind-vanes of birds at the top of the mast, drakes spewing fire, bulls and dolphins in bronze, and human beings in silver and gold. The ships' sides were painted in vibrant colors and adorned with wood carvings, particularly the king's vessel, which was the most intricately decorated. This passage serves as valuable evidence of the Vikings' investment in ship artistry as a reflection of power, wealth, and rank. The choice of metal animal motifs and the intricate designs on prominent vessels reveal how these ships were not only functional but also designed to display status and intimidate.

== Ship burial ==
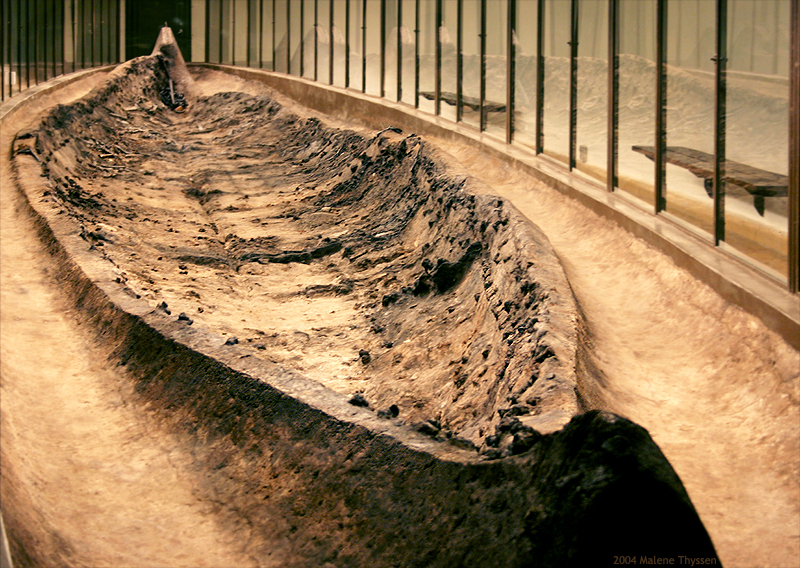
The Ladby ship is part of a ship burial that has been preserved where it was discovered, with a museum built around it

Prominent men or women in Norse society sometimes received a ship burial. The body of the deceased would be prepared and dressed in fine clothes and then be transported to the burial-place in a wagon drawn by horses. The deceased would be placed on the ship, along with many prized possessions. Horses, dogs and occasionally thralls and households might also be sacrificially killed and buried with the deceased. The origin and meaning of these customs remain unknown. Several examples of Viking ship burials have been excavated, e.g. the Oseberg ship in Norway (containing the remains of two women), the Gokstad ship in Norway, and the Ladby ship in Denmark.

There are literary sources such as the Norse Skjoldunga Saga and the Ynglinga Saga which describe more literal "ship burials" in which the deceased and goods are placed on a boat in the water and the vessel is launched into the sea, sometimes being shot with burning arrows and vanishing into the night, ablaze. Nothcotte Toller, however, states:

Whether such fiery funerals ever actually took place is impossible to know; but it is much more difficult to imagine that a king's body and accompanying treasures would have been simply pushed out to sea, where they would have been in danger of returning, or of falling into the hands of strangers or even enemies who might maltreat the one and plunder the other.

Burial of ships is an ancient tradition in Scandinavia, stretching back to at least the Nordic Iron Age, as evidenced by the Hjortspring boat (400–300 BC) or the Nydam boats (200–450 AD), for example. Ships and bodies of water have held major spiritual importance in the Norse cultures since at least the Nordic Bronze Age.

== Preserved ships ==
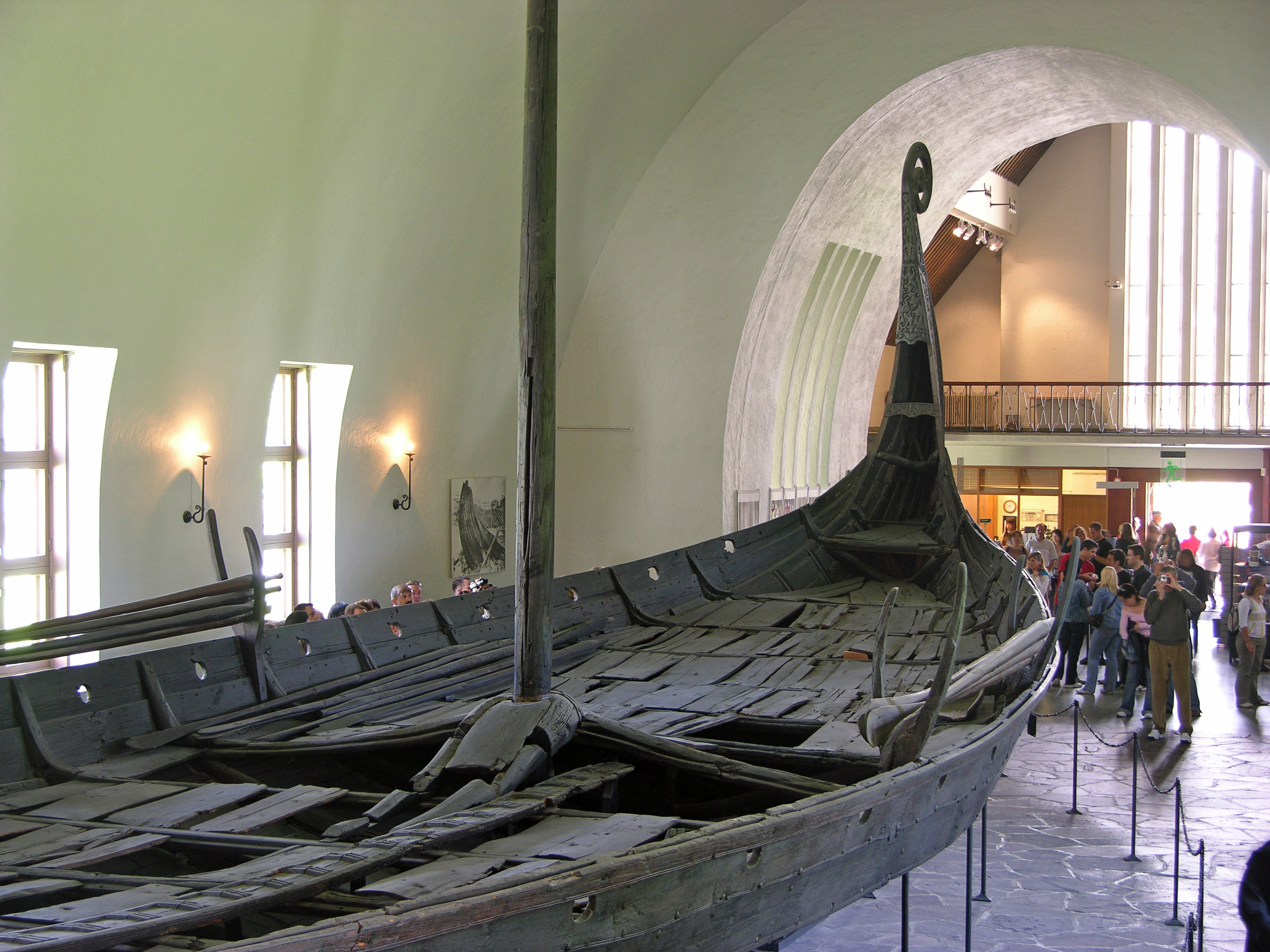
The remains of the Oseberg Ship, now located in the Viking Ship Museum (Oslo)

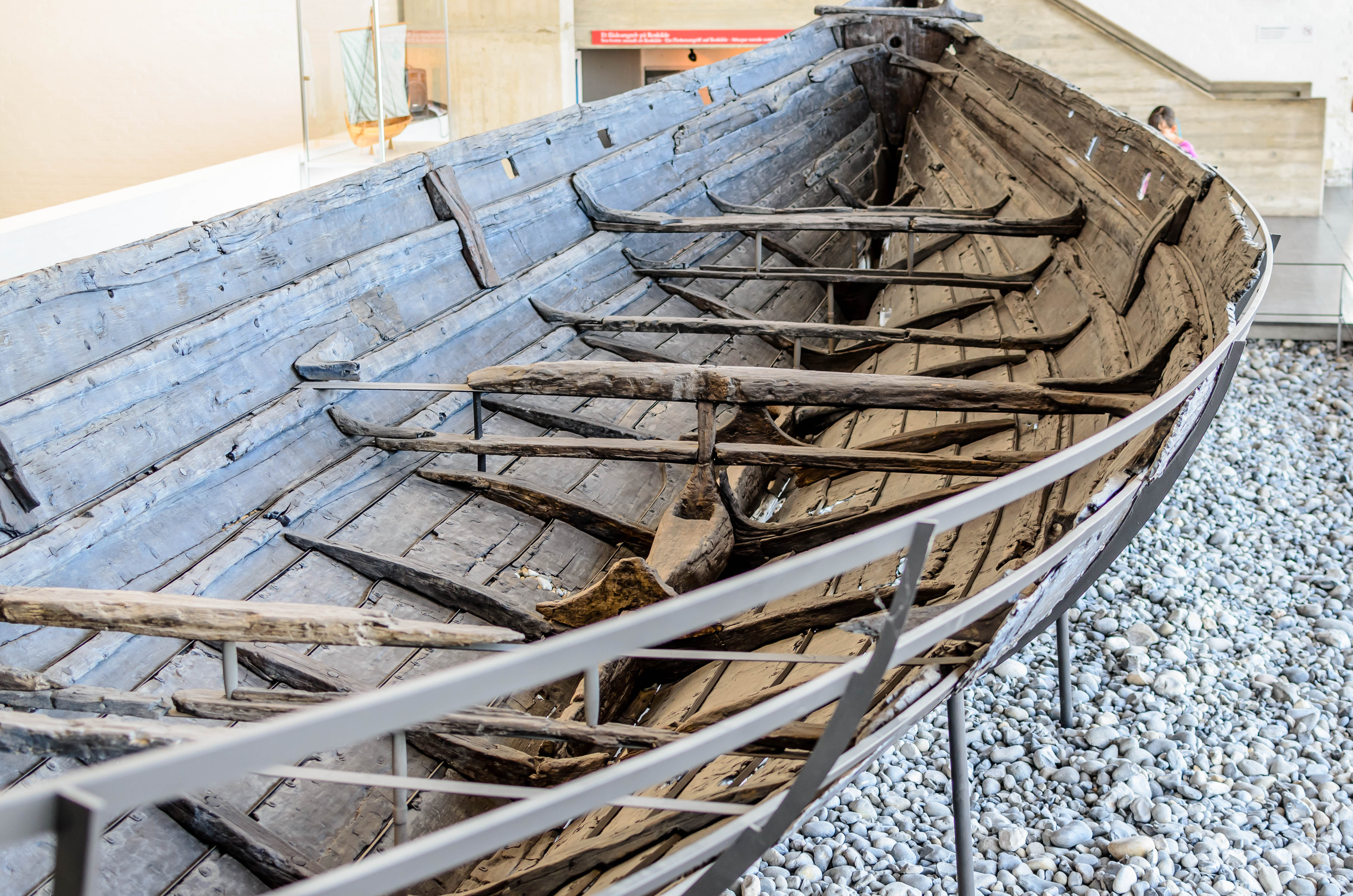
The remains of Skuldelev 3 in the Viking Ship Museum (Roskilde)

Several original Viking ships have been found through the ages, but only a few have been relatively intact. The most notable of these few ships include:

- Gokstad ship: overall length – approximately 23.3 m (76 ft)
- Oseberg ship: overall length – approximately 21.5 m (71 ft)
- Skuldelev ships: five ships found at the same location, from about 11.2 to 30 m (37 to 98 ft) long
- Tune ship: may have been up to 18.7 m (61 ft) long

Examples of other Viking ships, including some that are relatively well-preserved and some, where only very small parts remain:

- Äskekärr ship
- Gjellestad ship burial: about 23–24 m (75–79 ft) long (excavation ongoing as of June 2020)
- Hedeby 1: estimated about 26–32 m (85–105 ft) long
- Kvalsund ship
- Ladby ship
- Myklebust Ship
- Roskilde 6: found during the expansion of the Viking Ship Museum and the longest known Viking ship at about 37 m (121 ft)

Ships that have been regarded as Viking ships but are from before or after the Viking Age:

- Salme ships: from 700 to 750 AD
- Lapuri ship: from 1250 to 1300 AD

== Replicas ==
Viking, the first Viking ship replica, was built by the Rødsverven shipyard in Sandefjord, Norway. In 1893 it sailed across the Atlantic Ocean to Chicago for the World's Columbian Exposition. There are a considerable number of modern reconstructions of Viking Age ships in service around Northern Europe and North America. The Viking Ship Museum in Roskilde, Denmark, has been particularly prolific in building accurate reconstructions of archaeological finds in its collection.

== See also ==
- Birlinn
- Galley
- Ships in Norse mythology
