= Viking Ship Museum (Roskilde) =

Coordinates: 55°39′0.5″N 12°4′44.2″E

- Vikingeskibsmuseet
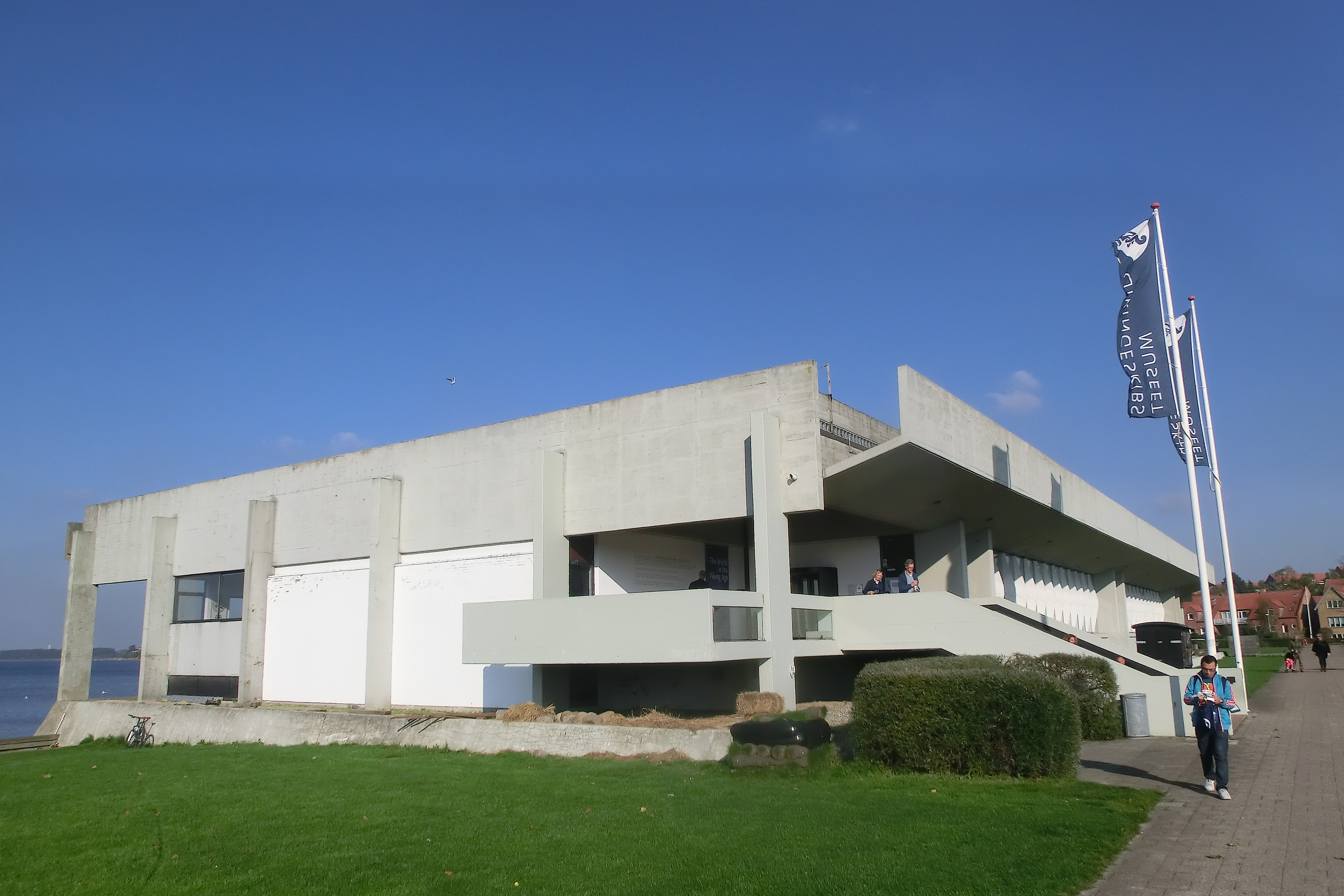
- The Viking Ship Museum
- Established: 1969
- Location: Vindeboder 12, 4000 Roskilde; Denmark
- Type: Maritime history museum, archaeological museum
- Collection size: Skuldelev ships
- Director: Tinna Damgård-Sørensen
- Website: Viking Ship Museum

The Viking Ship Museum (Danish: Vikingeskibsmuseet) in Roskilde is Denmark's national ship museum for ships of the prehistoric and medieval period.

The main focus of the museum is a permanent exhibition of the Skuldelev ships, five original Viking ships excavated nearby in 1962. The Viking Ship Museum also conducts research and educates researchers in the fields of maritime history, marine archaeology and experimental archaeology. Various academic conferences are held here and there is a research library in association with the museum.

== Original Viking ships ==
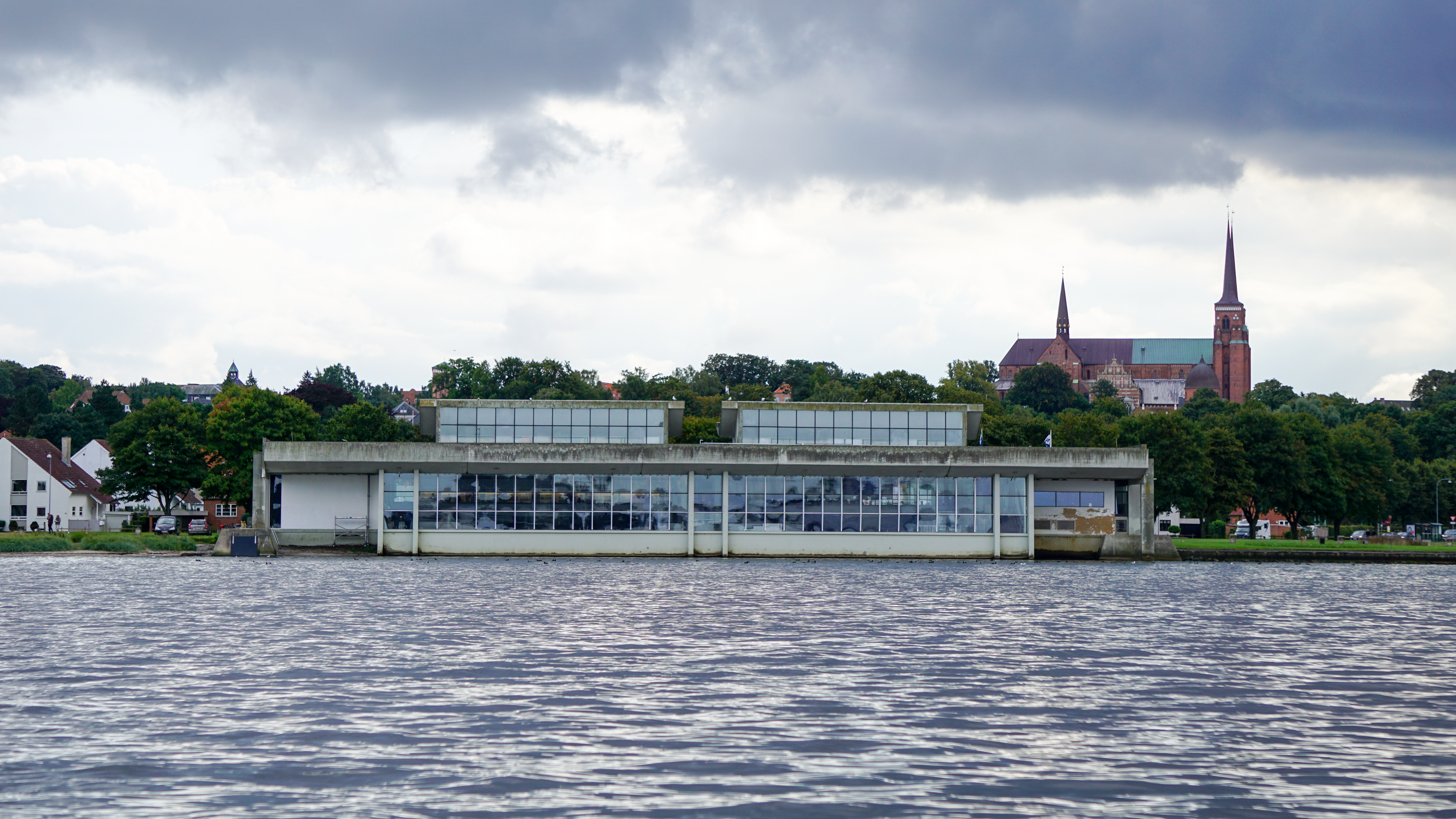
Waterside of the Viking Ship Museum as seen from Roskilde Fjord

Around the year 1070, five Viking ships were deliberately sunk at Skuldelev in Roskilde Fjord in order to block the most important fairway and to protect Roskilde from an enemy attack from the sea. These ships, later known as the Skuldelev ships, were excavated in 1962. They turned out to be five different types of ships ranging from cargo ships to ships of war.

The Viking Ship Museum overlooking the inlet of Roskilde Fjord was built in 1969 with the main purpose of exhibiting the five newly discovered Skuldelev ships.

The original Skuldelev Viking ships are the main focus of the museum, but a small exhibition about the Roskilde ships and various temporary exhibitions with a broader scope can also be experienced here.

== Roskilde ships ==
In the late 1990s, excavations for the shipyard expansion of the Viking Ship Museum uncovered the remains of a further nine ships, the Roskilde ships, from the medieval period. It is the largest such discovery of ships in Northern Europe. Most of these are from the period just after the Viking Age, 1060-1350 AD, but Roskilde 6 is from 1025 AD and is the longest Viking ship ever found; about 37 m (121 ft) long. All except Roskilde 8 have been excavated and their remains are at the National Museum of Denmark (Roskilde 6 on display, remaining in storage).

== Reconstructed Viking ships and historical boats ==
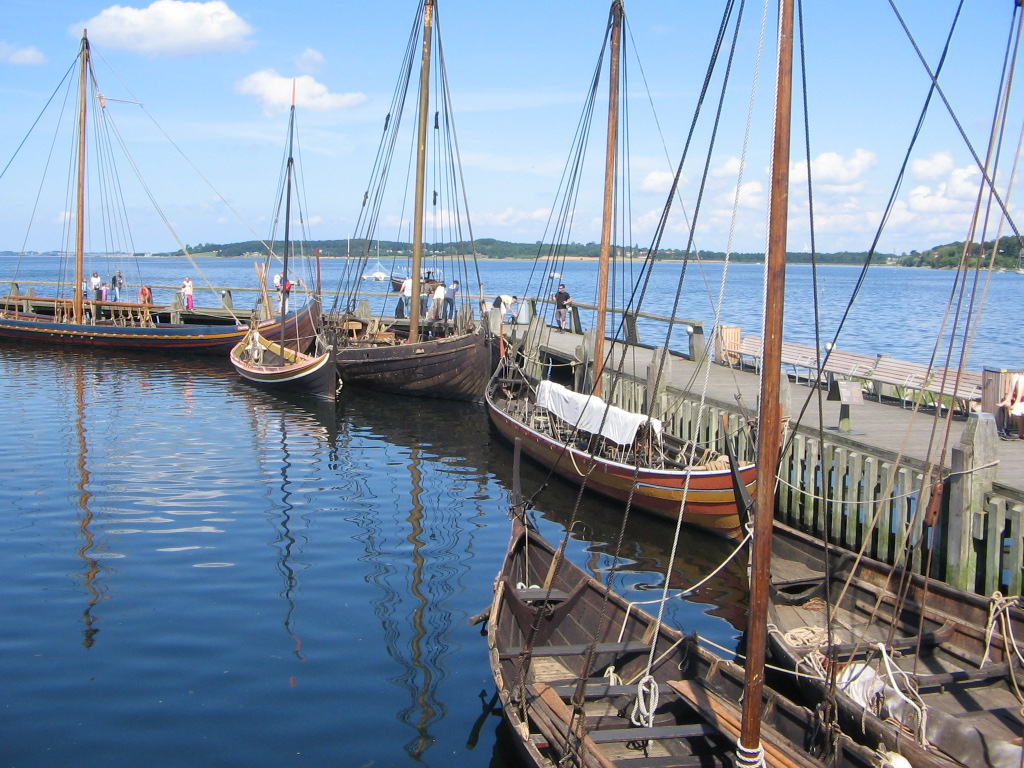
The Viking Ship Museum possess a large collection of authentic historic boats and reconstructions from all over Scandinavia.

The Viking Ship Museum has a long tradition of Viking ship reconstructions and boat building and also collects boats of interest from all over Scandinavia. The boat collection at the museum now comprise more than 40 vessels and the associated ship building yard is constantly building new ships by original methods as part of an experimental archaeology learning process. It is possible to follow or engage in the ship building process here. The shipyard is located on a small isle known as Museumsøen (Museum Island), connected to the main museum exhibition buildings by a drawbridge.

Every summer, a handful of boats are launched for extended sea voyages to accumulate more knowledge about the seafaring techniques and conditions of the Vikings.

== Gallery ==
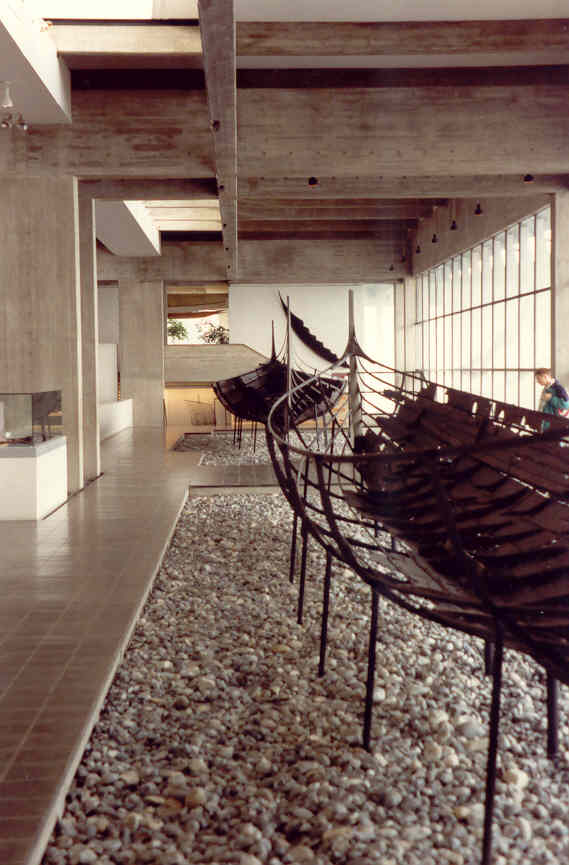
A look down the halls

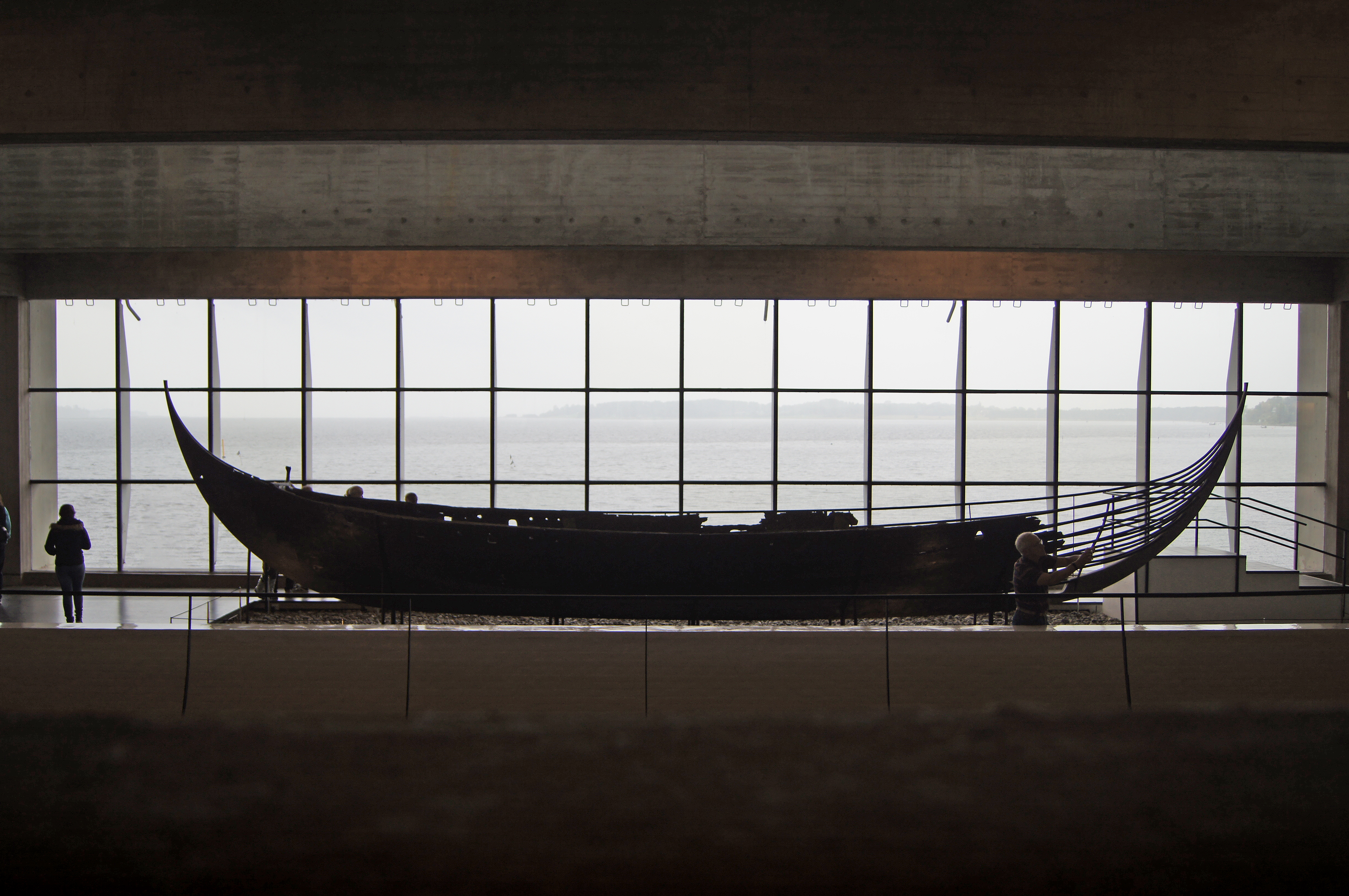
Silhouette of an original Viking ship

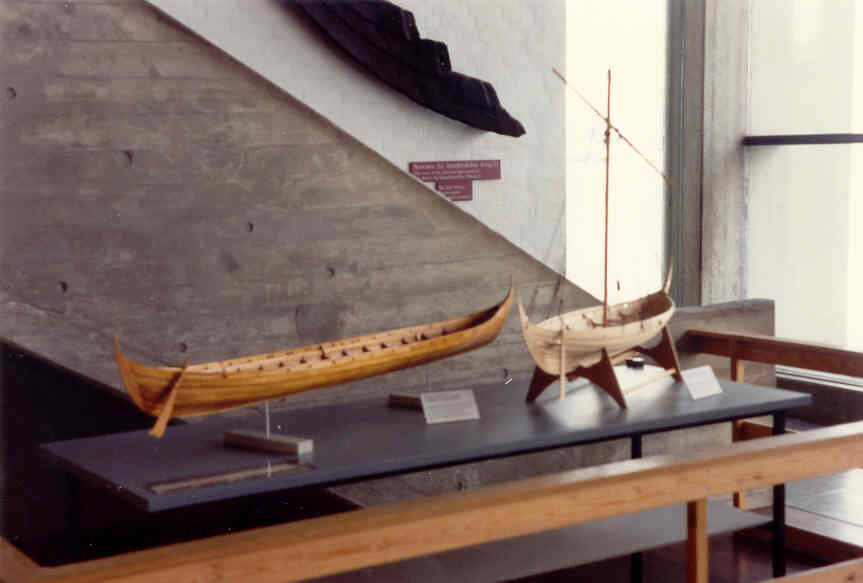
Small scale replicas

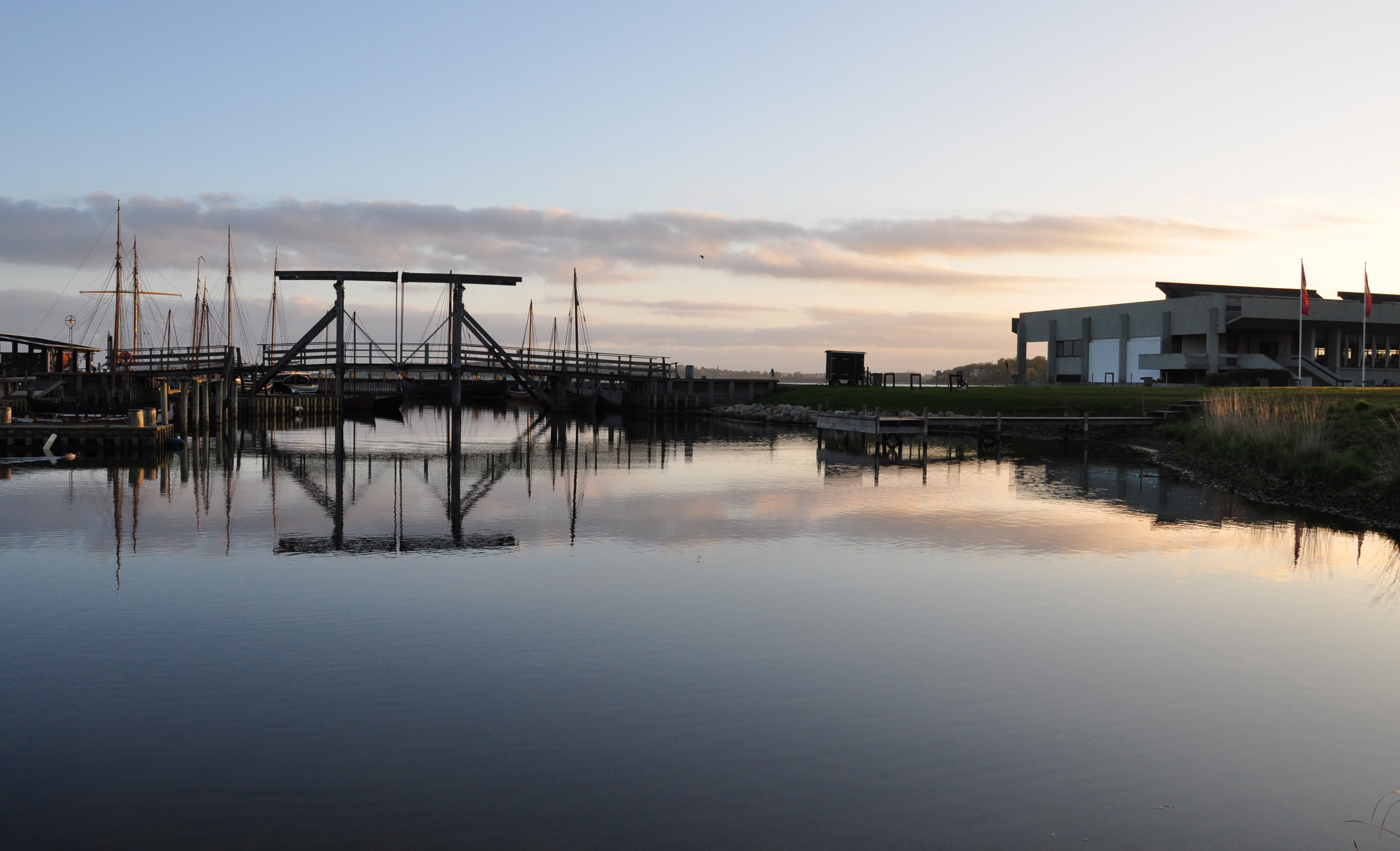
The bridge to the shipyard of Museumsøen

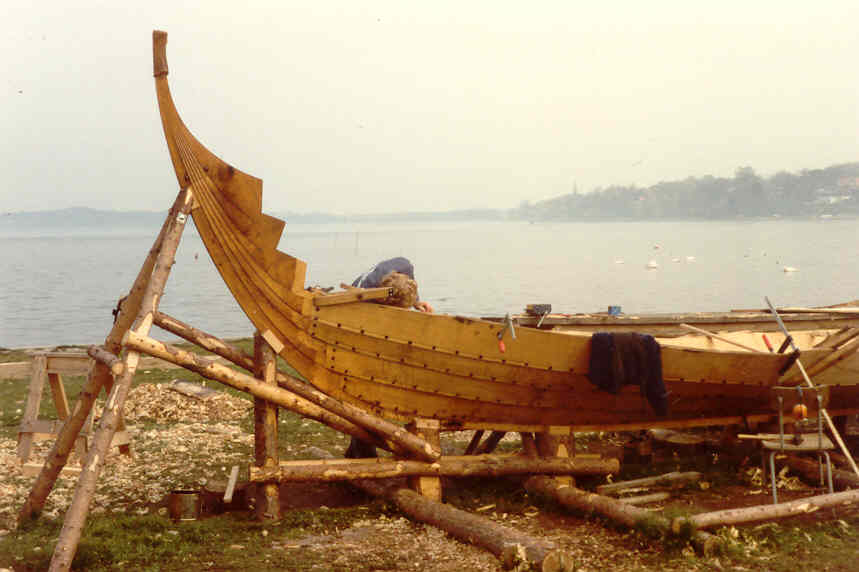
The reconstruction of Skuldelev 5 (1991)

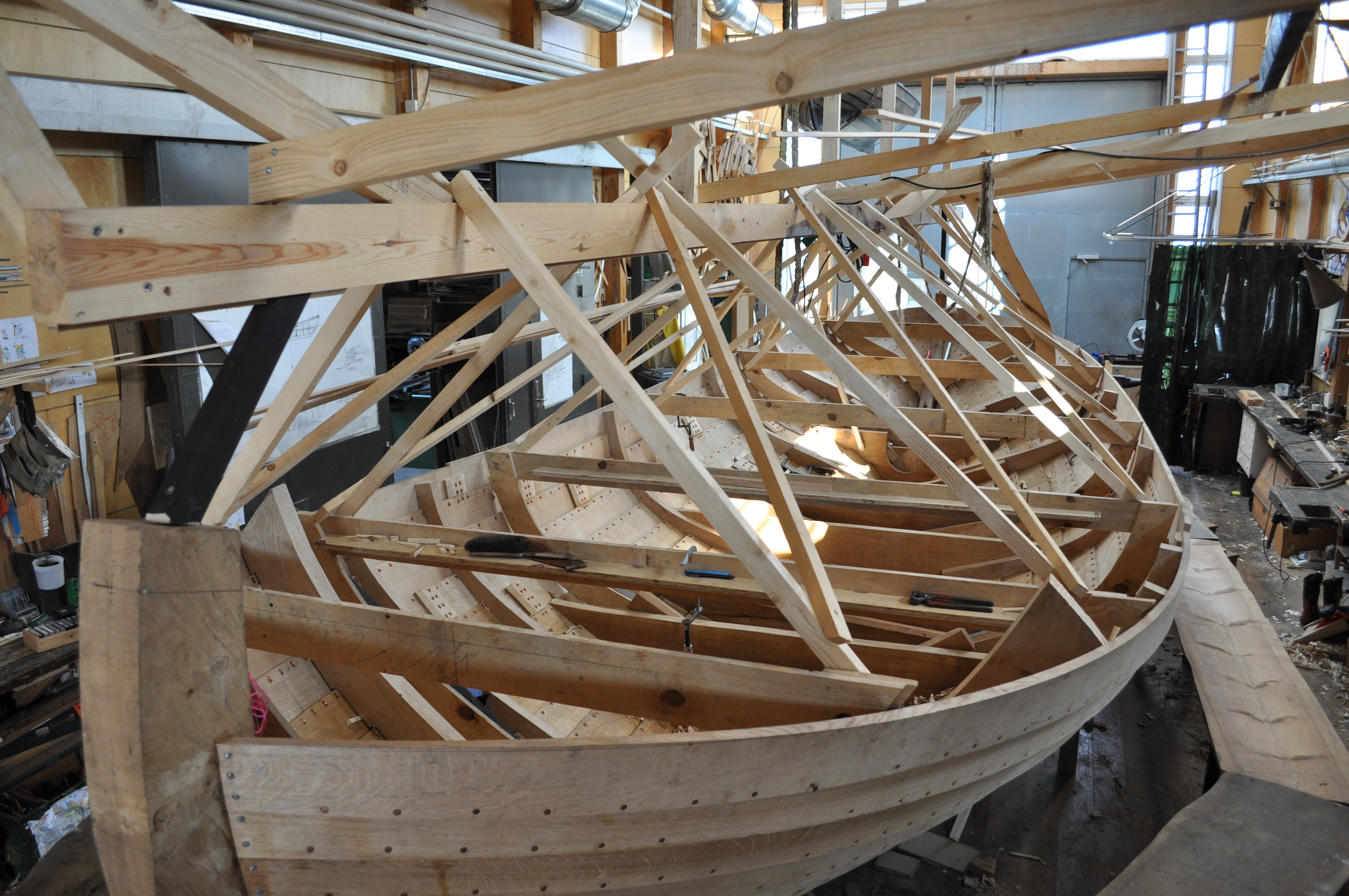
Boat building at the workshops

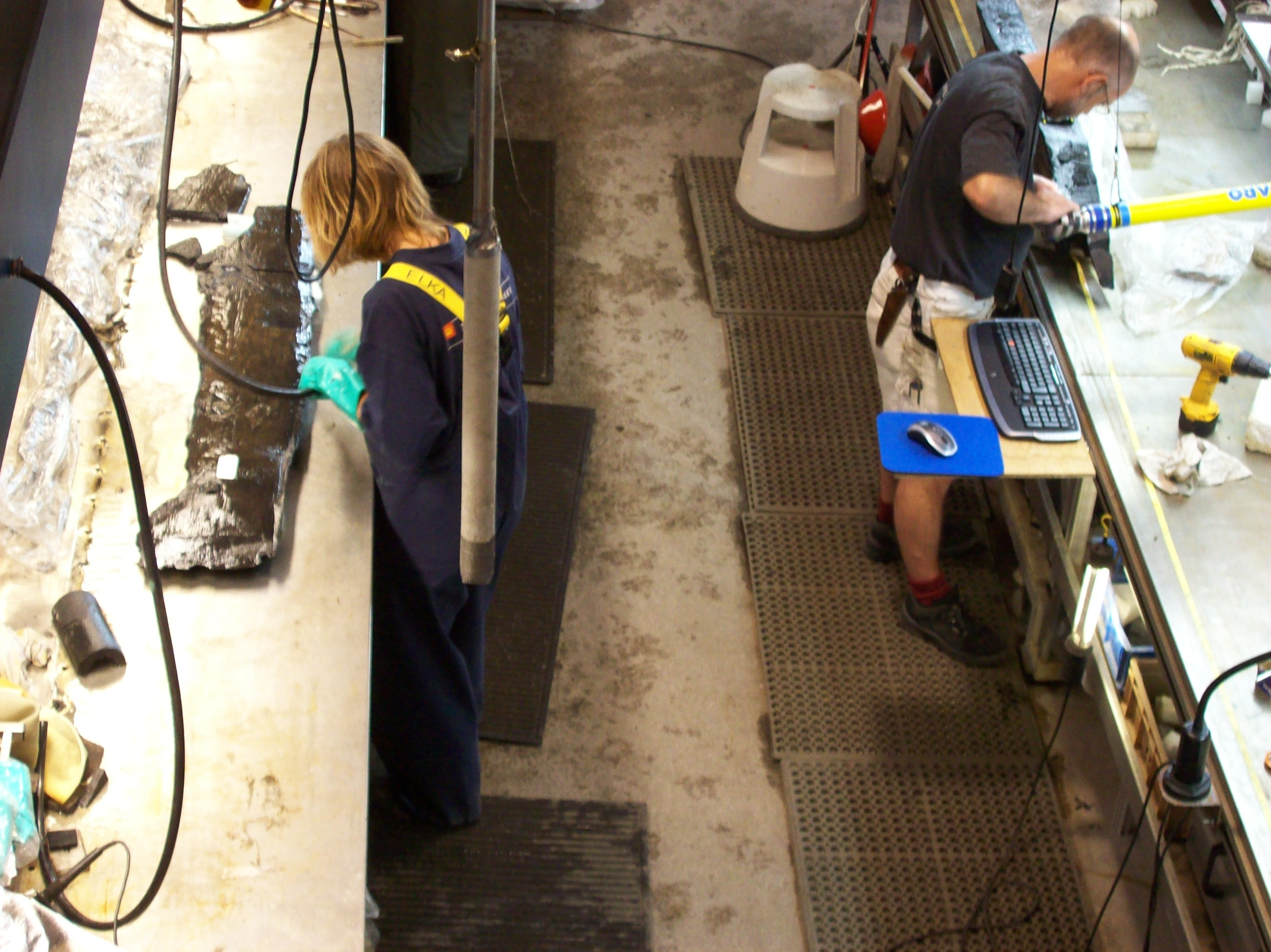
Preservation of archaeological remains

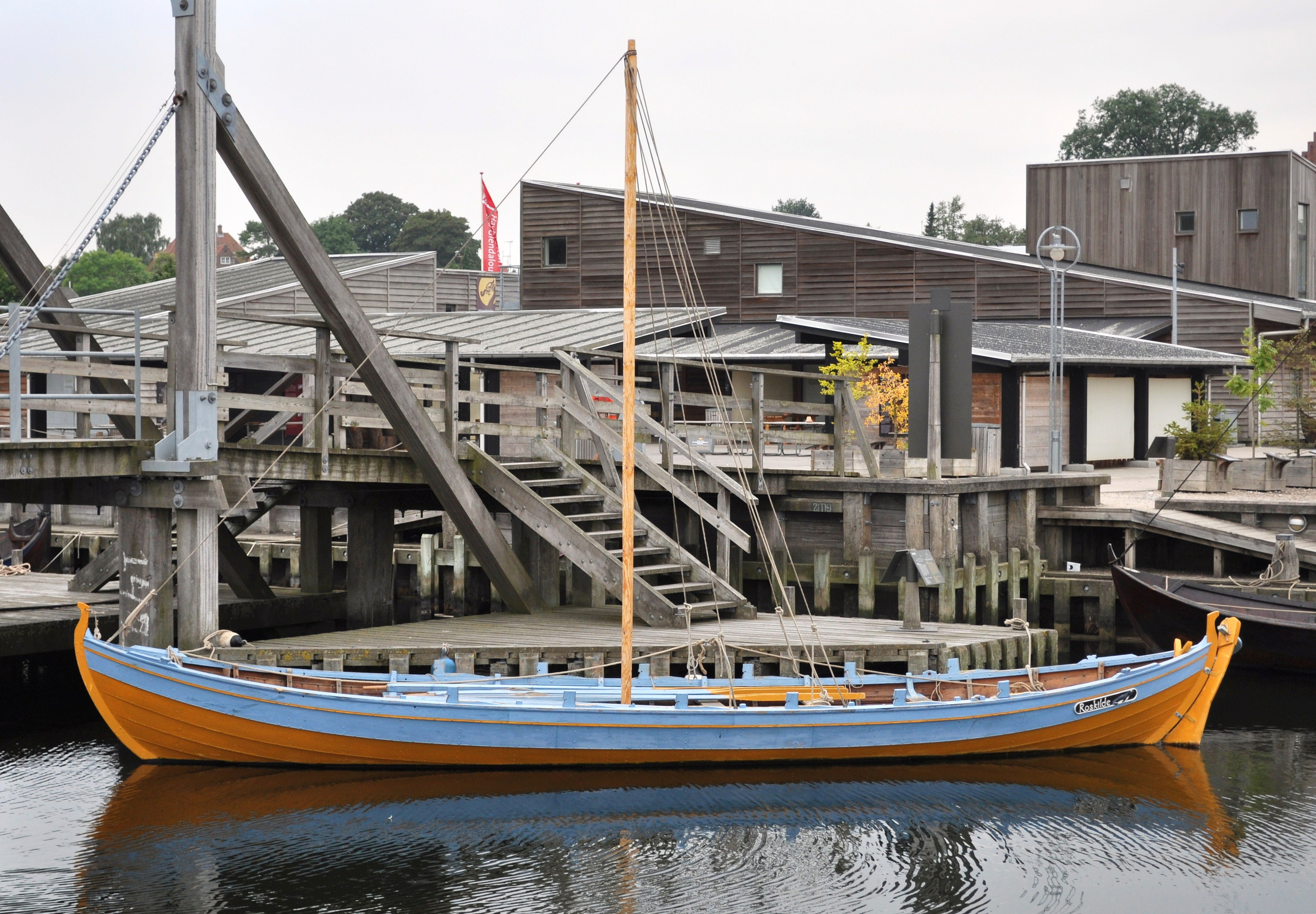
Fullscale navigable reconstructions of original ships are built at Museumsøen

== See also ==
- Äskekärr ship
- Ladby ship
- National Museum of Denmark
- Viking Ship Museum in Oslo
