= Viking Ship Museum (Oslo) =

Museum in Oslo, Norway

- Vikingskipshuset på Bygdøy
- Location: Bygdøy, Oslo, Norway
- Coordinates: 59°54′17.12″N 10°41′4.06″E
- Website: www.vikingtidsmuseet.no/english/

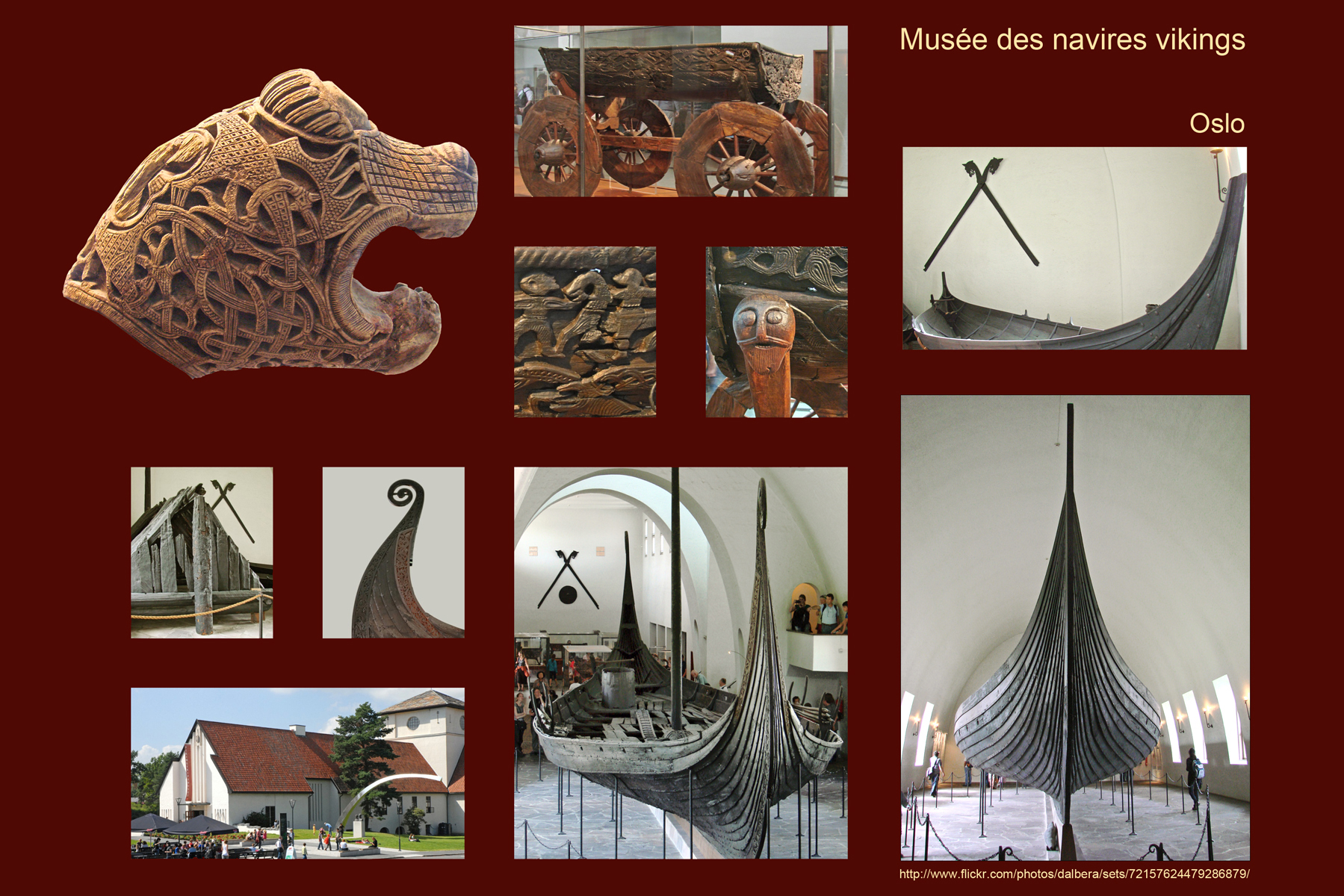
Viking Ship Museum at Bygdøy

The Viking Ship Museum (Norwegian: Vikingskipshuset på Bygdøy) is located on the Bygdøy peninsula in Oslo, Norway. It is temporarily closed from September 2021 until 2027.

It is part of the Museum of Cultural History of the University of Oslo, and houses three Viking era burial ships that were found as part of archaeological finds from Tune, Gokstad (Sandefjord), Oseberg (Tønsberg) and the Borre mound cemetery.

== Attractions ==
The museum is most famous for the completely whole Oseberg ship, excavated from the largest known ship burial in the world. Other main attractions at the Viking Ship Museum are the Gokstad ship and Tune ship. Additionally, the Viking Age display includes sledges, beds, a horse cart, wood carving, tent components, buckets and other grave goods.

== History ==
In 1913, Swedish professor Gabriel Gustafson proposed a specific building to house Viking Age finds that were discovered at the end of the 19th and the beginning of the 20th century. The Gokstad and Oseberg ships had been stored in temporary shelters at the University of Oslo. An architectural contest was held, and Arnstein Arneberg won.

The hall for the Oseberg ship was built with funding from the Parliament of Norway, and the ship was moved from the University shelters in 1926. The halls for the ships from Gokstad and Tune were completed in 1932. Building of the last hall was delayed, partly due to the Second World War, and this hall was completed in 1957. It houses most of the other finds, mostly from Oseberg.

=== Museum extension ===
On 20 December 2000 the University of Oslo had supported a proposal by the Historical Museum to move the ships and all the grave goods to a proposed new museum in Bjørvika, Oslo. There has been much debate about this suggestion, both in the museum and archaeological community as well as in the media. Opponents to the move have raised concerns that the ships are too fragile and that they will not survive the move undamaged, while proponents claim otherwise, suggesting a move could go ahead without inflicting serious damage to the finds.

In 2015 Statsbygg announced a competition for the expansion of existing facilities at Bygdøy. The winner of the architectural competition was announced on 12 April 2016: the Danish firm AART architects with their proposal titled "NAUST".

== Gallery ==
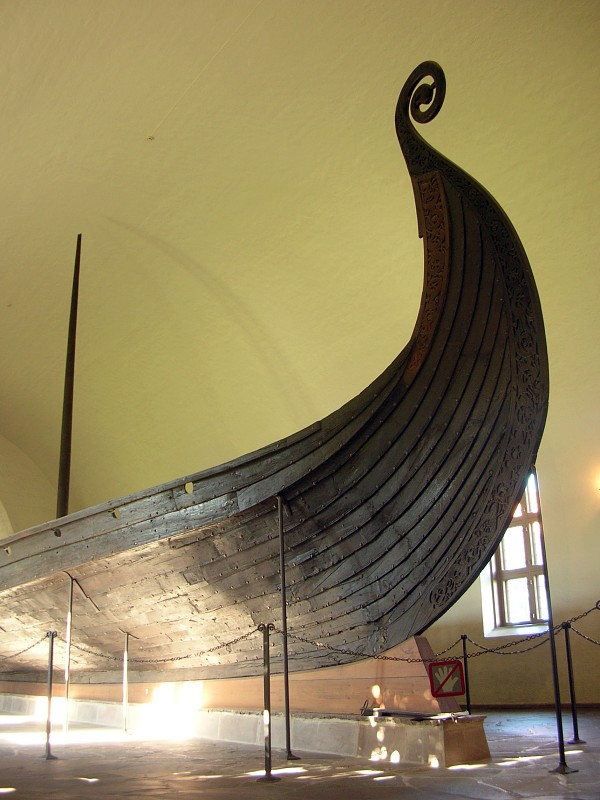
Oseberg Ship prow

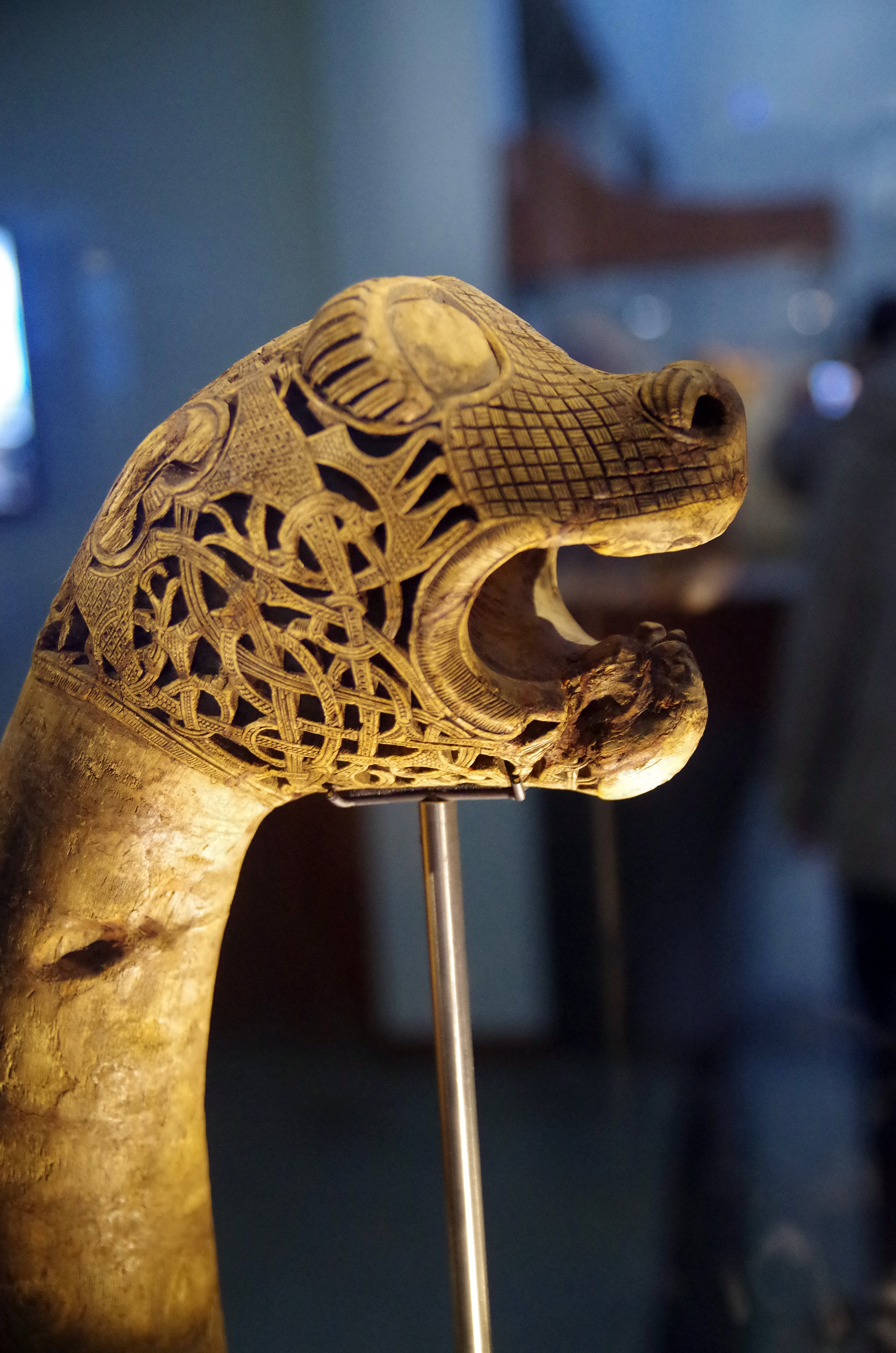
Animal Head Post from Viking Ship Museum

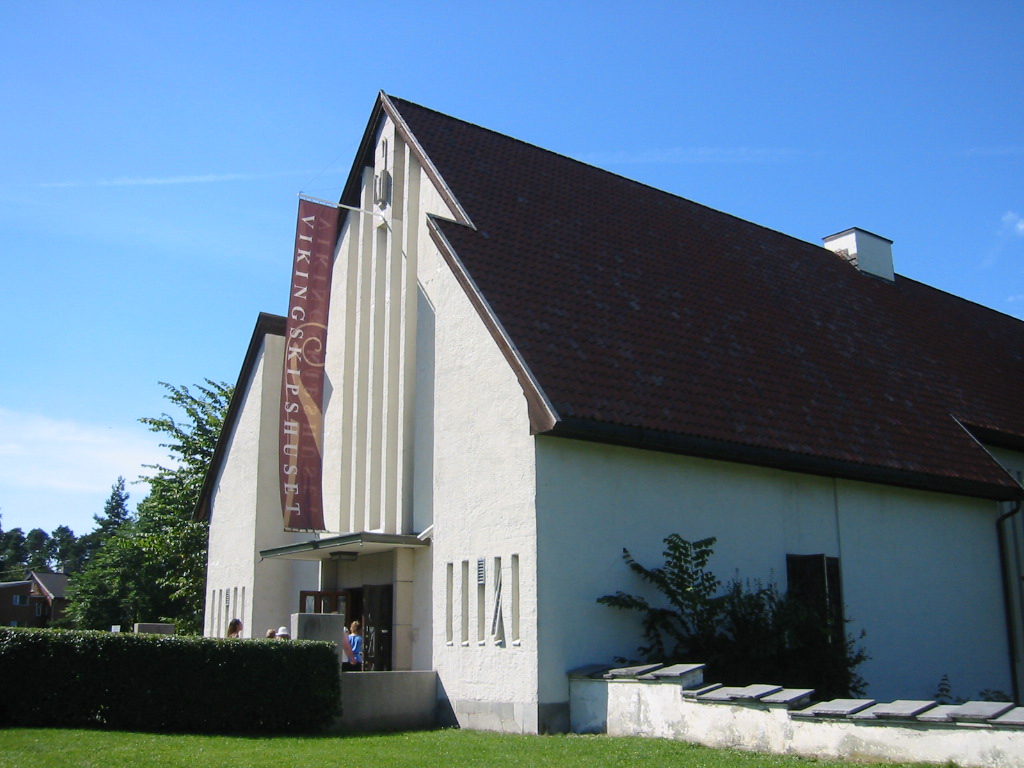
Viking Ship Museum at Bygdøy

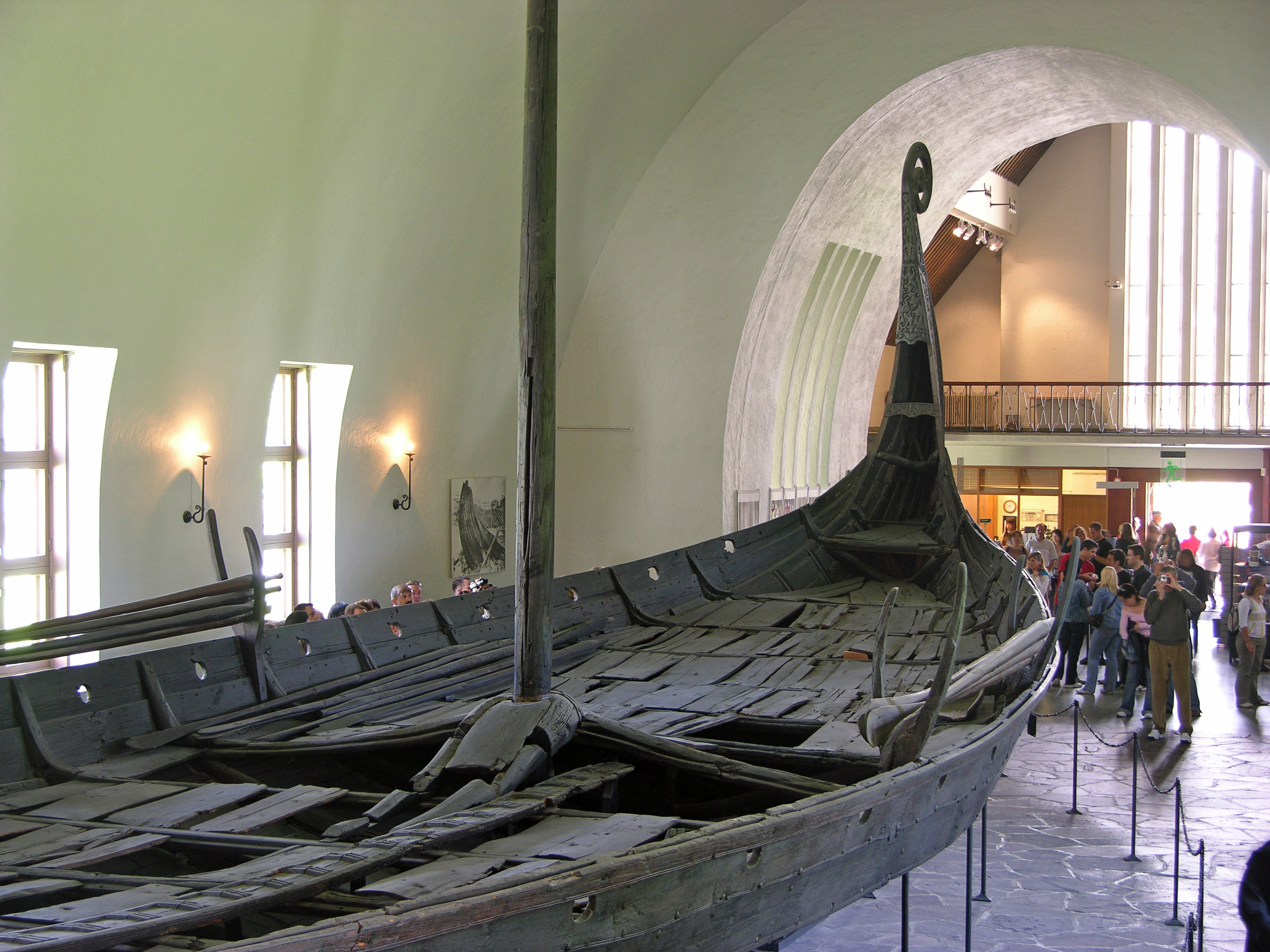
Oseberg Ship in Viking Ship Museum

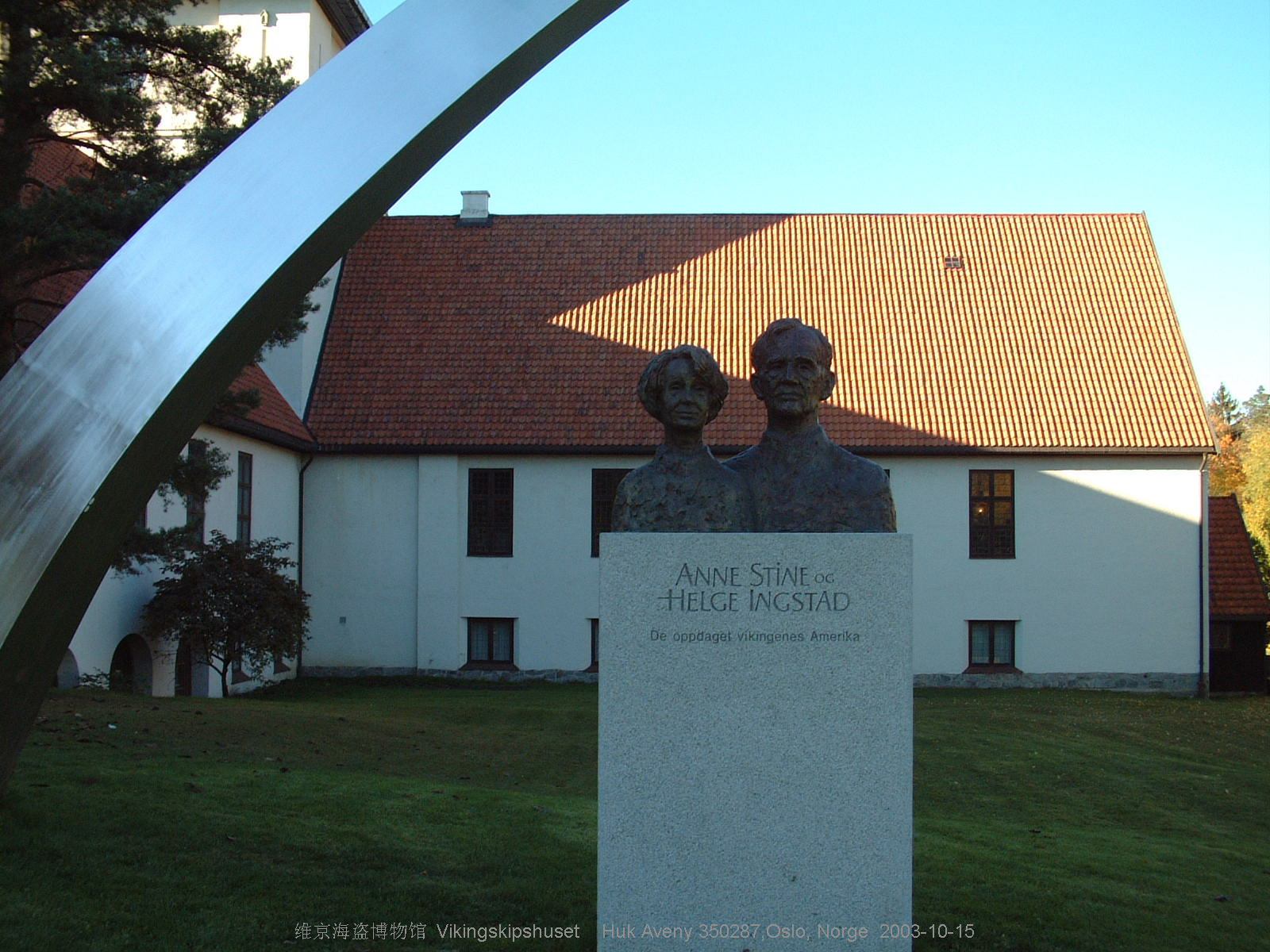
Bust of Anne Stine and Helge Ingstad outside Viking Ship Museum

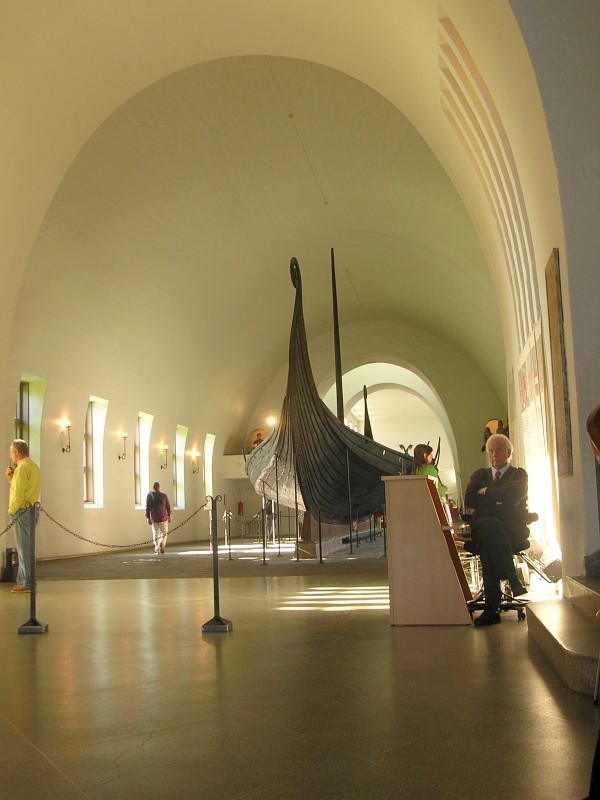

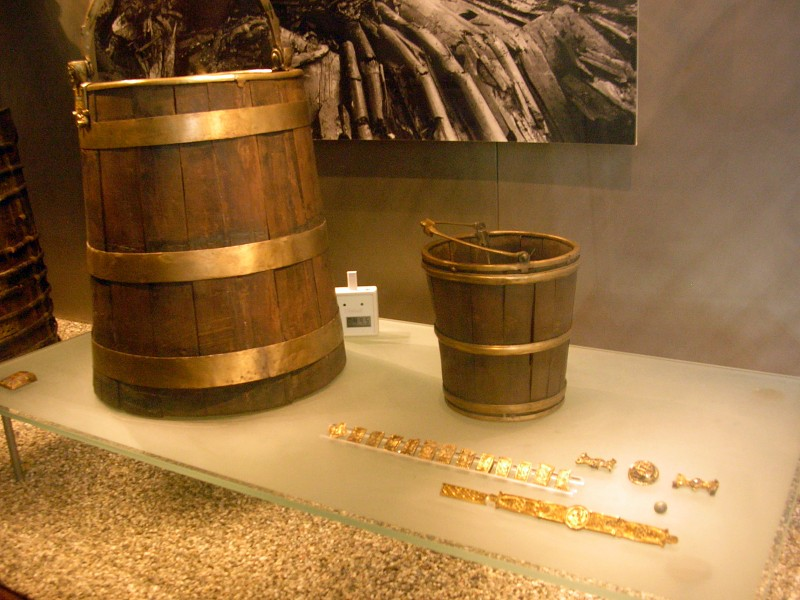

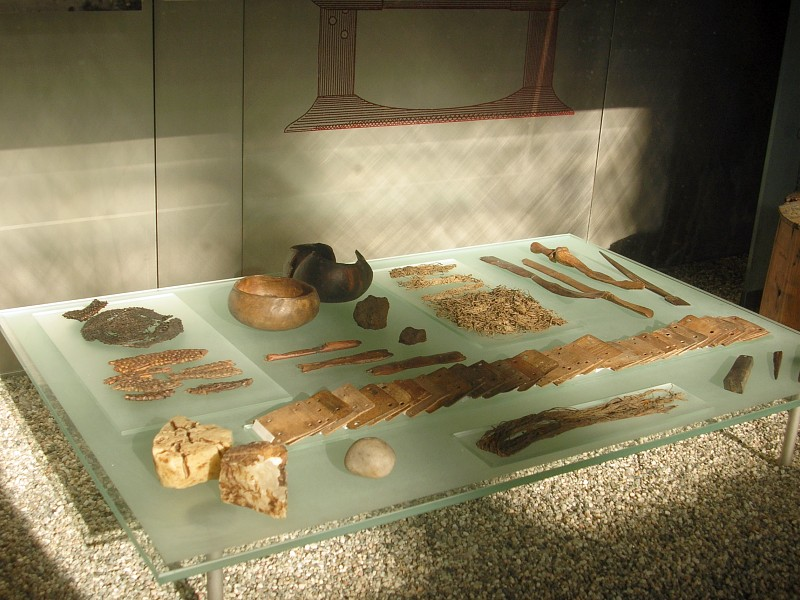

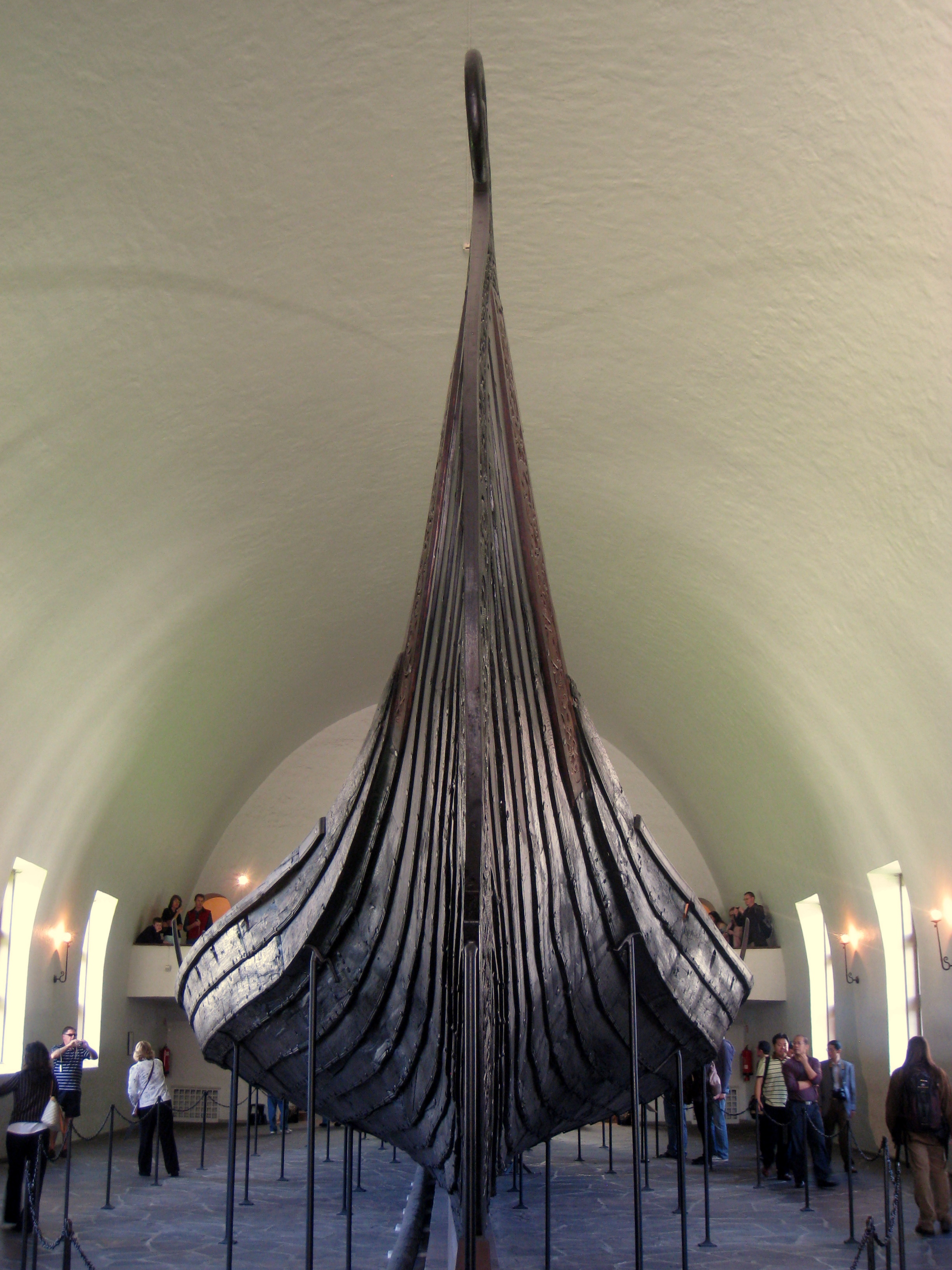

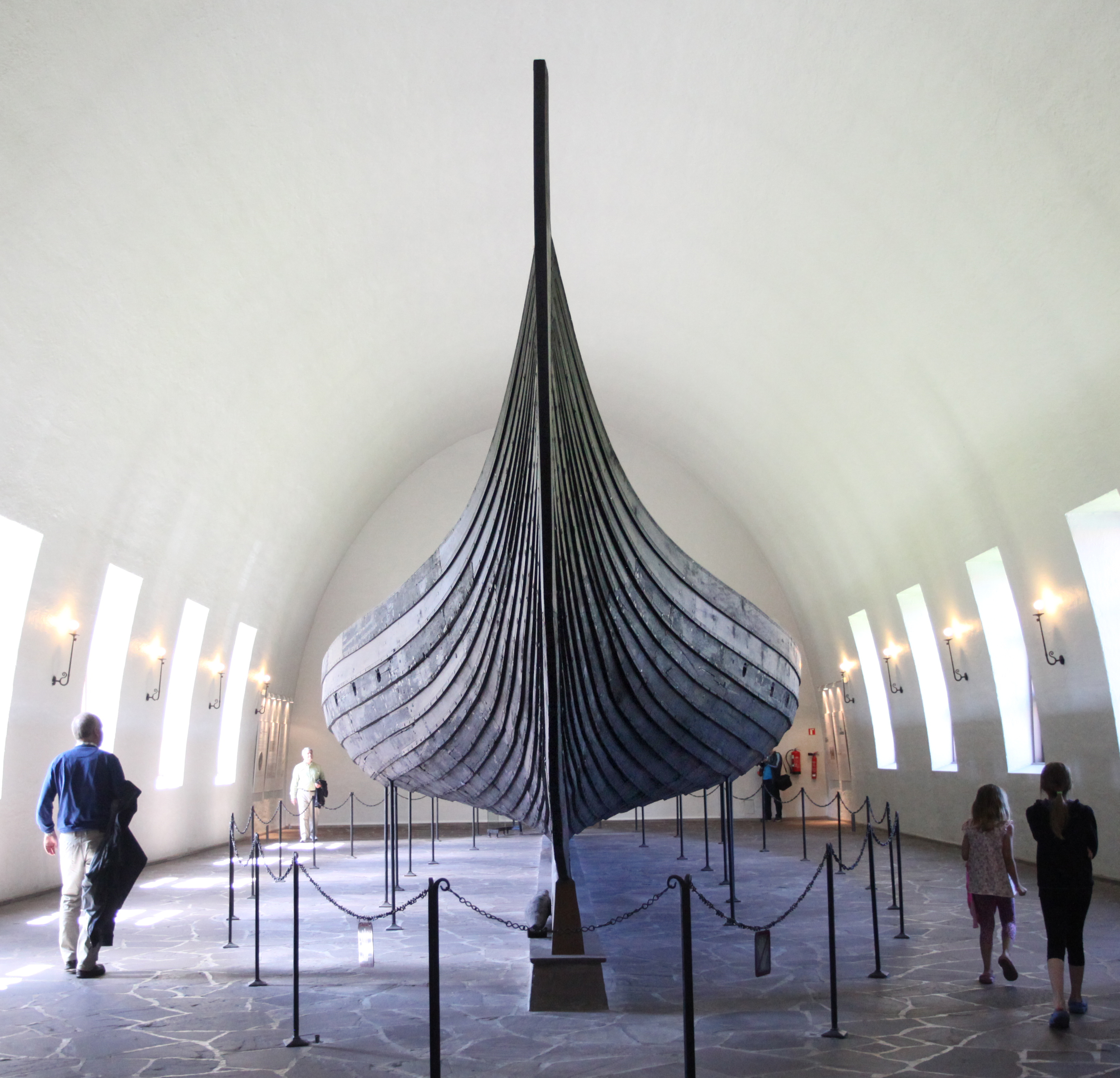

== See also ==
- Viking Ship Museum in Roskilde
- Äskekärr ship

== Other sources ==
- Brøgger, A. W. and Schetelig, H. Osebergfundet (Oslo. 1917)
- Brøgger A.W. and Shetelig, H. Vikingskipene deres forgjenger og etterfølgere (Oslo. 1950)
- Christensen, Arne Emil Kongsgårdens håndtverkere, Osebergdronningens grav, vår arkeologiske nasjonalskatt i nytt lys (Oslo. 1992)
- Ingstad, Anne Stine Hva har tekstilene vært brukt til? Osebergdronningens grav (Oslo. 1992)
