= Ladby ship =

Danish ship burial

Coordinates: 55°26′36.07″N 10°37′0.88″E

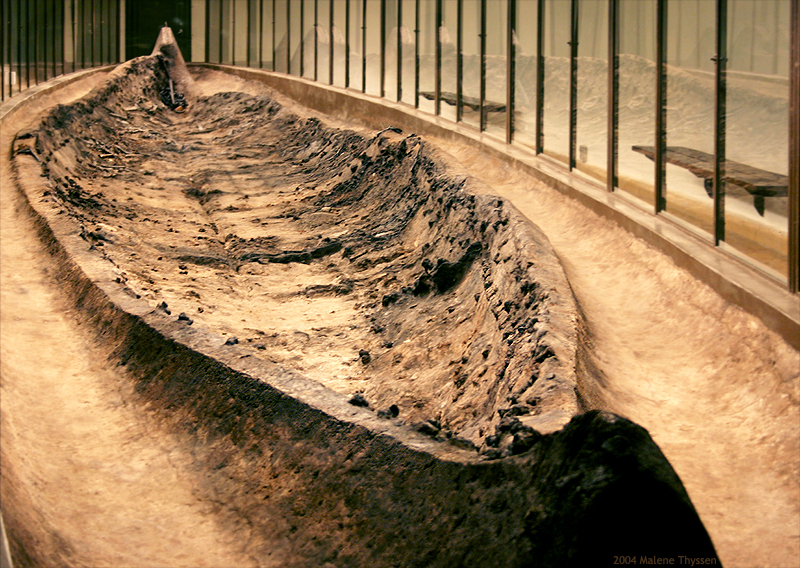
The Ladby ship

The Ladby ship is a major ship burial at the village of Ladby near Kerteminde in Denmark. It is of the type also represented by the boat chamber grave of Hedeby and the ship burials of Oseberg, Borre, Gokstad and Tune in South Norway, all of which date back to the 9th and 10th centuries. It is the only ship burial from the Viking Age discovered in Denmark (Hedeby was a Danish Viking settlement, but today is located in Germany). It has been preserved at the site where it was discovered, which today is part of a museum.

== Discovery ==
The grave is situated within an otherwise unremarkable burial site from the Viking Age. Excavations revealed an abundance of grave goods consisting of both objects and animals. It has been dated to the early 10th century, based on a gilded link of bronze for a dog-harness, decorated in the Jelling style, found there..

The grave had been extensively damaged. Since only a few small human bones were found, researchers have concluded that the site is a translation, a conversion from a heathen to a Christian grave. Another interpretation is that the struggle for dominance by King Haraldr Blátönn and his heir, Sveinn Tjúguskegg, may have led to the grave's desecration. The ship was a symbol of power—easily visible to all who travelled or lived in the area—glorifying the minor king buried with it. By removing the deceased and chopping all his grave goods into hundreds of pieces within a few years of the burial, the attackers presumably gave his heirs a great blow to their family prestige.

The site was discovered on or around February 28, 1935, near Kerteminde in northeastern Fyn, Denmark, by pharmacist and amateur archaeologist Poul Helweg Mikkelsen. Original drawings by Mikkelsen and Danish National Museum conservator Gustav Rosenberg constitute the primary source-material for information on the find. Mikkelsen paid for an arched building to be raised above the site, which was then covered with earth and grass. The ship was then given to the National Museum, which had full responsibility for the site until 1994, when responsibility passed to the Department of Archaeology and Landscape at the Viking Museum at Ladby (part of The Museums of Eastern Funen).

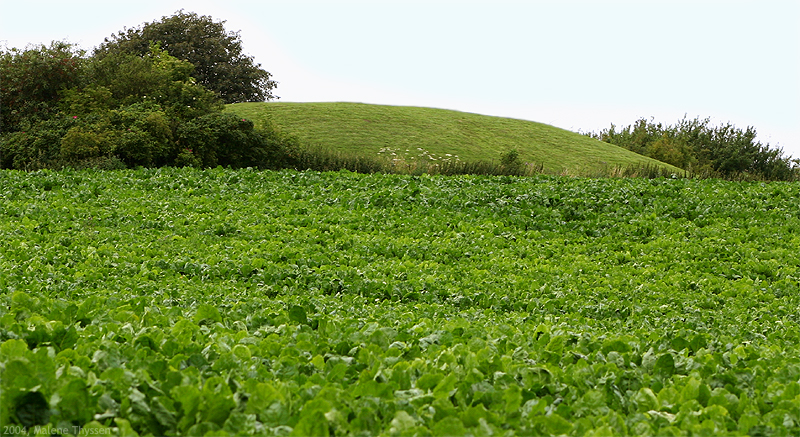
The Ladby burial mound

== Excavation ==
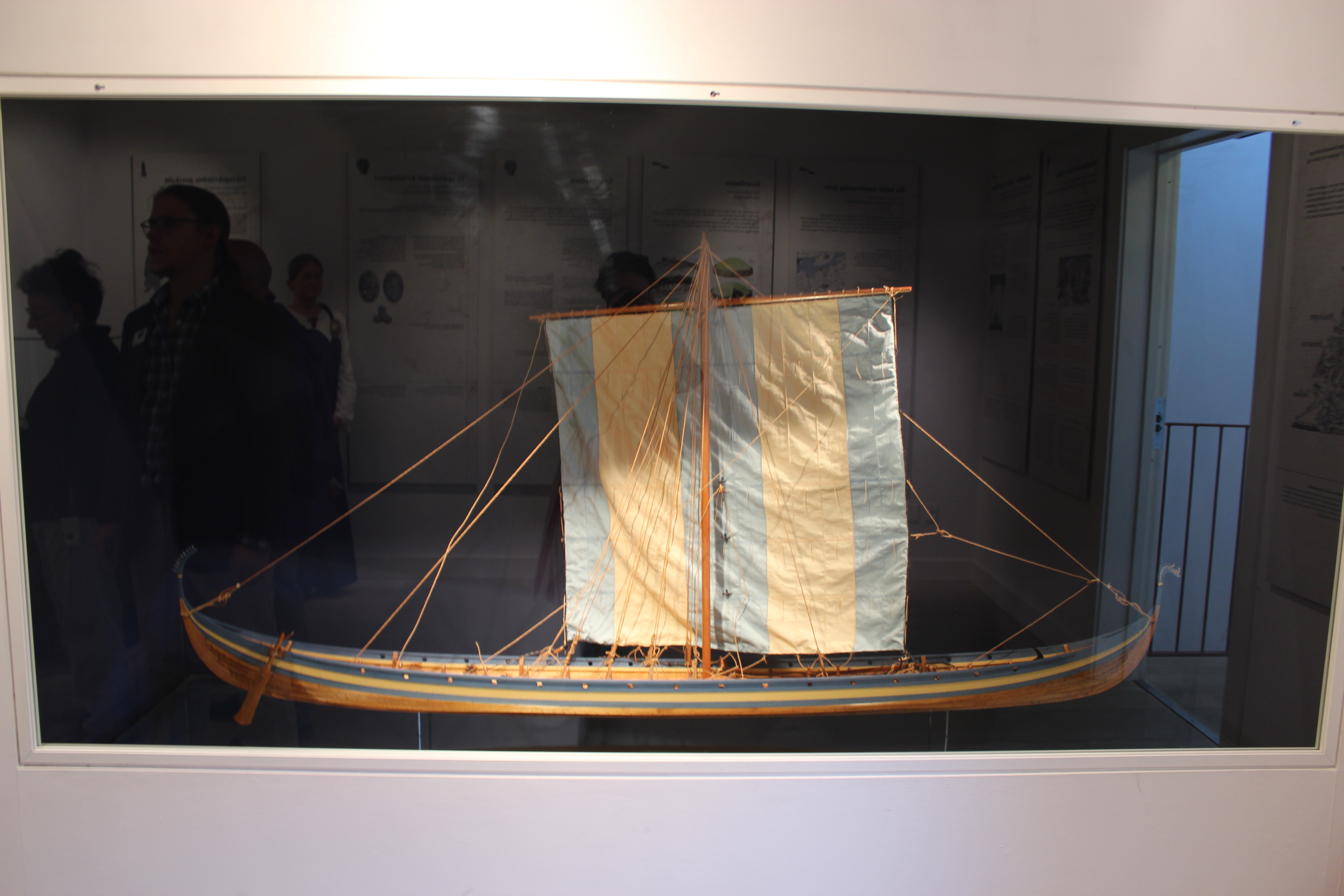
A model reconstruction of the ship, many details guessed

The Ship

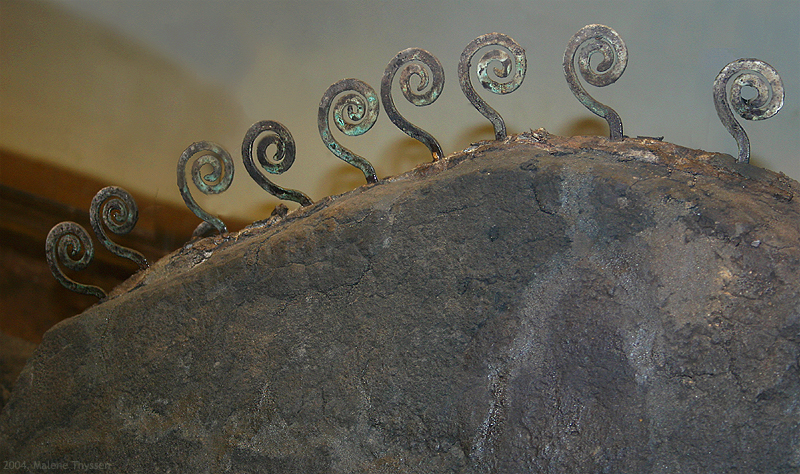
Ornaments from the stem

Grave Goods

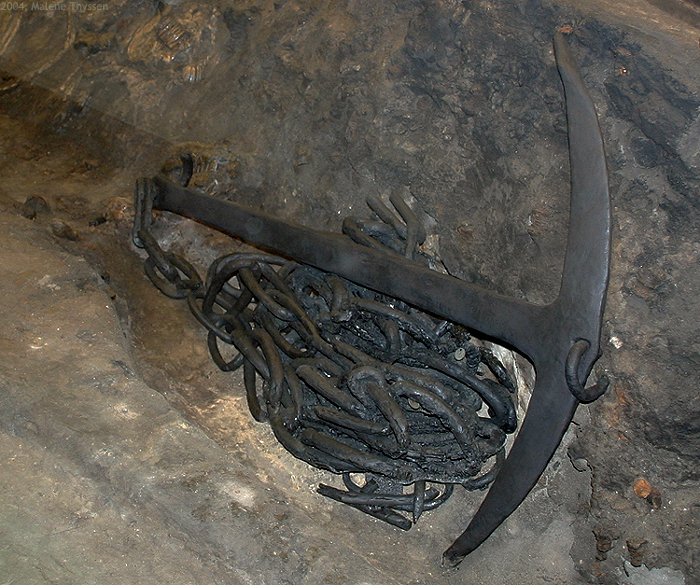
Anchor

== Viking Museum Ladby ==
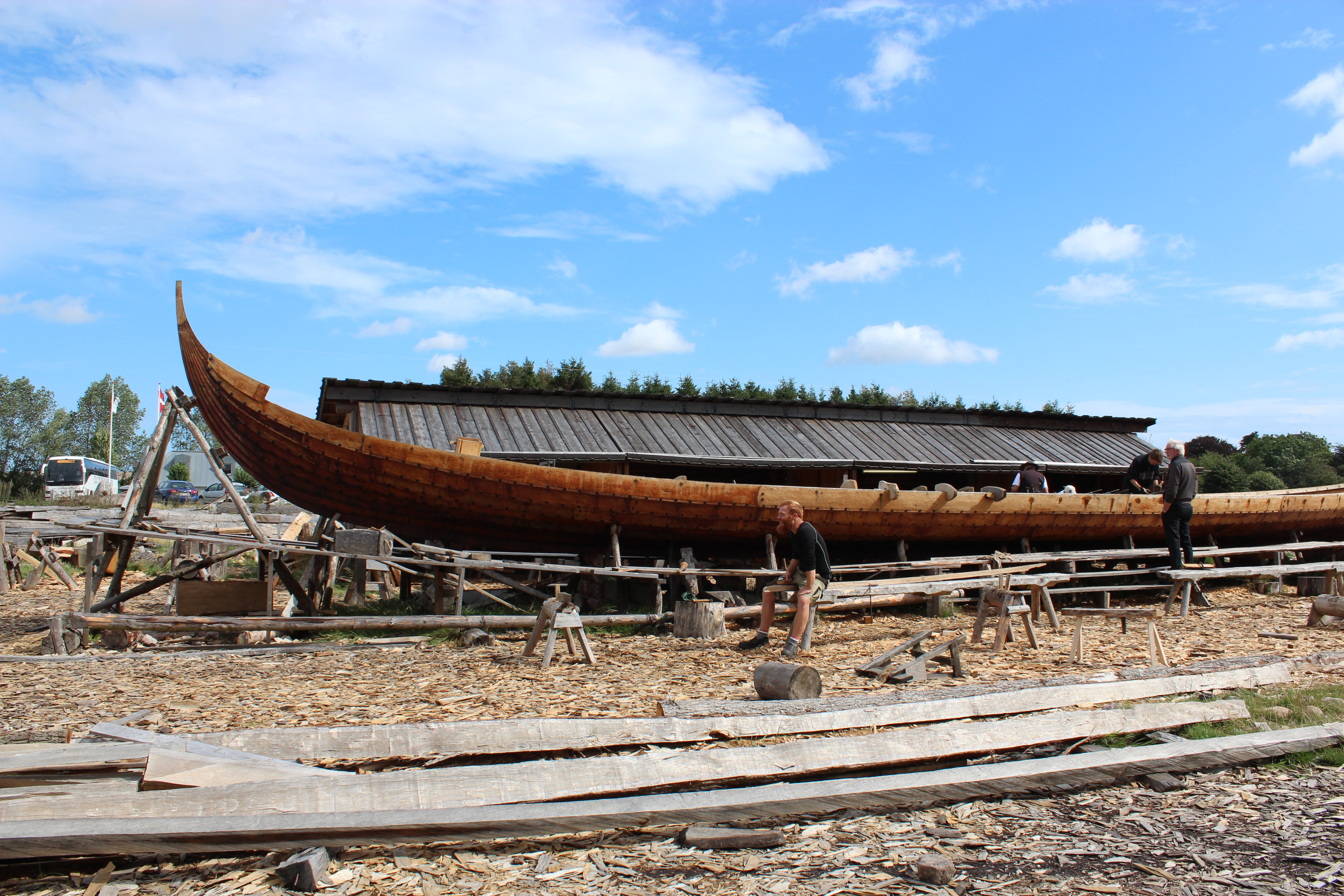
A reconstruction being built at the museum

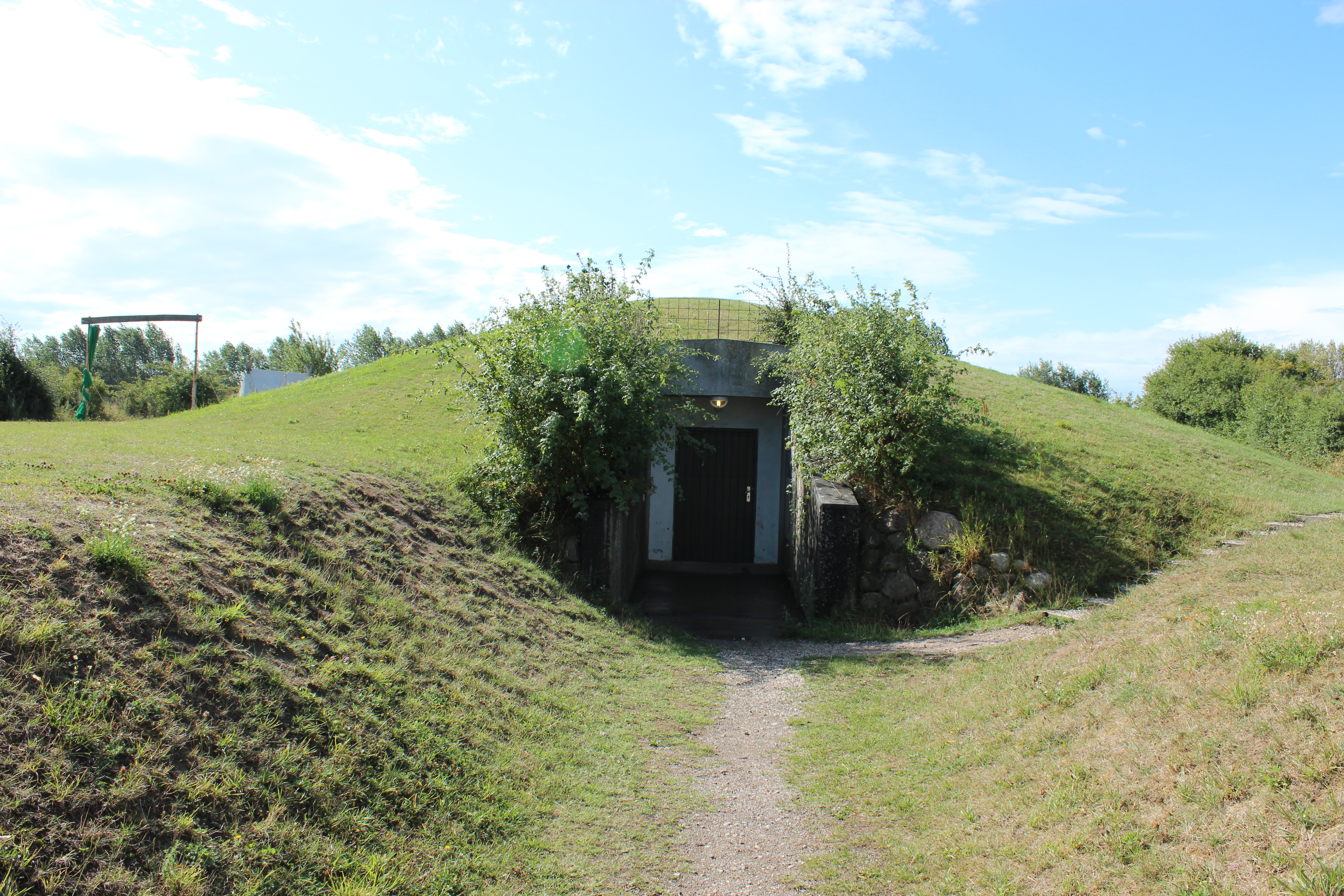
Museum entrance

Now the Viking Museum at Ladby displays many of the original finds and offers an engaging overview of the Viking era as it unfolded on the north east of the island of Funen. The new building from 2007 also contains a reconstruction of the ship burial. It shows the scene as it may have looked right after the funeral, with the deceased chieftain lying on a bed in a full-scale replica of his ship, with all his grave goods, near his dogs and his eleven horses. There is also an interpretive movie about the Vikings' beliefs regarding the journey to the realm of the dead, based on Norse myths and the images on the Gotlandic Picture stones.

== Literature ==
- Sørensen, Anne C.: Ladby. A Danish Ship-Grave from the Viking Age, Ships and Boats of The North, Vol. 3; Viking Ship Museum in collaboration with the National Museum of Denmark and Kertemindeegnens Museer, Roskilde 2001, ISBN 978-87-85180-44-5

== Sources ==
- Summary of: Ladby. A Danish Ship-Grave from the Viking Age Viking Ship Museum Roskilde.
- The Ladby Ship 1001 stories of Denmark, The Heritage Agency of Denmark. Audio-file available.
