= Tune ship =

Preserved Viking ship

Coordinates: 59.2792°N 11.0028°E

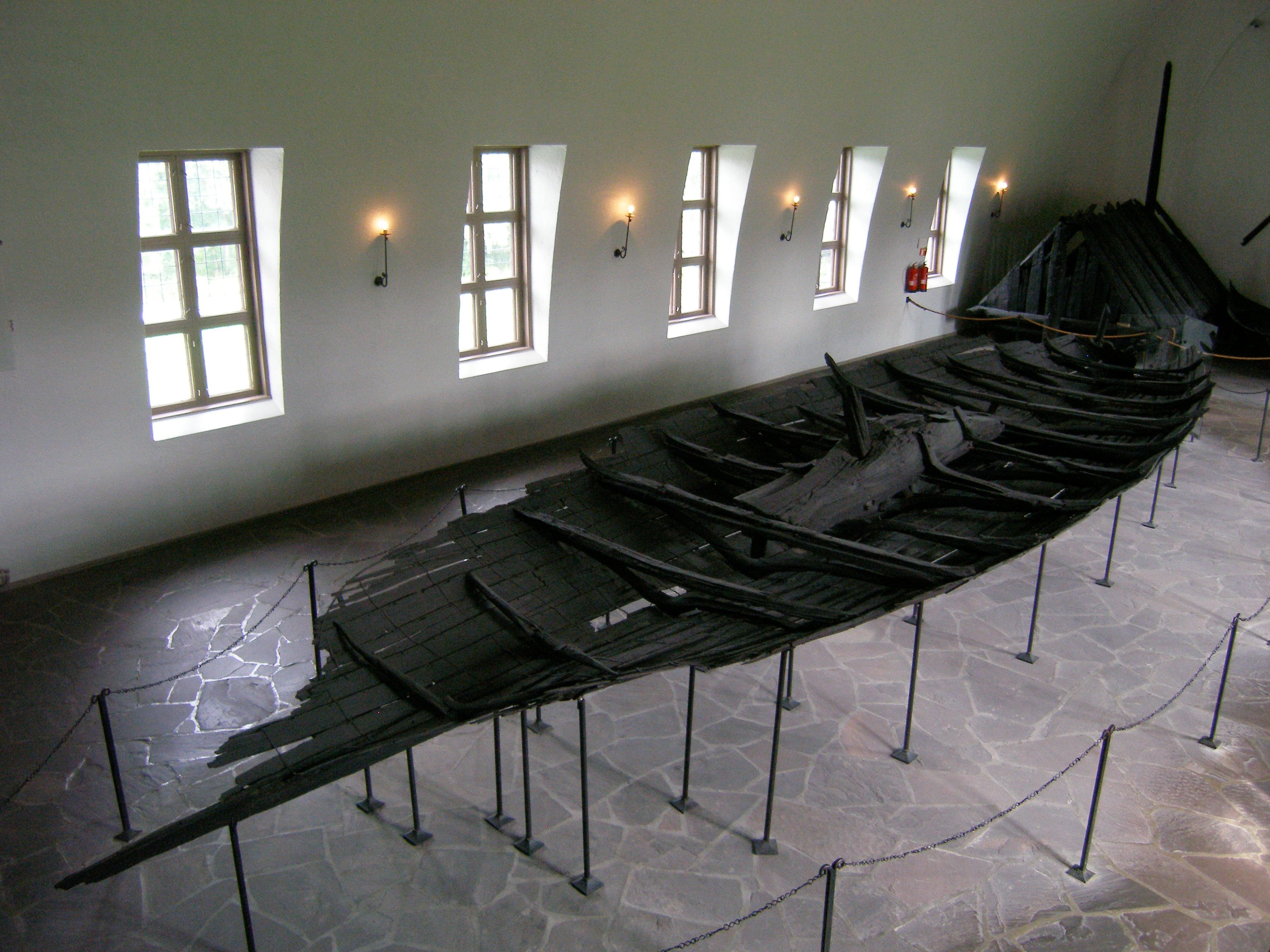
- Tune ship at the Viking Ship Museum

History
- Namesake: Tune, Norway
- Launched: c. 900
- Status: Museum ship

General characteristics
- Type: Karve
- Length: 22 m (72 ft) (estimate)
- Beam: 4.35 m (14.3 ft)

The Tune ship (Tuneskipet) is a Viking ship exhibited in the Viking Ship Museum (Vikingskipshuset på Bygdøy) in Bygdøy, Oslo.

The Tune ship is of the karve, a small type of longship with broad hull. It was found at the Haugen farm on the island of Rolvsøy in the parish of Tune in Østfold, Norway. It was discovered in a ship burial mound (Båthaugen, from the Old Norse words båt meaning boat and haugr meaning mound or barrow). It was discovered when the burial mound was opened and the site was excavated by archaeologist Oluf Rygh in 1867. It was named the Tune ship by Professor Rygh after excavation. This is due to the discovery being located in Tune parish.

The grave, found attached to the gunwale of the ship, contained a wooden spade, a hand spike, and carved pieces of wood. The ship had clearly been ransacked previous to Rygh's arrival, and likely contained many more items, including the corpse of a man.

The Tune ship is fragmentary, but may have been up to 18.7 metres (61 ft) long. It is 4.2 metres (14 ft) wide and would have had 11 or 12 pairs of oars. The length of the keel is approximately 14 metres (46 ft). The ship was built around AD 900. It was made principally of clinkered oak planks. It is of rugged construction with naturally grown ribs, thick crossbeams and a solid gunwale.

== Other sources ==
- Marstrander, Sverre (1999) Tuneskipet (Sarpsborg: Borgarsyssel Museum) ISBN 8299266424
