= Äskekärr ship =

9th century Viking ship found in Sweden

Äskekärr ship
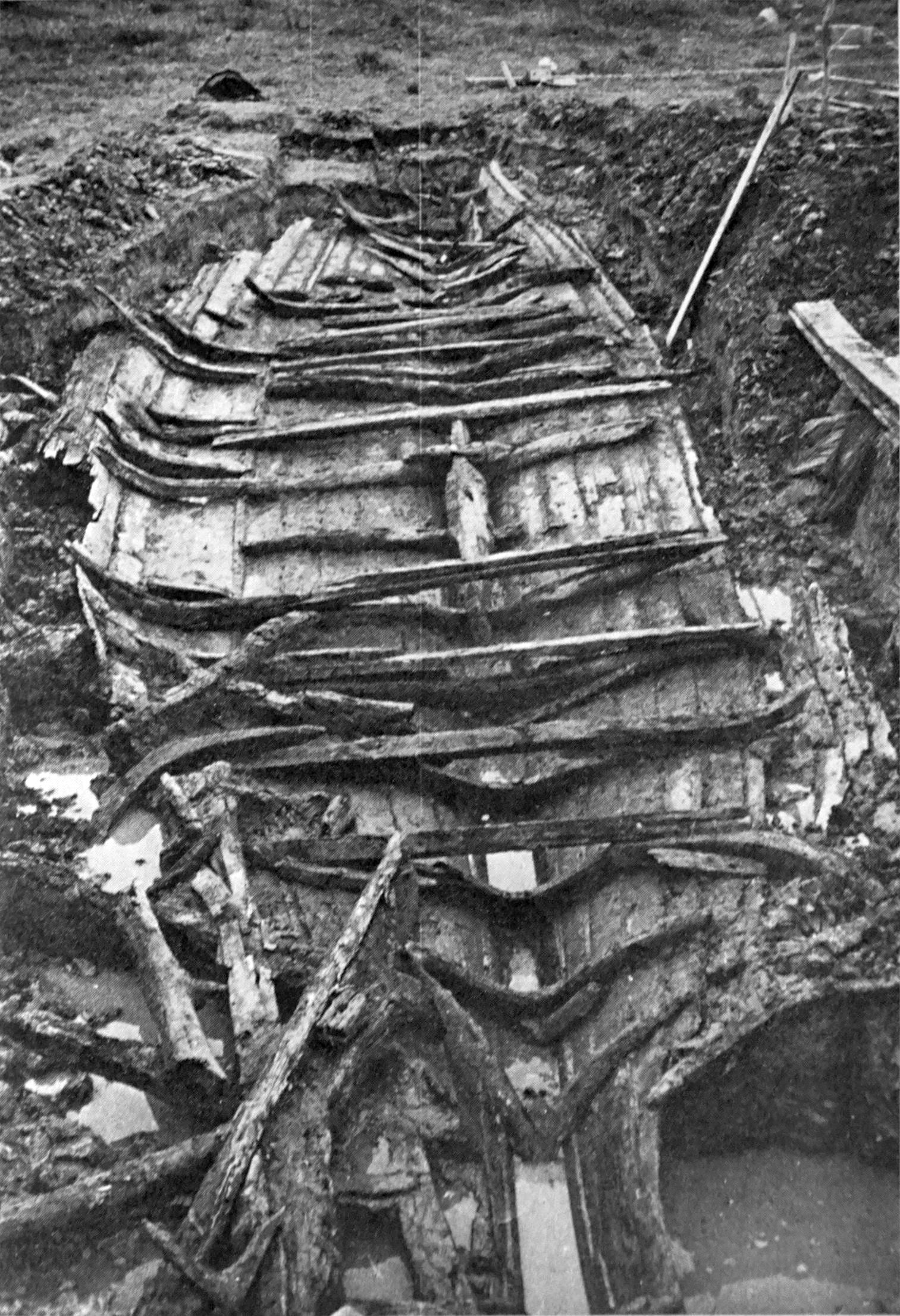
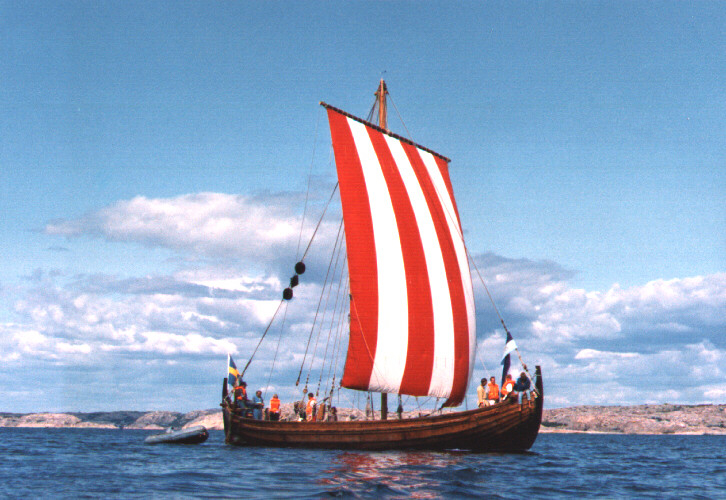
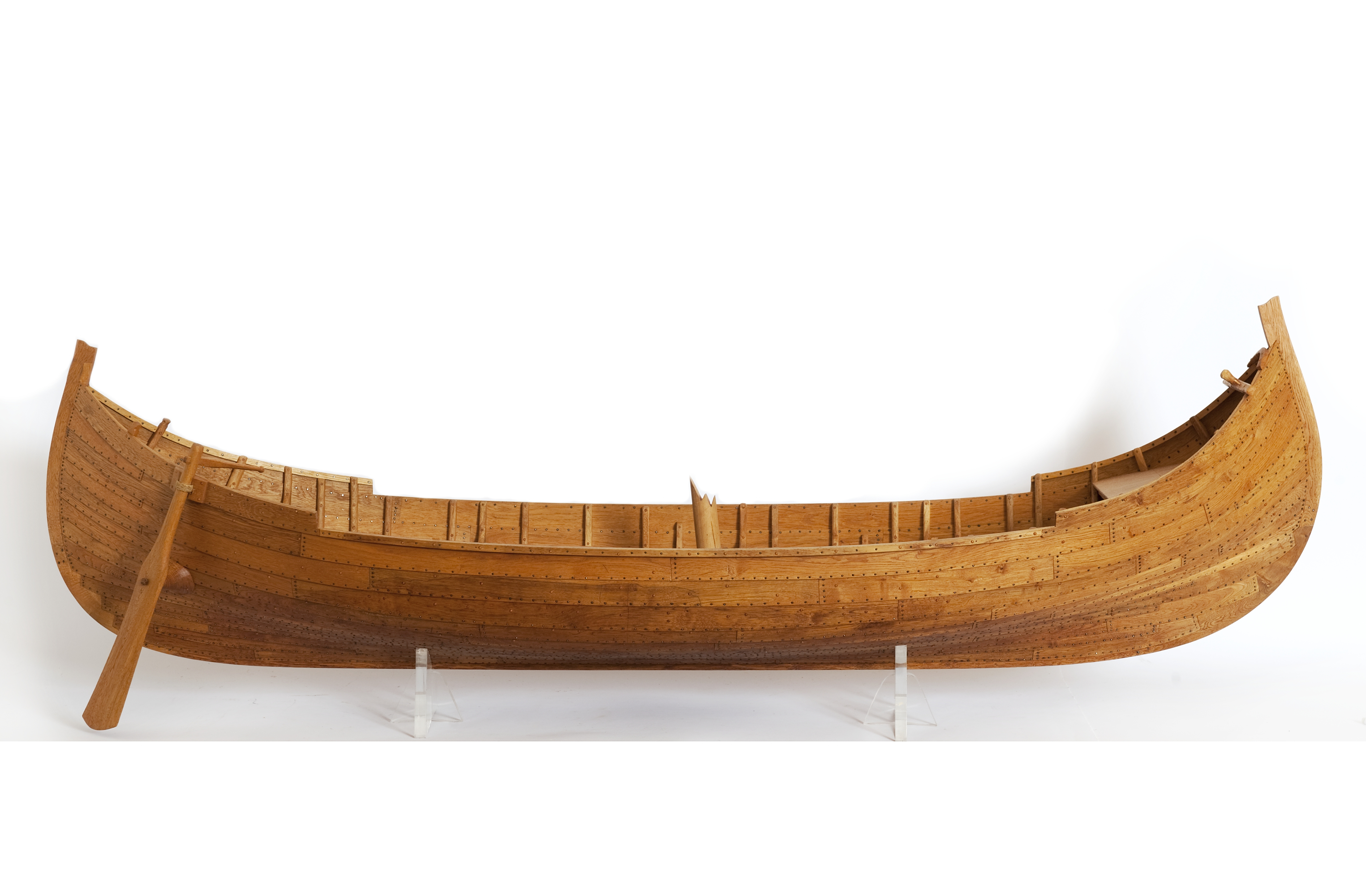
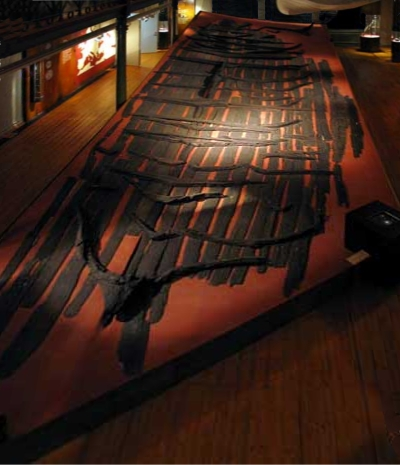
- Top left: The excavation of the Äskekärr ship in 1933
- Top right: Replica of the Äskekärr ship, Vidfamne
- Lower left: Model of the Äskekärr ship (mast cut)
- Lower right: The Äskekärr ship today

The Äskeskärr ship (Swedish: Äskekärrskeppet) is a Viking knarr from the 9th century, which is one of the oldest sailing vessels discovered in Scandinavia.

The Äskeskärr ship was discovered in 1933 by a farmer who was draining a wet meadow on his lands in the village Äskekärr, present-day Ale Municipality, on the River Göta in Sweden.

It is currently housed in the Gothenburg Museum in Gothenburg, Sweden.
