= Nicolaysen =

Nicolaysen is a surname. Notable people with the name include:

- Nicolay Nicolaysen (1817–1911), Norwegian archaeologist
- Julius Nicolaysen (1831–1909), Norwegian professor of medicine
- Nicolay Nicolaysen Sontum (1852–1915), Norwegian engineer, businessperson and contractor
- Wilhelm Nicolaysen (1869–1944), Norwegian barrister and businessperson

== See also ==
- Nicolaisen, surname
