= Viking (replica Viking longship) =

Viking ship replica

Coordinates: 41°53′37″N 88°17′32″W

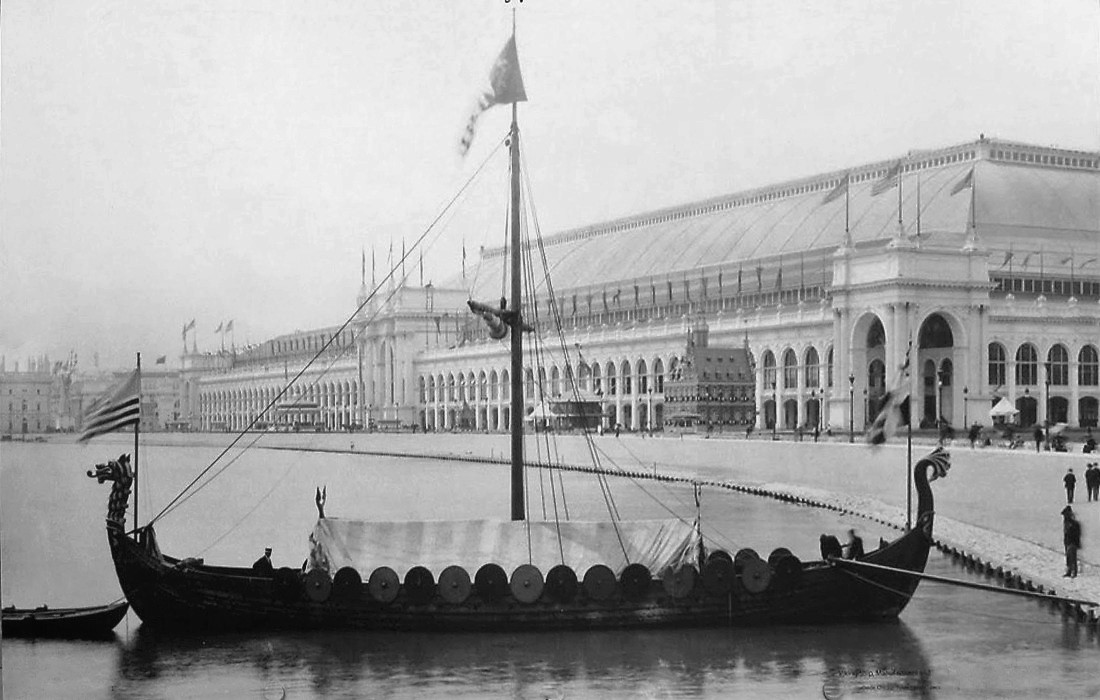
- Viking at the 1893 Chicago World Fair

History

United States
- Name: Viking
- Owner: Friends of the Viking Ship
- Operator: Captain Magnus Andersen
- Builder: Christen Christensen
- Launched: Rødsverven shipyard at Sandefjord, Norway
- Completed: 1893
- Maiden voyage: Bergen, Norway to Chicago, Illinois
- Fate: On exhibition at Good Templar Park in Geneva, Illinois
- Status: Viking ship replica

General characteristics
- Length: 78 ft (24 m)
- Beam: 17 ft (5.2 m)
- Height: 6.5 ft (2.0 m)
- Speed: 10 kn (19 km/h; 12 mph)

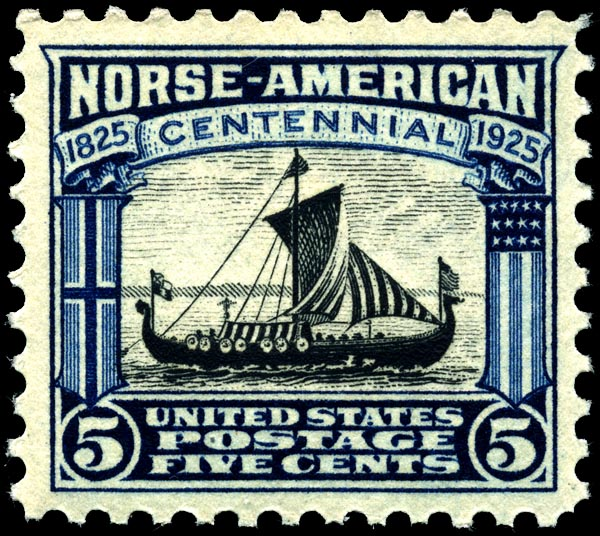
A 1925 US 5c Postage Stamp featuring the Viking, for the Norse-American Centennial

Viking is a Viking ship replica. It is an exact replica of the Gokstad ship recovered from Gokstadhaugen, a Viking Age burial mound in Sandefjord, Norway in 1880. Viking was featured at the World's Columbian Exposition at Chicago in 1893.

== History ==
The ship was built at the Rødsverven shipyard in Sandefjord, Norway. The construction was undertaken by Norwegian shipyard and ship-owner Christen Christensen together with Ole Wegger (1859–1936) director of Framnæs Mekaniske Værksted. The ship was christened Viking. The ship was sailed by Captain Magnus Andersen (1857–1938) and a crew of 11 from Bergen, Norway.

Viking sailed to North America, via Newfoundland and New York, up the Hudson River, through the Erie Canal and into the Great Lakes to Chicago, where the World's Columbian Exposition was taking place in 1893 to commemorate the discovery of America by Columbus. Carter Harrison III, Chicago's four-term mayor, boarded and took command for the last leg of the voyage, arriving at Jackson Park on Wednesday, July 12, 1893, to much fanfare.

After the 1893 Exposition, Viking sailed down the Mississippi to New Orleans and wintered there. On her return to Chicago, Viking was first located beside the Field Columbian Museum (now the Museum of Science and Industry) in Chicago, then placed in Lincoln Park under a fenced-in, wooden shelter, where it was neglected and covered in pigeon guano for decades. In 1920, the ship was restored by the Federation of Norwegian Women's Societies.

In 1925, to publicize and promote the Norse-American Centennial in St. Paul, Minnesota, a set of United States Postage Stamps were issued. The event honored the 100th anniversary of Norwegian immigration to the United States. One of the stamps featured a picture of Viking based upon a photograph taken in 1893. The engravers included the American flag waving from the bow.

== Current display ==
In 1994, Viking was moved from its location to make room for expansion of the Lincoln Park Zoo. With funds raised from the Scandinavian-American community, the ship was moved into a warehouse in West Chicago, and then to Good Templar Park in Geneva, Illinois, and secured under a canopy. The head and tail of Viking were placed in storage at the Chicago Museum of Science and Industry. In 2007, Landmarks Illinois listed the ship as one of the 10 most endangered landmarks in Illinois. In 2008, Preservation Partners of the Fox Valley was recognized by Landmarks Illinois and the Richard H. Driehaus Foundation for fund raising efforts resulting in stabilization of the ship. That same year, funds for preservation were awarded by American Express in partnership with the National Trust for Historic Preservation.

In 2012, trusteeship of Viking was transferred from the Chicago Park District to Friends of the Viking Ship, which had been established to further the preservation effort. Docent-led tours are offered on scheduled dates during the months of April through October. In 2013 and 2014, stabilization efforts and exhibit improvements were made. Additional keel supports were installed in 2014. A further step in the stabilization effort will be to clean, treat, and seal all of Viking's thousands of rivets.

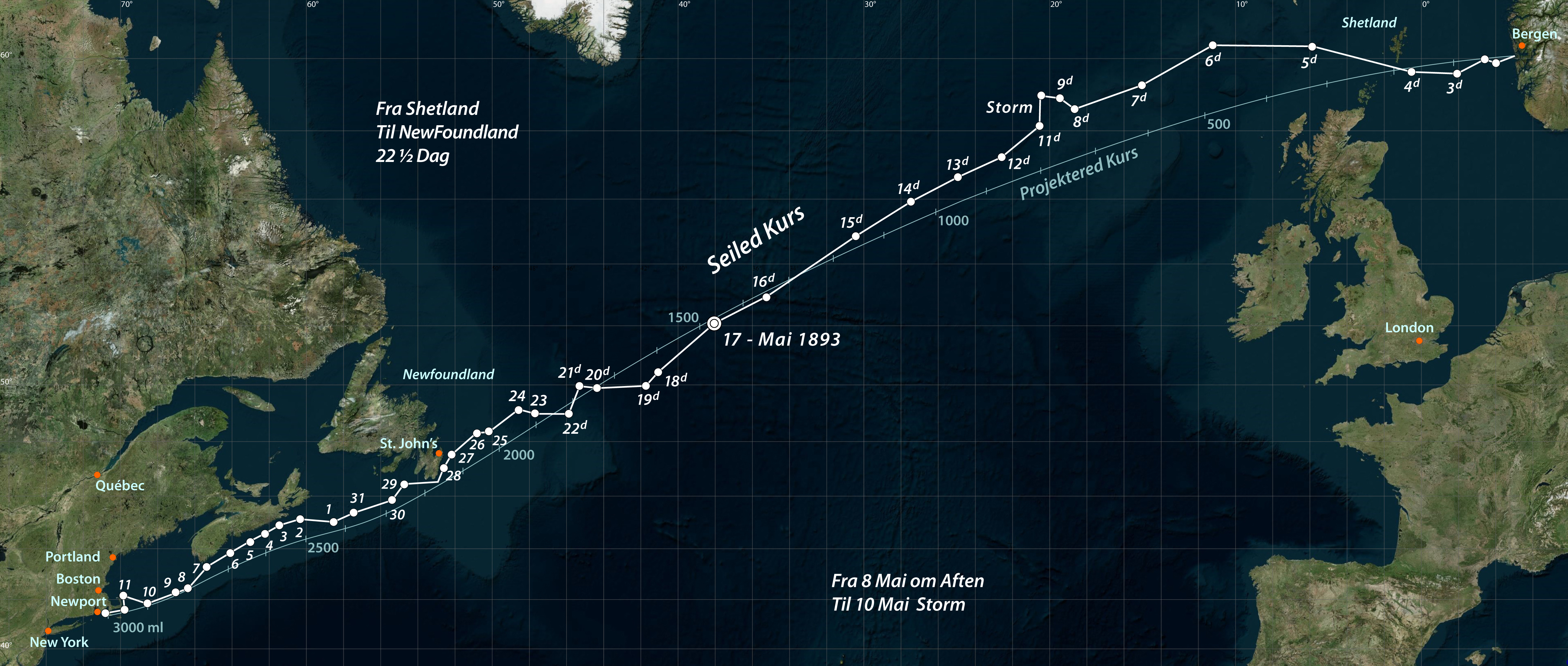
Viking's way across the Atlantic in 1893

== Images ==
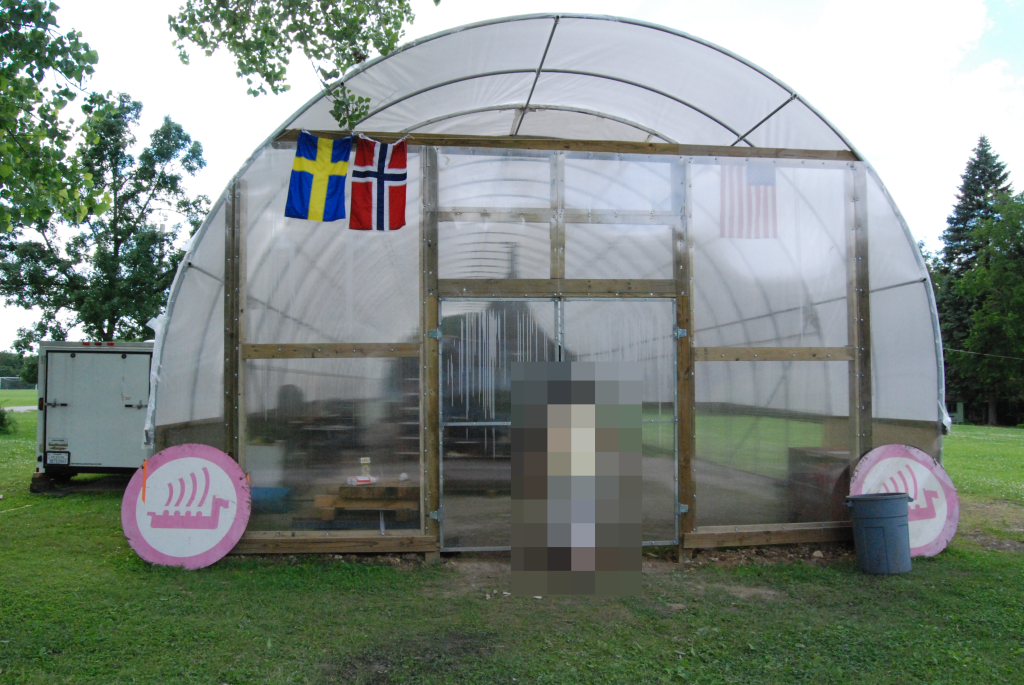
Viking's shelter

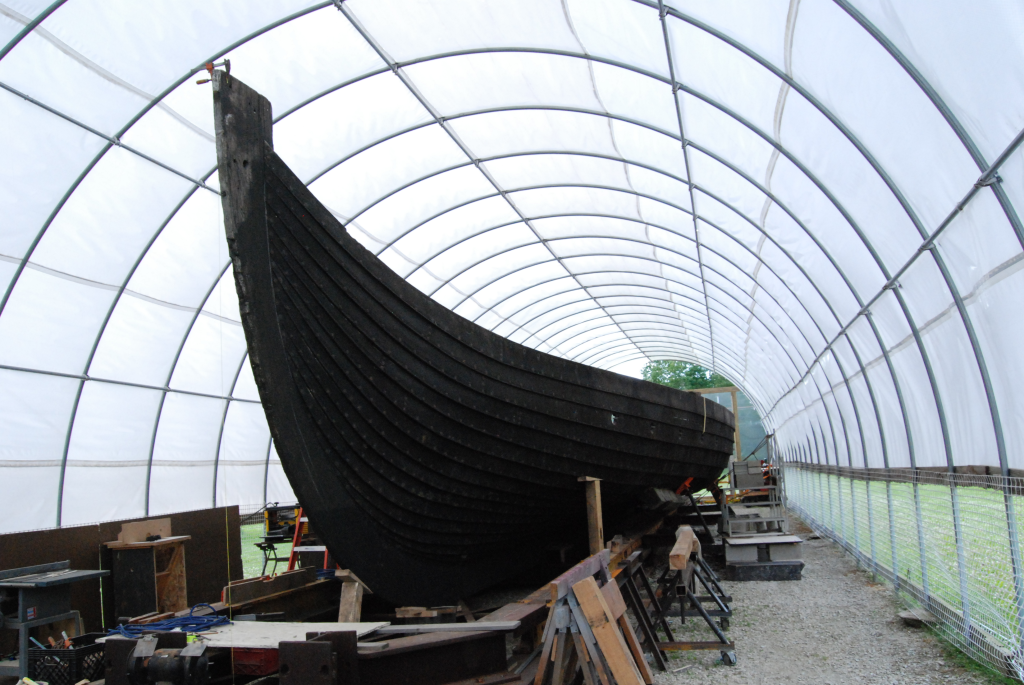
Side view

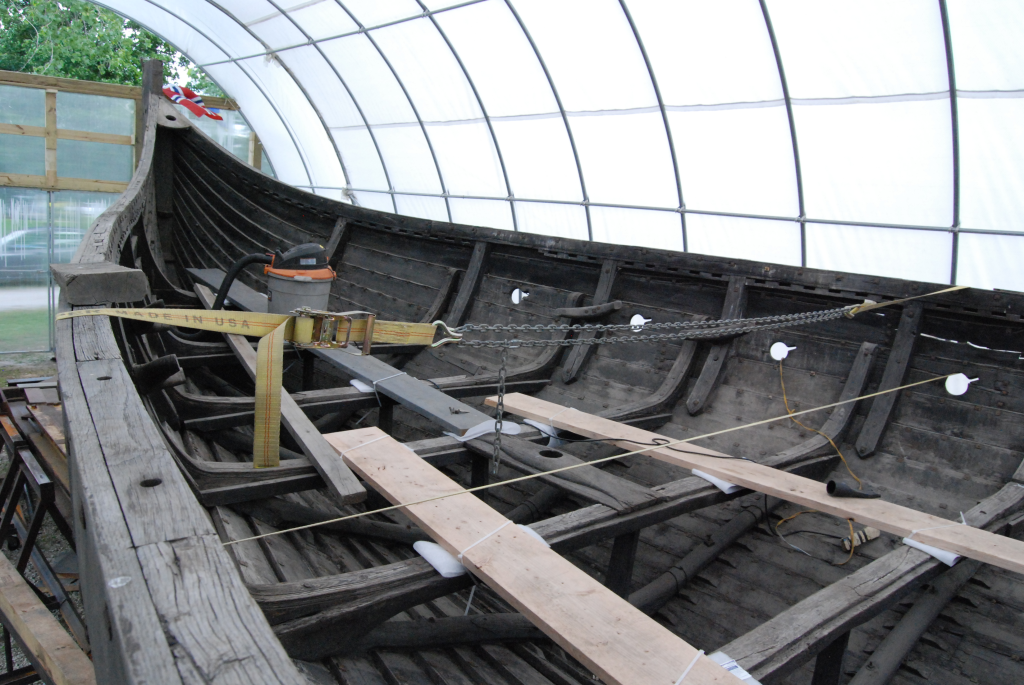
Inside, looking towards the front

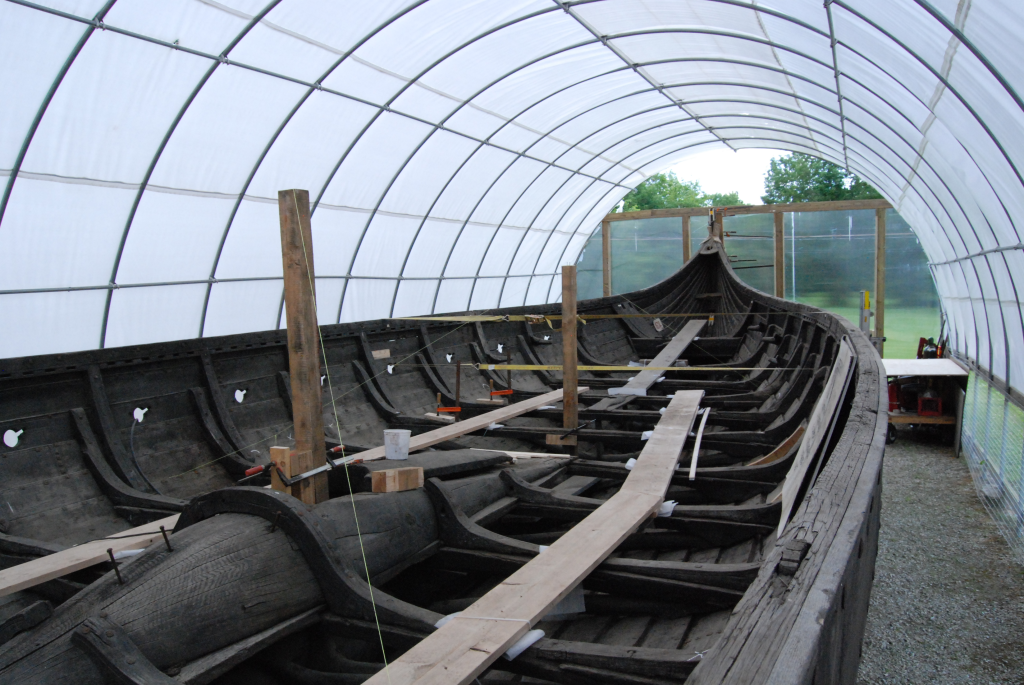
Inside, looking towards the rear

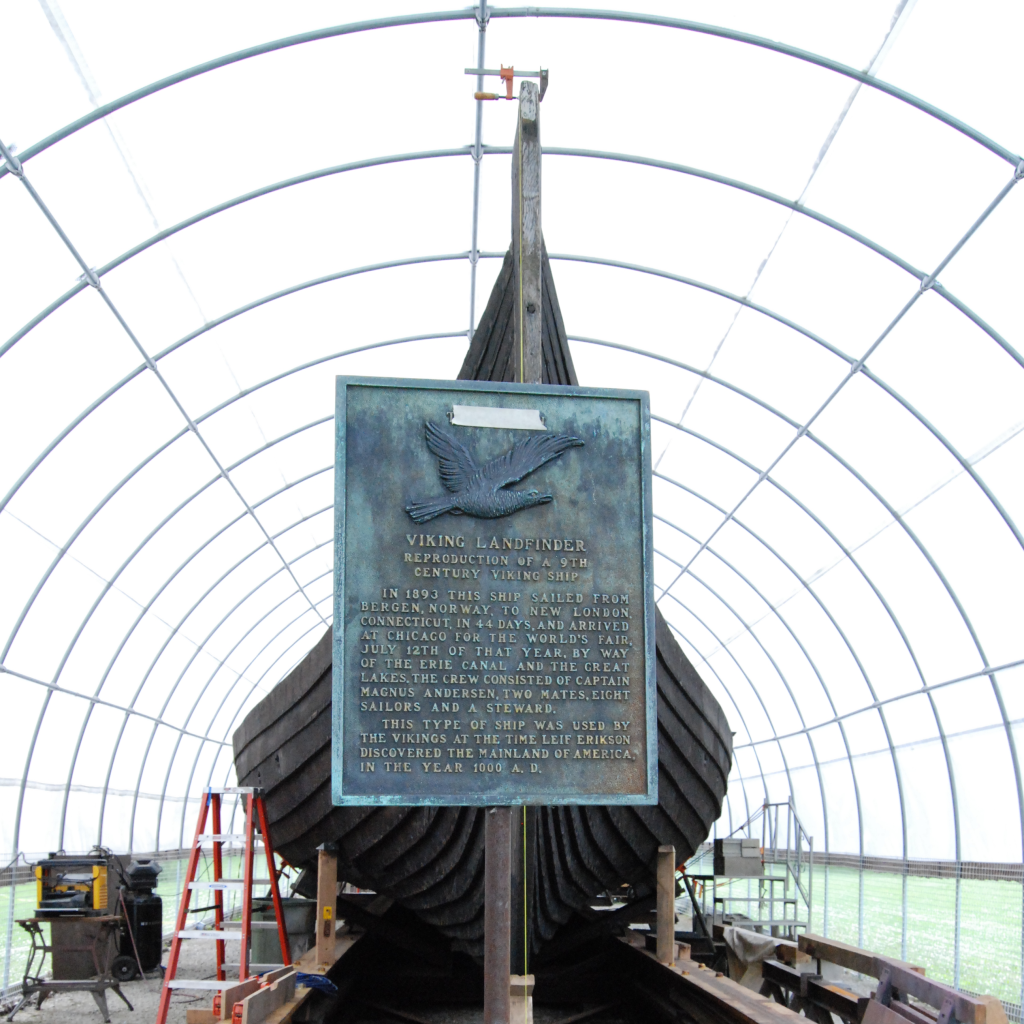
Front view

== See also ==
- Íslendingur: a later Viking replica ship to travel across the Atlantic
- ''Viking (replica Viking longship): Also on display at the World's Columbian Exposition
