= Gokstad ship =

9th-century Viking ship

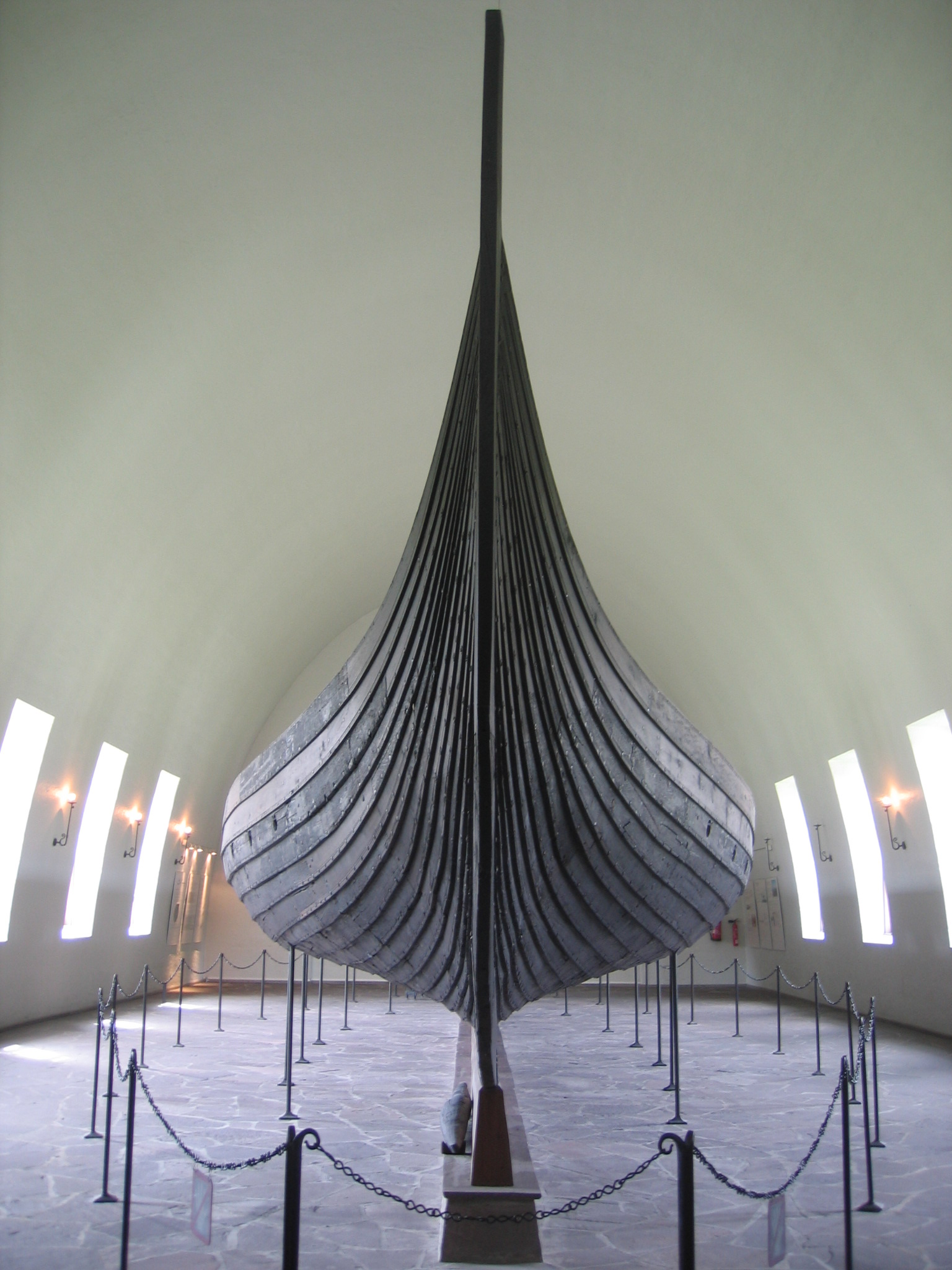
- The Gokstad ship at the Viking Ship Museum in Oslo, Norway

History
- Name: Gokstadskipet
- Completed: 9th century

General characteristics
- Type: Karve
- Length: 23.80 metres (78.1 ft)
- Beam: 5.10 m (16.7 ft)

The Gokstad ship is a Viking 9th-century longship found in a burial mound at Gokstad in Sandefjord Municipality in Vestfold county, Norway. It is displayed at the Viking Ship Museum in Oslo, Norway. It is the largest preserved Viking ship in Norway.

== Discovery ==
The site where the ship, "the finest and best preserved Viking longship", was discovered, situated on arable land, had long been named Gokstadhaugen or Kongshaugen (from the Old Norse words konungr meaning king and haugr meaning mound), although the relevance of its name had been discounted as folklore, as other sites in Norway bear similar names. In 1880, sons of the owner of Gokstad farm, having heard of the legends surrounding the site, uncovered the bow of a boat while digging in the still frozen ground. As word of the find got out, Nicolay Nicolaysen, then President of the Society for the Preservation of Ancient Norwegian Monuments, reached the site during February 1880. Having ascertained that the find was indeed that of an ancient artifact, he liaised for the digging to be stopped. Nicolaysen later returned and established that the mound still measured 50 metres by 43 metres, although its height had been diminished down to 5 metres by constant years of ploughing. With his team, he began excavating the mound from the side rather than from the top down, and on the second day of digging found the bow of the ship.

== Construction ==
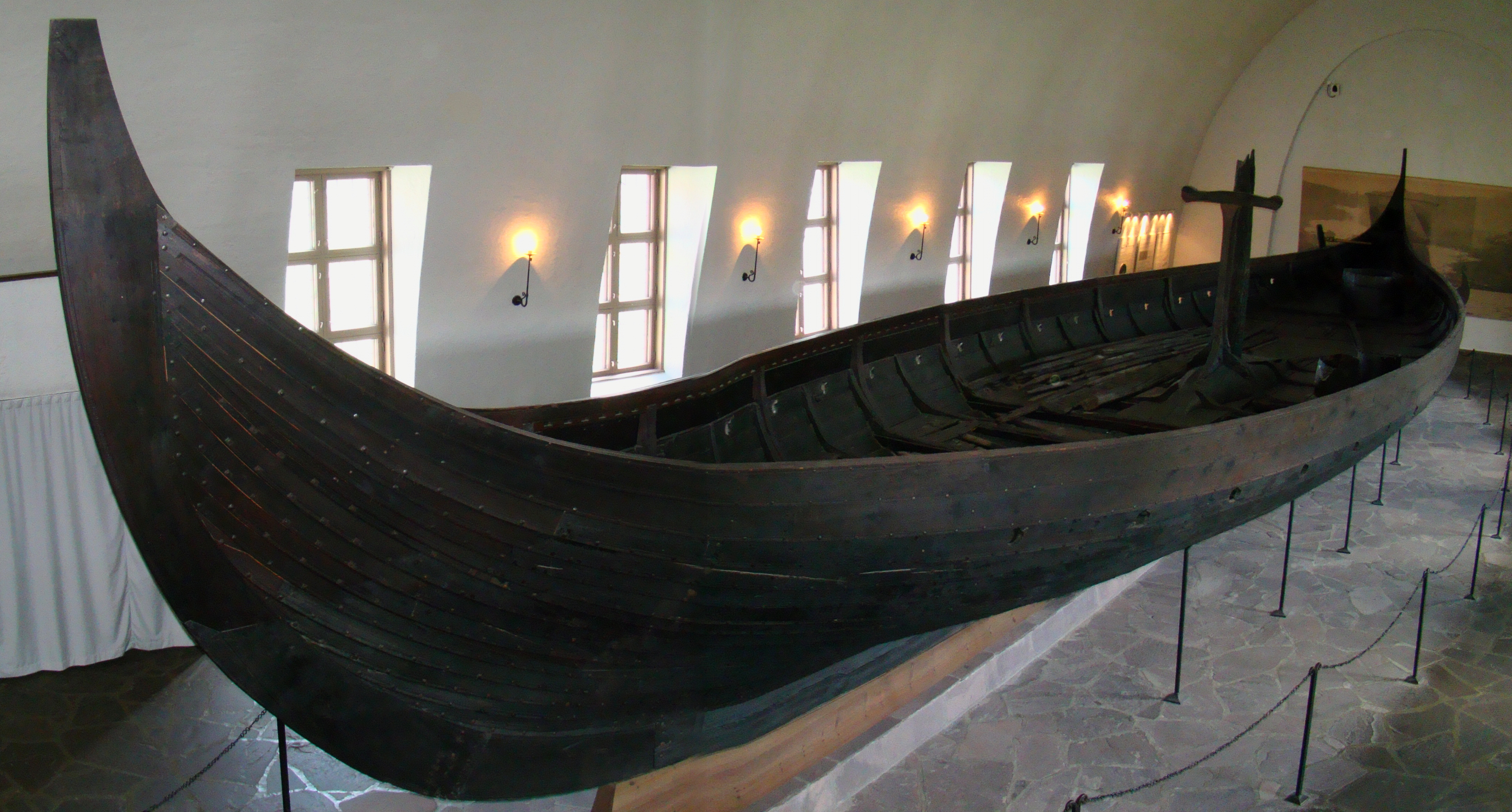
Side view of the ship

The Gokstad ship is clinker-built and constructed largely of oak. The ship was intended for warfare, trade, transportation of people and cargo. The ship is 23.80 metres (78.1 ft) long and 5.10 m (16.7 ft) wide. It is the largest in the Viking Ship Museum in Oslo. The ship was steered by a quarter rudder fastened to a large block of wood attached to the outside of the hull and supported by an extra stout rib. The block is known as the wart, and is fastened by osiers, bent willow shoots on the outside passed through both the rudder and wart to be firmly anchored in the ship.

There are 16 tapered planks per side. The garboard planks are near vertical where they attach to the keel. The garboard planks are narrow and remain only slightly wider to take the turn of the bilge. The topside planks are progressively wider. Each oak plank is slightly tapered in cross section to allow it to overlap about 30 mm the plank above and below in normal clinker (lapstrake) style. Iron rivets are about 180 mm apart where the planks lie straight and about 125 mm apart where the planks turn.

At the bow, all of the planks taper to butt the stem. The stem is carved from a single curved oak log to form the cutwater and has one land for each plank. The inside of the stem is hollowed into a v shape so the inside of the rivets can be reached during construction or repair. Each of the crossbeams has a ledge cut about 25 mm wide and deep to take a removable section of decking. Sea chests were placed on top of the decking to use when rowing. Most likely on longer voyages sea chests were secured below decks to act as ballast when sailing. The centre section of the keel has little rocker and together with flat midships transverse section the hull shape is suited to medium to flat water sailing. When sailing downwind in strong winds and waves, directional control would be poor, so it is likely that some reefing system was used to reduce sail area. In such conditions the ship would take water aboard at an alarming rate if sailed at high speed.

The method of fastening the planking to the frames above the waterline is by iron rivets in the form of iron nails driven from outside and then turned over a cinch plate on the inside. The lowest nine planks on each side of the keel up to the around the waterline are held to the frames by the archaic method of tying using withies. These nine bottom planks are also thinner than elsewhere being about 2.5 cm in thickness compared with a thickness of about 3 to 4 cm for the upper planks. The thinner bottom planks are formed with cleats projecting from their inner face to allow the planks and frames to be tied together using withies. The overall effect of this construction is to make the bottom of the ship lighter and more flexible. The 1893 'Viking' replica of the Gokstad ship reproduced this form of construction. The Viking's captain, Magnus Andersen, reported that the lightness and flexibility allowed the bottom to rise and fall up to 18 mm in heavy seas without leaking and the gunwale could twist up to 15 cm out of line. Speeds of around 10 or 11 knots were recorded.

From the beginning of the Viking Age through medieval times, Scandinavian ships were measured by how many rooms they had—these were the number of spaces between the crossbeams, with each room corresponding to a pair of oars. The Gokstad ship has 16 rooms, and therefore 32 oars. The oar holes could be hatched down when the ship was under sail. It utilized a square sail of approximately 110 square metres (1,200 ft^{2}), which, it is estimated, could propel the ship to over 12 knots (22 km/h; 14 mph). The mast could be raised and lowered. While the ship was traveling in shallow water, the rudder could be raised very quickly by undoing the fastening. Dendrochronological dating suggests that the ship was built of timber that was felled around 890 AD. This period is the height of Norse expansion in Dublin, Ireland and York, England. The Gokstad ship was commissioned at the end of the 9th century during the reign of King Harald Fairhair.

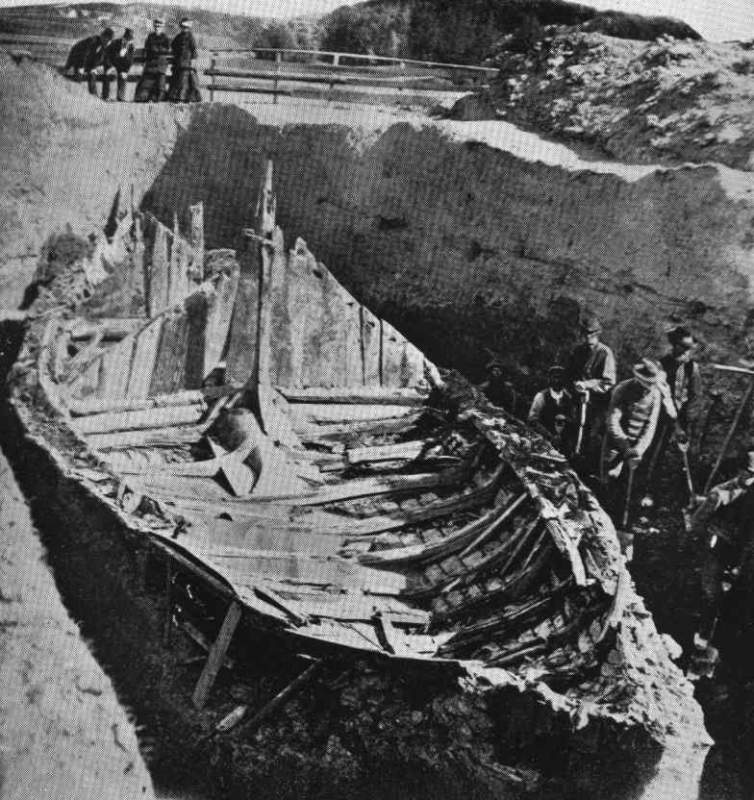
Gokstad Viking ship excavation. Gokstad Mound, 1880

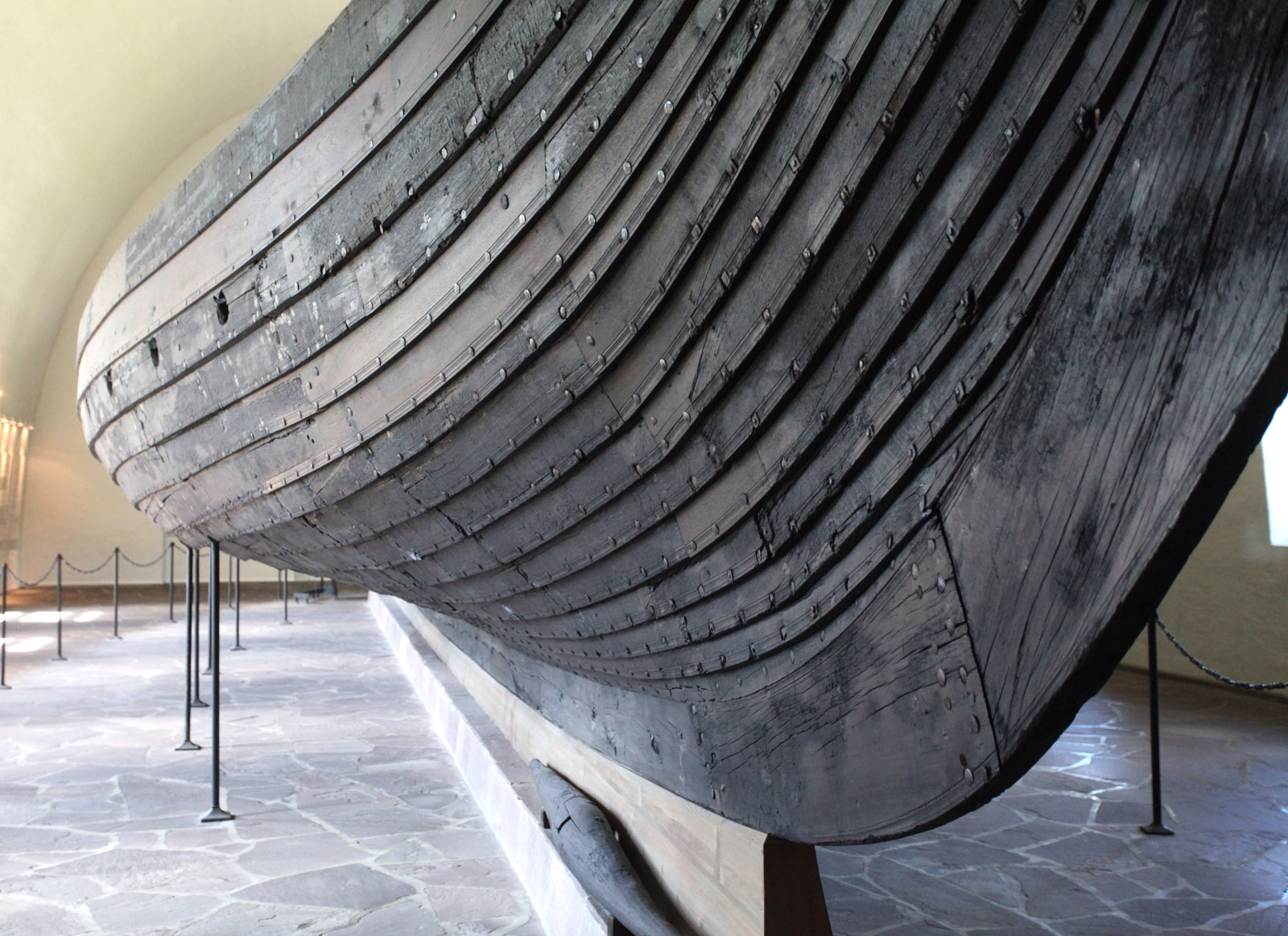
Gokstad ship bow planking

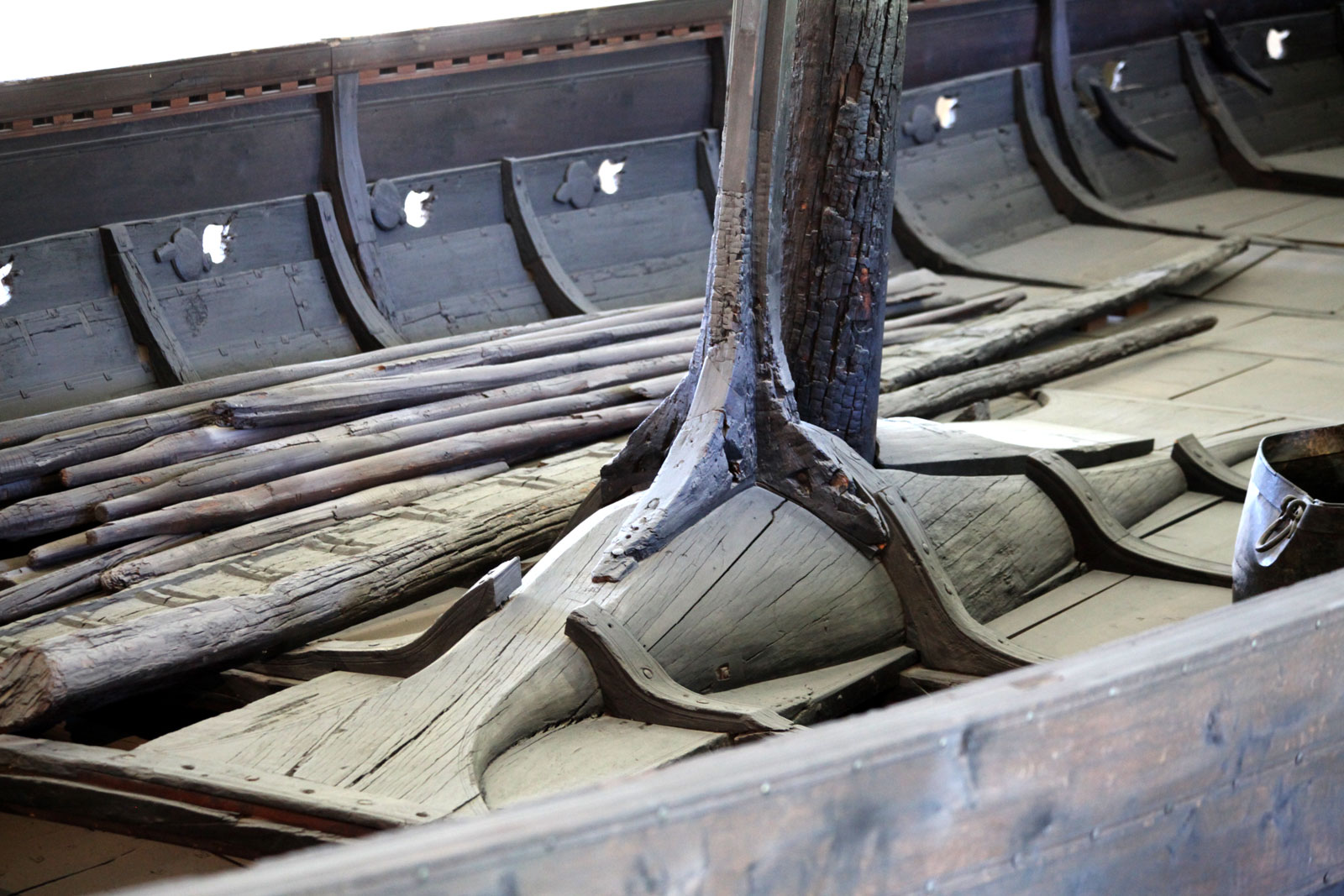
Gokstad ship : detail of mast step

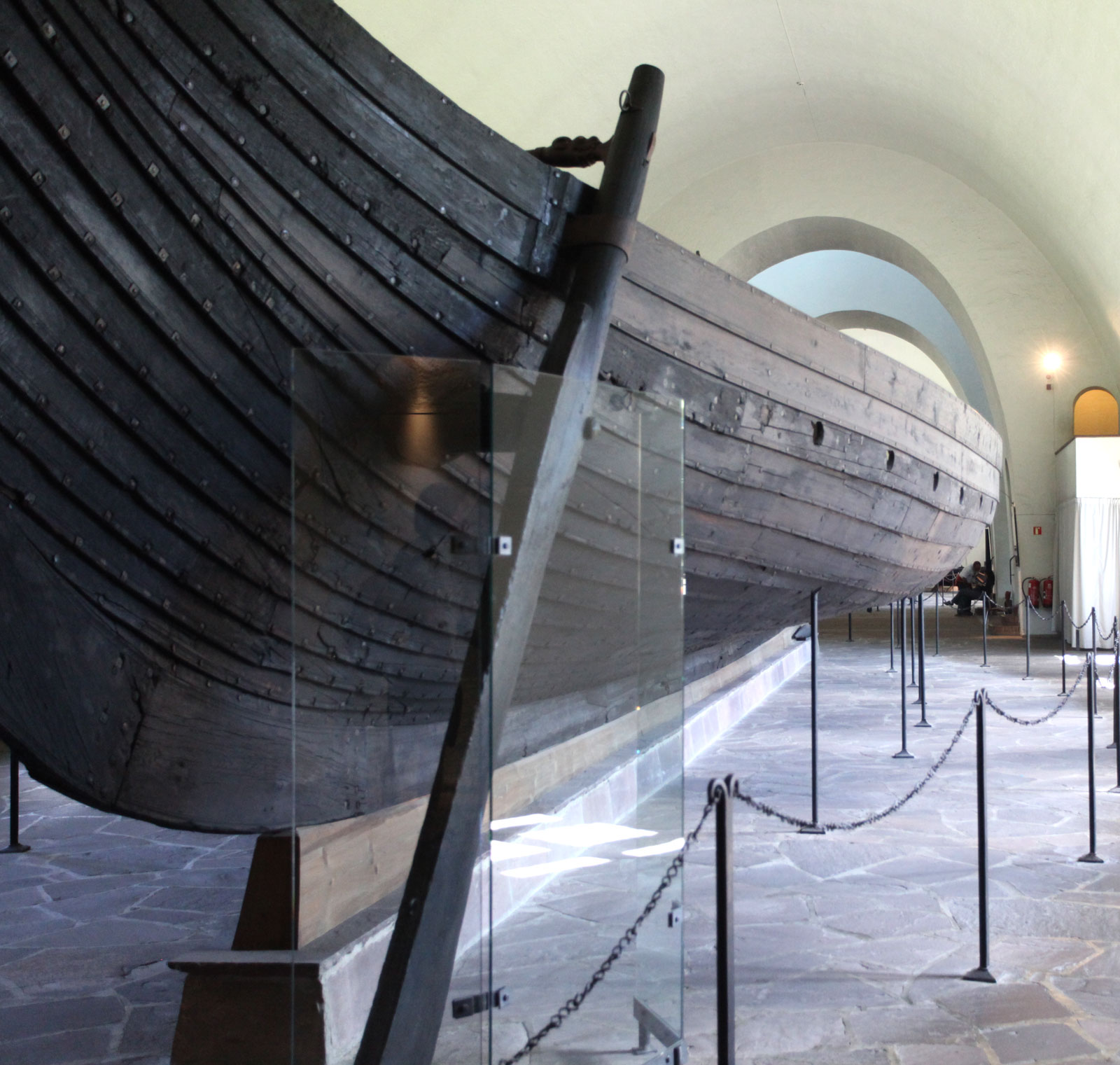
Gokstad ship steering oar

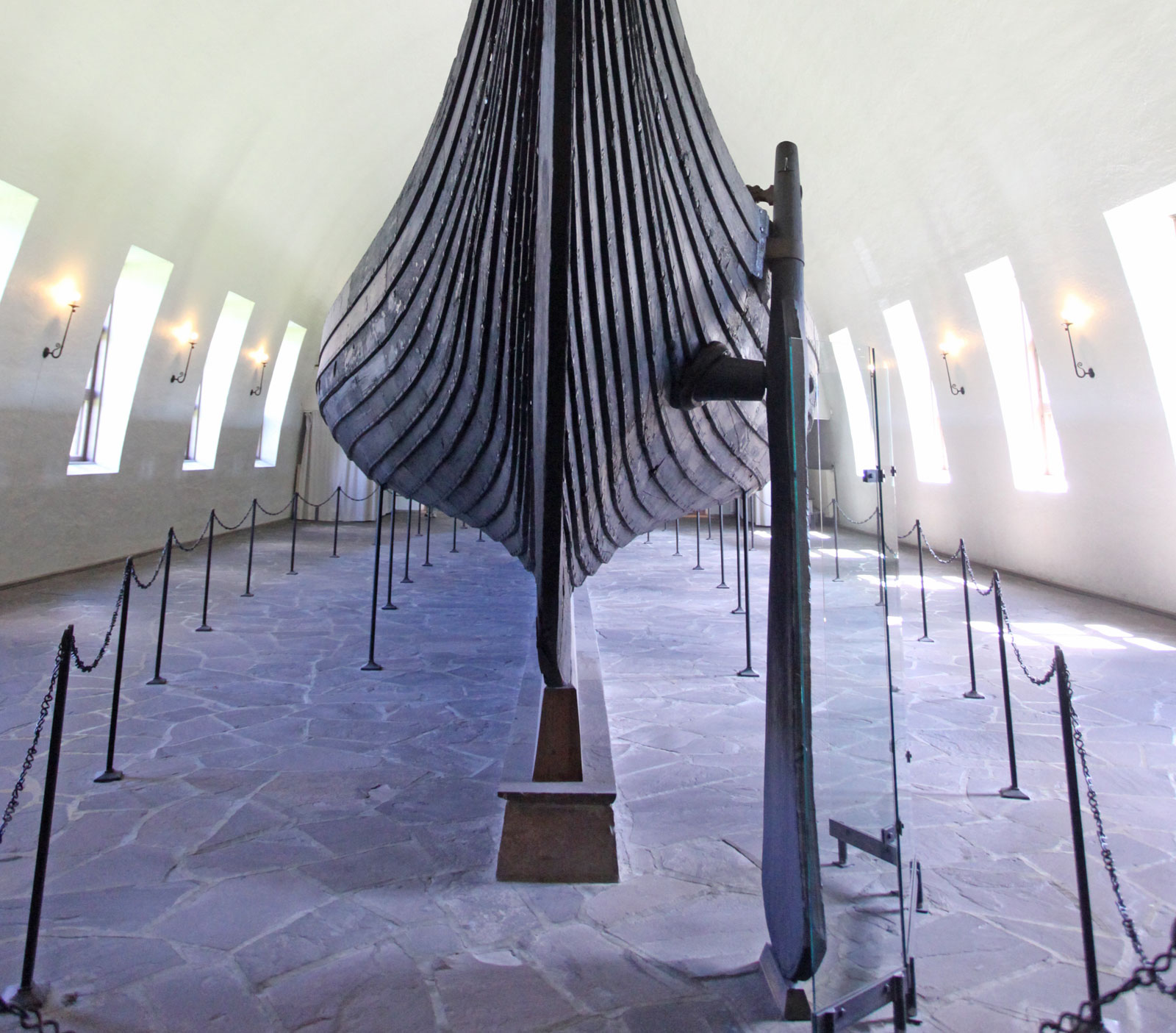
Gokstad ship stern

== Human remains and grave goods ==
During the excavations, a human skeleton was found in a bed inside a timber-built burial chamber. The skeleton was that of a man aged approximately forty to fifty years old, of powerful build and between 181 and 183 cm (5’11" to 6') tall; his identity is unknown. The bones of twelve horses, six dogs, and one peacock were found laid out around the man's body. In the 1920s Professor Anton Willem Brogger of the University of Oslo asserted that the man was King Olaf Gudrodson, gout-ridden son of the elderly king Gudrod of Vestfold. But this has not been sufficiently proven.

The grave was furnished with grave goods in addition to the ship itself: three small boats, a tent, a sledge, and riding equipment. Other grave goods were probably plundered in ancient times: the excavation in 1880 found no gold or silver. In the Viking period, weapons were considered an important part of a man's grave goods, but again, none were found in the Gokstad ship.

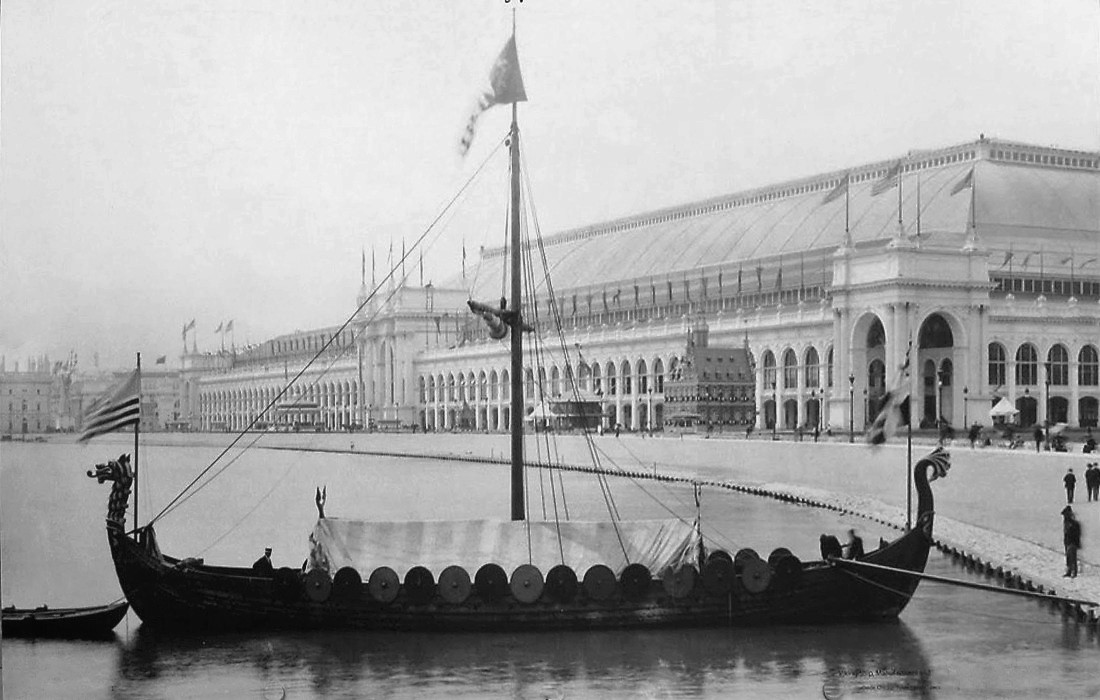
Gokstad ship replica Viking at the World's Columbian Exposition Chicago in 1893

== Public exhibition ==
The ship, the reconstructed burial chamber, two of the small boats and two tent boards from the burial chamber are displayed in the Viking Ship Museum located on Bygdøy peninsula in Oslo, Norway. Some other artifacts that survived the plundering are also on display in the museum. After thirteen years of debate regarding a possible relocation, Education Minister Kristin Halvorsen stated on May 3, 2012, that the ship would not be moved from Bygdøy.

== Replicas ==
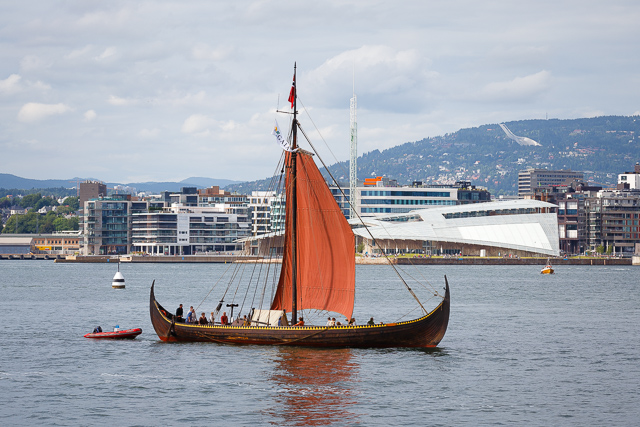
The Gaia ship in Oslo in July 2014.

Viking, an exact replica of the Gokstad ship, crossed the Atlantic Ocean from Bergen, Norway to be exhibited at the World's Columbian Exposition in Chicago in 1893; it remains on exhibit near Chicago.

The Gaia ship is an exact replica of the Gokstad ship. Gaia was constructed during the winter of 1989–1990 in Bjørkedal in Volda Municipality. On May 17, 1991, it was sailed by Ragnar Thorseth to North America to mark the 1000th anniversary of Leiv Eriksson’s founding of Vinland. It was named Gaia on June 19, 1991, by Vigdis Finnbogadottir, the President of Iceland, during this voyage. In May 1993, the vessel was donated to the city of Sandefjord by Knut Utstein Kloster of the Gaia Ship Foundation and this remains its home port. The ship's oak mast is constructed in one piece and stone provides ballast. Gaia can reach ten knots under its full canvas, which is 120 sq. m., and it has sixteen pairs of oars. Gaia also sailed to the Rio de Janeiro Earth Summit via the Faroe Islands, Iceland, Greenland, and North America.

Other replicas include Munin, a half-scale replica in Vancouver, British Columbia, Canada, the Íslendingur in the Viking World museum in Iceland, the Hugin, in Ramsgate, England, and a replica at the Hjemkomst Center in Moorhead, Minnesota.

== See also ==
- Gjellestad ship, a longship discovered in 2019 that is similar in size to the Gokstad ship.

== Related Reading ==
- Vinner, Max (2002) Boats of the Viking Ship Museum (Viking Ship Museum) ISBN 978-8785180636
- Williams, Gareth (2014) The Viking Ship (British Museum Press) ISBN 978-0714123400
