= Gaia ship =

Replica of the Gokstad ship

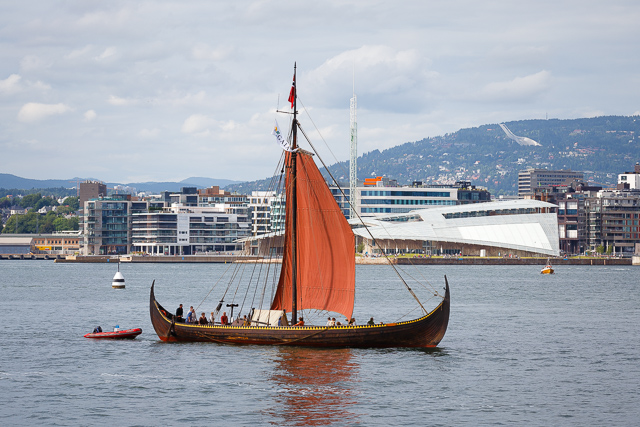
- Gaia in Oslo, 2014

History

Norway
- Name: Gaia ship
- Namesake: Greek goddess Gaia
- Operator: Gokstad Coastal Team (Gokstad kystlag)
- Builder: Jacob Bjørkedal
- Completed: 1990
- Homeport: Sandefjord, Norway
- Status: Active

General characteristics
- Type: Viking ship replica (Museum ship)
- Tonnage: 26
- Length: 23.80 metres (78.1 ft)
- Beam: 5.10 m (16.7 ft)
- Height: 18 metres (59 ft) (mast)
- Draught: 0.85 metres (2.8 ft)
- Propulsion: Sail and oars, auxiliary engine
- Sail plan: 230 m²
- Speed: max. 10 kn (19 km/h)
- Complement: 40 passengers

The Gaia ship is a replica of the 9th century Viking Gokstad ship. It was built in 1990 and departed Bergen for North America on 17 May 1991. It was named Hav-Cella prior to departing but was renamed Gaia by Vigdís Finnbogadóttir, President of Iceland, during a stopover in Iceland. Gaia is the name for the goddess of the Earth in Greek mythology. The Gaia ship reached Newfoundland on 2 August and Washington, D.C. on Leif Erikson Day, 9 October 1991. It further sailed to the Rio de Janeiro Earth Summit via the Faroe Islands, Iceland, Greenland and North America.

With the completion of Museum's Wharf by Sandefjord Museum in the summer of 1995, Gaia and the newly restored Southern Actor were permanently placed on the wharf where they remain accessible to the public.

The ship can be rented for private tours in the fjord.

== History ==
In the late 1980s, Knut Utstein Kloster was cosponsoring a millennial celebration for Leif Eriksson's voyage to North America, "Vinland Revisited." To re-enact this voyage, Kloster requested an exact replica of the 1,000-year-old Gokstad ship.

The Gaia ship is an exact replica of the Gokstad ship. It was constructed during the winter of 1989–1990 in Bjørkedal in Volda Municipality. On 17 May 1991 it was sailed by Ragnar Thorseth to North America to mark the 1000th anniversary of Leif Eriksson's founding of Vinland. It was named Gaia on 19 June 1991 by Vigdis Finnbogadottir, the President of Iceland, during this voyage. While in on its voyage, a number of prominent people visited the ship, including President George H. W. Bush in the U.S. and Fidel Castro in Cuba. In May 1993, the vessel was donated to the city of Sandefjord by Knut Utstein Kloster of the Gaia Ship Foundation. The ship's oak mast is constructed in one piece and stone provides ballast. Gaia can reach ten knots under its full canvas, which is 120 sq. m., and has sixteen pairs of oars.

=== Earth Summit ===
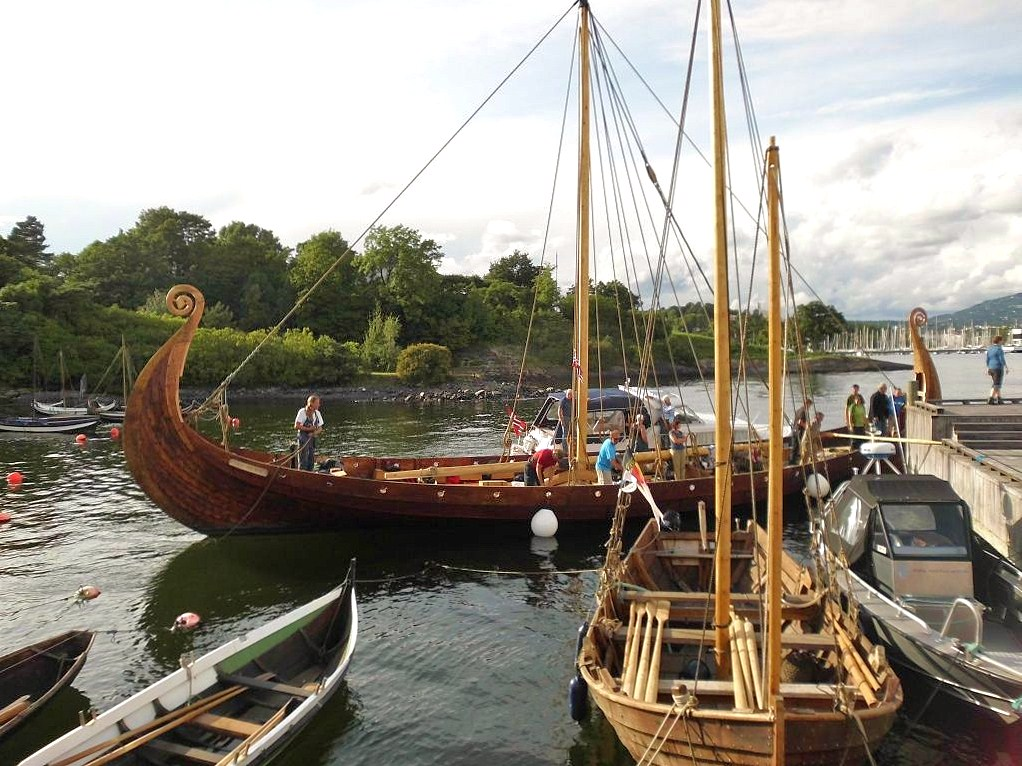

While preparing for the Smithsonian conference, owner Knut Utstein Kloster considered other ways the ship could serve a purpose. After considering the upcoming Earth Summit scheduled for Brazil in June 1992, he worked with World City America, Inc. CEO John S. Rogers in New York and Maurice Strong at the UN to make sure the ship sailed on to Rio de Janeiro after its stop in Washington, D.C. Agreement was made with UNICEF Executive Director James P. Grant to let Gaia sail under the UNICEF banner "keep the promise for a better world for all children." In the United States, Gaia first anchored in New York at the East River outside the UN headquarters on Manhattan. School children read messages addressed to world leaders. After Washington D.C., Gaia sailed on to Port Canaveral where astronaut Jim Lovell and Jim Lovelock addressed a crowd at the ship. From Florida, Gaia sailed to Cuba, Mexico, the Dominican Republic, Puerto Rico, Jamaica, Antigua, Guadeloupe, Martinique, St. Lucia, Trinidad, Venezuela, Guyana, Suriname, and Manaus, Brazil. It was a 15,000-mile journey from Norway to Brazil.

Queen Sonja of Norway and President Vigdís Finnbogadóttir of Iceland waited at the harbor for Gaia's arrival in Washington, D.C. President George H. W. Bush went on board the ship with two of his grandsons.

Kloster's World City Discovery in co-operation with AFS Intercultural Programs gathered 150 school children representing 43 countries at the Gaia Camp Amazonas. Manaus, the capital of the Brazilian state of Amazonas, embraced the idea of a Gaia Camp Amazonas, and a 28-hectare (69-acre) public park with hiking trails was established. The park would serve as a living laboratory as a rainforest microcosm. The park's layout and planning were done by the University of Costa Rica. The children at Gaia Camp Amazonas spent a total of three weeks constructing trails, steps, bridges, and resting areas in Manaus's Gaia Park. Interpretive signs were also installed describing the local wildlife and flora.

== See also ==
- Íslendingur
- Gokstad ship
- Gokstad Mound

== Literature ==
- Vinner, Max (2002). Boats of the Viking Ship Museum (Viking Ship Museum) ISBN 978-8785180636
- Williams, Gareth (2014). The Viking Ship (British Museum Press) ISBN 978-0714123400
- Wexelsen, Einar (1981). Gokstadfunnet: et 100-års minne / The Gokstad Excavations: Centenary of a Norwegian Viking Find (Sandefjordmuseene). ISBN 82-990595-2-6.
