= Karvi =

Karvi can refer to:

- Strobilanthes callosa, a species of plant
- Karve (ship), a type of Viking ship
