= Wilhelm Nicolaysen =

Norwegian barrister and businessperson (1869–1944)

Wilhelm Lorentz Lexau Nicolaysen (16 February 1869 – 22 July 1944) was a Norwegian barrister and businessperson.

He was born in Kristiania as a son of professor of medicine Julius Nicolaysen (1831–1909) and Bolette Marie Berentine Nicolaysen (1835–1922). He was a brother of professor of medicine Johan Nicolaysen and banker Lyder Wenzel Nicolaysen, uncle of chief physician Knud Dahl Nicolaysen, nephew of Nicolay Nicolaysen and second cousin of Niels Aars Nicolaysen. In 1919 he married Fredrikke Dorothea Hagerup, daughter of Prime Minister Francis Hagerup and since 1919 a court mistress for the Norwegian royal family.

He finished his secondary education in 1887, graduated with the cand.jur. degree in 1893 and started working as an attorney; later barrister. He started his own law firm in 1895, was a partner with H. Schjoldager between 1911 and 1919 before continuing on his own again.

He co-founded of the company De-No-Fa in 1912, and served as board chairman for decades. From 1931 to 1934 he was also a board member of Lilleborg Fabriker. He died in July 1944, followed by his wife in June 1946.

Nicolaysen was member of Fatherland League.
