= Nicolaisen =

Nicolaisen or Nikolaisen is a surname. The following individuals have the surname:

- Donald Nicolaisen, American politician
- Elvira Nikolaisen (born 1980), Norwegian singer/songwriter
- Emil Nikolaisen (born 1977), Norwegian musician and producer
- Kaia Wøien Nicolaisen (born in 1990), Norwegian biathlete
- Petra Nicolaisen (born 1965), German politician
- Rasmus Nicolaisen (born 1997), Danish footballer
- W. F. H. Nicolaisen (1927–2016) German folklorist, linguist, medievalist, and scholar

== See also ==
- Nicolaysen, surname
