= Íslendingur =

Replica of Gokstad viking ship

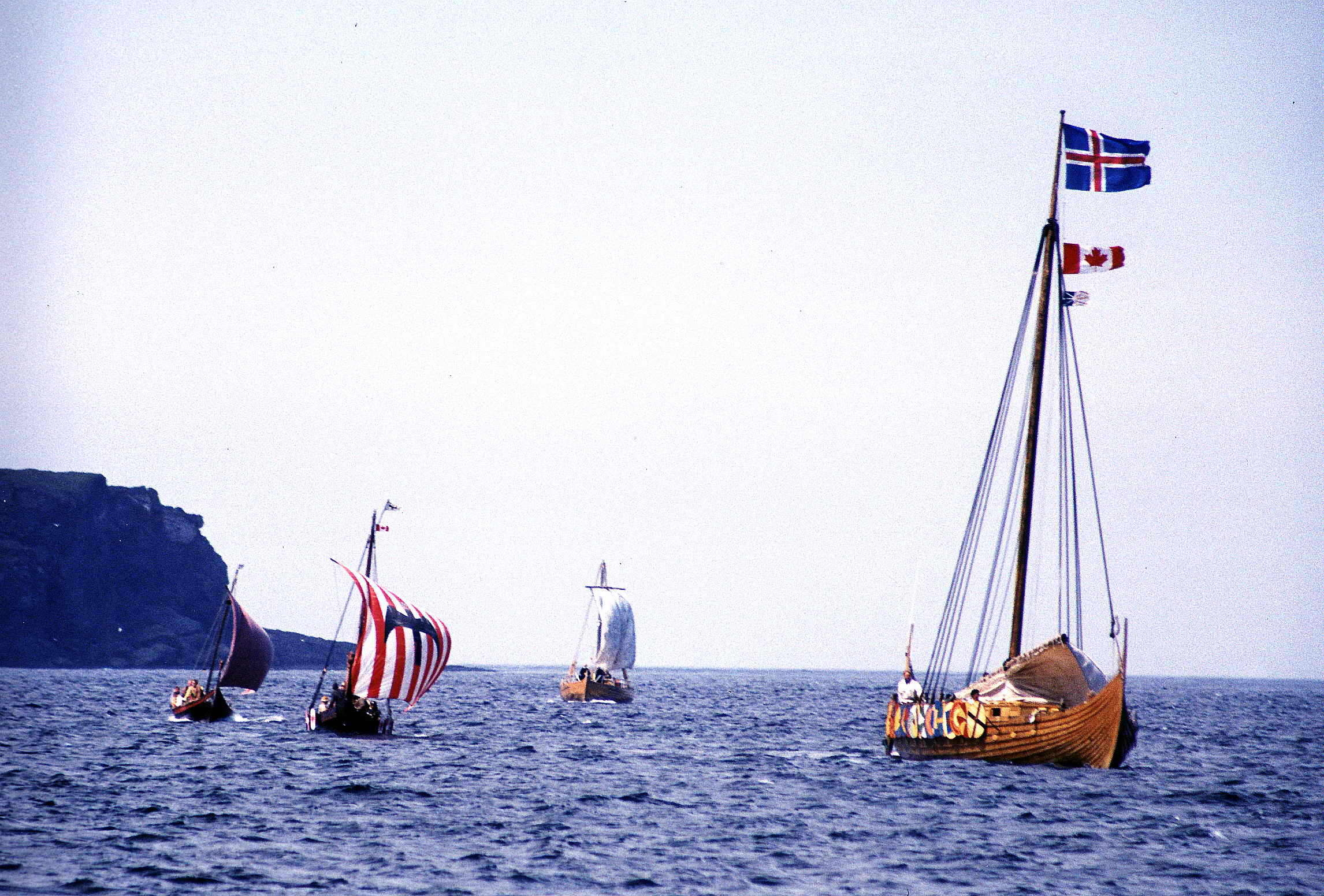
- Íslendingur arriving at L'Anse aux Meadows in 2000

History

Iceland
- Name: Íslendingur
- Builder: Gunnar Marel Eggertsson
- Laid down: 1996
- Out of service: 2008
- Status: On display

General characteristics
- Class & type: Viking sail ship
- Tonnage: 80 gross tons
- Length: 22.5 m
- Beam: 5.3 m
- Draught: 1.7 m
- Complement: 9

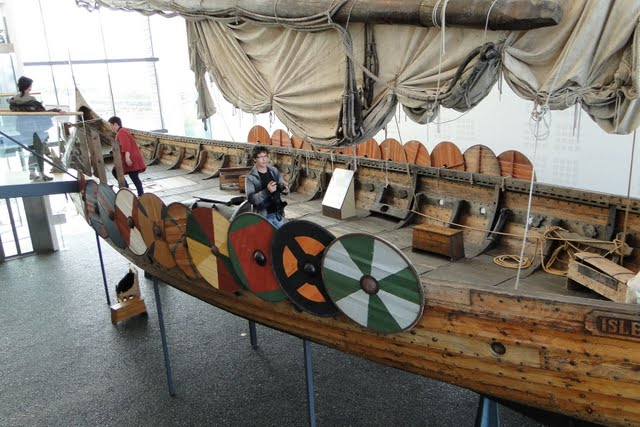
Íslendingur on display at the Viking World museum

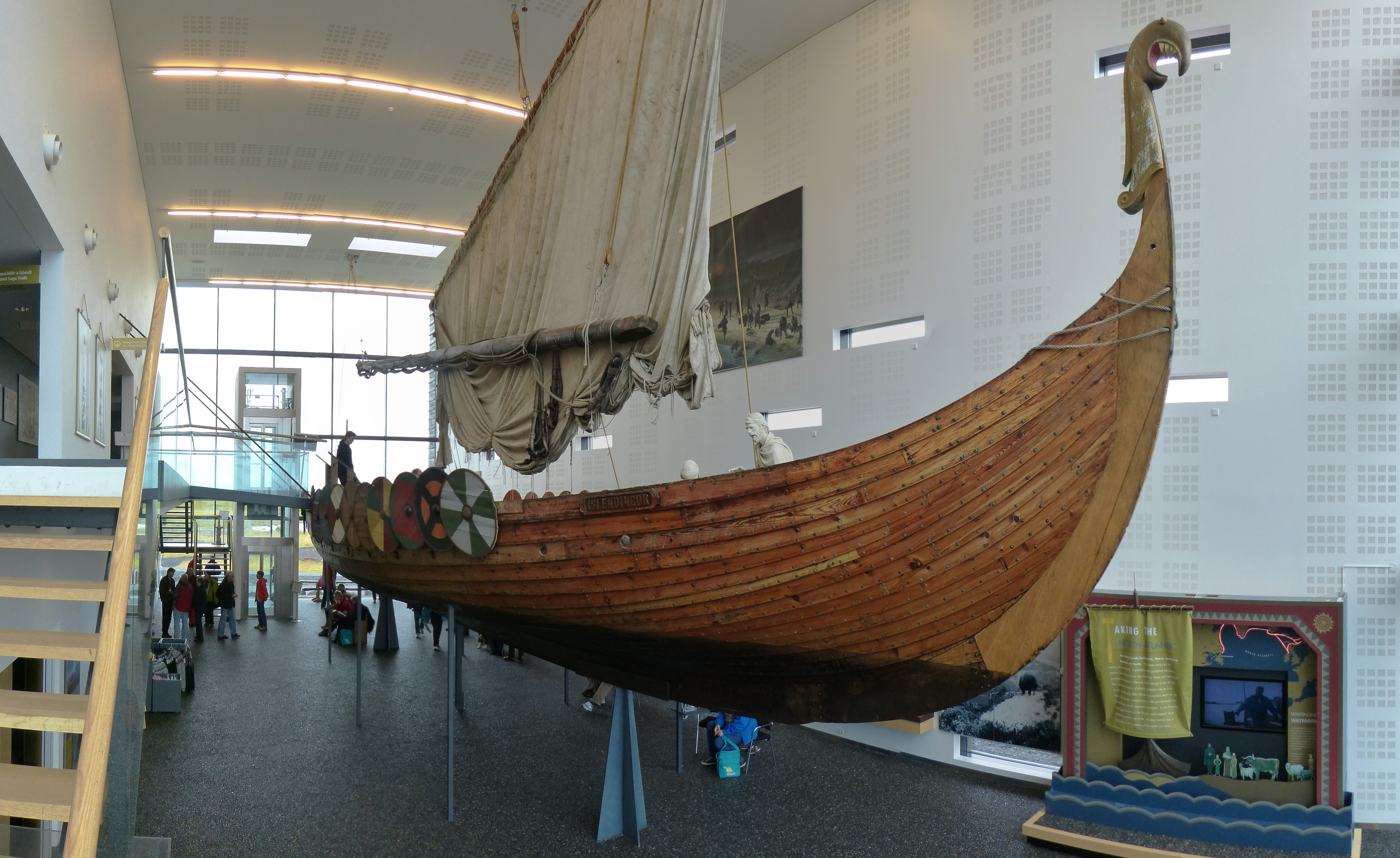
Íslendingur at the Viking World museum

Íslendingur (Icelandic pronunciation: [ˈislɛntiŋkʏr̥], "Icelander") is a replica of the Gokstad viking ship and was sailed across the Atlantic Ocean in 2000. It is on display at the Viking World museum in Njarðvík, Reykjanesbær, Iceland.

The ship was built in 1996 by Gunnar Marel Eggertsson, a shipwright from the Westman Islands who skippered the Norwegian Gokstad ship copy Gaia on her voyage to Washington, D.C. in 1991. Íslendingur measures 22.5 metres in length, 5.3 metres in breadth, has a draught of 1.7 metres and measures 80 gross tons. She was built of 18 tonnes of Norwegian and Swedish oak and required 5,000 nails. Her sail was made in Denmark. Her crew complement is 9; the Gokstad ship carried 70. Her average speed is 7 knots, top speed 18 knots. She is equipped with an engine for occasional use but is otherwise an authentic copy, made with ancient techniques.

The ship was initially used to teach Icelandic children about the Viking Age. In 1998, Marel decided to sail her across the Atlantic as part of the millennial celebration in 2000 of his ancestor Leif Eriksson's voyage to Vinland. He founded Íslending hf. to raise money for the venture.

The ship set sail from Reykjavík on Icelandic National Day, 17 June, with Marel skippering and a crew of eight including one woman, Ellen Ingvadottir, who kept the weblog of the voyage. Her first port of call was Búðardalur in Hvammsfjörður, where she took part in celebrations at Eiríksstaðir, where Erik the Red lived and his son Leif was born. Despite a 10-hour ordeal with bad weather off Cape Farewell, she arrived on 15 July at Brattahlíð in Greenland for the celebration of the viking settlement attended by Queen Margrethe II of Denmark. On 28 July she arrived at L'Anse aux Meadows, Newfoundland, the single viking settlement to have been discovered on the mainland North American continent and thought to be the site of the Vinland settlement, where she participated in the celebrations with other replica viking ships.

From there the ship sailed, via several ports of call in Newfoundland, to New York City, where she arrived on 5 October, approximately 3 months after the start of the voyage. Íslendingur was laid up in Westbrook, Connecticut. A deal to use her in advertising fell through because of the 9/11 attacks. In 2002 she was purchased by an Icelandic consortium led by the region of Southern Peninsula. She was displayed in the open air on the coast in Reykjanesbær until she could be moved into the newly constructed Viking World museum in 2008. She is suspended one and a half metres above the ground so that visitors can walk underneath her hull and observe the workmanship.

== Sources ==
- Heroic Age 3: Archaeology Digest "Vikings and Picts: Leif Ericsson Anniversary Celebrations" (2000)
- Sonya Procenko, "Modern-day Vikings re-enact Ericson's discovery of North America", Newfoundland Flotilla 2000, June 16, 2000.
- Transcript of CNN interview with Gunnar Eggertsson at L'Anse aux Meadows, aired October 9, 2000
