= Viking World museum =

Location

- Víkingaheimar
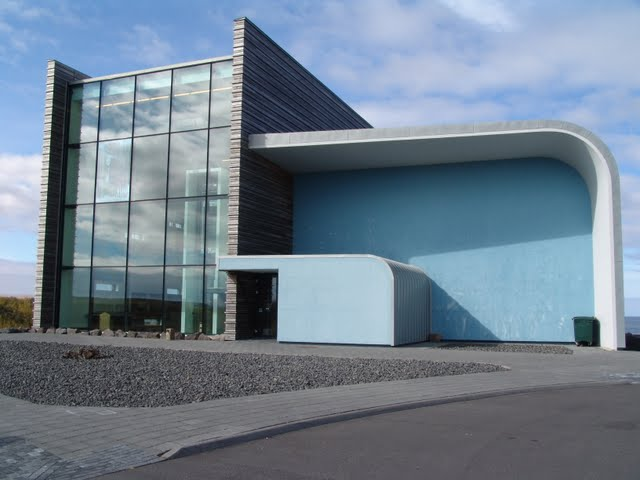
- Viking World Museum
- Established: 8 May 2009
- Location: Njarðvík, Reykjanesbær, Iceland
- Coordinates: 63°58′34″N 22°31′42″W
- Architect: Guðmundur Jónsson
- Website: vikingworld.is

Viking World (Icelandic: Víkingaheimar [ˈviːciŋkaˌheiːmar̥]) is a museum in Njarðvík, Reykjanesbær, Iceland.

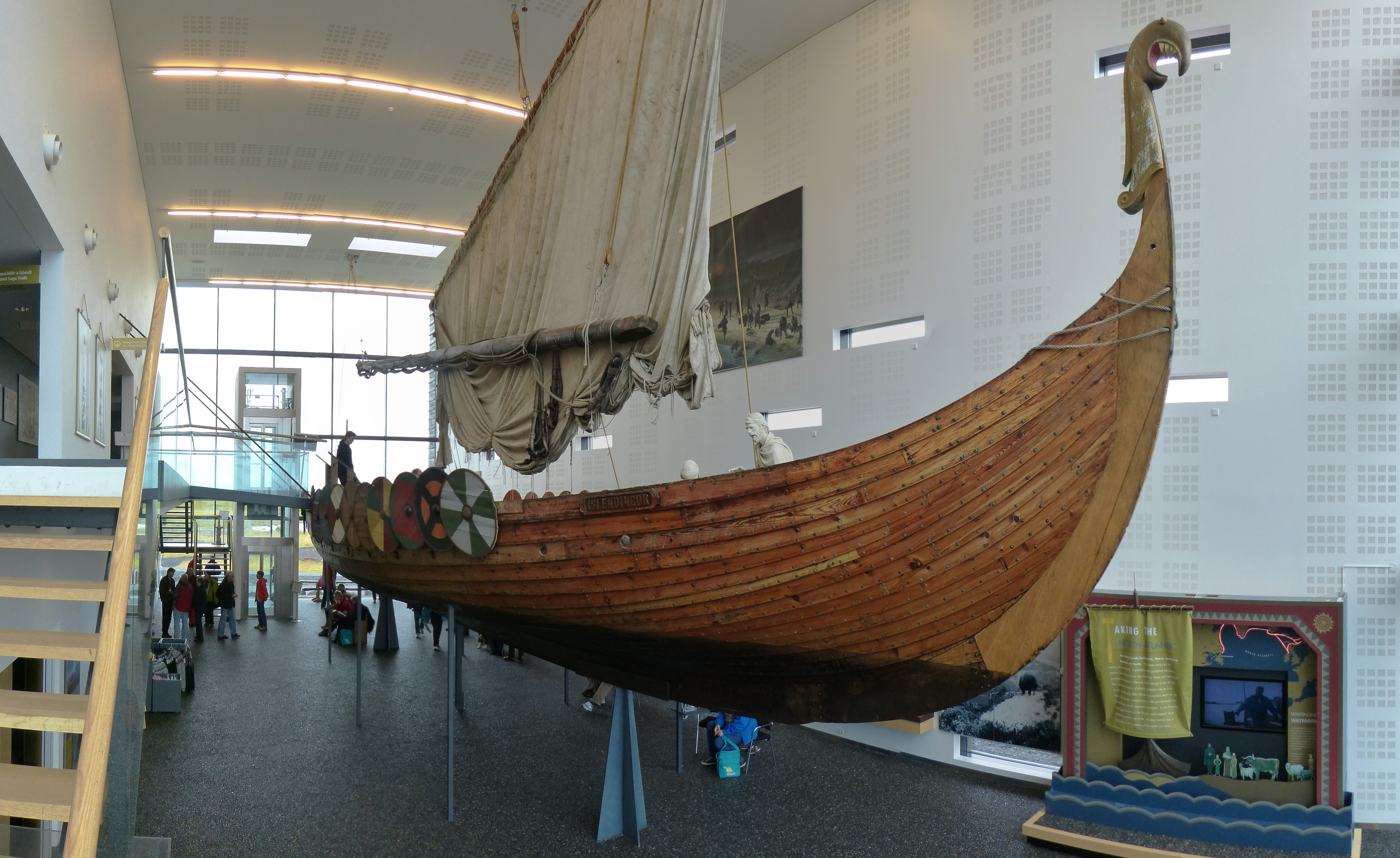
Íslendingur, a replica of the Gokstad Viking ship

The museum opened on 8 May 2009, followed by a formal opening on Icelandic National Day, 17 June. The director was Elisabeth Ward; the building was designed by Guðmundur Jónsson.

Viking World has on permanent display the Íslendingur, the replica of the Gokstad Viking ship which in 2000 was sailed across the Atlantic Ocean to L'Anse aux Meadows, Newfoundland, for the celebrations of the millennium of Leif Ericsson's voyage and then to New York. The ship was returned to Iceland and placed on exhibit in the open air until being transferred to the new museum in autumn 2008. She is suspended one and a half metres in the air so that visitors can walk underneath her hull and see the workmanship. There are also stairs and a walkway into the ship, enabling visitors to climb aboard and sit or walk around.

The museum also houses the exhibition Vikings—The North Atlantic Saga from the Smithsonian Institution in Washington, D.C. On 1 December 2010, a 2-year temporary exhibition with materials on loan from the National Museum of Iceland opened with a heathen reburial ceremony for a body excavated at Hafurbjarnarstaðir in 1868. The exhibits include materials from recent archaeological excavations.

The museum came under new ownership in June 2015, with Sveinn V. Björgvinsson as managing director and Björn Jónasson as business manager. The museum at that time had four employees, two full-time; the new management hoped to expand it to attract travelling exhibitions and possibly to add a café.
