= Julius Nicolaysen =

Norwegian professor of medicine

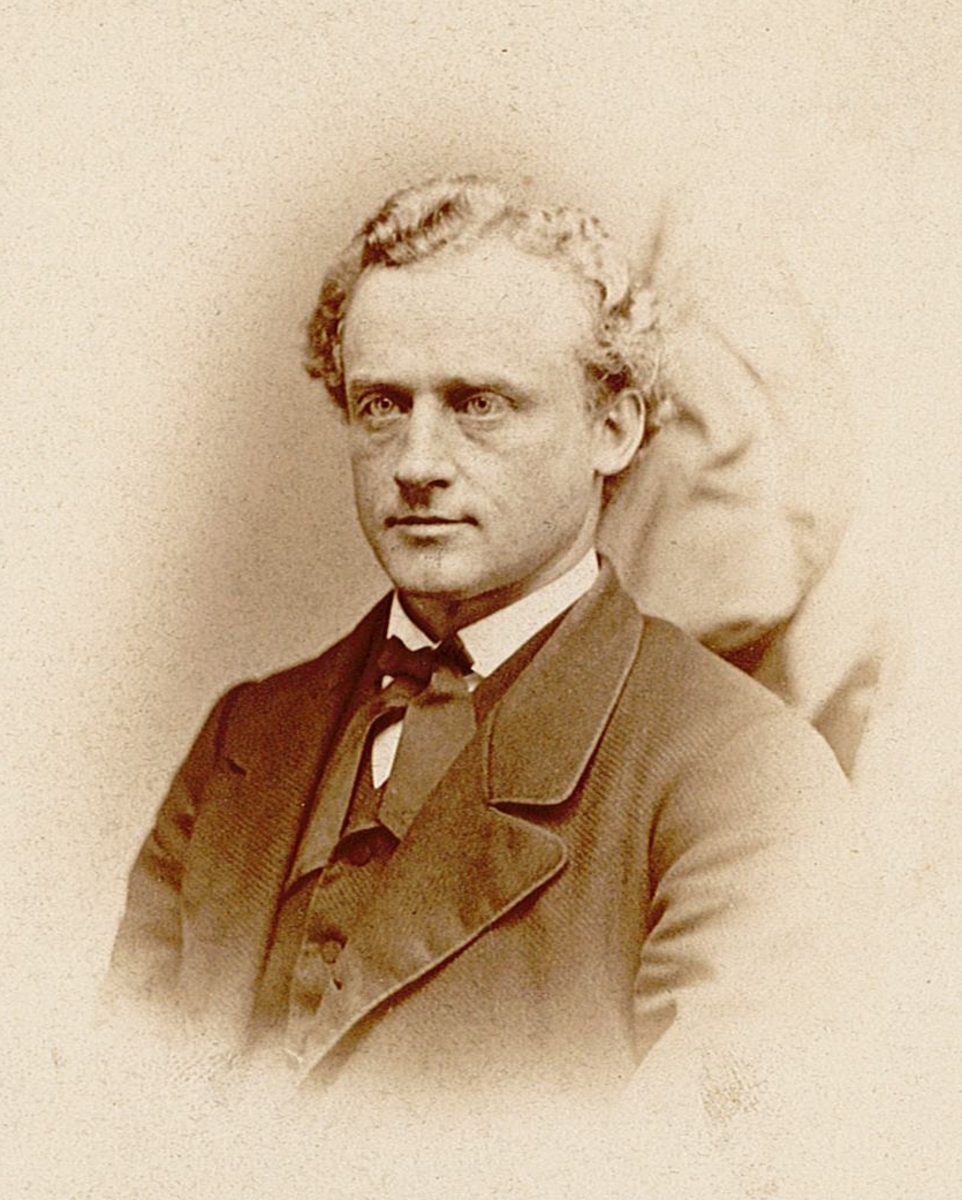
Julius Nicolaysen – Oslo Museum -

Julius Nicolaysen (31 July 1831 – 25 December 1909) was a Norwegian professor of medicine.

== Personal life ==
He was born in Bergen as a son of merchant and banker Lyder Wentzel Nicolaysen (1794–1876) and Cathrine Margrethe Wilhelmine Bernhoft (1808–1871). He was a half-brother of Nicolay Nicolaysen and first cousin of Niels Aars Nicolaysen.

In April 1859 in Borre he married his first cousin Bolette Marie Berentine Nicolaysen (1835–1922). They had the sons Johan Nicolaysen, Lyder Wenzel Nicolaysen and Wilhelm Nicolaysen. He was also an uncle of Lyder Wentzel Christie Nicolaysen and grandfather of Knud Dahl Nicolaysen.

== Career ==
He finished his secondary education in 1849, and graduated from the Royal Frederick University with the cand.med. degree in 1856. He worked in Christiania, Kragerø, and Møre, before becoming a surgeon for army companies in Stockholm (1857–1860) and Christiania (1862). He was hired at Rikshospitalet in 1863; from 1867 to 1870 he was a research fellow at the university (including thirteen months in the United States). He was a professor at the university and chief physician at Rikshospitalet, until retiring from both posts in 1908. His special field was surgery, but he was also a prominent scholar in dentistry. He was the first in Norway to perform ovarectomy (1866), resection in the knee (1881) and resection in the bowel (1885). He also contributed significantly to the introduction of antiseptic, later aseptic methods in surgery.

He chaired the Norwegian Medical Society in 1880, received an honorary degree at the University of Copenhagen in 1879 and was a fellow in the Norwegian Academy of Science and Letters from 1875. He was decorated as a Knight of the Order of St. Olav in 1889; upgraded to Commander in 1897.
