= Karve (ship) =

Ship type

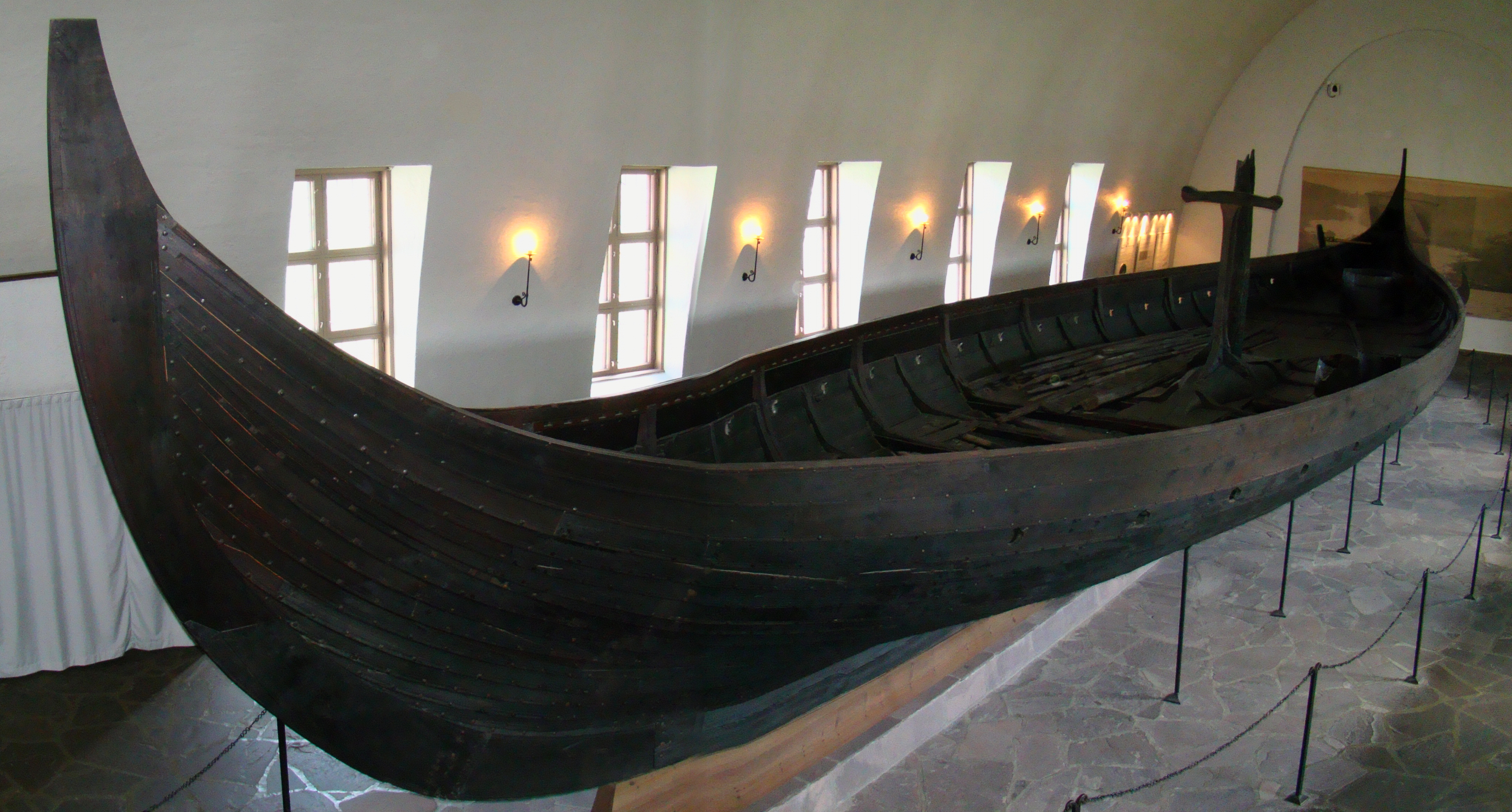
The Gokstad ship, a karve from around 890 AD.

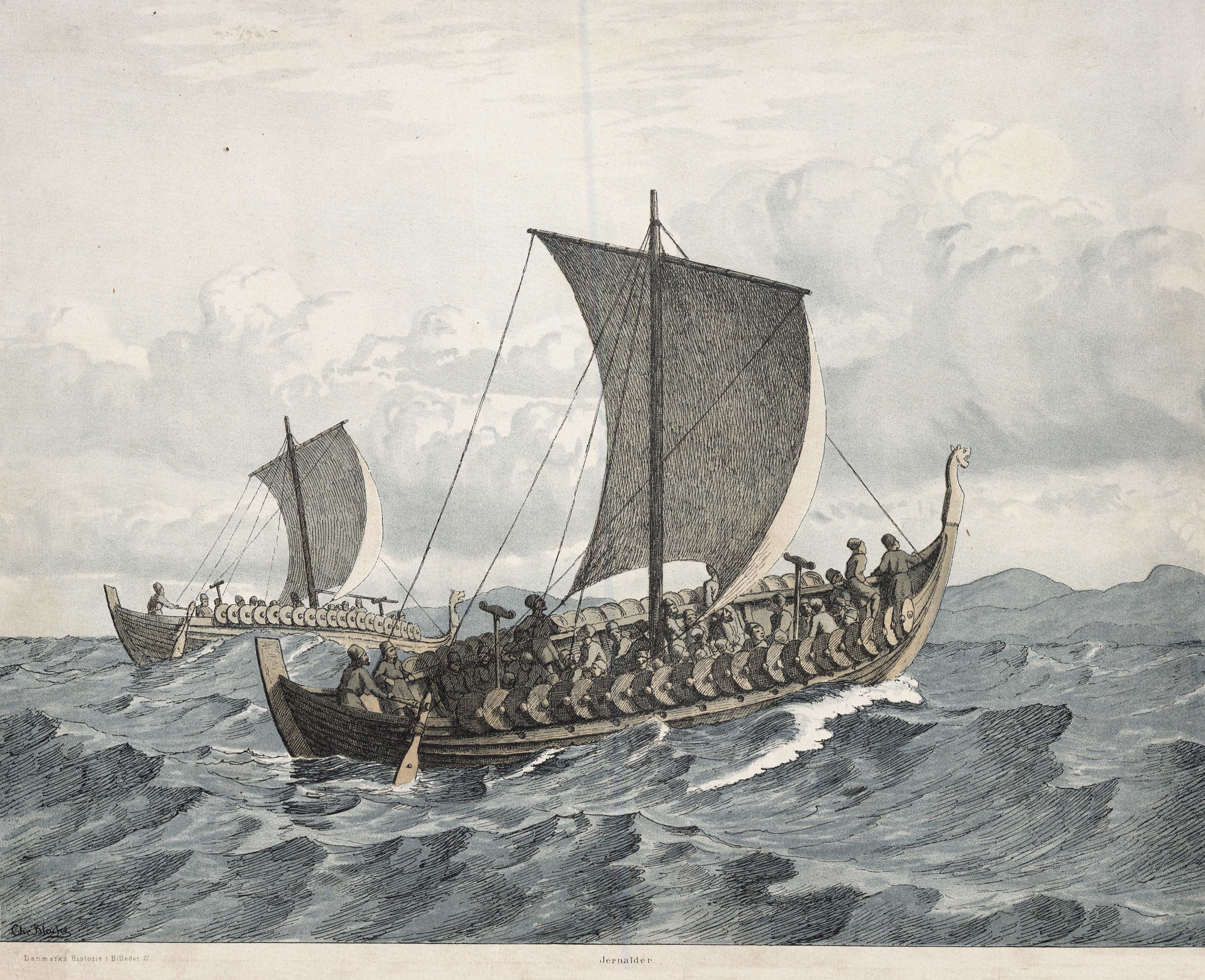
Illustration of two karves equipped for war.

The karve or karvi (Old Norse: karfi; Old Swedish: karve; Old East Slavic: корабль, korablĭ) was a small type of longship with broad hull, somewhat similar to the ocean-going knarr cargo ships. Karves were used for both war and ordinary transport, carrying people, goods or livestock. Because they were able to navigate in very shallow water, they were also used for coasting.

The Gokstad ship is a famous karve ship, built around the end of the 9th century, excavated in 1880 by Nicolay Nicolaysen. It was approximately 23 m (75 feet) long with 16 rowing positions.

== Etymology ==
Old Norse: karfi has been compared to Middle Latin carabus, from Ancient Greek: κάραβος (lit. 'crawfish'), "a type of light ship", of unknown etymology. Compare with caravel (Old Swedish: kravel). Another theory connects the word with the Germanic stem of "carve" (Old English: ceorfan; Old Swedish: kærva).

Other potentially related words include: Finnish: karvas ("small boat"), stemming from a Proto-Finnic form, probably borrowed from Proto-Norse; Old East Slavic: корабль, корабь (korablĭ, korabĭ), used specifically about the Varangian ships during the Viking Age.

== Description ==
Karves had broad beams of approximately 5 m (17 feet), were up to 21 m (70 feet) in length, and allowed for up to 16 oars.

The karve has been described as the smallest vessel that is considered a longship. According to the 10-century Gulating Law, a ship with 13 rowing benches is the smallest ship suitable for military use. A ship with 6 to 16 benches would be classified as a karve. These ships were considered to be "general purpose" ships, mainly used for fishing and trade, but occasionally commissioned for military use. While most longships held a length to width ratio of 7:1, the karve ships were closer to 9:2.

== Historical finds ==
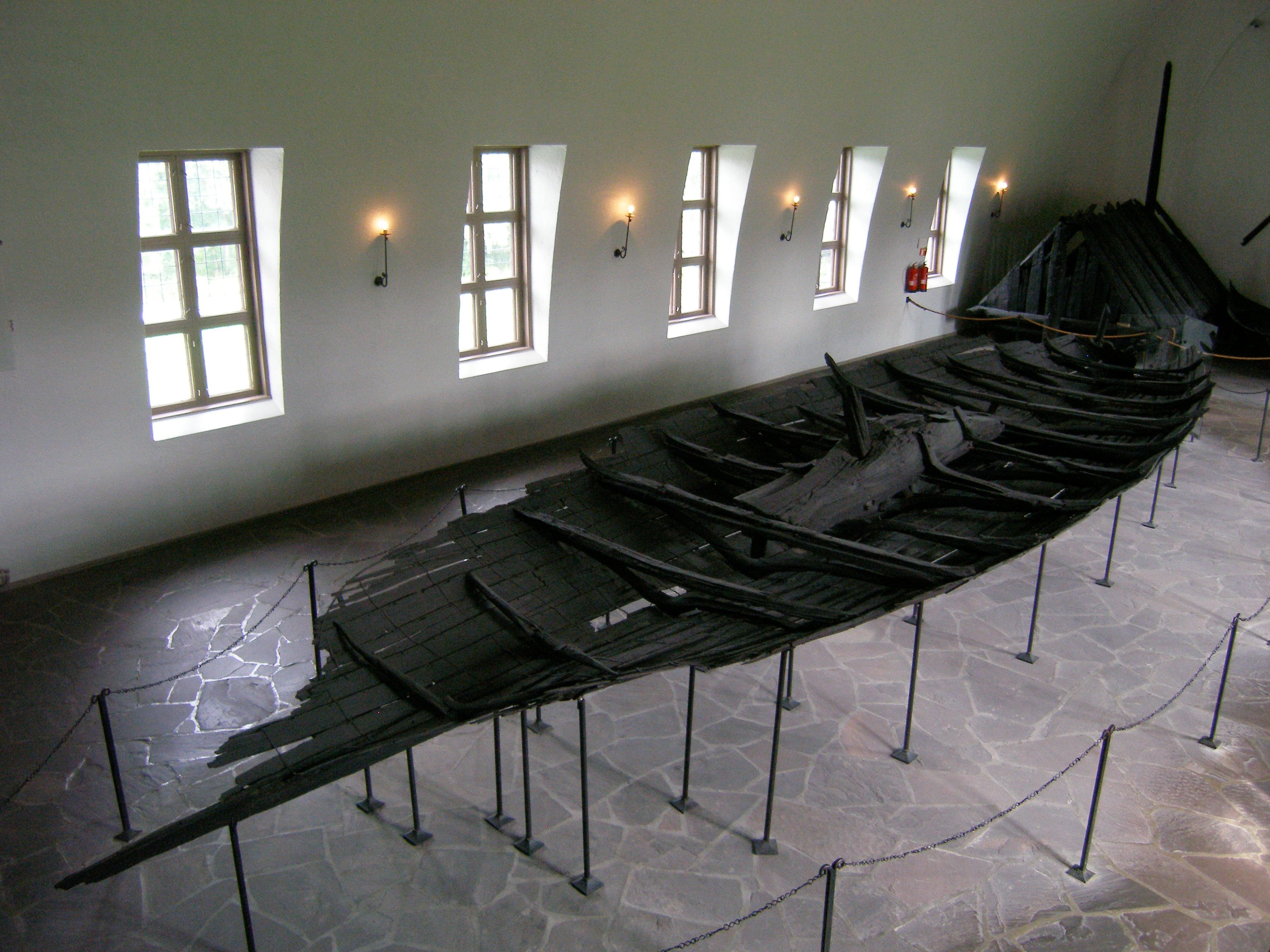
Tune ship at the Viking Ship Museum

The following ship finds have been classified as being karves:

- Gokstad ship (834 AD)
- Tune ship (ca. 900 AD)
