= Gokstad Mound =

Burial mound in Sandefjord, Norway

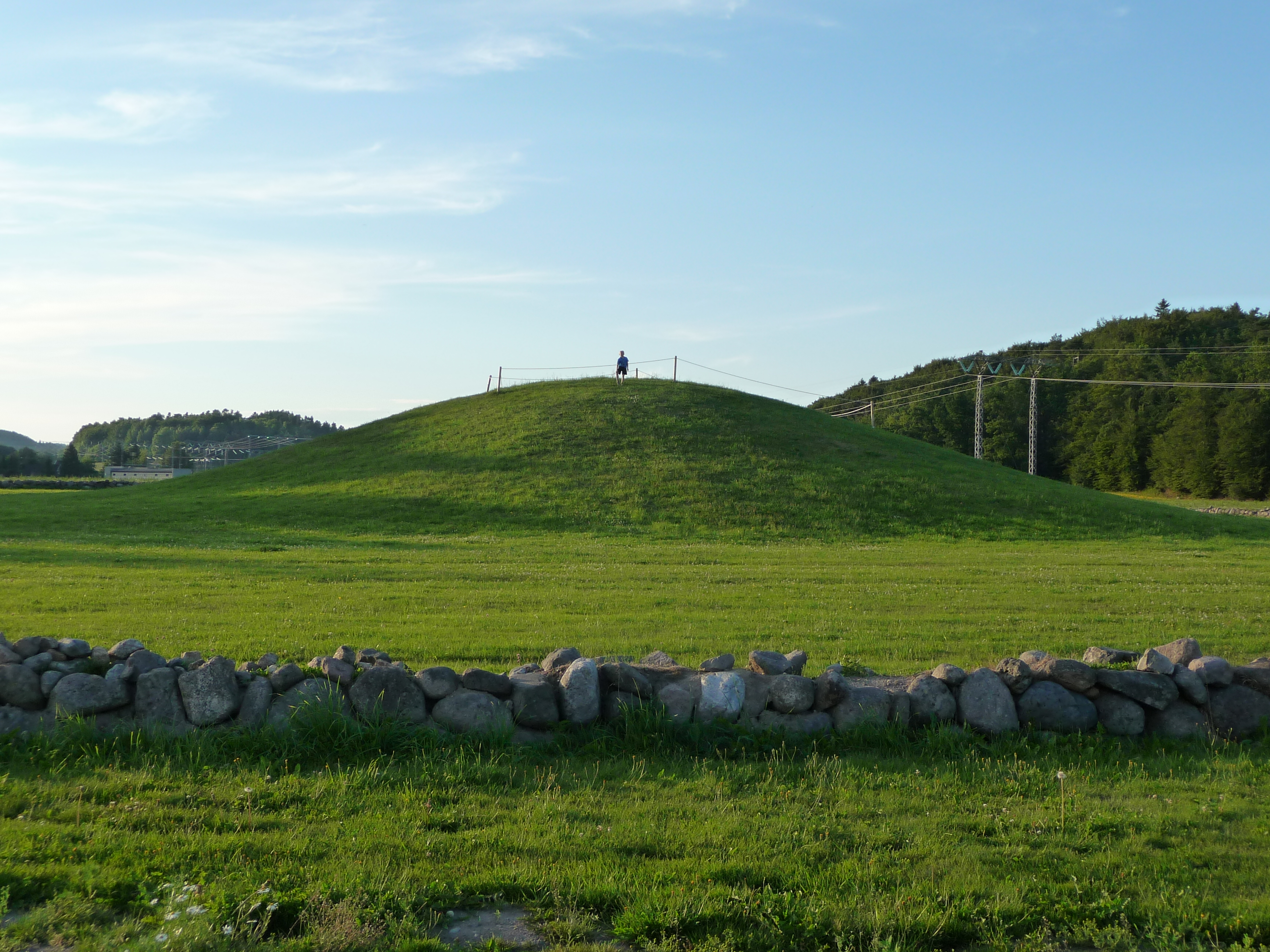
Gokstadhaugen, Sandefjord, Norway (2008)

The Gokstad Mound (Norwegian: Gokstadhaugen) is a large burial mound at Gokstad Farm in Sandefjord Municipality (formerly Sandar Municipality) in Vestfold County, Norway. It is also known as the King's Mound (Kongshaugen) and is where the 9th century Gokstad Ship was found.

== History ==
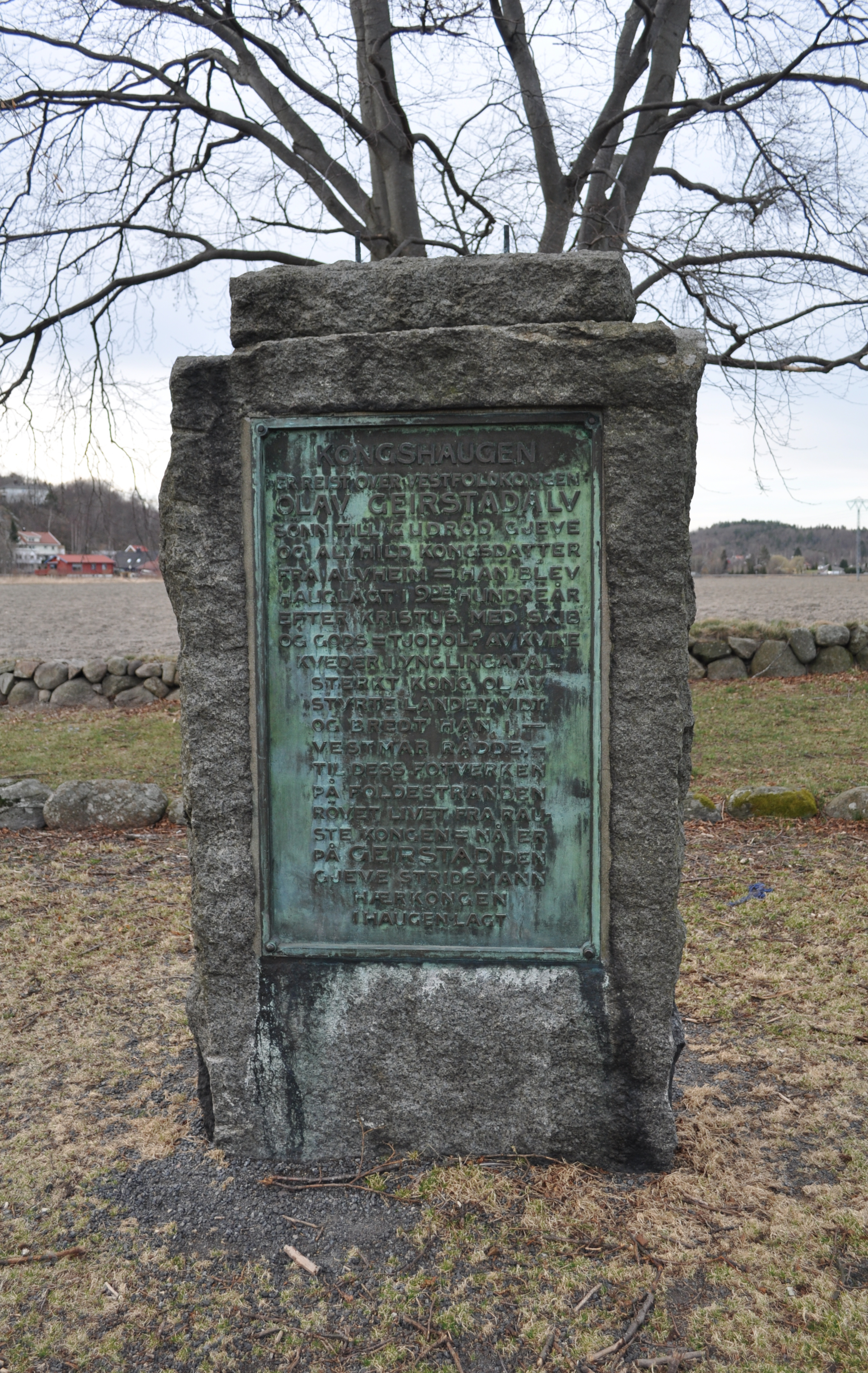
Stone installed during the 1929 opening ceremony.

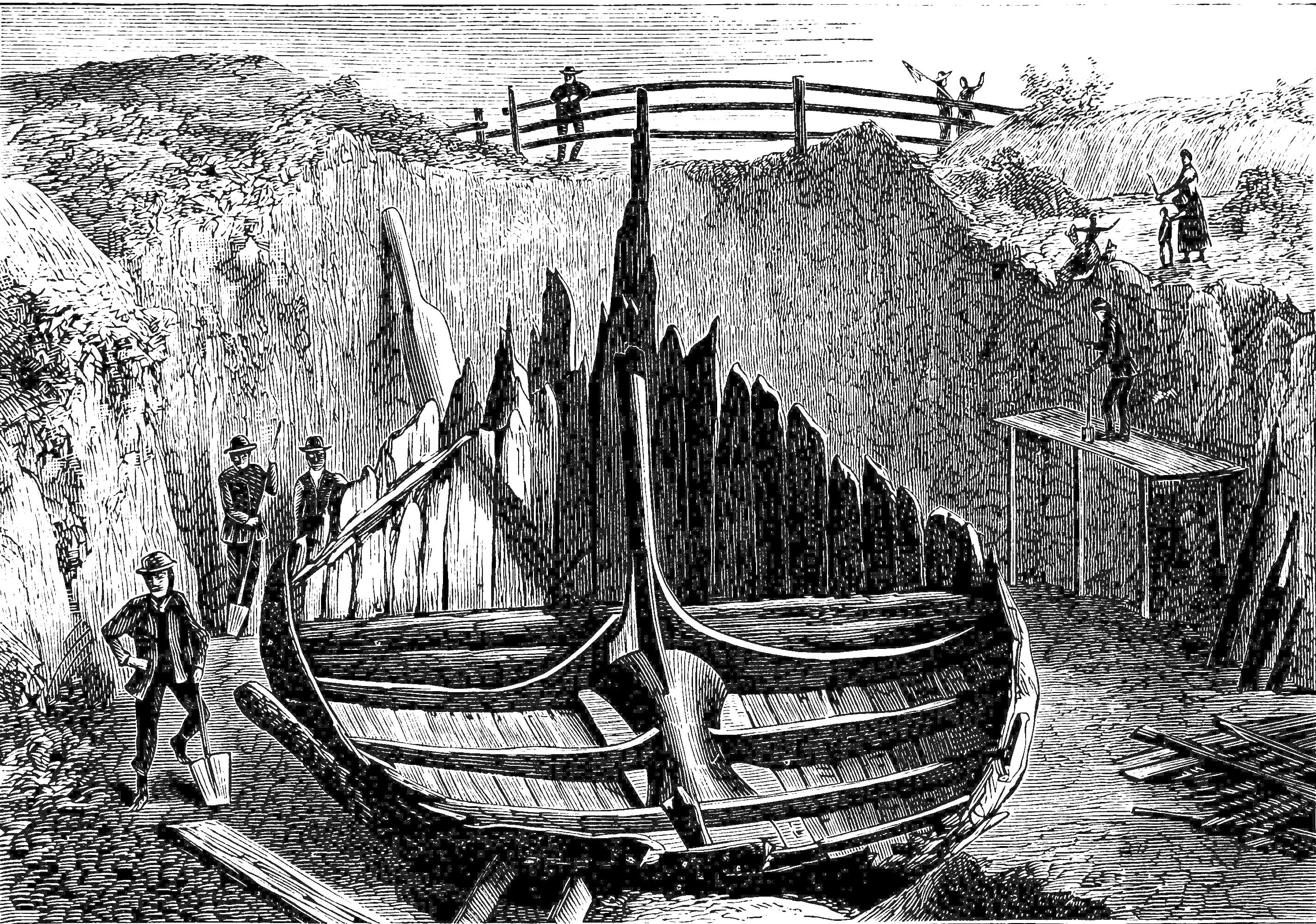
Scandinavian vessel found in Gokstad (Popular Science Monthly, Volume 19, p. 82. 1881)

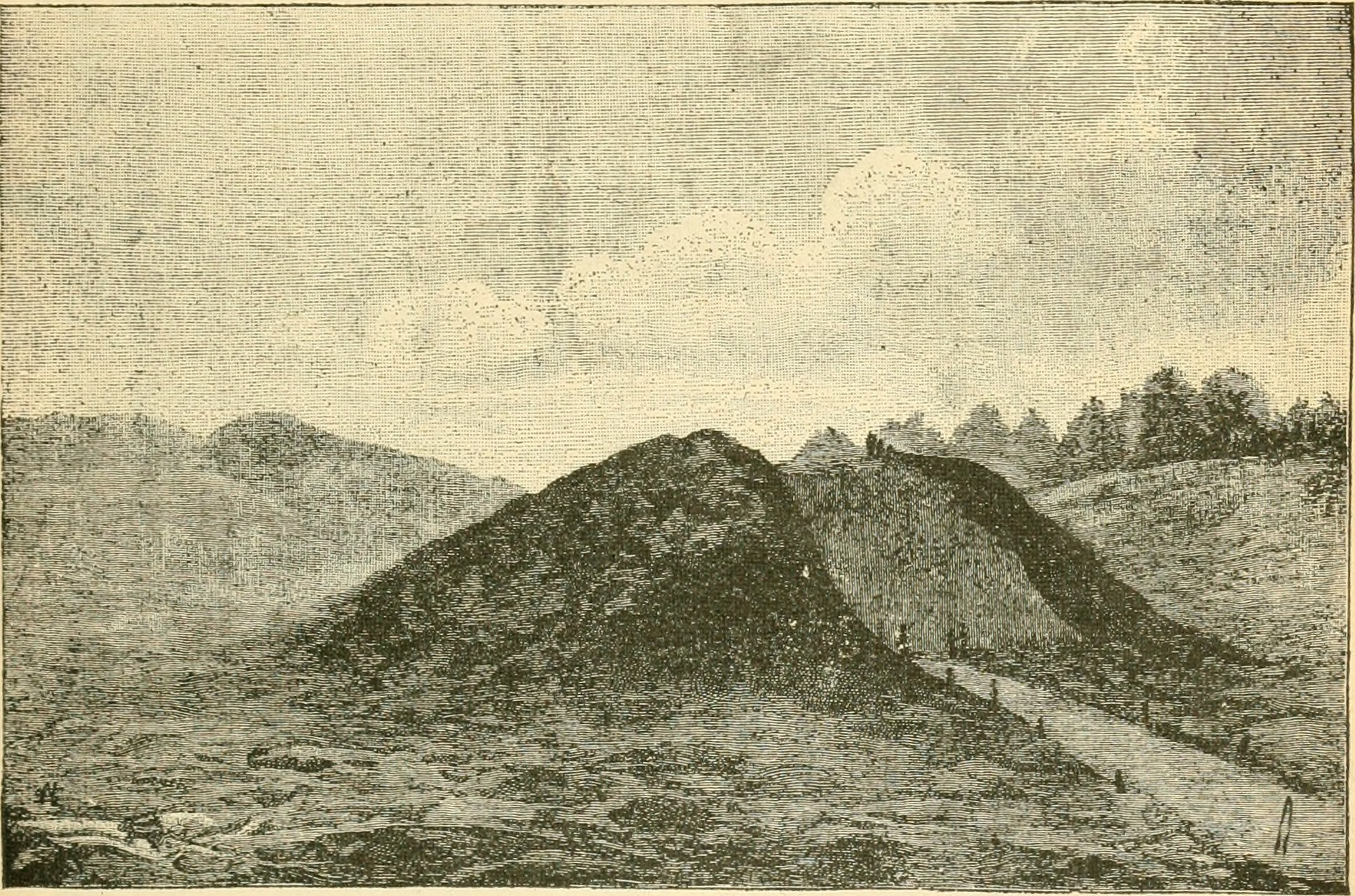
"King's Mound" (Annual report of the Board of Regents of the Smithsonian Institution. 1891)

The mound was excavated by Nicolay Nicolaysen in 1880. The Gokstad Ship was constructed around 890 and was laid in the mound around ten years later. It mainly consists of oak and has a length of 23.8 meters (78 ft.) and width of 5.2 meters (17 ft.). It had 16 pairs of oars and its top speed is estimated as twelve knots. The Gokstad Ship is now located at the Viking Ship Museum in Oslo.

Buried along with the ship was a petty king long believed to have been Olaf Geirstad-Alf, half-brother of Halfdan the Black. However, recent discoveries have increased uncertainty and it, therefore, remains unknown what chieftain was buried at the mound.

After two years of restoration work, Kongshaugen was dedicated in July 1929. A small stone fence was raised around the mound and birch trees were planted along the fence. On the official opening ceremony on July 20, 1929, between 2,000 and 3,000 spectators showed up to observe the ceremony. King Haakon VII was also present, along with Norway's Minister of Church Affairs, the Norwegian Directorate for Cultural Heritage, the mayors of Vestfold County, and others. King Haakon VII also held a speech during the official opening ceremony, which took place on July 28, 1929.

Gokstadhaugen has been described as one of Norway's finest archeological finds. The government of Norway applied to UNESCO in January 2014 to make the Gokstad Mound a World Heritage Site.

== Excavation ==
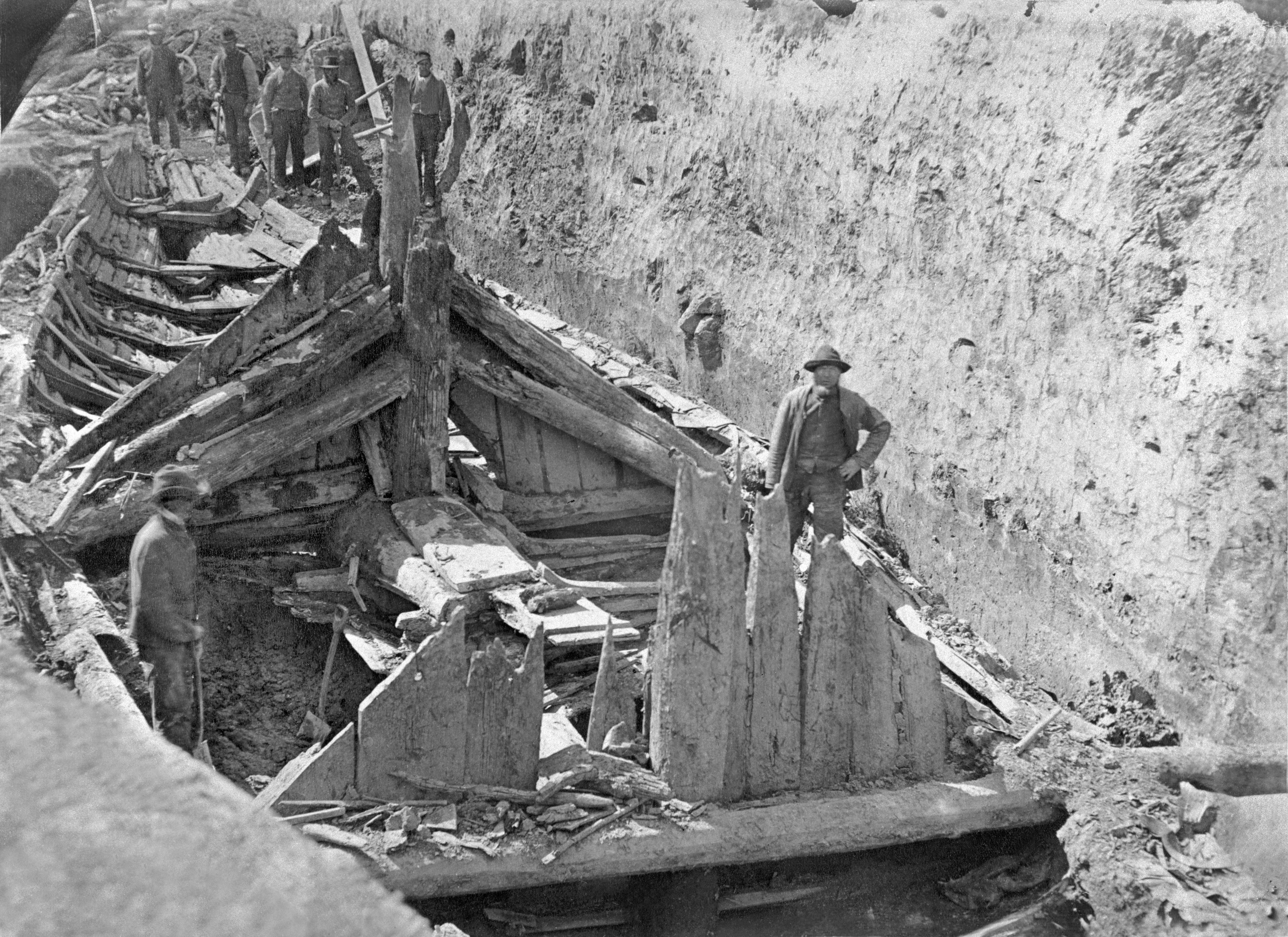
From the archaeological excavations in 1880.

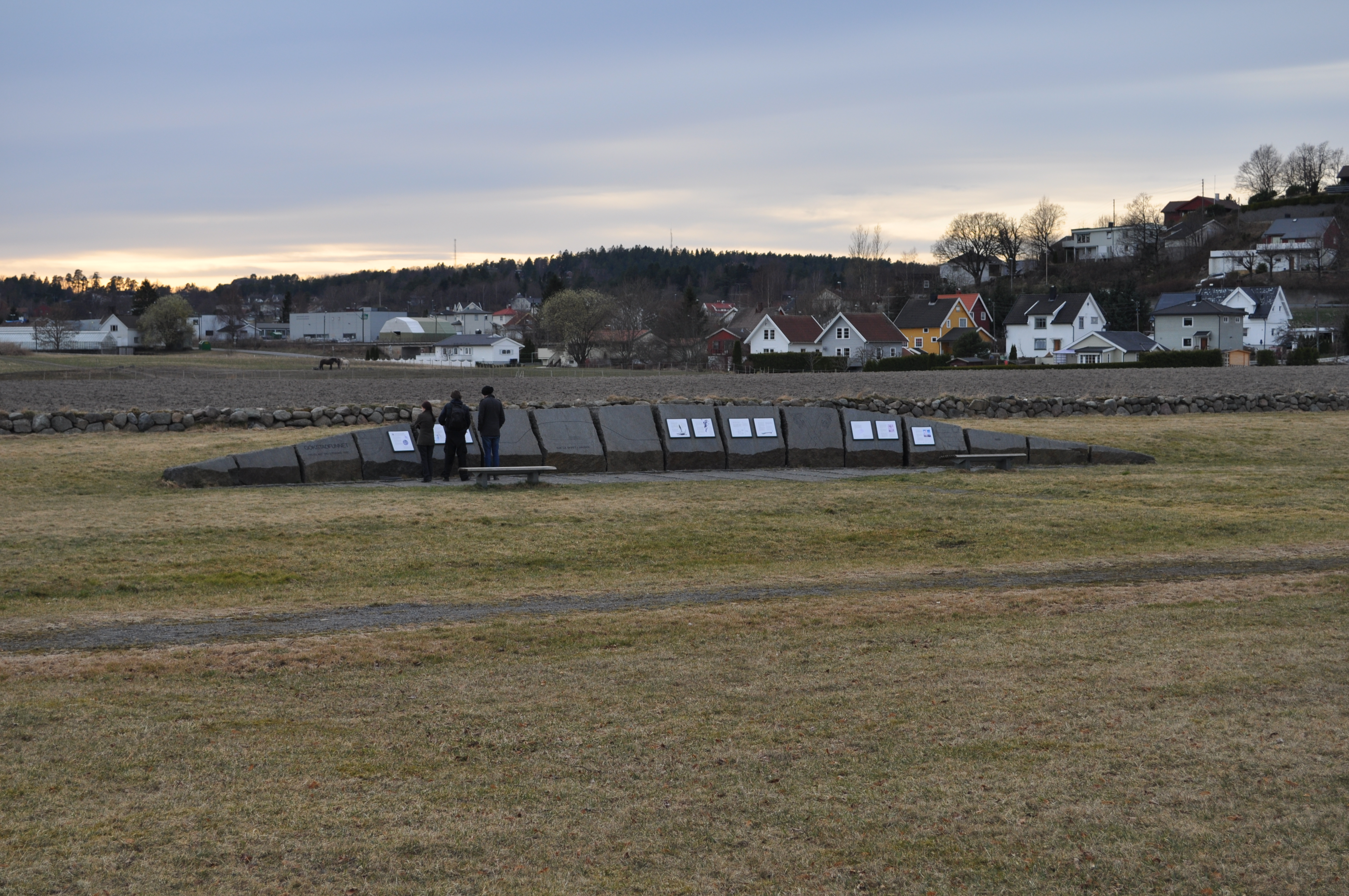
The bilingual interpretive sign measures 23.5 meters, symbolizing the Gokstad Ship's length.

The mound was in 1880 measured as 50 meters (164 ft.) in diameter, with a height of 5 meters (16.4 ft.). The ocean water levels were significantly higher during the Viking Age, when the ocean stood nearly 4 meters (13 ft.) higher than today. It is therefore estimated that the ship was buried near the sea.

Artifacts found in the grave include a gaming board with counters of horn, fishing hooks, harness fittings (made of lead, iron and gilded bronze), 64 shields, kitchen utensils, six beds, a sleigh, as well as three smaller boats. Also found in the grave were two peacocks, two goshawks, eight dogs and twelve horses.

The burial chamber was covered by layers of birch bark, and remnants of silk interwoven with gold thread have been discovered by archeologists stuck between the logs in the roof. These are possibly the remnants of a lavish woven tapestry that decorated inside walls.

Dendrochronological studies prove the ship was constructed between years 885–892 AD. The burial chamber is dated to 895–903 AD.

The buried chieftain was estimated to be 181–183 cm tall (5'9"–6'0"), and was killed around age 40 during a battle.

The ship was discovered in 1879, and was excavated by Nicolay Nicolaysen between April–June 1880. The mound was closed and the chieftain's knuckles were returned to the grave site on June 16, 1928. The knuckles were put in a sarcophagus, and King Haakon VII was present at the official opening of the restored mound on July 29, 1929. The sarcophagus was brought out of the grave by archeologists in 2007, and is currently kept at the University of Oslo (UiO).

== See also ==
- Gaia ship
- Gokstad ship

== Other sources ==
- Nicolaysen, Nicolay (1882) Langskibet Fra Gokstad Ved Sandefjord (Kristiania: Cammermeyer)
