= Knut Kloster =

Norwegian businessman (1929–2020)

Knut Utstein Kloster
- Born: Ulstein Kloster; 2 April 1929; Oslo, Norway
- Died: 20 September 2020 (aged 91)
- Occupation: Shipping magnate
- Known for: Founding Norwegian Caribbean Line with Ted Arison
- Spouse: Trine Kloster

Knut Utstein Kloster (2 April 1929 – 20 September 2020) was a Norwegian shipping magnate. His grandfather, Lauritz Kloster, founded Kloster Rederi in 1924. In 1959, Kloster joined the family business and transformed it into a leading cruise line. Together with Ted Arison, he founded Norwegian Caribbean Line in 1966. The idea for MS The World originated with him.

== See also ==
- MS The World
