= Nicolay Nicolaysen =

Norwegian archaeologist and antiquarian (1817–1911)

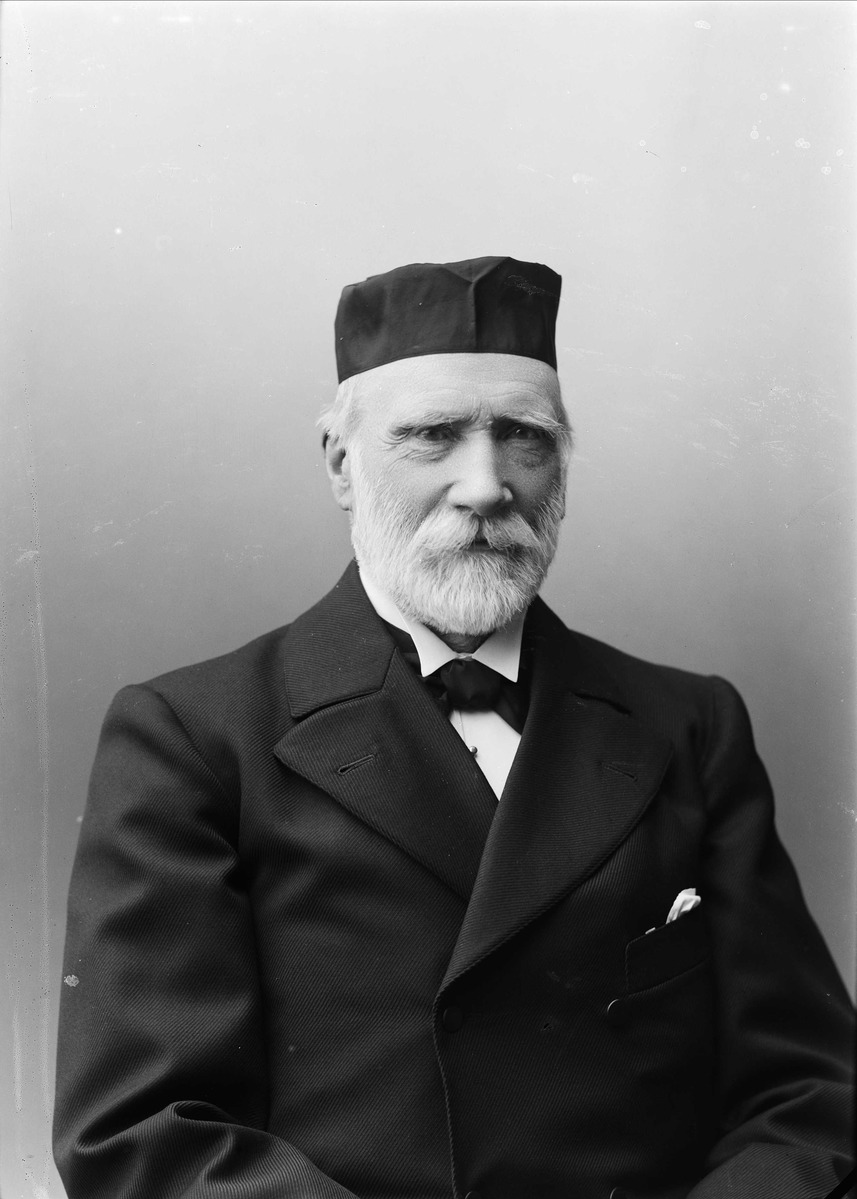
- Nicolay Nicolaysen
- Born: 14 January 1817; Bergen, Norway
- Died: 22 January 1911 (aged 94); Oslo, Norway
- Education: University of Oslo
- Scientific career
- Fields: Archaeology

Nicolay Nicolaysen (14 January 1817 - 22 January 1911) was a Norwegian archaeologist and Norway's first state employed antiquarian. He is perhaps best known for his excavations of the ship burial at Gokstad in 1880.

== Biography ==
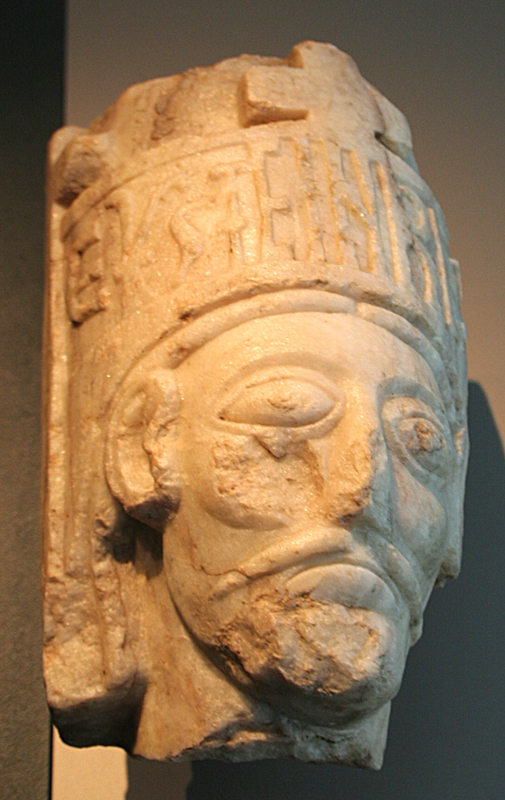
Marble head of Øystein Magnusson Bergen Museum

Nicolay Nicolaysen was born in Bergen to merchant and bank administrator Lyder Wentzel Nicolaysen (1794–1876) and Sophia Susanna Siewers (1797–1826). He was the half-brother of professor of medicine Julius Nicolaysen (1831–1909). Nicolaysen graduated from the University of Christiania now (University of Oslo) and became cand.jur. in 1841. In 1845 he was employed as a copyist in the Ministry of Audit and in 1858 an assistant at the National Archives (Riksarkivet).

In 1851, Nicolay Nicolaysen was a founding member of the Society for the Preservation of Ancient Norwegian Monuments, of which he was president from 1851 to 1899. He also took active part in the restoration of the Nidaros Cathedral in Trondheim and of the Hall of Haakon IV (Håkonshallen) in Bergen. He was active in the founding the National Museum of Art, Architecture and Design (Nasjonalmuseet for kunst, arkitektur og design) and was a proponent of the Norwegian National Academy of Craft and Art Industry.

In 1852, Nicolaysen led the first investigations at the Borre mound cemetery (Borrehaugene) at Horten Municipality, Vestfold. The excavations uncovered an extensive selection of craft work of a stylistic form which has subsequently become known as the Borre style. Many of the artefacts recovered during these excavations are presently on display at the Viking Ship Museum in Oslo.

Nicolaysen also carried out excavations of Munkeliv Abbey located at Nordnes in Bergen in 1857 and 1860. Here, well-crafted structural fragments were recovered. These can be found on display in the Museum of Cultural History (Kulturhistorisk Museum), part of Bergen Museum, and include a marble head of 12th-century Norwegian monarch Øystein Magnusson.

The first excavations of the Kaupang area were undertaken in 1867. Nicolaysen mapped one of the mound cemeteries around the former town, and he excavated 79 burial mounds. He did not, however, investigate the urban settlement associated with the cemeteries. Later excavations indicate that Kaupang was one of the first urban settlements of some significance in Norway.

Nicolay Nicolaysen is perhaps most famous for excavating the Gokstad ship burial (Gokstadfunnet) at Gokstad farm in Sandeherred Municipality near Sandefjord in Vestfold in 1880. Currently the Gokstad ship (Gokstadskipet), together with a burial chamber, two small boats and two tent boards from the burial chamber are displayed in the Viking Ship Museum in Oslo.

== Personal life ==
In 1861, he married Anne Thue Christie (1831–1928). They were the parents of physician Lyder Wentzel Christie Nicolaysen (1866–1927). Nicolay Nicolaysen died during 1911 at Kristiania (now Oslo), Norway.

== Selected works ==
- Kunst og Haandverk fra Norges Fortid, Foreningen til norske (Fortidsmindesmærkers Bevaring, Kristiania 1881–1890)
- Mindesmærker af Middelalderens Kunst i Norge (1853–55)
- Norske Magasin. Skrifter og Optegnelser, angaaende Norge og forfattede efter Reformationen (1858–70)
- Norske Stiftelser. Samling af Fundatser, Testamenter og Gavebreve, samt historisk-statistiske Efterretninger vedkommende milde Stiftelser i Kongeriget Norge (1858–94)
- Absalon Pederssøn. Liber Capituli Bergensis (1860)
- Norske Bygninger fra Fortiden (1860–80)
- Norske Fornlevninger (1862–66)
- Om Throndhjems Domkirke (1872)
- Bergens Borgerbog 1550–1751 (1878)
- Om den gamle Bygningsskik i Solør og Østerdalen, i Folkevennen (1881)
- Nicolaysen, Nicolay (1882). "Udgravninger i Løiten 1881". Aarsberetning for 1881 (in Norwegian). Foreningen til Norske Fortidsmindesmerkers Bevaring: 68–80.
- Langskibet fra Gokstad ved Sandefjord (1882)
- Om Relikviegjemmer i norske Kirker (1888)
- Stavanger Domkirke og de nærmest omliggende Bygninger (1896)

== Other sources ==
- Lidén, Hans-Emil (2005) Nicolay Nicolaysen, Et blad av norsk kulturminneverns historie (Oslo: Abstrakt forlag) ISBN 82-7935-187-6
