= Öland Zoo and Amusement Park =

Coordinates: 56.6706°N 16.4903°E

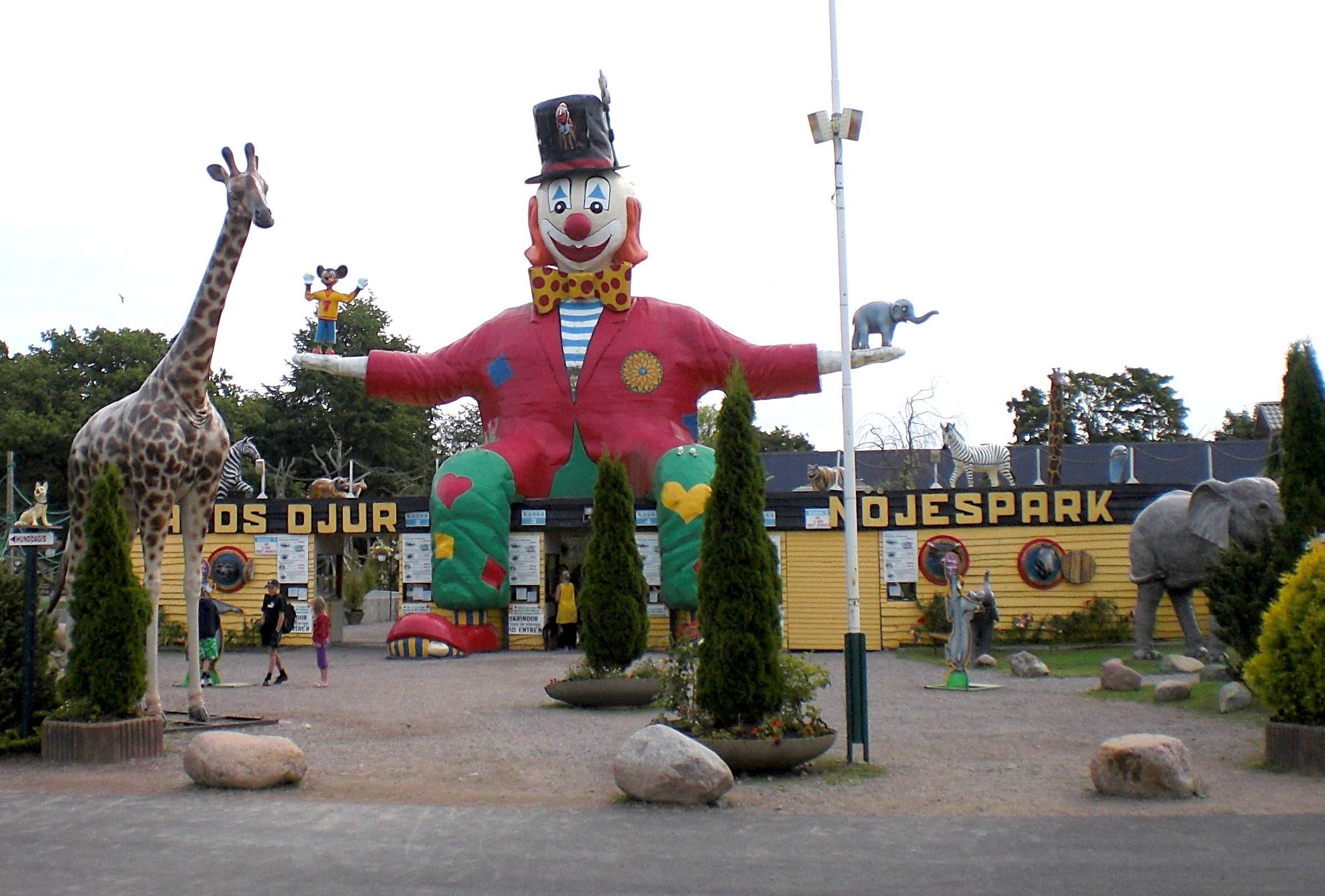
- Entrance
- Interactive map of Öland Zoo and Amusement Park
- Date opened: 1974
- Location: Färjestaden, Öland, Sweden
- Land area: 30.000 m²
- No. of species: 100
- Memberships: EEP, EAZA
- Owner: Barbro Hägg
- Website: http://www.olandsdjurpark.com

The Öland Zoo and Amusement Park (Swedish: Ölands djur- och nöjespark) is a zoo and an amusement park one kilometer north of Färjestaden in Sweden.

Short after the Öland Bridge was inaugurated on 30 September 1972, the founder of the zoo, Boris Bravin bought an old farm close to the bridge where he, assisted by the architect Sören Rasmussen established a zoo.

In the year 2000 the ownership of the park was transferred from Boris Bravin to Barbro Hägg and her son Richard Berglunds company Nöjesfältet Caravellen AB
