= Eriksöre =

Village in Öland, Sweden

Coordinates: 56.60796°N 16.47809°E

Eriksöre is a village located on the island of Öland, Sweden. It is also part of the annual harvest festival on the island.

The village is located about 3 miles (5 km) away from the next town, Färjestaden, right at the foot of Ölandsbron. The major street, on which Eriksöre lies, is about 300 metres (980 ft) long.

== Population ==
The population of Eriksöre is approximately 20 permanent residents, with a few more having weekend cabins there. The population of Eriksöre mainly provide for themselves through farming or artwork.

== Markets ==
Once a year in Öland, there is an arrangement called "Skördefesten" throughout the island, where farmers sell their vegetables. This is arranged in Eriksöre, where the village's farmers and artists sell their products presented in a pleasant manner.

The island's largest shopping mall is located in Färjestaden. The shopping mall contains a large grocery store, some clothes shops and a few other various stores. For further shopping, many villagers go to the next big town, Kalmar, located around 10 miles (16 km) from Eriksöre.
