= Södermanland Runic Inscription 333 =

Coordinates: 59.27376°N 17.13199°E

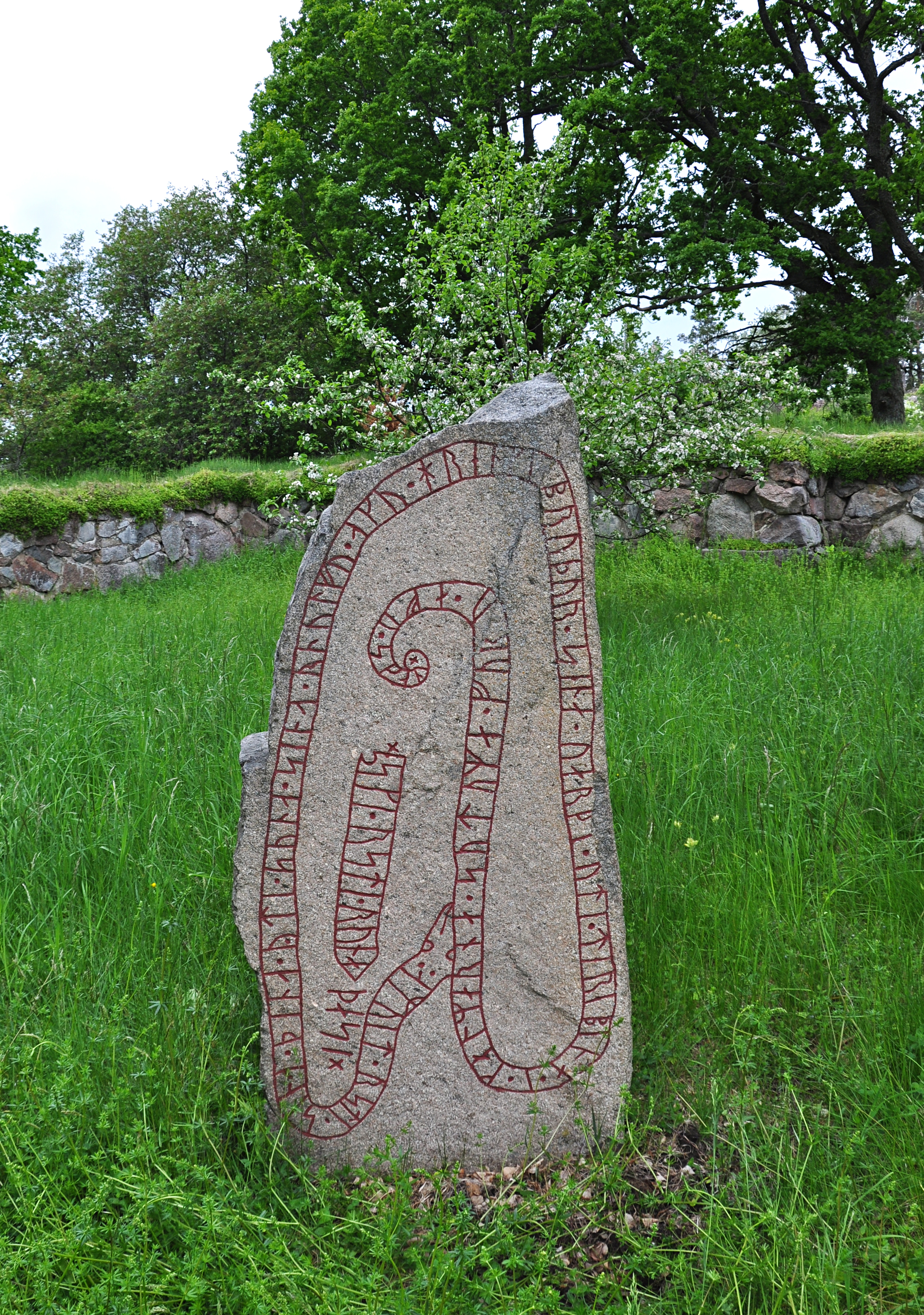
Sö 333

The Södermanland Runic Inscription 333 is a Viking Age runestone engraved in Old Norse with the Younger Futhark runic alphabet. It is located at the abandoned Ärja Church in Strängnäs Municipality. The style of the runestone is a categorized as Fp.

== Inscription ==
: amuit · rsti · sina · þina · yti · suna · sina · rnulfu/unulfu · aku · hrenki bruþur · sena · uarþi · uti · terebina · i · kalmarna · sutuma · furu · afu · skani ×× eski · rsti · runa · þasi ×
{} Amundi(?) {} ræisti {} stæin {} þenna {} æftiʀ {} sun {} sinn {} Runulf/Unnulf {} ok {} Hring(?), broður {} sinn. {} Varð {} uti {} drepinn {} i {} Kalmarna {} sundum, {} foru {} af {} Skanøy. {} Æskell/Æsgæiʀʀ {} risti {} runaʀ {} þaʀsi. {}
"Ámundi(?) raised this stone in memory of his son Rúnulfr/Unnulfr, and Hringr(?), his brother. (He) was killed out in the Kalmarnir sound, (as they) travelled from Scania. Áskell/Ásgeirr carved these runes."
