= Borgholm Church =

Coordinates: 56.8803°N 16.6562°E

- Borgholms kyrka
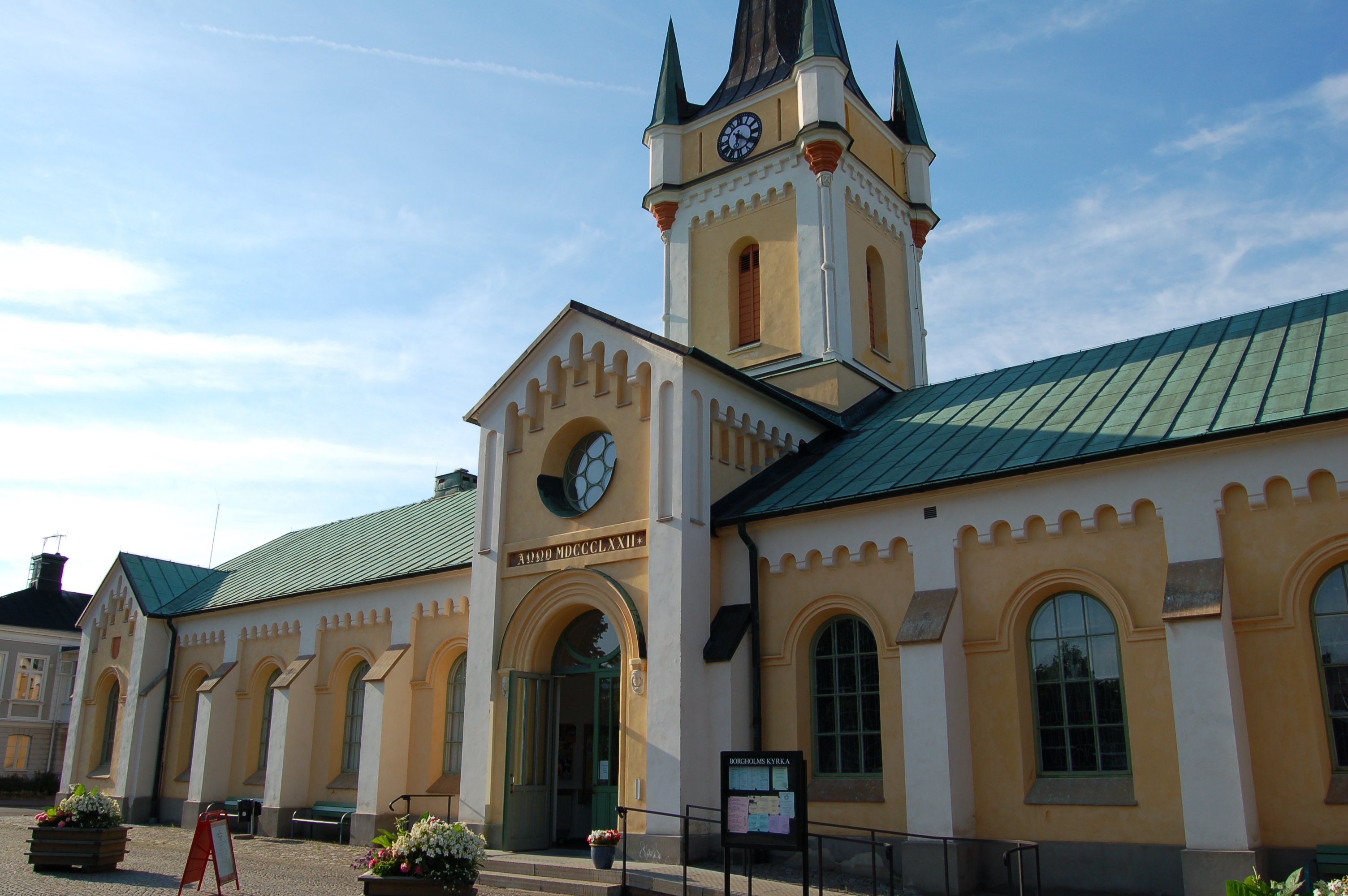
- Borgholm Church
- Borgholm Church
- Location: Borgholm
- Country: Sweden
- Denomination: Church of Sweden

History
- Consecrated: 1 June 1879

Administration
- Diocese: Växjö
- Parish: Borgholm

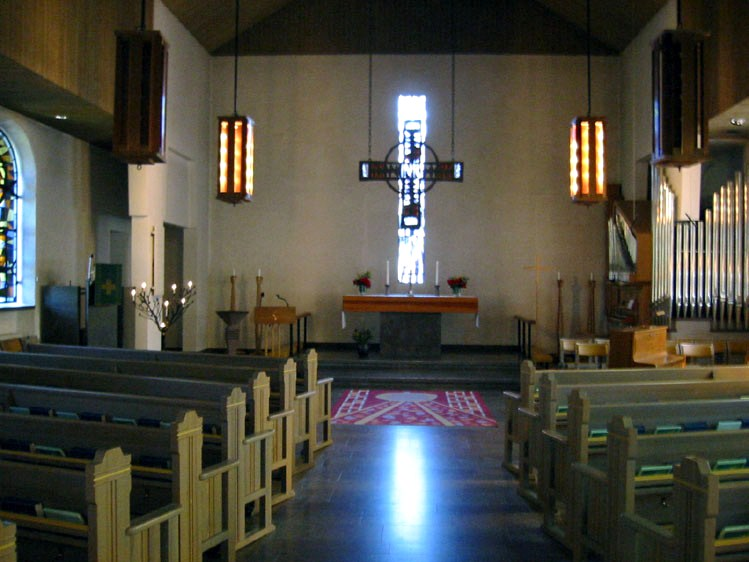
Inside Borgholm Church

Borgholm Church (Swedish: Borgholms kyrka) is a church in Borgholm on the Swedish Baltic Sea island of Öland. Belonging to Borgholm Parish of the Church of Sweden, it opened on Pentecost Sunday, 1879.
