= Borgholm =

- Locality
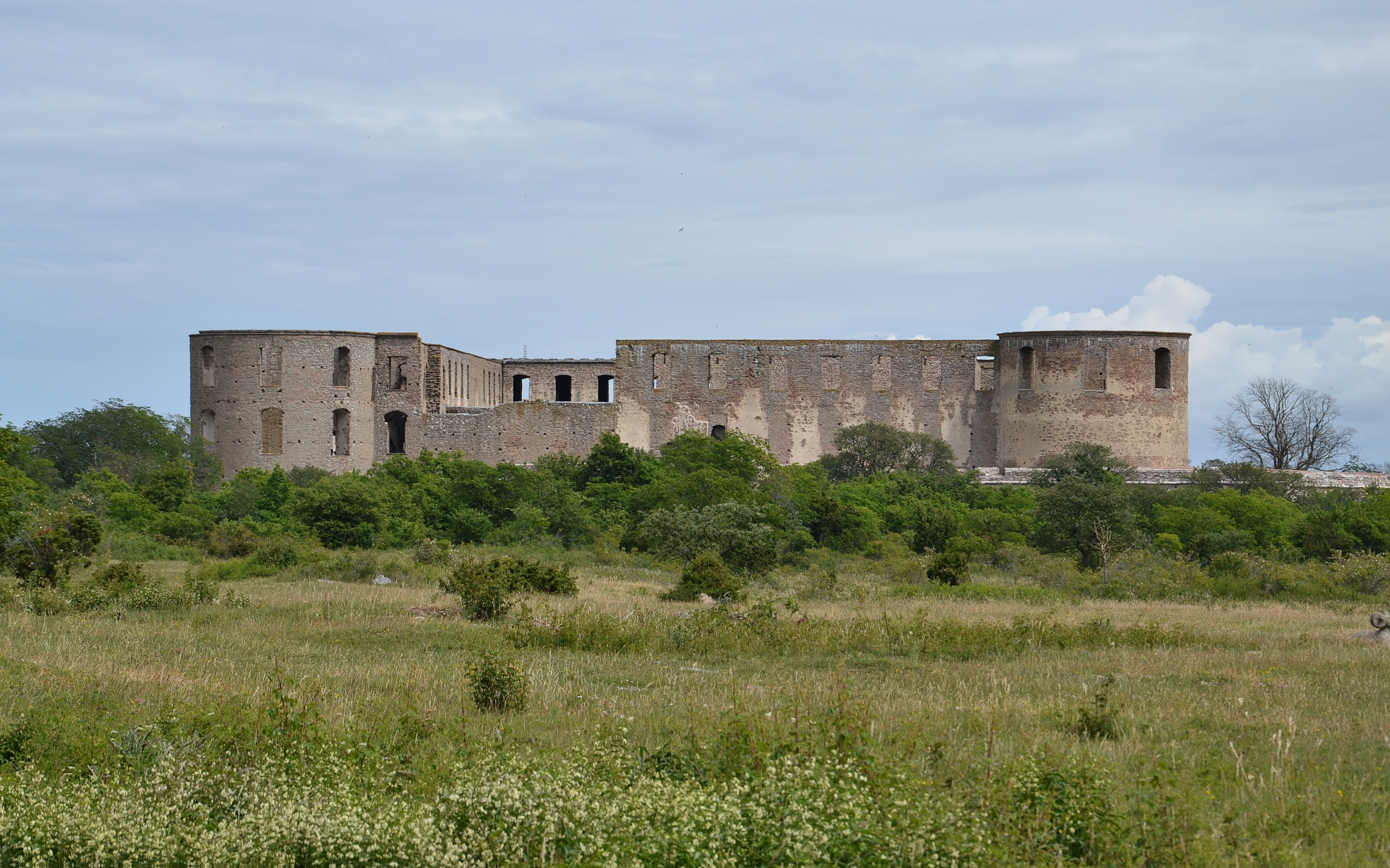
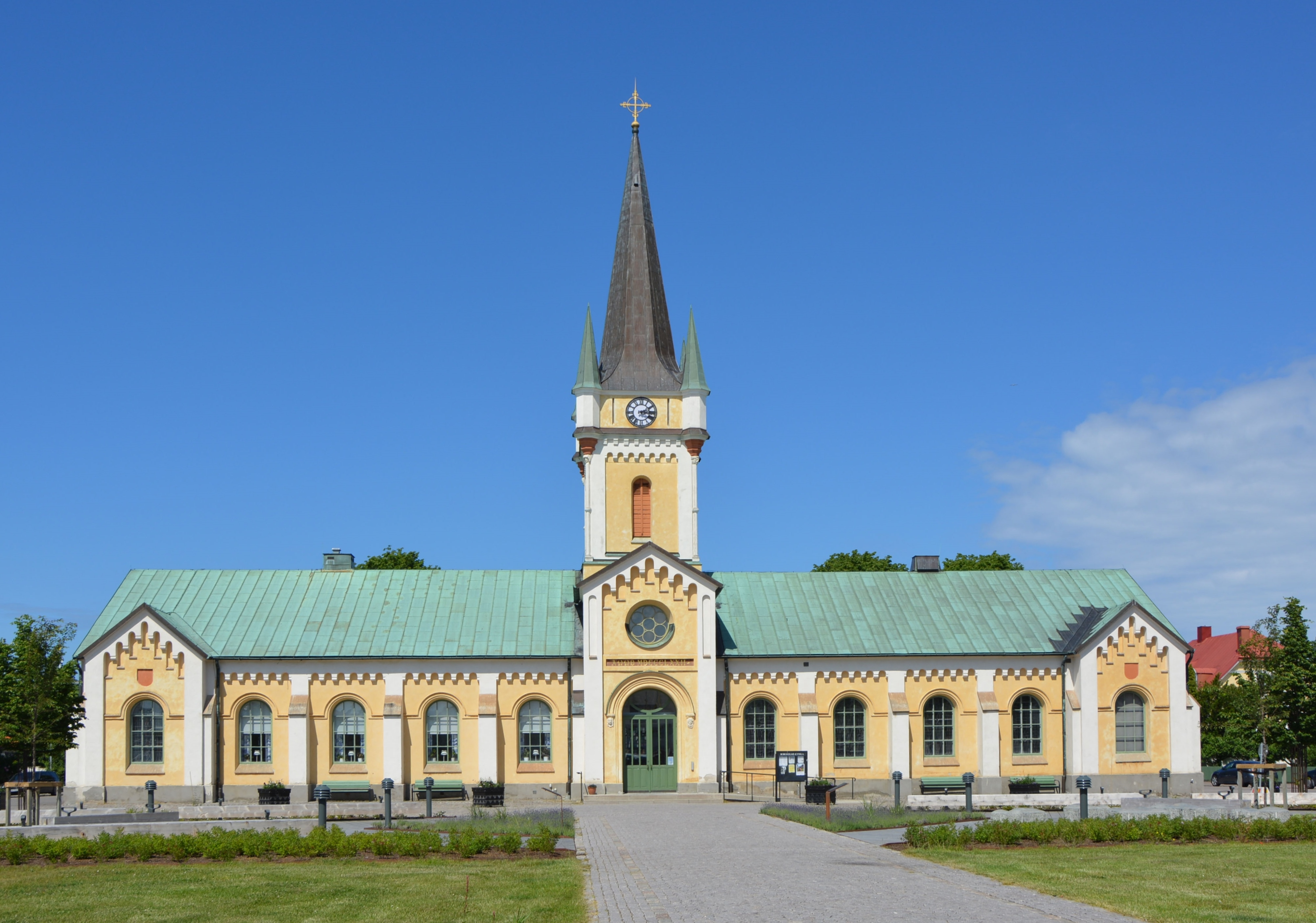
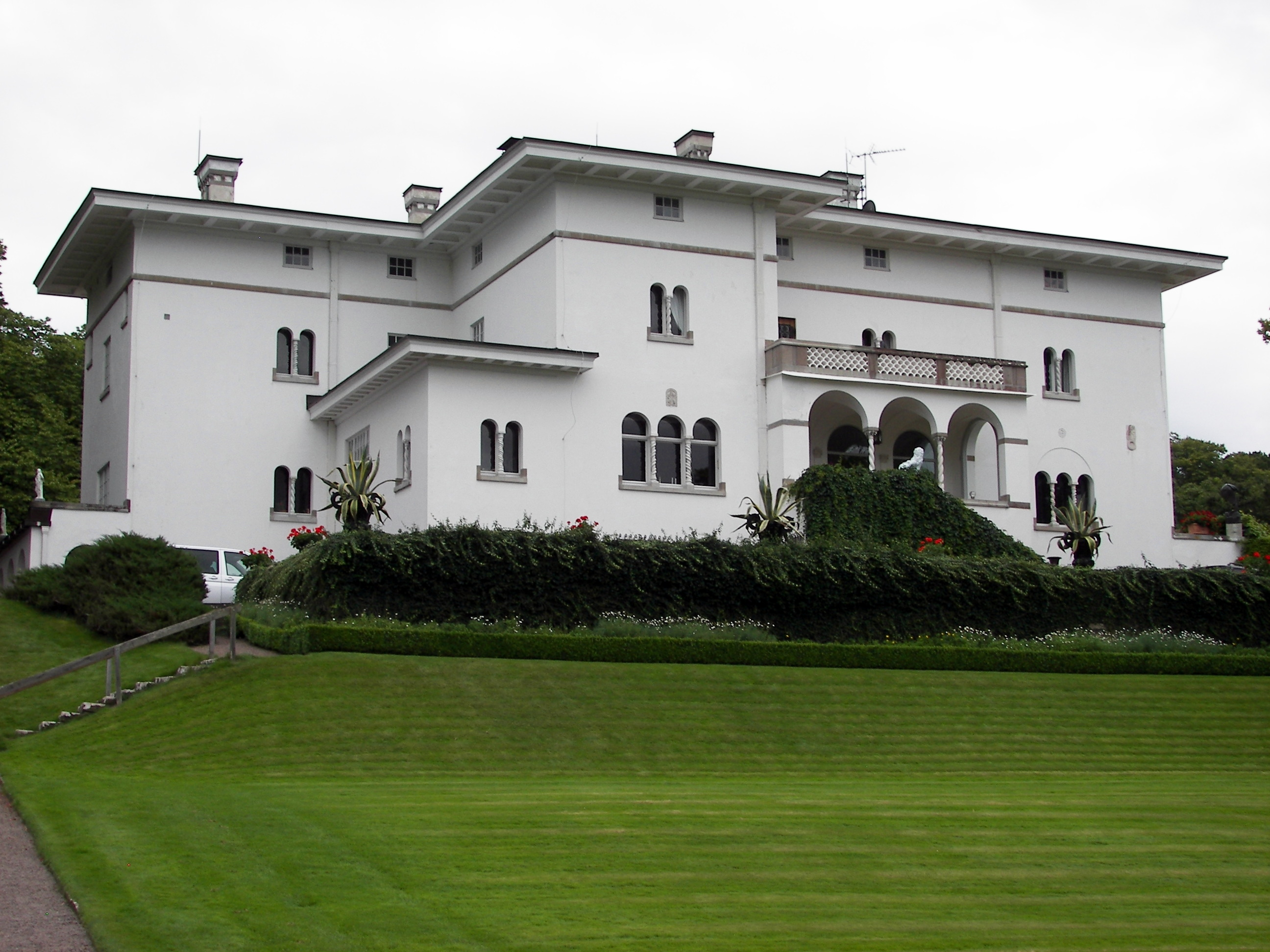
- Borgholm Castle Borgholm Church Solliden Palace

- Location within Kalmar Location within Sweden
- Coordinates: 56°52′45″N 16°39′21″E
- Country: Sweden
- Province: Öland
- County: Kalmar County
- Municipality: Borgholm Municipality
- Founded: 1816

Area
  - Total: 2.56 km^{2} (0.99 sq mi)
- Elevation: 5 m (16 ft)

Population (31 December 2010)
  - Total: 3,071
  - Density: 1,201/km^{2} (3,110/sq mi)
- Time zone: UTC+1 (CET)
  - Summer (DST): UTC+2 (CEST)
- Postal code: 387 xx
- Area code: (+46) 485
- Website: Official website

Borgholm (Swedish: [ˈbɔ̂rjhɔlm]) is a city and the seat of Borgholm Municipality, Kalmar County, Sweden with 4,401 inhabitants in 2020. It is located on the island of Öland in the Baltic Sea, at the Kalmar Strait-side of Öland, north of Färjestaden.

Borgholm is one of Sweden's historical towns with a former city status (stad). The city is best known for its once-magnificent fortress – Borgholm Castle – which is now in ruins. Borgholm is, despite its small population, for historical reasons normally still referred to as a city. Statistics Sweden, however, only counts localities with more than 10,000 inhabitants as cities.

Borgholm is the main city of Öland, but remains one of the smallest cities in Sweden.

== Geography ==
The city is situated some 20 kilometres (12 miles) north of the Öland Bridge, which connects the island with the city of Kalmar on the mainland.

== Etymology ==
The name Borgholm is documented to be found from the 1280s. The foreland Borg- is considered to refer to the old ancient castle which is believed to have been located on the site of the castle ruins, but according to another interpretation refers to the eye-catching topography of the site. The significance would then be that berg- is the correct interpretation, and support for this can be found in Gotlandic, where borg can mean beach hill or high sand dune, and that berg-meaning has been well spread throughout the East Nordic area.

== History ==
The coat of arms of Borgholm

During the Viking Age, there was a marketplace in Köpingsvik dating from the 8th century.

The oldest evidence refers to the medieval castle, which was on the site. The oldest evidence is a letter issued by King Magnus Birgersson at the castle. Borgholm's castle was located in Borg parish, whose parish church was located next to the castle, and the oldest preserved parts date from the beginning of the 12th century. Borgholm's then castle was destroyed in connection with Sören Norby's siege of the castle in 1520 after which Borgholm was transformed into a royal court.

The city received its charter in 1816 and emerged as a spa-town in the shadow of the ruins of the once mighty Borgholm Castle, which burned down in 1806. So important and magnificent was this castle, that it has become the city arms, and the ruins are the best known attraction in the municipality, perhaps on the entire island of Öland. Slightly further south is Halltorps Estate, a historic royal estate linked to Borgholm Castle. Borg parish was most recently dissolved at the beginning of Gustav Vasa's government and merged with Räpplinge. The church was blown up in connection with the Kalmar War. Borgholm, however, continued to function as a fishing village and port for crossings between Öland and the mainland, the port has previously been called Borghamn.

In 1620, Borgehamn gained rights as a Lidköping under the city of Kalmar. During the fortress construction period under Karl X Gustav's government, Borgholm experienced a certain flourishing, but at the time of the issuance of the city privileges for Borgholm, Borgehamn's köping had only about 30 inhabitants, within what became the city area there were then only three farms and four cottages. In 1816, the city of Borgholm was formed, the only city on Öland and a small town seen from a national perspective with only 109 inhabitants in 1821. A new port was built in 1855–1857, and in 1864 Borgholm became a health resort, which meant a certain boost for the city. The air on Öland and especially in Borgholm was considered beneficial, and well-to-do guests flocked in from the rest of Sweden, often by boat. There was a connection between Stockholm, via Borgholm to Hamburg. During this time many beautiful villas and even hotels were built. In 1851 there were 545 inhabitants and in 1901 926 inhabitants.

In 1906 the Borgholm – Böda Railway was opened and in 1910 also the Södra Ölands Järnväg towards Mörbylånga and Ottenby. The railway was closed in 1961. At the turn of the century in 1900, tourism also began to gain momentum, especially after the royal family's residence Solliden was completed. Since the Öland Bridge was inaugurated in 1972, the town has increasingly become a commuter town towards Kalmar.

The city serves as the centre of northern Öland and is one of the most popular summer resorts in Sweden.

Borgholm Castle has its modern counterpart outside Borgholm. The Swedish Royal Family has its official summer residence at Solliden Palace a couple of kilometres outside the city centre. The Crown Princess Victoria's birthday is annually celebrated on July 14 at the Borgholm Sports Field.

== Environs ==
There are small reaches of the Stora Alvaret geological formation in the environs of Borgholm, which level exposures of limestone host a variety of rare species of butterflies and wildflowers, some of which are endemic to Öland.

== Gallery ==
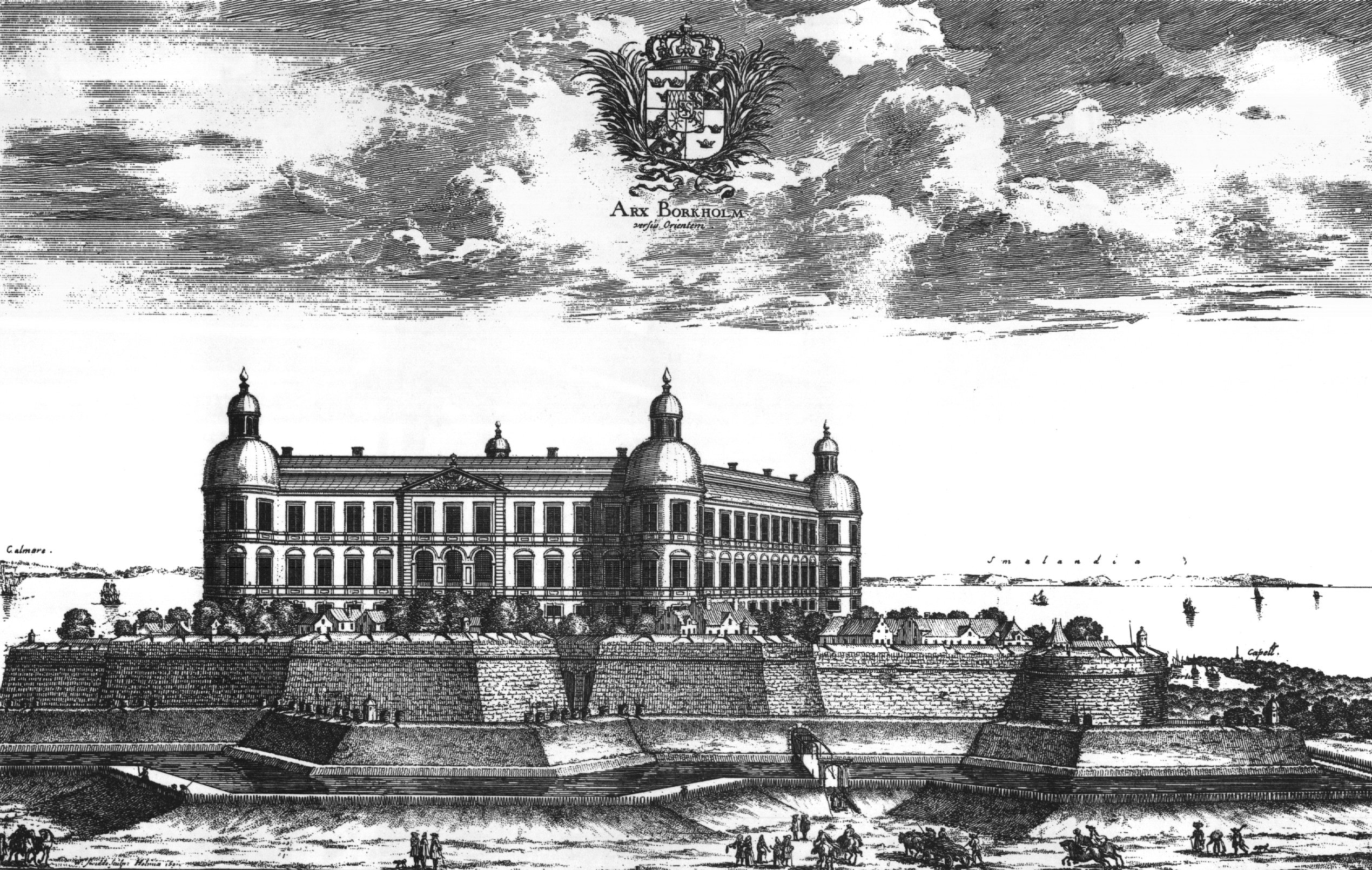
Borgholm Castle in 1691, in Suecia antiqua et hodierna

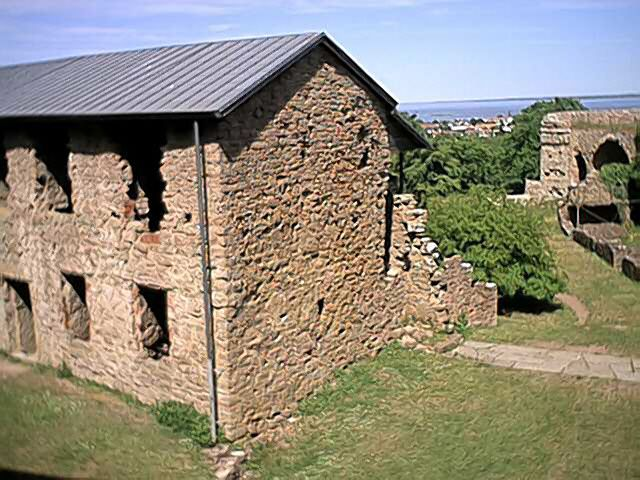
Part of the ruins of today

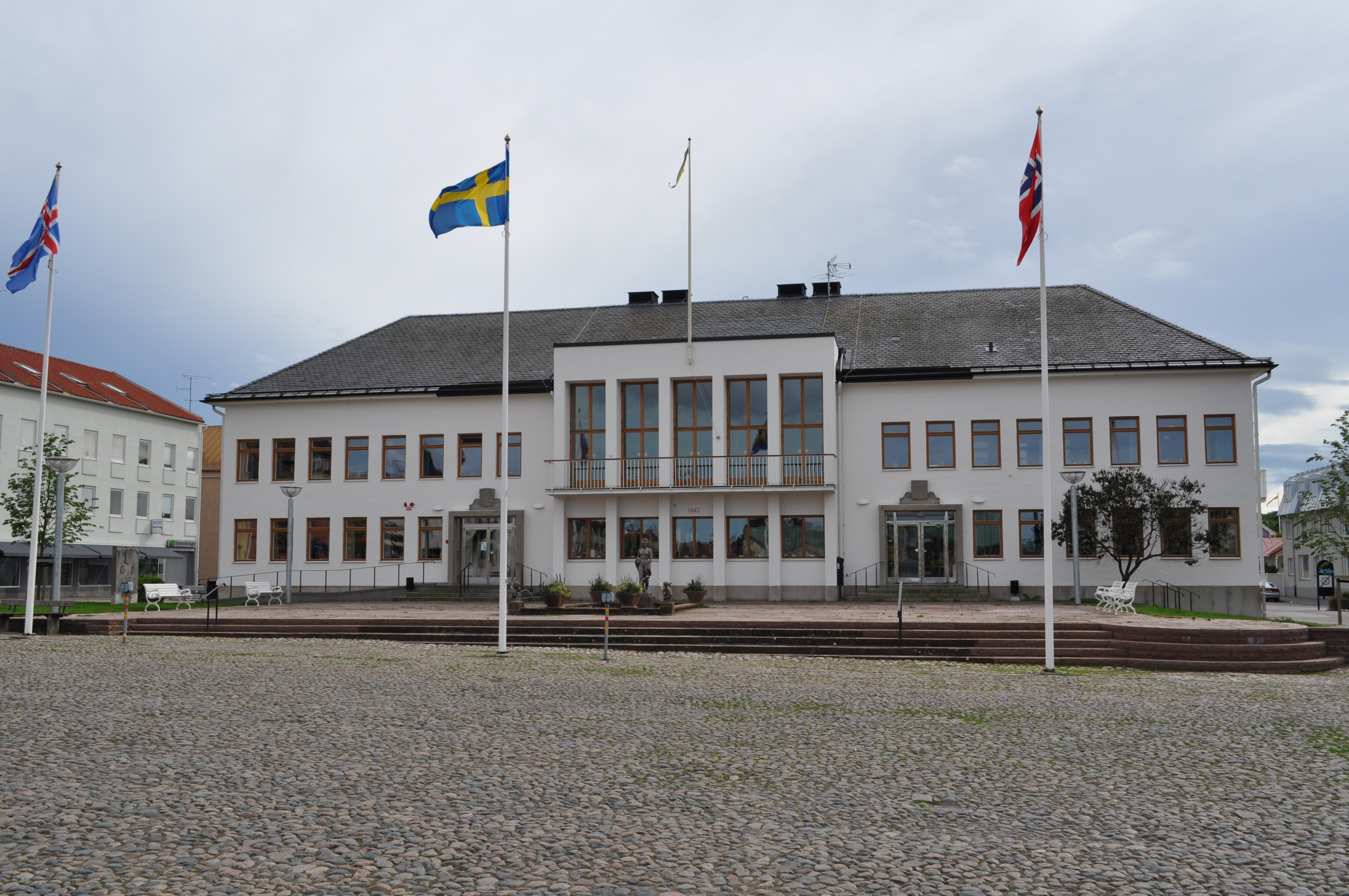
City hall
