= Sandby borg =

Ringfort on Öland, Sweden

Sandby Borg
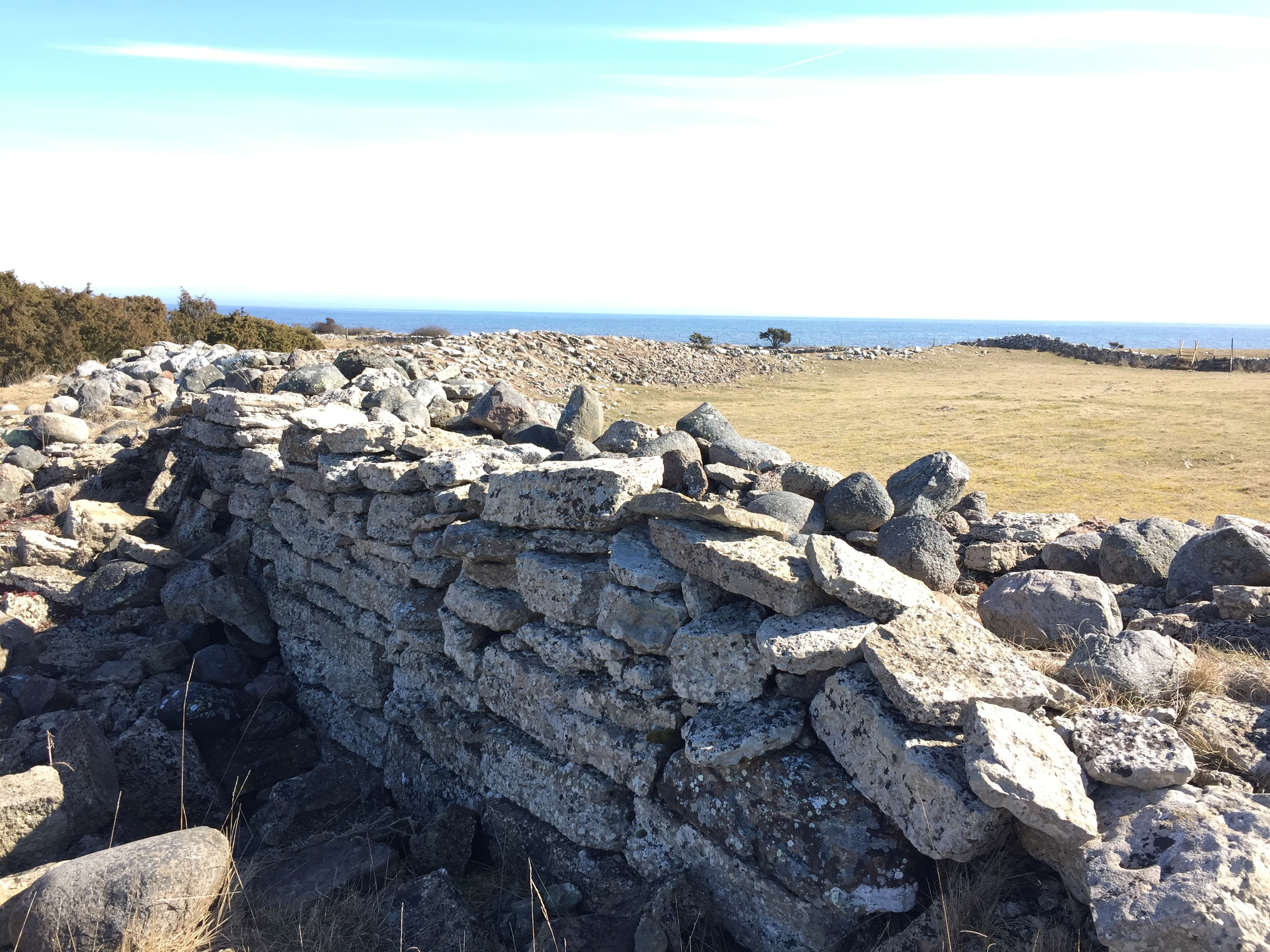
- Part of the west wall of Sandby Borg
- Interactive map of Sandby Borg
- 56°33′09.6″N 16°38′23.2″E
- Type: Ringfort
- Location: Kalmar län, Öland, Sweden

History
- Built: c. 400 A.D.

Site notes
- Excavation dates: 2010-2017, ongoing
- Archaeologists: Dr. Helena Victor, Dr. Ludvig Papmehl-Dufay, Clara Alfsdotter
- Condition: Ruins
- Website: sandbyborg.se

Sandby borg is an Iron Age ringfort, one of at least 15 on the island of Öland, Sweden. It sits about 2 kilometers southeast of Södra Sandby village in Sandby parish in southeastern Öland. It is close to the village of Gårdby.

From 2011, the fort has been the subject of excavations, the results of which show that it was the scene of a massacre in the late fifth century AD. The victims of the massacre were never buried, but are found lying as they fell, inside the houses and scattered on the streets of the fort. This has resulted in a unique snapshot-characteristic of the archaeology at Sandby borg, providing new insights both to violence and conflict in the Iron Age, and concerning everyday life in the ringfort.

== Location and size ==
The ringfort of Sandby borg is located adjacent to the shoreline on southeast Öland. Today, the structure consists of an eroded oval stone wall of 2–3 m height enclosing an area of approximately 5000 m^{2}. The walls are made from local limestone with a fill of erratic boulders and pebbles. Three gates are visible as shallow depressions in the wall; crop marks visible in aerial shots of the site suggest the possible presence of a fourth gate. The original ringfort wall was 4 m wide and would have been approximately 4–5 m high.

Aerial photographs and geophysical surveys of the ringfort interior revealed buried stone structures, interpreted as the stone house walls of 53 houses. The layout is similar to that of several other Öland ringforts, e.g. Eketorp, with houses radially placed inside the ring wall and a central block surrounded by a street.

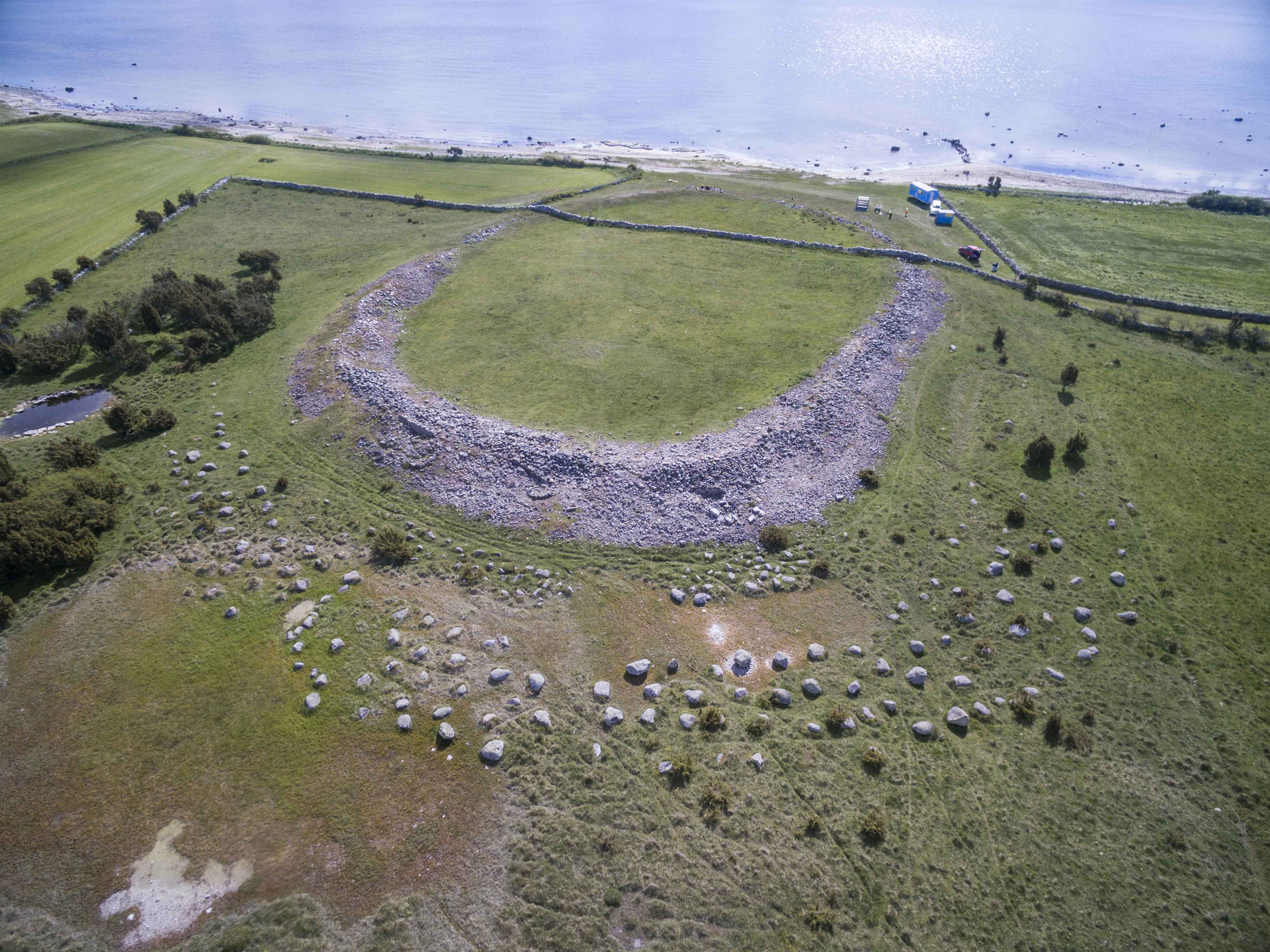
Sandby borg ringfort seen from the west, note the structure of erratic boulders that surround the western perimeter of the fort, photograph by Sebastian Jakobsson

To the west of the ringfort there is a structure consisting of numerous, regularly placed rows of large erratic boulders, probably part of the defensive structure of the fort (see image).

== Archaeological excavation ==
Suspected looting pits were discovered during initial geophysical work by Andreas Viberg in spring 2010. This led the local antiquarian authorities to commission a metal detector survey of the entire site carried out in August 2010. Here, five deposits of exquisite Migration Period jewelry were discovered hidden in different houses within the central block of the fort. Each deposit contained a gilded silver relief brooch along with various items, such as glass beads, finger rings, and silver pendants. The relief brooches are large, prestigious items of a very high quality, typically made of gilded silver and covered with decorative animal art designs. The brooches, which probably were part of the jewelry sets of aristocratic women, are decorated in Salins Style I and spiral ornamentation. Typologically, they can be dated to the period AD 450–510.

Excavations have been undertaken by Kalmar County Museum annually since 2011. During the first campaign, human remains were found inside houses showing that a violent event occurred at the site, probably in the late fifth century AD. After excavation season 2017, some 9% of the ringfort had been excavated including three of the 53 houses. The results include some fascinating snapshots from everyday life at the fort as well as the gruesome evidence of a brutal mass killing, with a minimum number of 26 individuals identified of which nine are represented by more or less complete bodies. The victims range in age from small children to elderly adults. Many of the skeletons show clear evidence of sharp force and blunt force trauma, typically inflicted from above or from behind. This suggests that the killings were acts of execution rather than a regular battle. The fact that the bodies were not buried, but were found lying where they fell, has created unique archaeological source material and a snapshot of Migration period violence.

The rich artefact assemblage from the excavations and surveys includes everyday items such as pottery and tools, as well as more exclusive and prestigious goods such as silver and gold decorations, imported Roman glass, and two Roman gold solidi coins.

== The research project ==
The excavation at Sandby borg was started at a very small scale, in the first years financed by Kalmar County Museum in collaboration with the local authorities. In December 2014, the project successfully raised funds via a Kickstarter campaign to finance the excavations in 2015. This included the complete excavation of House #40, where several skeletons had been found during previous excavations. The target was SEK 400,000, and the Kickstarter campaign managed to raise SEK 465,619 before the deadline of midnight 31 December 2014. The crowdfunded excavation was carried out in June 2015.

During 2016–2018, the project was funded by the Bank of Sweden Tercentenary Foundation. This allowed the full excavation of House 4 in 2016 and House 52 in 2017. The focus of the project is the excavation and subsequent osteological and bioarchaeological analysis of the human skeletal remains, in order to further understand the demography of the victims in the massacre at Sandby borg.

The Sandby borg research project is headed by archaeologists Dr. Helena Victor and Dr. Ludvig Papmehl-Dufay, both at Kalmar County museum. Archaeologist and physical anthropologist Clara Alfsdotter of Bohusläns museum is responsible for the osteological analysis together with Associate Professor Anna Kjellström at the Osteoarchaeological Research Laboratory, Stockholm University. Bioarchaeological analyses are carried out under the supervision of Associate Professor Gunilla Eriksson, Professor Kerstin Lidén and Professor Anders Götherström at the Archaeological Research Laboratory, Stockholm University. A sub-project looking into the cultural heritage of Sandby borg and its implication for present society, is headed by Associate Professor Bodil Petersson at Linnaeus University. Development of digital presentation and documentation of fieldwork is headed by Nicholas Nilsson and Fredrik Gunnarsson at Kalmar County Museum. Since 2014, the project also employs a professional photographer, Daniel Lindskog, and a film-maker, Sebastian Jakobsson. The artefacts recovered during the excavations are preserved by conservator Max Jahrehorn of Oxider.

== Gallery ==
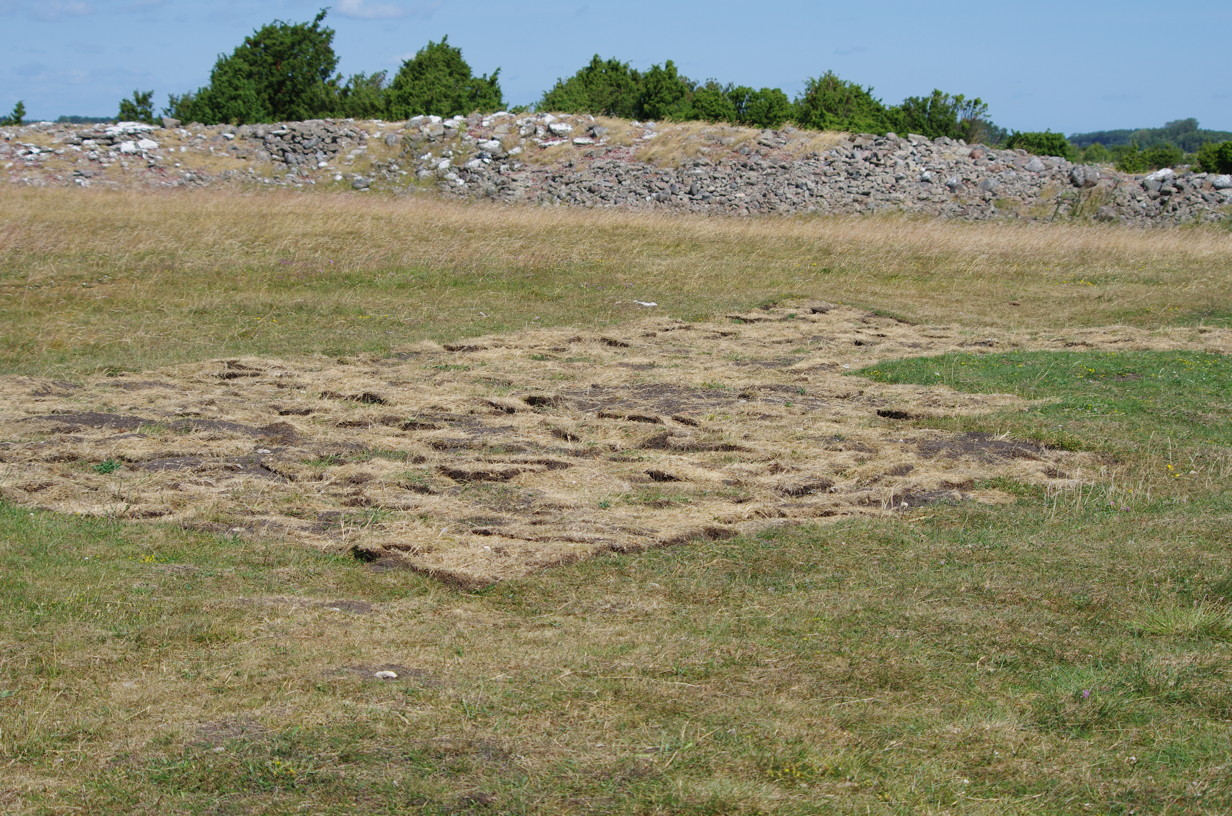
Sandby Borg toward northwest, marks of excavations seen in the middle

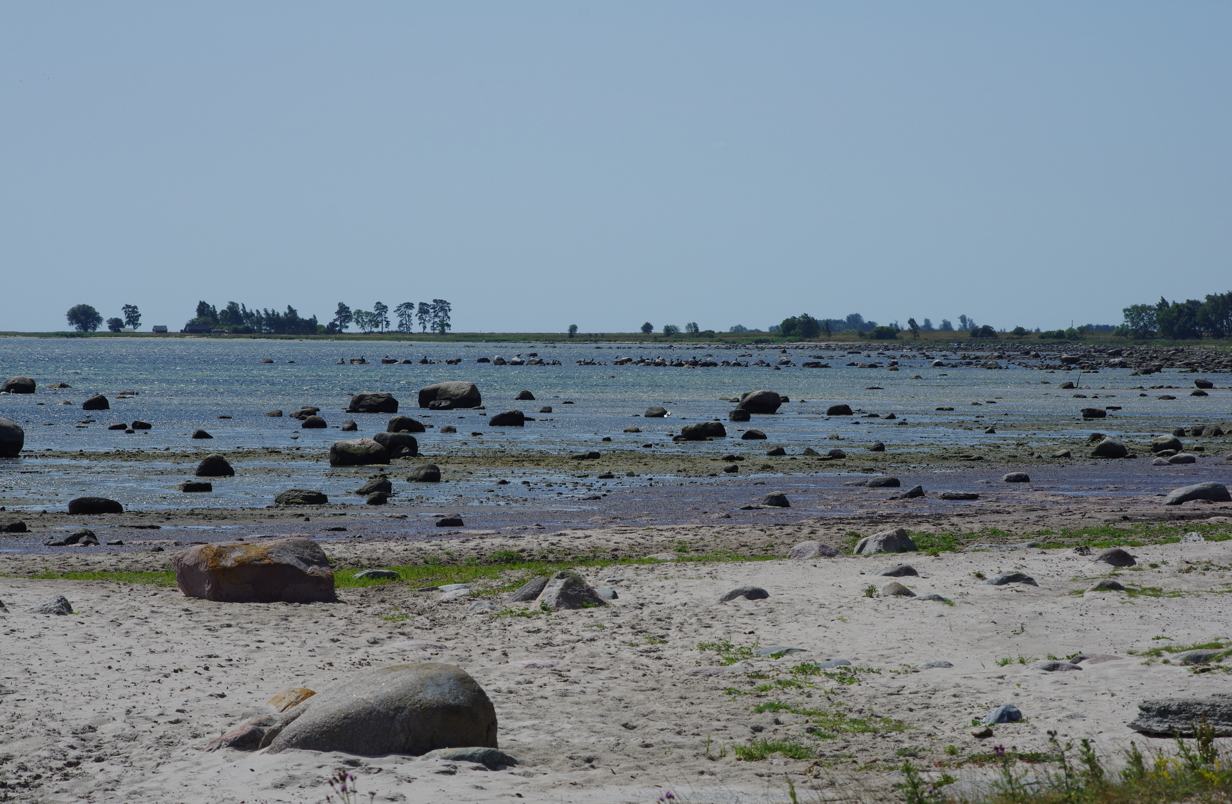
Shallow waters close to Sandby Borg

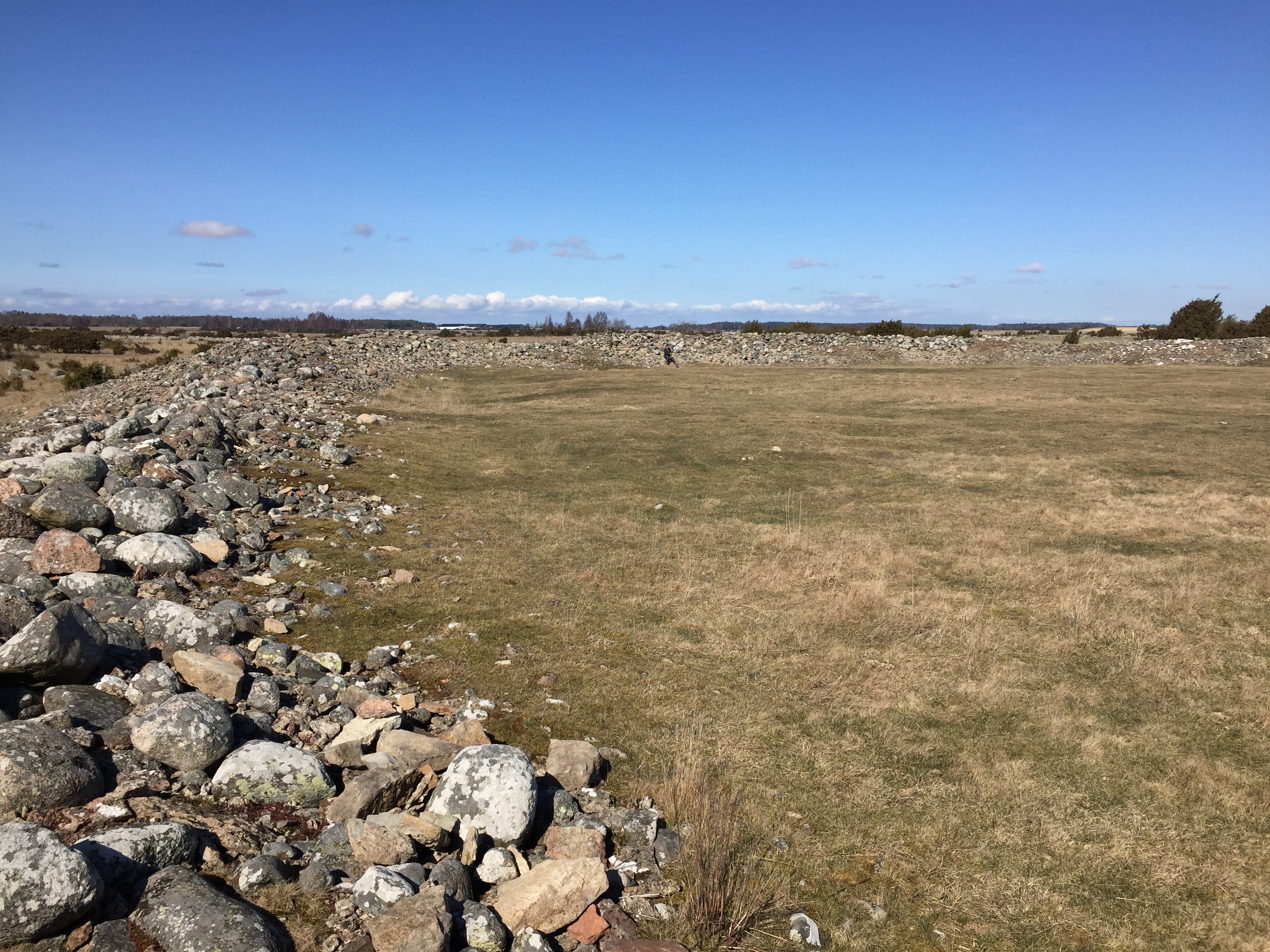
Sandby Borg from inside in northwest direction

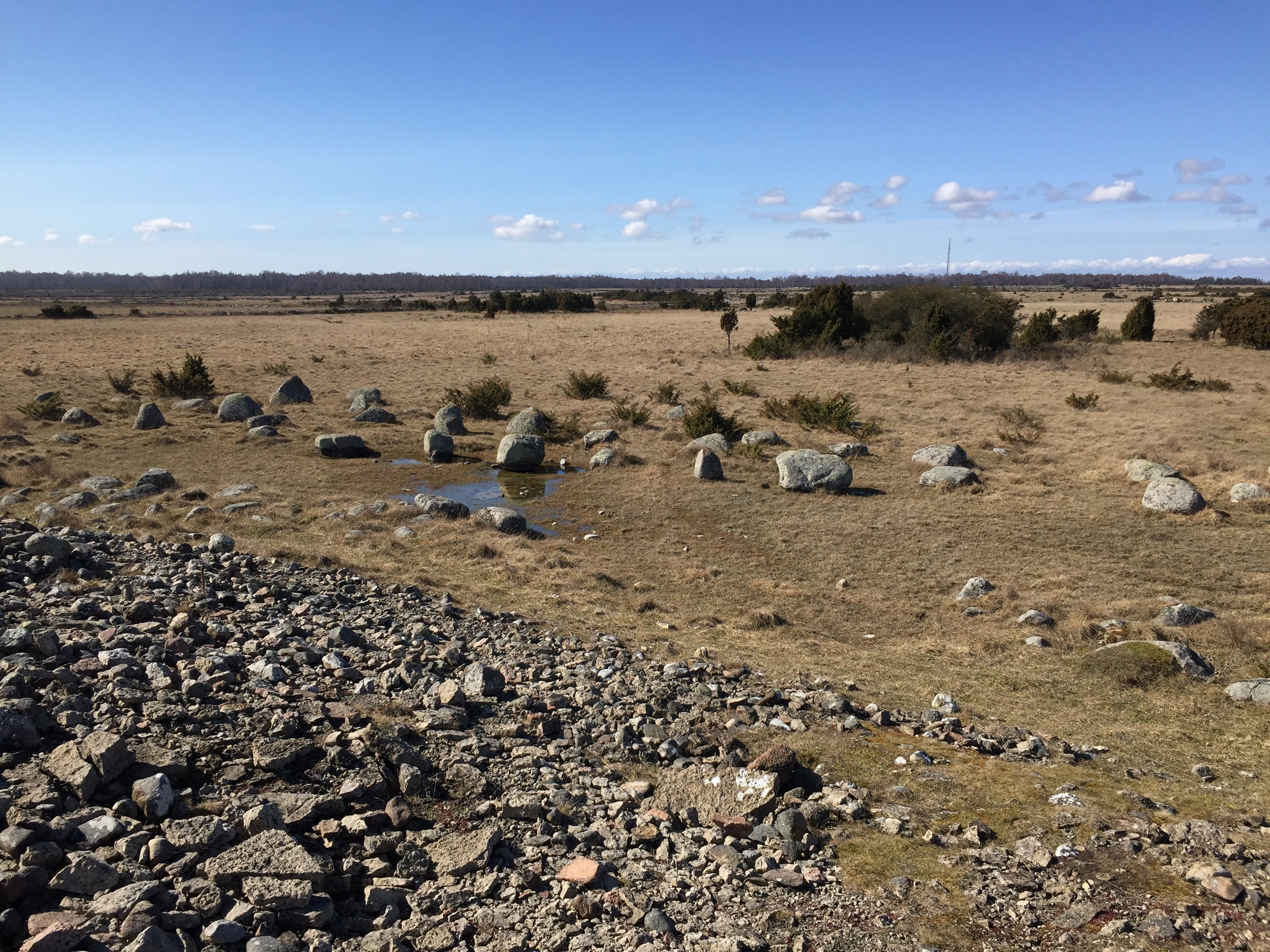
Outer entrenchment on the west side

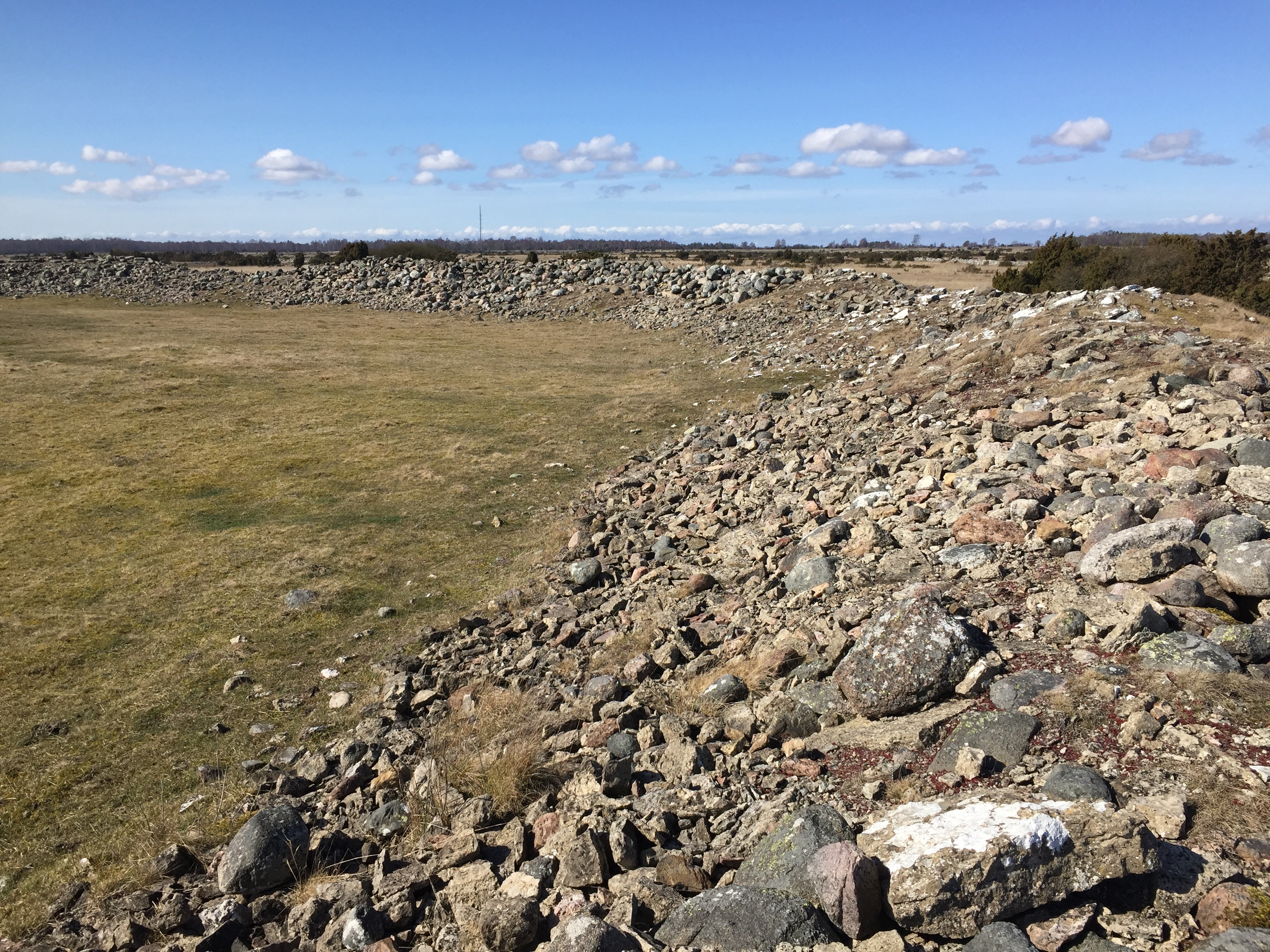
Sandby Borg from inside in southwest direction
