= Fagerum =

Village in Borgholm Municipality, Sweden

Coordinates: 57°16′N 17°01′E

Fagerum is a small village on Öland. It belongs to the municipality of Borgholm.
