= Zeeland Bridge =

Zeeland Bridge Zeelandbrug
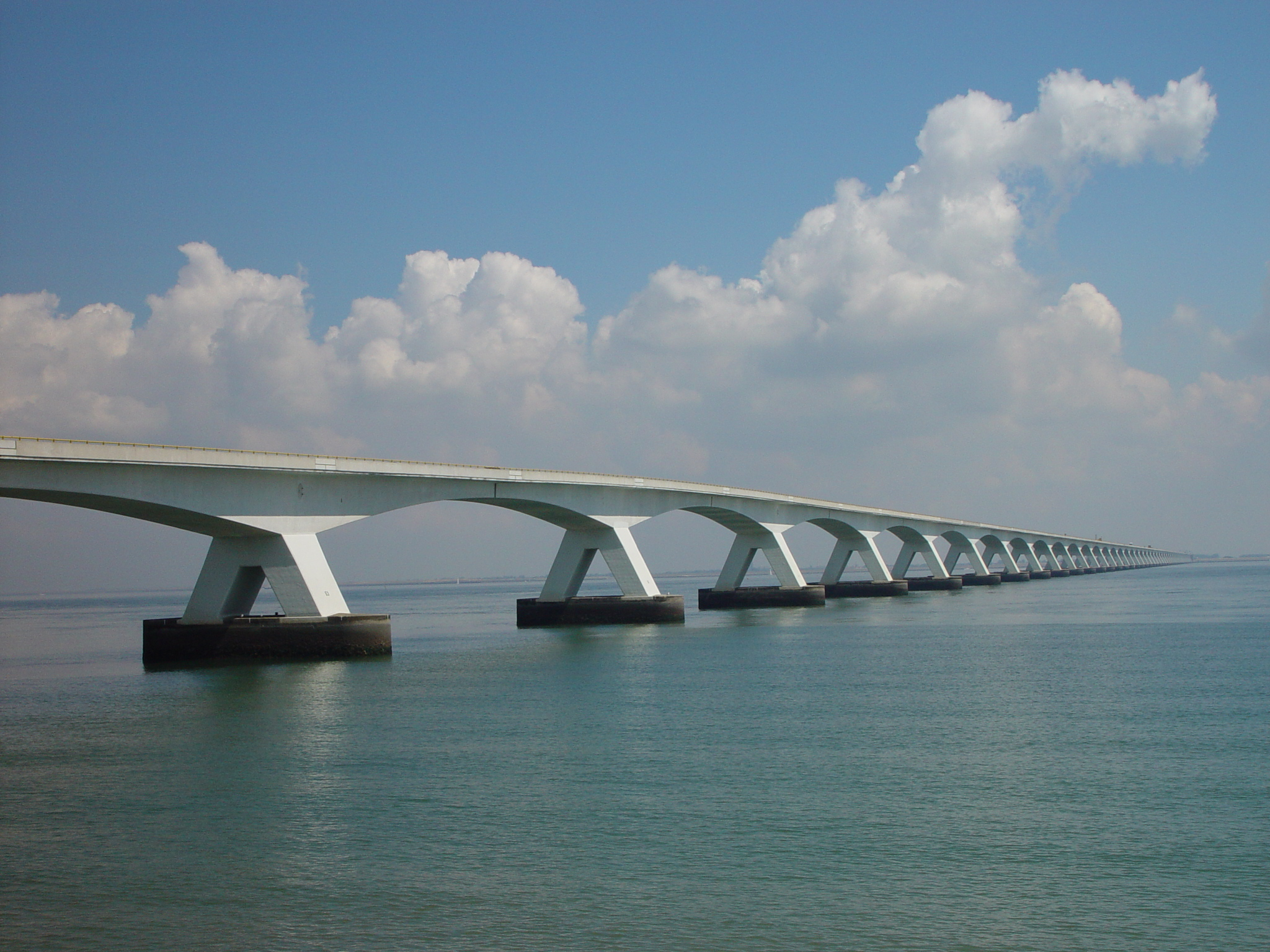
- The Zeeland Bridge in May 2014
- Coordinates: 51°36′40″N 3°53′23″E
- Crosses: Eastern Scheldt estuary
- Locale: Schouwen-Duiveland and Noord-Beveland
- Heritage status: Rijksmonument

Characteristics
- Material: Concrete
- Total length: 5,022 metres (16,476 ft)
- Longest span: 95 metres (312 ft)
- No. of spans: 51
- Piers in water: 54
- Load limit: 50 tonnes (49 long tons; 55 short tons)
- No. of lanes: 2

History
- Constructed by: Van Hattum en Blankevoort NV and NV Amsterdamsche Ballast Maatschappij
- Construction start: 1963
- Construction end: 1965
- Inaugurated: 15 December 1965

Statistics
- Toll: no

The Zeeland Bridge (Dutch: Zeelandbrug) is the longest bridge in the Netherlands. The bridge spans the Eastern Scheldt estuary. It connects the islands of Schouwen-Duiveland and Noord-Beveland in the province of Zeeland.

The Zeeland Bridge was built between 1963 and 1965. It was inaugurated on 15 December 1965 by Queen Juliana of the Netherlands, and was originally called Eastern Scheldt Bridge (Dutch: Oosterscheldebrug) before being renamed the Zealand Bridge on 13 April 1967. At the time of its completion, it was the longest bridge in Europe. It has a total length of 5,022 metres, and consists of 48 spans of 95 metres, 2 spans of 72.5 metres and a movable bridge with a width of 40 metres.

The province of Zeeland borrowed the money for the construction of the bridge. The loan was repaid by levying tolls for the first 24 years.

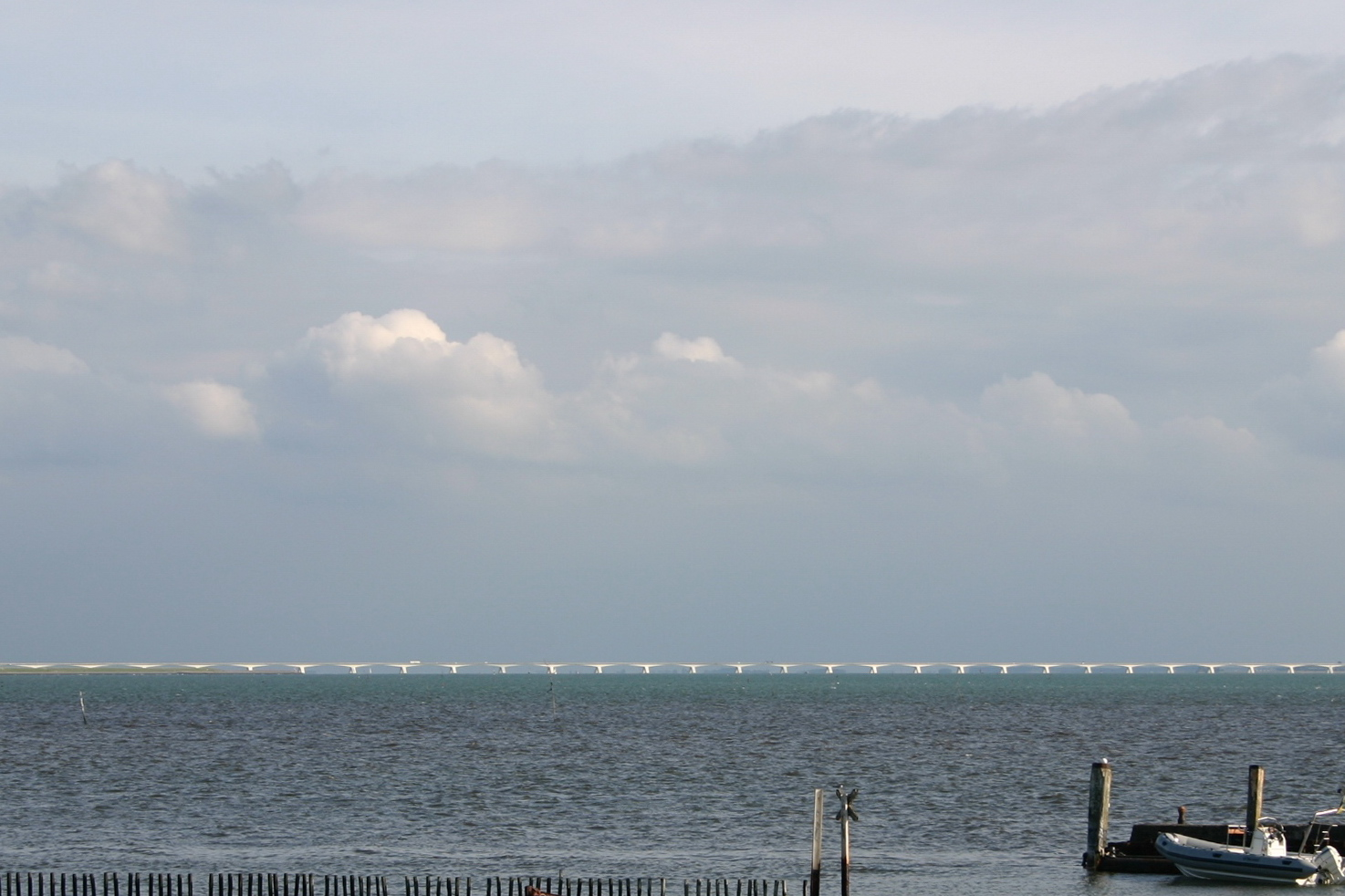
Side view

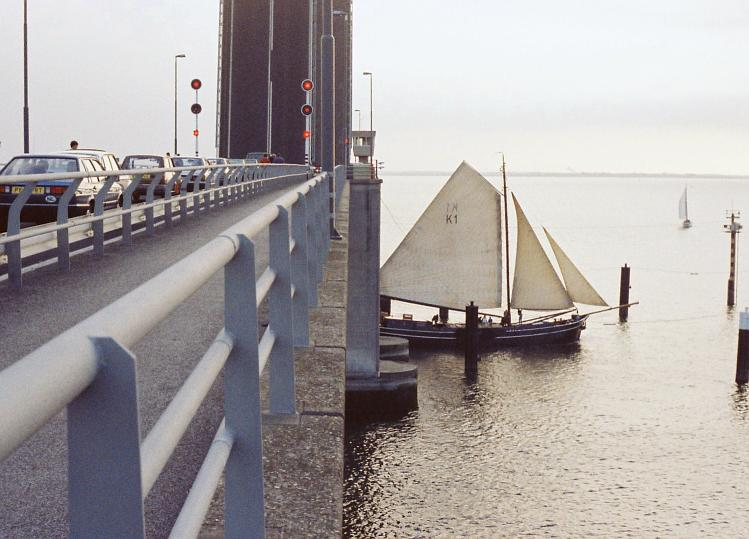
Zeeland Bridge (bascule bridge part)

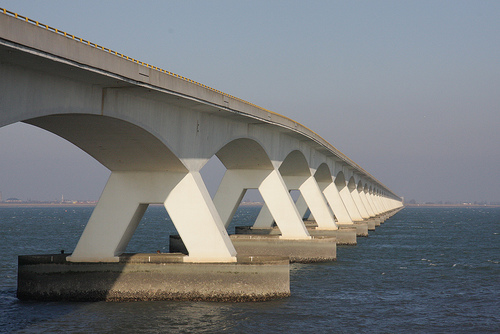
Side view

Records
Preceded by Saratov Bridge	Europe’s longest bridge 1965 – 1972	Succeeded by Öland Bridge
