= Coat of arms of Öland =

- Armiger: Province of Öland, Sweden
- Adopted: 1944
- Shield: Azure a deer Or attired, hoofed and gorged gules.

Öland is a province of Sweden and, like many of Sweden's provinces, was granted a coat of arms in preparation for the funeral of Gustav Vasa in 1560. Confusion arose between Öland's arms with one deer and Åland's arms with two deer and nine roses, resulting in Öland bearing the wrong coat of arms from the 1880s until an audit in 1944.

== A confusing error ==
The coat of arms originally granted for the island province of Öland in 1560 displayed a golden red deer on a blue field and generally resembled Öland's present arms but lacked the deer's red collar and red antlers. In 1569, the island province of Åland had been given to the queen dowager Katarina Stenbock as a fief and was awarded a coat of arms displaying two roe deer on a field strewn with nine roses. The arms of these two similar-sounding provinces became confused early on, and in the 1880s Öland's arms were recorded as two roe deer with nine roses.

During a heraldic revision in 1944, the office of the Swedish Herald of the Realm (Riksheraldikerämbetet) discovered that a mistake had been committed. It was then decided the Öland deer should have a collar, something which had sometimes occurred before and had been considered for Djurgården. So in 1944 the arms of Öland were reverted to the single golden red deer, which at this time was granted the distinction of a collar, marking it as the royal game.

Heraldic authorities in Finland had long since granted Åland (which Sweden had ceded to Russia in 1809 along with the rest of Finland) arms bearing a single golden red deer on a blue field. In 1944 they were notified of the error but ultimately decided not make any changes and not to adopt the coat of arms originally intended for Åland with the roe deer and the nine Finnish roses. This decision made it necessary for Swedish heralds to once again alter the coat of arms for Öland, to avoid further confusion. This change included the introduction of a red collar and red antlers and hooves.

Arms granted to Öland in 1560 and used there prior to the 1569 transfer of Åland, subsequently used there until present day

Arms designed for Åland in the 16th century but instead used by Öland (officially 1880s–1944, but also used earlier)

Arms granted to Öland in 1944, with the red collar added and the attire changed to red to distinguish it from Åland

== Öland's arms 1944-present ==
Official blazon (in Swedish): "I blått fält en gående hjort av guld med rött halsband och röd beväring, därest sådan skall komma till användning." (In a blue field a walking deer of gold with red collar and red arms, when such shall come to use.)

The arms are displayed with a ducal coronet. The province was originally ranked as an earldom but following a decision by the Privy Council on January 18, 1884 gave all Provinces the right of use to a ducal coronet for their arms.

== Related arms ==
=== Åland ===
Coat of arms of Åland

Åland is today an autonomous province of Finland. The arms of Öland and Åland had been confused, leading Öland to adopt the arms intended for Åland, featuring two golden deer on a blue field strewn with nine white roses. Åland, meanwhile, retained the arms which had originally been granted to Öland in 1560 (a golden deer on a blue field). The arms of Åland are displayed with a comital coronet.

Blazon (in Swedish): "I blått fält en gående hjort av guld." ("Azure, a hart passant Or".)

Blazon (in Finnish): "Sinisessä kentässä on kävelevä kultainen saksanhirvi."

=== Kalmar County ===
Coat of arms of Kalmar County

The Kalmar County includes the eastern part of Småland and the island province of Öland. The arms are a combination of the arms of Småland and Öland. The arms are displayed with a royal crown, representing the County Administrative Board.

Blazon (in Swedish): "Sköld kvadrerad av Smålands och Ölands vapen." ("Quartered, the arms of Småland and Öland.")

== See also ==
- Swedish heraldry
