= Färjestaden =

Locality in Kalmar County, Sweden

- Locality
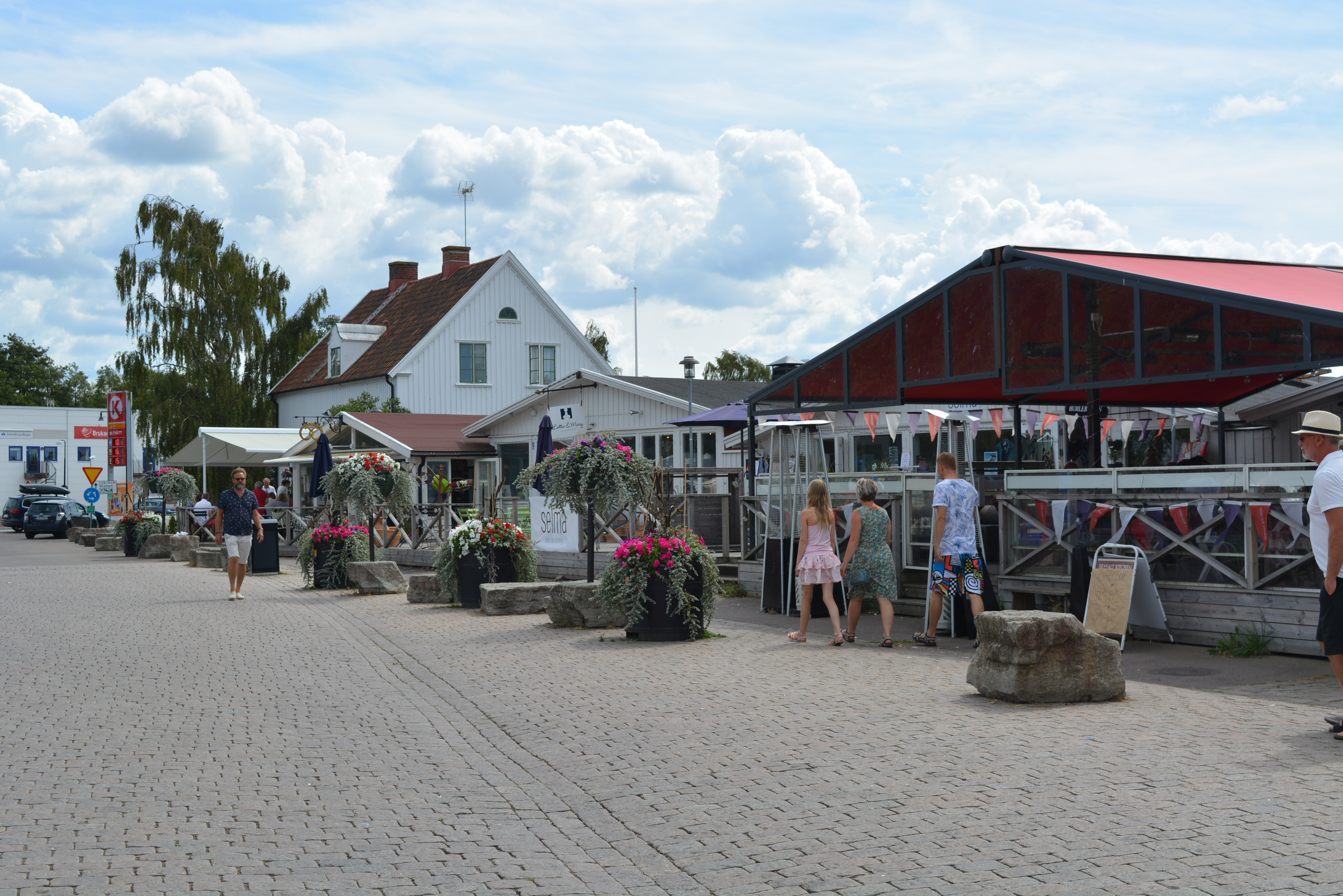

- Location within Kalmar Location within Sweden
- Coordinates: 56°39′N 16°29′E
- Country: Sweden
- Province: Öland
- County: Kalmar County
- Municipality: Mörbylånga Municipality

Area
  - Total: 4.64 km^{2} (1.79 sq mi)

Population (31 December 2010)
  - Total: 5,018
  - Density: 1,082/km^{2} (2,800/sq mi)
- Time zone: UTC+1 (CET)
  - Summer (DST): UTC+2 (CEST)

Färjestaden is a locality situated in Mörbylånga Municipality, Kalmar County, Sweden with 5,018 inhabitants in 2010. It is located in the southern part of the island of Öland, on the Kalmar Strait side, south of Borgholm. Färjestaden, literally The Ferry Town, is named after the ferries that used to be the only connection to the mainland. Nowadays the car-bridge Ölandsbron connects the mainland with the island, and Färjestaden has had an impressive population increase, making it several times bigger than the town Mörbylånga.

In the city center of Färjestaden there is a shopping mall with, among other things, a pharmacy, grocery store and local library.

FBC Kalmarsund is based in the town.
