= Borgholm Castle =

Historic fortress in Sweden

- Borgholms slott
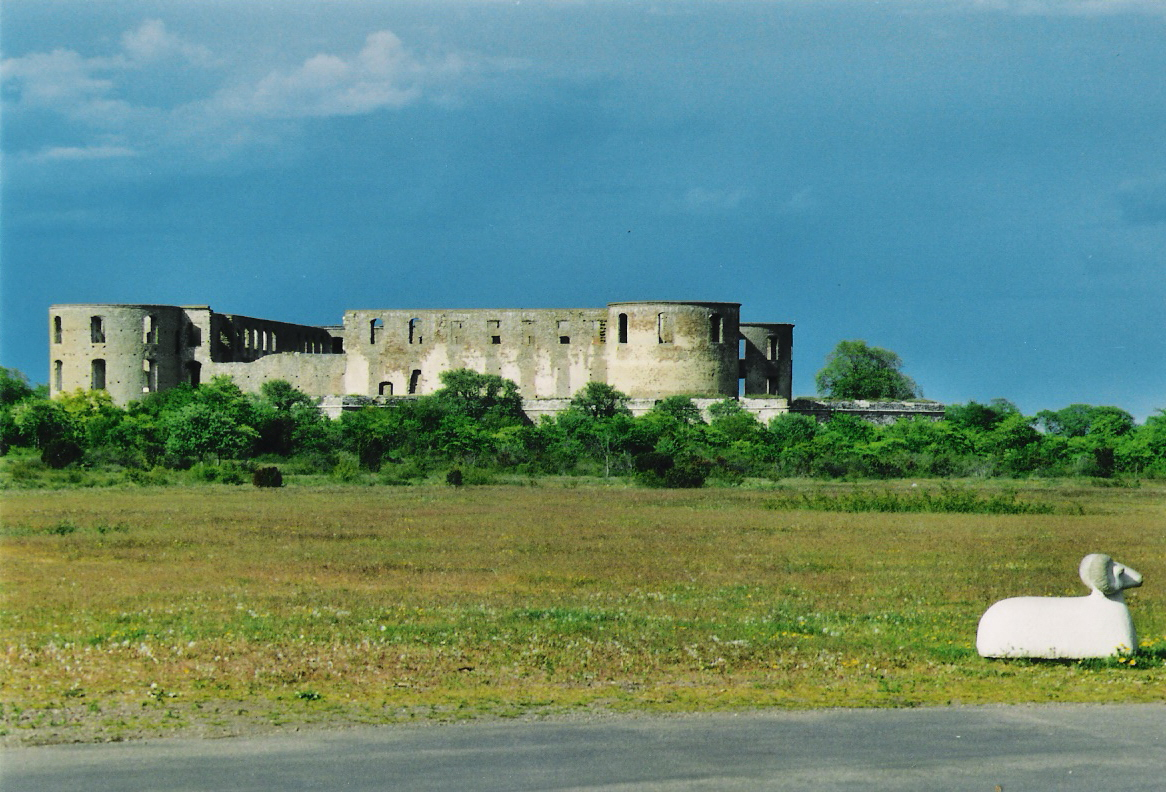
- A distant view of Borgholm Castle
- Interactive map of the Borgholm Castle area

General information
- Architectural style: Baroque
- Location: Borgholm, Sweden
- Coordinates: 56°52′15″N 16°38′39″E
- Construction started: 1654
- Demolished: 14 October 1806

Design and construction
- Architect: Nicodemus Tessin the Elder

Borgholm Castle (Swedish: Borgholms slott) in Borgholm, Sweden, is today only a ruin of the fortress that was first built in the second half of the 13th century and rebuilt many times in later centuries. It is linked to Halltorp estate, to the south. The castle was destroyed in a fire on 14 October 1806.

== History ==
The construction of the original fortress was probably ordered by King Canute I, although this is not totally certain. He reigned 1167–1195 and had fortresses built on the Swedish east coast as defence against enemies from the other side of the Baltic Sea. During the 13th to 15th centuries, additions and changes were made. For example, new towers were built, and a new and thicker wall was constructed. The fortress was damaged on a number of occasions during these centuries, including in 1361, when King Valdemar IV (Atterdag) of Denmark attacked Borgholm.

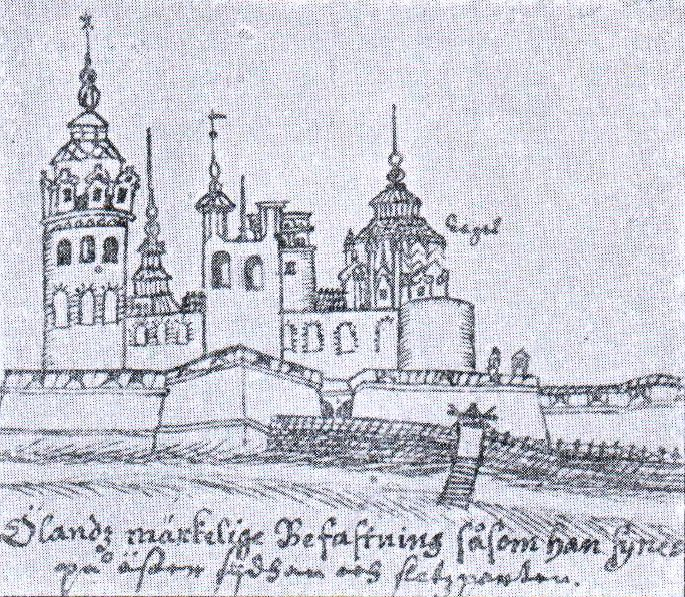
Drawing of Borgholm Castle from 1634

During the Kalmar Union, many castles and fortresses in Sweden were damaged as a result of the ongoing conflicts between Danes and Swedes. When Gustav Eriksson became Swedish king and the union was dissolved, he, together with the sons that followed him on the throne, invested huge sums of money in repairing these buildings. It was Gustav's son John III (r. 1568–1592) who ordered the reconstruction of Borgholm into a renaissance castle. During his reign, the Pahr brothers (four engineers and architects from Milan) led a significant rebuilding that took place from 1572. The castle acquired a Gothic character and became exemplary of the Italianate bastion style.

Some decades later, Sweden and Denmark fought each other in the Kalmar War. Borgholm Castle first, in 1611, surrendered to the Danish side, but was reconquered by the Swedish side later the same year. The following year, after a siege of two weeks, the commander of the Swedish defence, Peter Michelsen Hammarskiöld, had to surrender. In accordance with the treaty that followed the war, the Treaty of Knäred, Borgholm was handed back to the Swedish.

The castle was in a bad shape after the war and it took until 1654 before a restoration and reconstruction would begin. This time, the castle was to be turned into a baroque palace. Charles X Gustav was the king who ordered this, and Nicodemus Tessin the Elder was the architect engaged to fulfill the king's wishes. When Charles Gustaf died in 1660, the construction stopped, only to be restarted at a slow pace during the reigns of King Charles XI and King Charles XII. In 1709, the construction was finally completed.

For a hundred years, the palace was left to fall into decay. On 14 October 1806, the castle was turned into a ruin by a fire that started in the roof of the north wing.

== Today ==
The castle of today is the ruins of the 17th century baroque palace Charles X Gustav had constructed. It is State-owned and managed by the National Property Board of Sweden (Swedish: Statens Fastighetsverk). It is open for visitors and houses a museum.

The inner courtyard hosts concerts, theater performances, and other events. In the summer of 1989, Swedish pop group Roxette shot material for six music videos during a concert. One of them is "Listen to Your Heart", which became the group's second number one hit on the Billboard Hot 100 later that year. In July 2001, Bob Dylan played the courtyard.

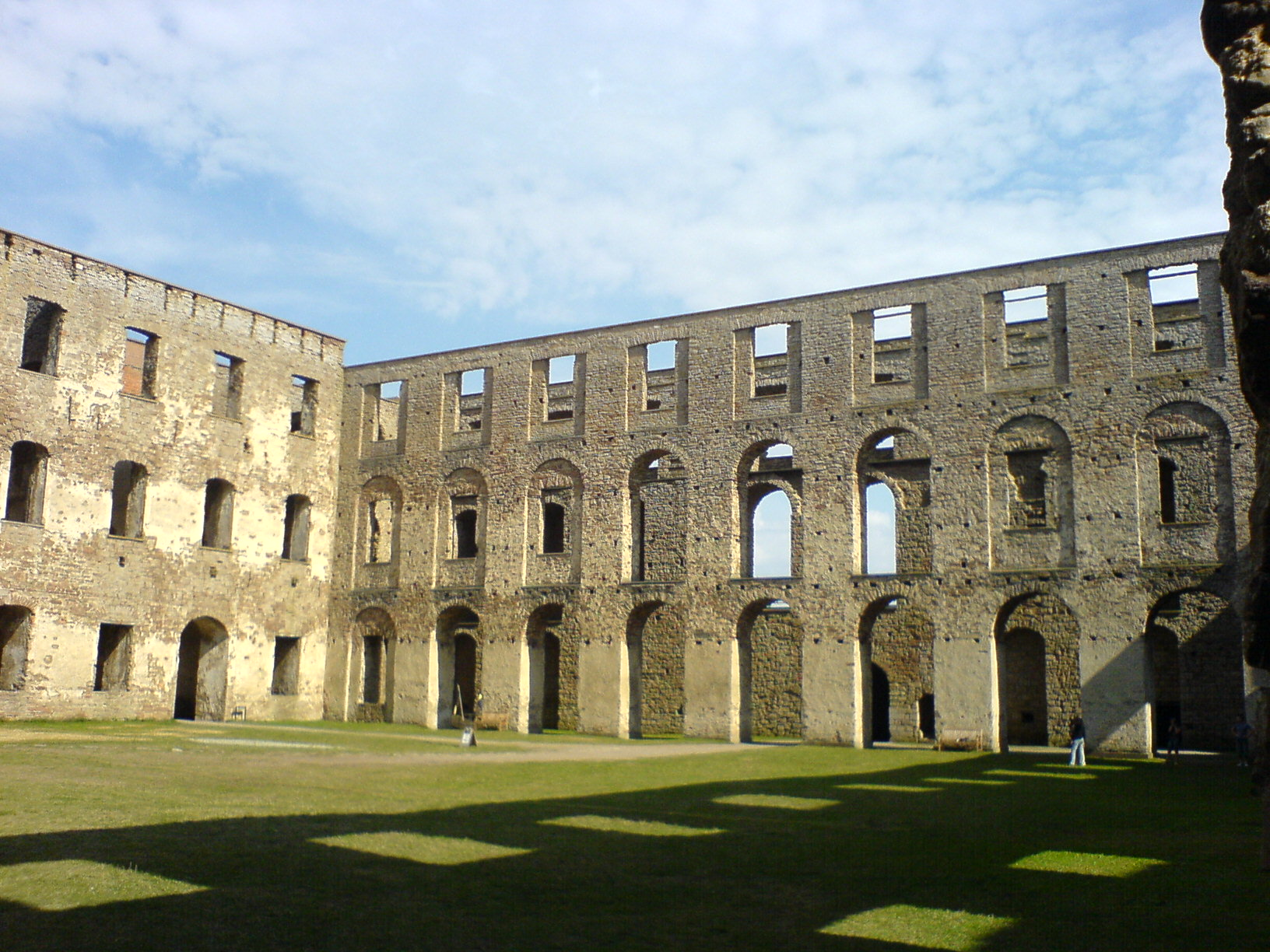
The interior of Borgholm Castle

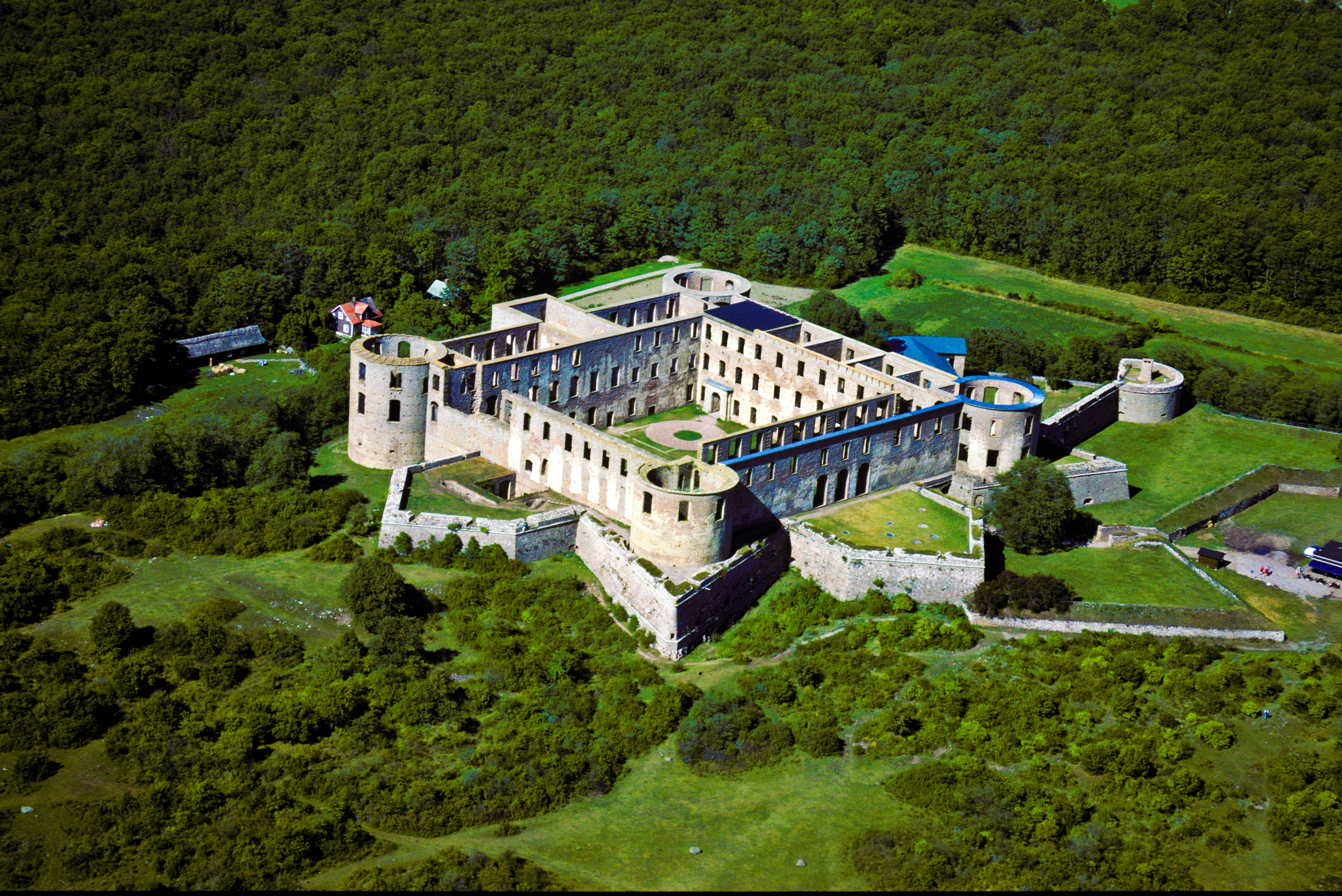
Aerial view of Borgholm Castle

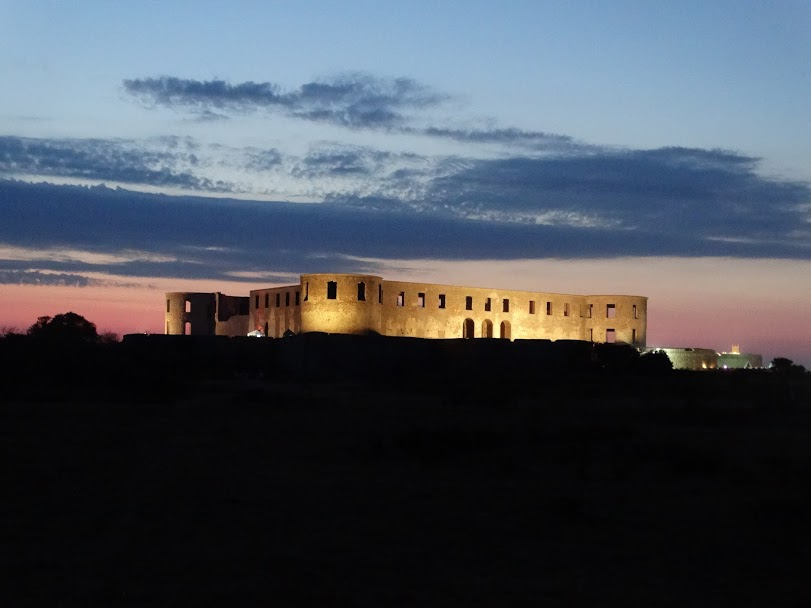
Borgholm Castle at night

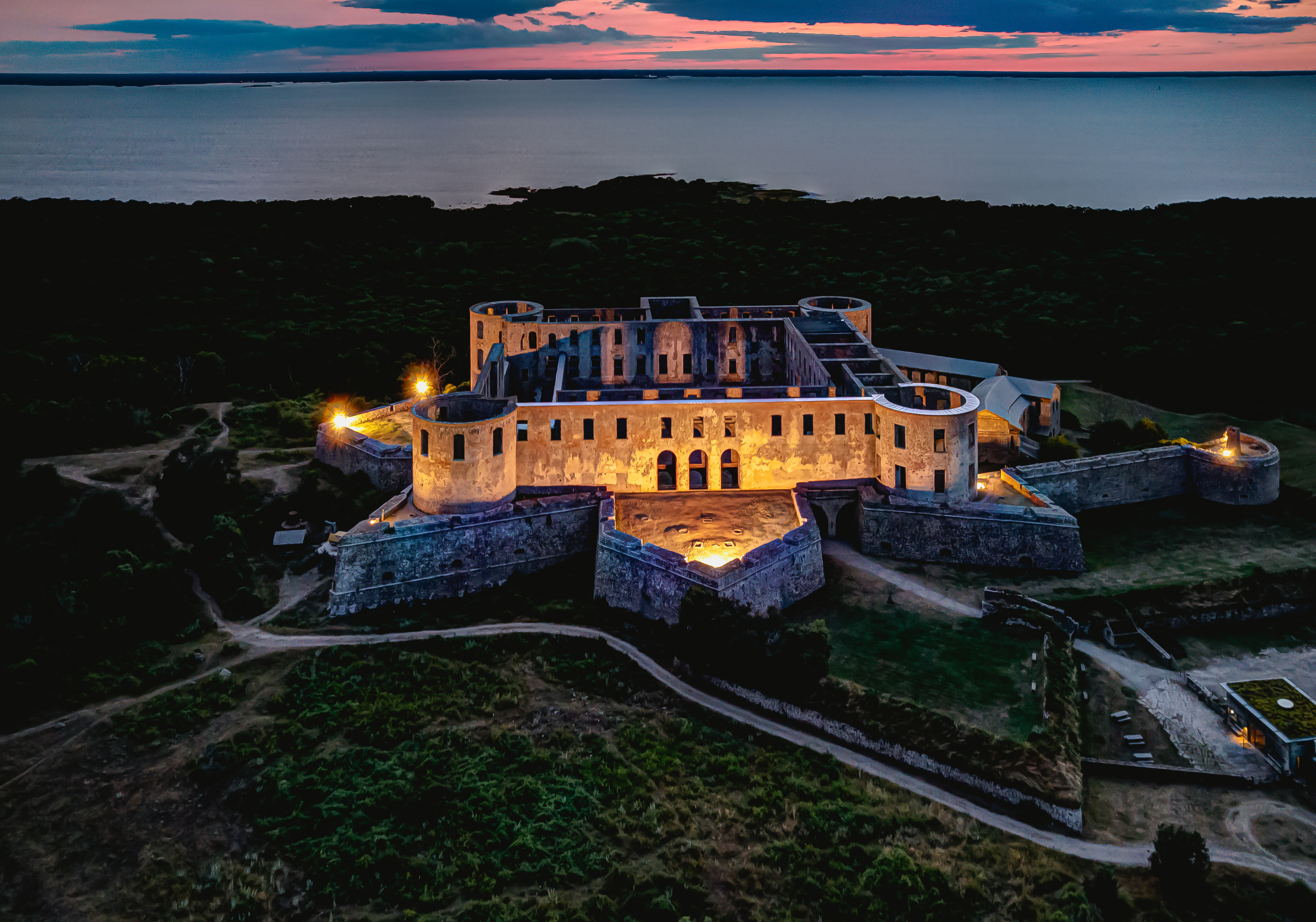
