= Öland =

Second-largest island in Sweden

- Historical province
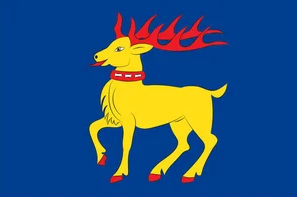
- Flag Coat of arms

- Location of Öland in Sweden

Area
  - Total: 1,345.44 km^{2} (519.48 sq mi)

Population (31 December 2024)
  - Total: 26,892
  - Density: 19.988/km^{2} (51.767/sq mi)
- Time zone: UTC+01:00 (CET)
  - Summer (DST): UTC+02:00 (CEST)

Öland
Nickname: Island of the Sun and winds
- Location within Sweden

Geography
- Location: Baltic Sea
- Coordinates: 56°44′N 16°40′E
- Area: 1,342 km^{2} (518 sq mi)
- Length: 137 km (85.1 mi)
- Width: 16 km (9.9 mi)
- Highest elevation: 55 m (180 ft)
- Highest point: Högsrum

Administration
- Sweden
- County: Kalmar County
- Municipality: Borgholm Municipality and Mörbylånga Municipality
- Largest settlement: Färjestaden (pop. 5 018 inv.)

Demographics
- Demonym: Ölandish
- Population: 25,846 (2016)
- Pop. density: 18.63/km^{2} (48.25/sq mi)
- Ethnic groups: Swedish

Ramsar Wetland
- Official name: Öland, eastern coastal areas
- Designated: 5 December 1974
- Reference no.: 18

Öland (UK: /ˈɜːrlænd/, US: /ˈɜːrlɑːnd, ˈʌl-/; Swedish: [ˈø̌ːland]; sometimes written Oland internationally) is the second-largest Swedish island and the smallest of the traditional provinces of Sweden. Öland has an area of 1,342 square kilometres (518 square miles) and is located in the Baltic Sea just off the coast of Småland. The island has over 26,000 inhabitants.

It is separated from the mainland by the Kalmar Strait and connected to it by the 6-kilometre (3 1/2 mi) Öland Bridge, which opened on 30 September 1972. The county seat Kalmar is on the mainland at the other end of the bridge and is an important commercial centre related to the Öland economy. The island's two municipalities are Borgholm and Mörbylånga named after their municipal seats. Much of the island is farmland, with fertile plains aided by the mild and sunny weather during summer.

Öland does not have separate political representation at the national level, and is fully integrated into Sweden as part of Kalmar County.

== Administration ==
The traditional provinces of Sweden no longer serve administrative or political purposes but still exist as historical and cultural entities. Öland is part of the administrative county of Kalmar County (Kalmar län) and consists of the two municipalities of Borgholm and Mörbylånga. There was an Öland County in the short period between 1819 and 1826; otherwise, the island has been part of Kalmar County since 1634.

== Heraldry ==
Coat of arms and flag of Öland, used since 1555

Öland was granted provincial arms in 1560, but it would not be until the 1940s that the province was assigned its proper ones. The arms granted to Öland had been mixed up with the arms granted to Åland and this was not discovered until the 20th century. While Öland changed its coat of arms, Åland, which was now a Finnish (autonomous) province, kept its established but originally unintended coat of arms. The deer is meant to symbolize the status of Öland as a royal game park and the arms are topped by a ducal crown. Blazon: "Azure a Deer Or attired, hoofed and gorged Gules".

== History ==
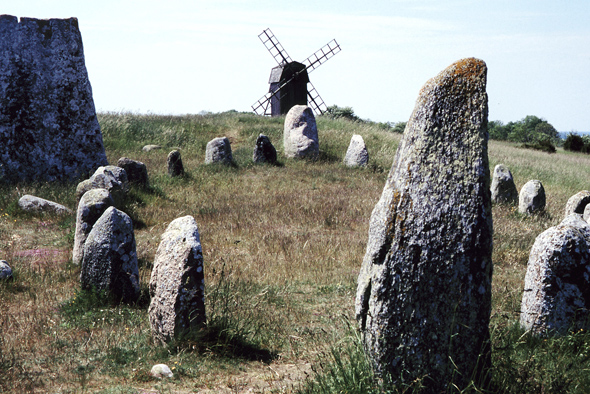
Iron Age burial ground at Gettlinge

Archaeological evidence indicates the island of Öland was settled about 8000 BC, with excavations dating from the Paleolithic era showing the presence of hunter-gatherers. In the early Stone Age, settlers from the mainland migrated across the ice bridge that connected the island across the Kalmar Strait.

Evidence of habitation of Öland occurred at least as early as 6000 BC, when there were Stone Age settlements at Alby and other locations on the island. Burial grounds from the Iron Age through the Viking Age are clearly visible at Gettlinge, Hulterstad and other places on the perimeter ridge including stone ships. There are nineteen Iron Age ringforts identified on the island, only one of which, Eketorp, has been completely excavated, yielding over 24,000 artifacts. Around 900 AD, Wulfstan of Hedeby called the island "Eowland", the land of the Eowans:

Then, after the land of the Burgundians, we had on our left the lands that have been called from the earliest times Blekingey, and Meore, and Eowland, and Gotland, all which territory is subject to the Sweons; and Weonodland [the land of the Wends] was all the way on our right, as far as Weissel-mouth.

However, this is not the first mention of the Eowans. There is an even earlier mention of the tribe in the Anglo-Saxon poem Widsith:

Oswin ruled the Eowans
and Gefwulf the Jutes,
Finn Folcwalding
The Frisian clan.
Sigar longest
ruled the sea-Danes

Scholars such as Schütte and Kendrick have pointed out that there was probably an even earlier mention of the people of Öland in 98 AD, by Tacitus, who called them the "Aviones":

After the Langobardi come the Reudigni, Auiones, Angli, Warini, Eudoses, Suarines and Nuithones all well guarded by rivers and forests. There is nothing remarkable about any of these tribes unless the common worship of Nerthus, that is Earth Mother, is considered. They believed she was interested in men's affairs and walked among them. On an island in the ocean sea there is a sacred grove where a holy wagon covered by a drape awaits.

In Swedish history, the island long served as a royal game park; Ottenby and Halltorp were in particular selected by the Swedish Crown in the Middle Ages as royal game reserves.

== Geography ==
Map of Öland

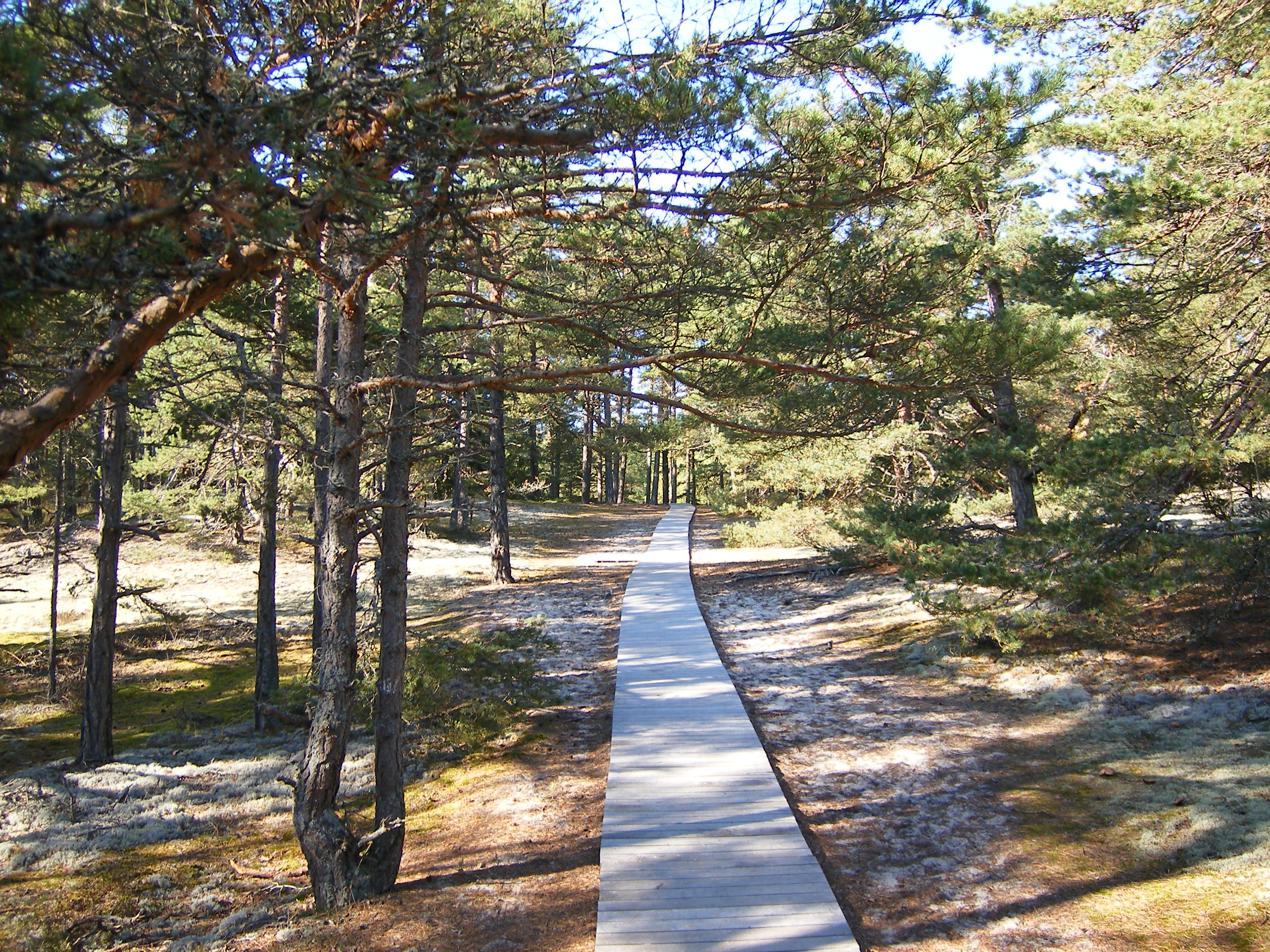
Homrevet, Northern Öland

Öland is the second largest of the islands of Sweden and was historically divided into one chartered city and five hundreds.

=== Cities and villages ===
- Alby
- Bläsinge
- Borgholm (1816)
- Gårdby
- Gettlinge
- Eriksöre
- Fagerum
- Färjestaden
- Hulterstad
- Köpingsvik
- Mörbylånga
- Norra Möckleby
- Öjkroken
- Ottenby
- Seby
- Segerstad
- Södra Sandby
- Stenåsa

=== Hundreds ===
- Åkerbo Hundred
- Algutsrum Hundred
- Gräsgård Hundred
- Möckleby Hundred
- Runsten Hundred
- Slättbo Hundred

=== Facts ===
- Highest Hill: Högsrum, 55 m (180 ft)
- Largest lake: Hornsjön
- Length: 137 km (85 mi)
- Width (at widest point): 16 km (10 mi)

== Climate ==
Öland has a semi-continental oceanic climate with considerable temperature differences between summer and winter. There are two main weather stations, one located at the northern edge and the other at the southern edge. In spite of the more northerly latitude, Öland's northern edge is far milder than its southern edge, since air warm over greater surrounding landmasses during days, whilst retaining heavy maritime features during night. It is also more representative for the island's general climate, with only the deep south being much cooler down a narrow peninsula.

Climate data for Öland's Northern Edge, temperature 2002–2021; sunshine June 2008–2018; extremes since 1901
Month	Jan	Feb	Mar	Apr	May	Jun	Jul	Aug	Sep	Oct	Nov	Dec	Year
Record high °C (°F)	10.8 (51.4)	14.5 (58.1)	17.3 (63.1)	23.3 (73.9)	28.5 (83.3)	32.0 (89.6)	31.5 (88.7)	31.0 (87.8)	26.6 (79.9)	22.1 (71.8)	16.3 (61.3)	12.1 (53.8)	32.0 (89.6)
Mean maximum °C (°F)	7.5 (45.5)	7.7 (45.9)	13.4 (56.1)	17.5 (63.5)	22.6 (72.7)	26.8 (80.2)	28.0 (82.4)	26.9 (80.4)	22.9 (73.2)	16.9 (62.4)	11.7 (53.1)	8.4 (47.1)	29.2 (84.6)
Mean daily maximum °C (°F)	2.6 (36.7)	2.6 (36.7)	5.3 (41.5)	9.3 (48.7)	14.4 (57.9)	20.1 (68.2)	22.7 (72.9)	22.1 (71.8)	17.8 (64.0)	11.6 (52.9)	7.4 (45.3)	4.3 (39.7)	11.7 (53.0)
Daily mean °C (°F)	0.9 (33.6)	0.8 (33.4)	2.8 (37.0)	6.3 (43.3)	11.6 (52.9)	16.3 (61.3)	19.2 (66.6)	18.8 (65.8)	15.1 (59.2)	9.6 (49.3)	5.8 (42.4)	2.8 (37.0)	9.2 (48.5)
Mean daily minimum °C (°F)	−0.9 (30.4)	−1.1 (30.0)	0.3 (32.5)	3.3 (37.9)	7.7 (45.9)	12.5 (54.5)	15.6 (60.1)	15.5 (59.9)	12.3 (54.1)	7.6 (45.7)	4.2 (39.6)	1.2 (34.2)	6.5 (43.7)
Mean minimum °C (°F)	−6.0 (21.2)	−6.1 (21.0)	−4.5 (23.9)	−0.5 (31.1)	3.1 (37.6)	8.4 (47.1)	12.1 (53.8)	11.8 (53.2)	8.3 (46.9)	2.6 (36.7)	−0.8 (30.6)	−3.9 (25.0)	−8.1 (17.4)
Record low °C (°F)	−24.5 (−12.1)	−28.0 (−18.4)	−25.2 (−13.4)	−14.0 (6.8)	−2.0 (28.4)	2.1 (35.8)	8.2 (46.8)	8.2 (46.8)	3.2 (37.8)	−2.5 (27.5)	−7.0 (19.4)	−13.8 (7.2)	−28.0 (−18.4)
Average precipitation mm (inches)	28.8 (1.13)	19.4 (0.76)	20.8 (0.82)	16.2 (0.64)	23.6 (0.93)	36.3 (1.43)	54.7 (2.15)	49.9 (1.96)	22.7 (0.89)	42.8 (1.69)	39.3 (1.55)	31.5 (1.24)	386 (15.19)
Mean monthly sunshine hours	39	57	166	254	323	322	315	263	188	90	42	33	2,092
Source 1: SMHI Open Data for Ölands norra udde, temperature
Source 2: SMHI Open Data for Ölands norra udde, precipitation

Climate data for Öland's Southern Edge (2002-2020; precipitation 1961-1990; extremes since 1937)
Month	Jan	Feb	Mar	Apr	May	Jun	Jul	Aug	Sep	Oct	Nov	Dec	Year
Record high °C (°F)	9.8 (49.6)	8.3 (46.9)	12.6 (54.7)	16.3 (61.3)	21.2 (70.2)	25.7 (78.3)	28.7 (83.7)	27.9 (82.2)	26.5 (79.7)	17.5 (63.5)	13.3 (55.9)	10.5 (50.9)	28.7 (83.7)
Mean daily maximum °C (°F)	2.8 (37.0)	2.4 (36.3)	4.3 (39.7)	8.0 (46.4)	12.1 (53.8)	16.5 (61.7)	19.4 (66.9)	19.8 (67.6)	17.1 (62.8)	11.8 (53.2)	8.1 (46.6)	5.3 (41.5)	10.6 (51.1)
Daily mean °C (°F)	1.3 (34.3)	0.9 (33.6)	2.5 (36.5)	5.8 (42.4)	9.9 (49.8)	14.4 (57.9)	17.0 (62.6)	17.5 (63.5)	14.9 (58.8)	10.0 (50.0)	6.6 (43.9)	3.5 (38.3)	8.7 (47.6)
Mean daily minimum °C (°F)	−0.2 (31.6)	−0.5 (31.1)	0.6 (33.1)	3.5 (38.3)	7.6 (45.7)	12.4 (54.3)	14.9 (58.8)	15.2 (59.4)	12.8 (55.0)	8.1 (46.6)	5.1 (41.2)	1.8 (35.2)	6.8 (44.2)
Record low °C (°F)	−23.0 (−9.4)	−20.4 (−4.7)	−20.9 (−5.6)	−8.7 (16.3)	−1.3 (29.7)	2.8 (37.0)	7.9 (46.2)	6.4 (43.5)	2.5 (36.5)	−4.2 (24.4)	−9.2 (15.4)	−15.9 (3.4)	−23.0 (−9.4)
Average precipitation mm (inches)	33 (1.3)	24 (0.9)	25 (1.0)	24 (0.9)	27 (1.1)	30 (1.2)	41 (1.6)	39 (1.5)	41 (1.6)	35 (1.4)	43 (1.7)	37 (1.5)	400 (15.7)
Source 1: SMHI
Source 2: SMHI Monthly Data 2002-2015

== Environment ==
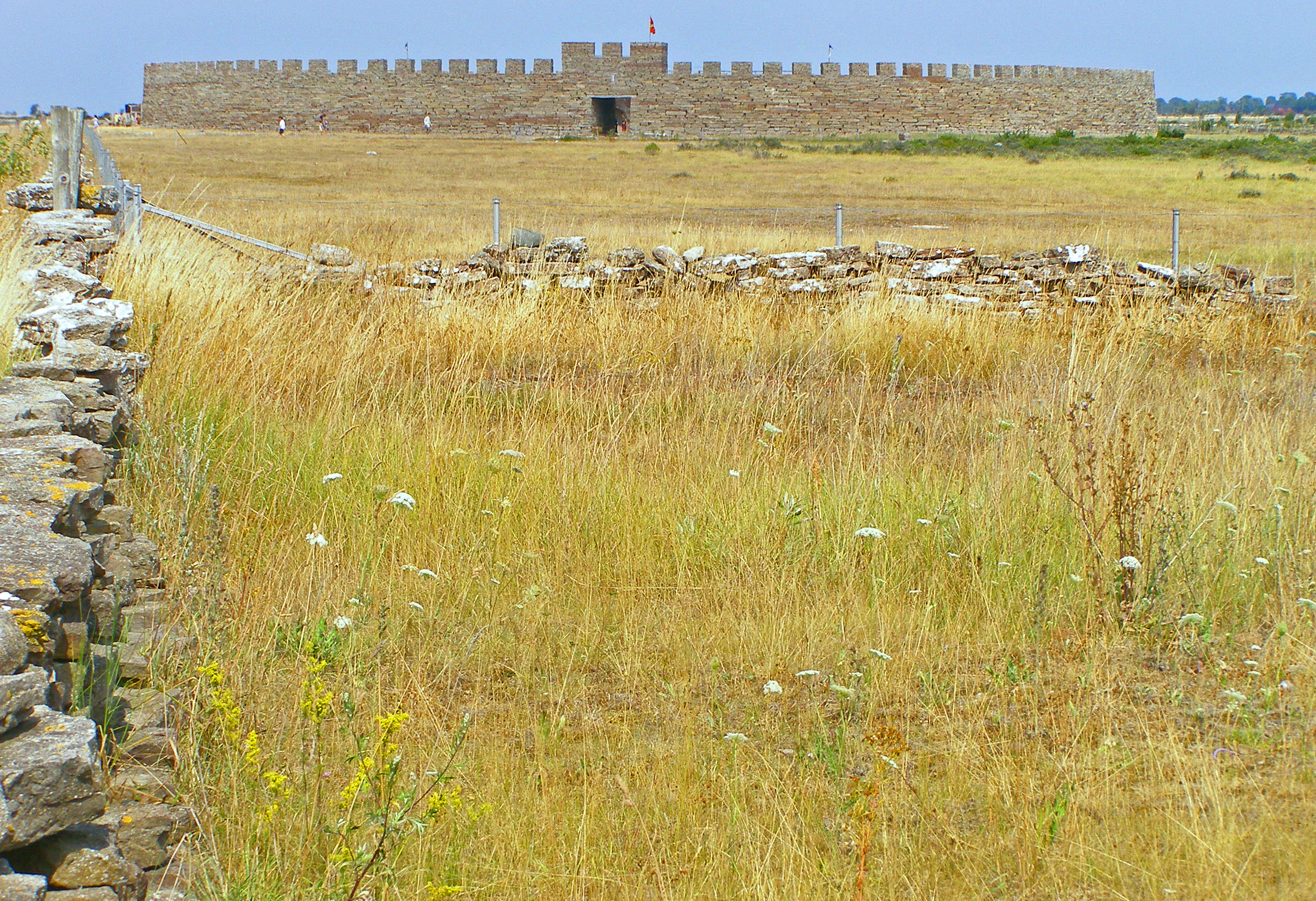
Stora Alvaret on southeast of Öland with Eketorp Fortress in background

The dominant environmental feature of the island is the Stora Alvaret, a limestone pavement which is the habitat of numerous rare and endangered species. The first known scientific study of the biota of the Stora Alvaret occurred in the year 1741 with the visit of Linnaeus. The underlying bedrock layer is mainly Cambrian sandstone and alum chert, and Ordovician limestone that dates from an approximate range of 540 to 450 million years ago. The Cambrian trilobite Eccaparadoxides oelandicus is named after the island.

Öland is served by a perimeter highway, Route 136. In 2011 the Gripen Gas company filed a request for test drilling on Öland for natural gas. The request was approved by Bergsstaten, the governmental agency responsible for handling geological issues regarding prospecting. The approval has been met with criticism on the municipal and county administrative levels, citing that the many cracks in the limestone bedrock could cause the groundwater to become contaminated by the gas prospecting.

=== Important Bird Area ===
The eastern coast of Öland, including its grazed meadows, marshes, chalk cliffs and sandbanks, has been designated an 30,000 ha Important Bird Area (IBA) by BirdLife International because it supports a suite of waterfowl, waders and terns, as well as breeding white-tailed sea-eagles.

== Culture ==
The Borgholm Castle was built between 1669 and 1681 for Queen Hedvig Eleonora, and designed by Nicodemus Tessin the Elder. In its vicinity sits the Solliden Palace, summer home to the royal family.

The limestone pavement habitat of southern Öland, known as Stora Alvaret, has been entered as a site of the UNESCO World Heritage program. Features of this are the many rare species found; prehistory sites such as Gettlinge and Eketorp; numerous old wooden windmills left standing, some of which date to the 17th century; and the special geological alvar landscape.

For a decade, Öland has been organizing an annual harvest festival called Skördefesten that takes place every October. In terms of this event, the island's farmers gather with farmers from the rest of the country and sell their crops and let those that are interested take part in everyday life on their farms, among other activities. There are also many art exhibitions for display during Skördefesten especially during the art night Konstnatten.

The romantic poet Erik Johan Stagnelius was born in the Öland parish of Gärdslösa in 1793 and lived there until 16 years of age. He wrote several poems about the island. More modern writers living on or writing about Öland include novelist Margit Friberg (1904–1997), poet Anna Rydstedt (1928–1994), novelist Birgitta Trotzig (1929-2011), poet Lennart Sjögren (1930-), children novelist Eva Bexell (1945-), poet Tom Hedlund (1945-), novelist Johan Theorin (1963-), poet and novelist Magnus Utvik (1964-) and novelist Per Planhammar (1965-).

== Transport ==
The island is served by Kalmar Öland Airport which provides direct routes to Stockholm which are operated by Scandinavian Airlines. However, the airport is located 17 km (11 mi) on the mainland near the city of Kalmar, which is easily accessible by crossing over the Öland bridge.

== Skördefest ==
Skördefest is an annual harvest festival on Öland, held every September, which attracts thousands of visitors. Pumpkins are placed upon the top of bales of hay, a signal to buyers that fall harvest goods are available for sale at the location. In Borgholm, a pumpagubbe (pumpkin man), a large scarecrow like figure, built entirely of gourds, is erected at town center. The pumpagubbe celebrates the bounty of the Fall Harvest.

== Sports ==
Football in the province is administered by Smålands Fotbollförbund. Each year the King's Rally, a vintage motorcade, takes place in Öland.

== See also ==
- Alby, Öland
- Gettlinge
- Halltorp
- List of places on Öland
- Ottenby
- Sandby borg, a site where a ringfort and Roman artifacts have been found

=== Battles ===
- Battle of Öland (1563)
- First battle of Öland (1564)
- Battle of Öland (1676)
- Battle of Öland (1789)
