= Gårdby =

- Location within Kalmar Location within Sweden
- Coordinates: 56°36′N 16°38′E
- Country: Sweden
- Province: Öland
- County: Kalmar County
- Municipality: Mörbylånga Municipality

Area
  - Total: 0.61 km^{2} (0.24 sq mi)

Population (31 December 2010)
  - Total: 257
  - Density: 419/km^{2} (1,090/sq mi)
- Time zone: UTC+1 (CET)
  - Summer (DST): UTC+2 (CEST)

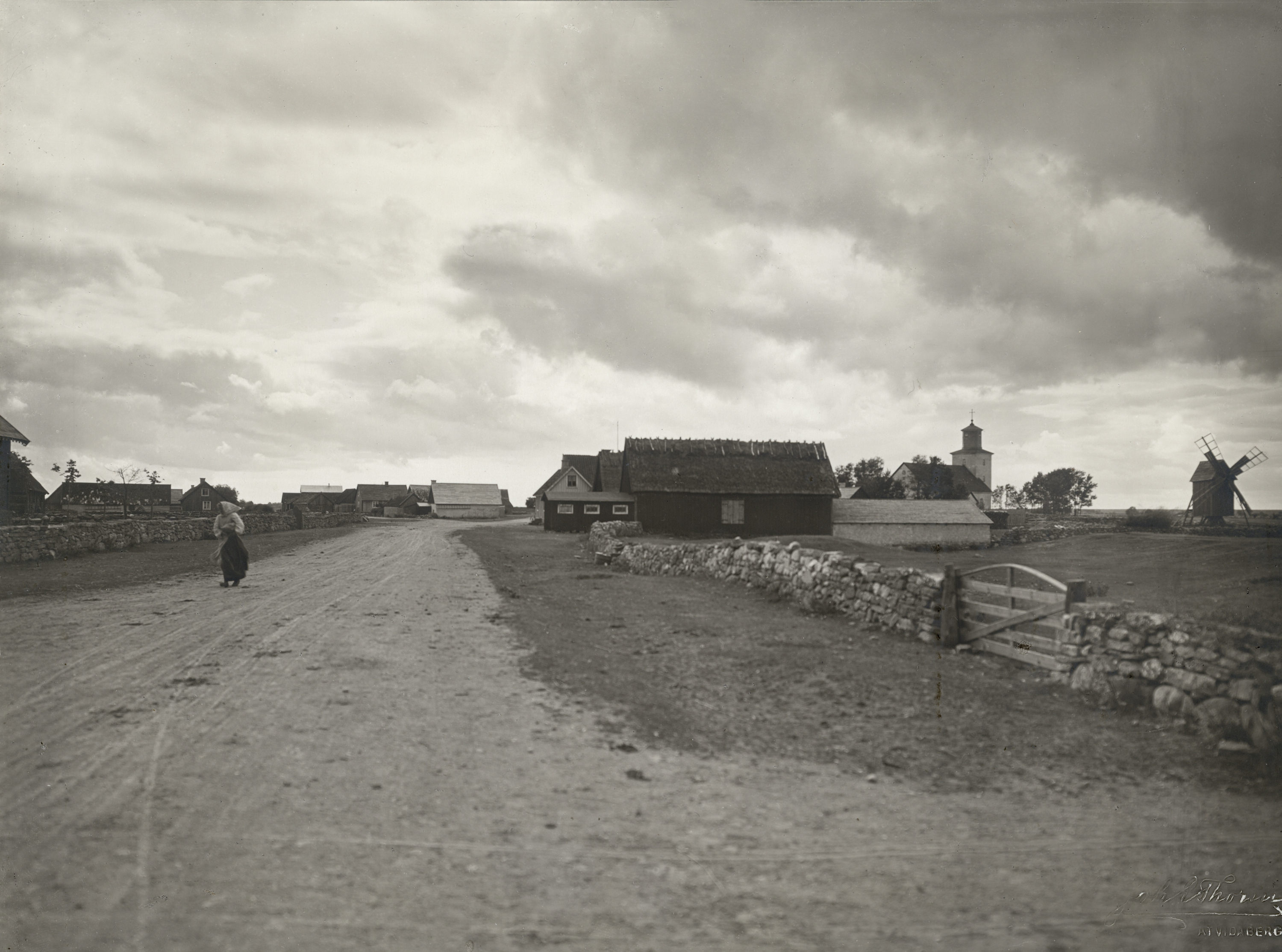
Gårdby in 1906

Gårdby is a locality situated in Mörbylånga Municipality, Kalmar County, Sweden with 257 inhabitants in 2010.
