= Öland bridge =

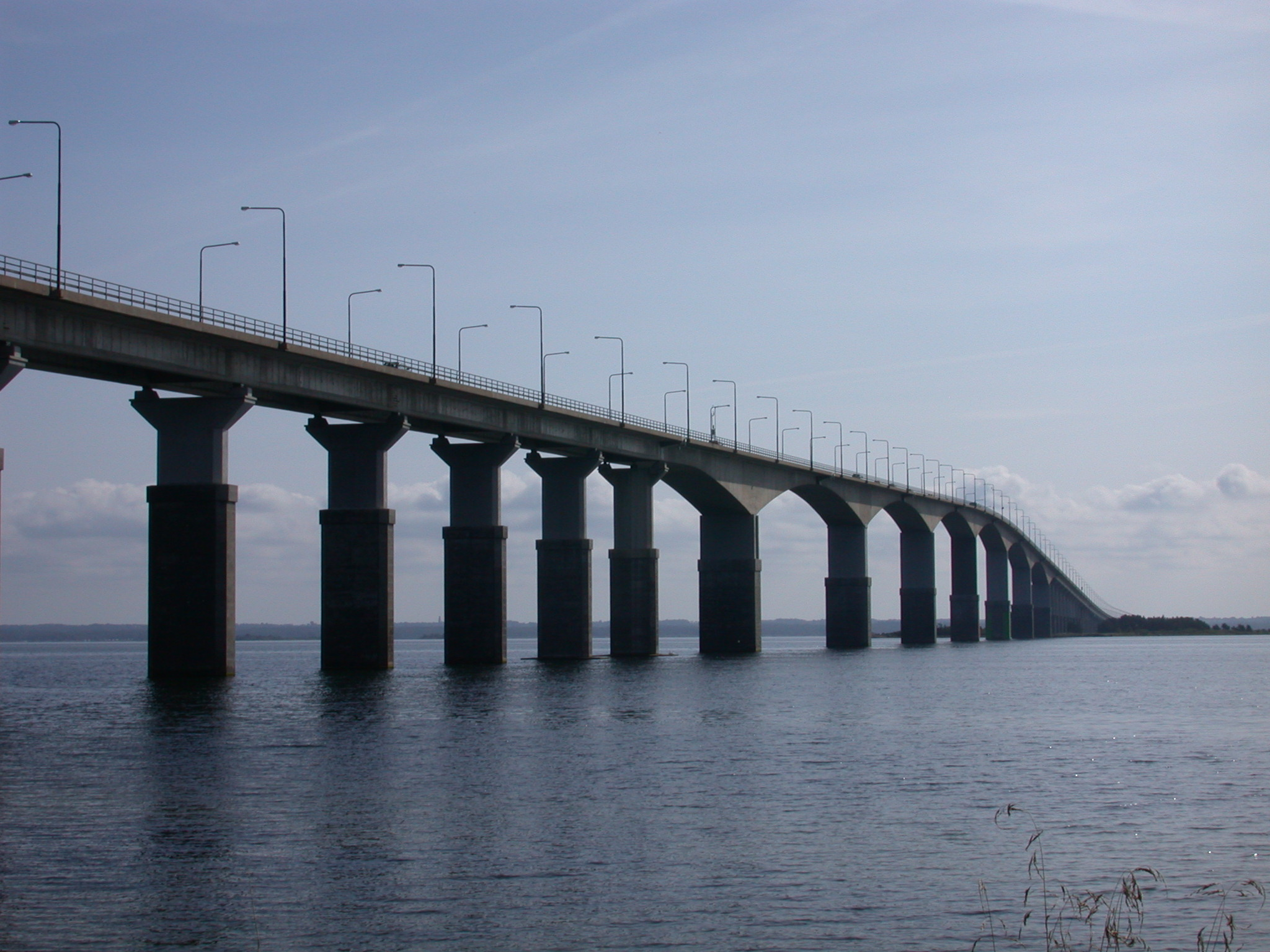
- Coordinates: 56°40′30″N 16°25′00″E
- Carries: 4 lanes of roadway for motor vehicles
- Crosses: Kalmar Strait
- Locale: Färjestaden
- Official name: Ölandsbron
- Maintained by: Swedish Transport Administration

Characteristics
- Total length: 6,072 m (19,921 ft)
- Width: 13 m (43 ft)
- Longest span: 130 m (430 ft)
- Clearance below: 36 m (118 ft)

History
- Opened: 30 September 1972

The Öland bridge (Swedish: Ölandsbron) is a road bridge in Sweden that spans the Kalmar Strait, between Jutnabben in Kalmar on the mainland and Möllstorp in Algutsrum parish near Färjestaden on Öland in the Baltic Sea.

It is a 6,072-metre (3 3/4-mile) long beam bridge with a clear bridge width of 13 metres (43 ft). Maximum height 41.69 metres (136 ft 9 in), minimum height 6.65 metres (21 ft 10 in). The bridge is built of reinforced concrete in 155 spans, including the high bridge section in 6 spans of 130 metres (430 ft), and has a characteristic hump at its western end which was created to provide a vertical clearance of 36 metres (118 ft) for shipping. The Öland bridge is one of the longest in all of Europe (the longest one until completion of Vasco da Gama Bridge in 1998) and currently Sweden's longest bridge, if one only compares the bridge sections that are on Swedish territory (the Öresund Bridge, which is longer, is partly built on Danish territory).

A little to the south of the western end of the bridge a small wooden pedestrian and bicycle bridge, around 150 metres (160 yards) in length and connecting the island of Svinö to the mainland, echoes the form of the Öland bridge. This "replica" is clearly visible to anyone crossing to Öland via the main bridge. The road crossing the bridge is County Road 137, which connects to the E22 on the mainland, and County Road 136 on Öland.

== Construction ==
The plan for a fixed link between Öland and the Swedish mainland had existed for a long time and led to a number of motions in the Swedish parliament and inquiries. The first concrete proposal was presented in 1932, and in the 1950s the question of the Öland bridge was raised. Parliamentary politician Fritz Börjesson was a strong driving force for a fixed link between Kalmar and Öland. Another advocate was Uno Danielson, a forester on Öland.

On 18 November 1966, the Swedish government adopted a plan for the construction of major bridges, which included the Öland bridge. The first sod was turned on the Småland side by then Minister of Communications Svante Lundkvist (S) on 30 December 1967. On the Öland side, the first sod was turned on 4 January 1968 by MP Fritz Börjesson (C).

The Öland bridge was inaugurated on 30 September 1972. Among the speakers at the ceremony, which took place on the island side of the bridge, was the Crown Prince Carl Gustaf. The bridge cost 80 million Swedish kronor to build. Construction took 4.5 years, and about 100,000 cubic metres (130,000 cu yd) of concrete was used. The bridge was also prepared for transporting fresh water from the mainland to Öland. The bridge project received much support, but there were also protests. The main objection was that the bridge would threaten the environment, possibly causing a huge influx of tourists to Öland and its vulnerable and precious nature.

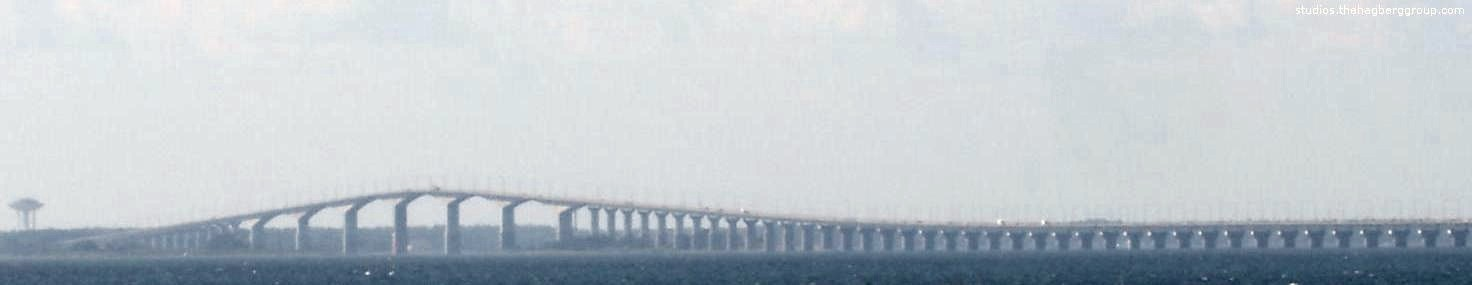
The Öland bridge as seen from the Öland side

Already in connection with the decision to build the Ölandsbron, emigration from Öland was reversed. A large number of homes began to be built in Färjestaden and the surrounding area. The Öland bridge cost SEK 130 million to build. Or wasn't it 80 MSEK, as stated above?

=== Maintenance ===
During the construction of the bridge, mixing concrete with brackish water from Kalmarsund was allowed for certain structural parts, which caused corrosion of the reinforcement in the bridge.

Between 1972 and 2017, the Öland Bridge has been maintained and improved for approximately SEK 1.1 billion according to the 2010 price level. Also after correction for inflation, this is more than the cost to build the bridge; SEK 80 as well as 130 million is mentioned above.

== See also ==
- List of bridges
- List of longest bridges in the world

Records
Preceded by Zeeland Bridge	Europe’s longest bridge 1972–1998	Succeeded by Vasco da Gama Bridge
