= Kalmar Strait =

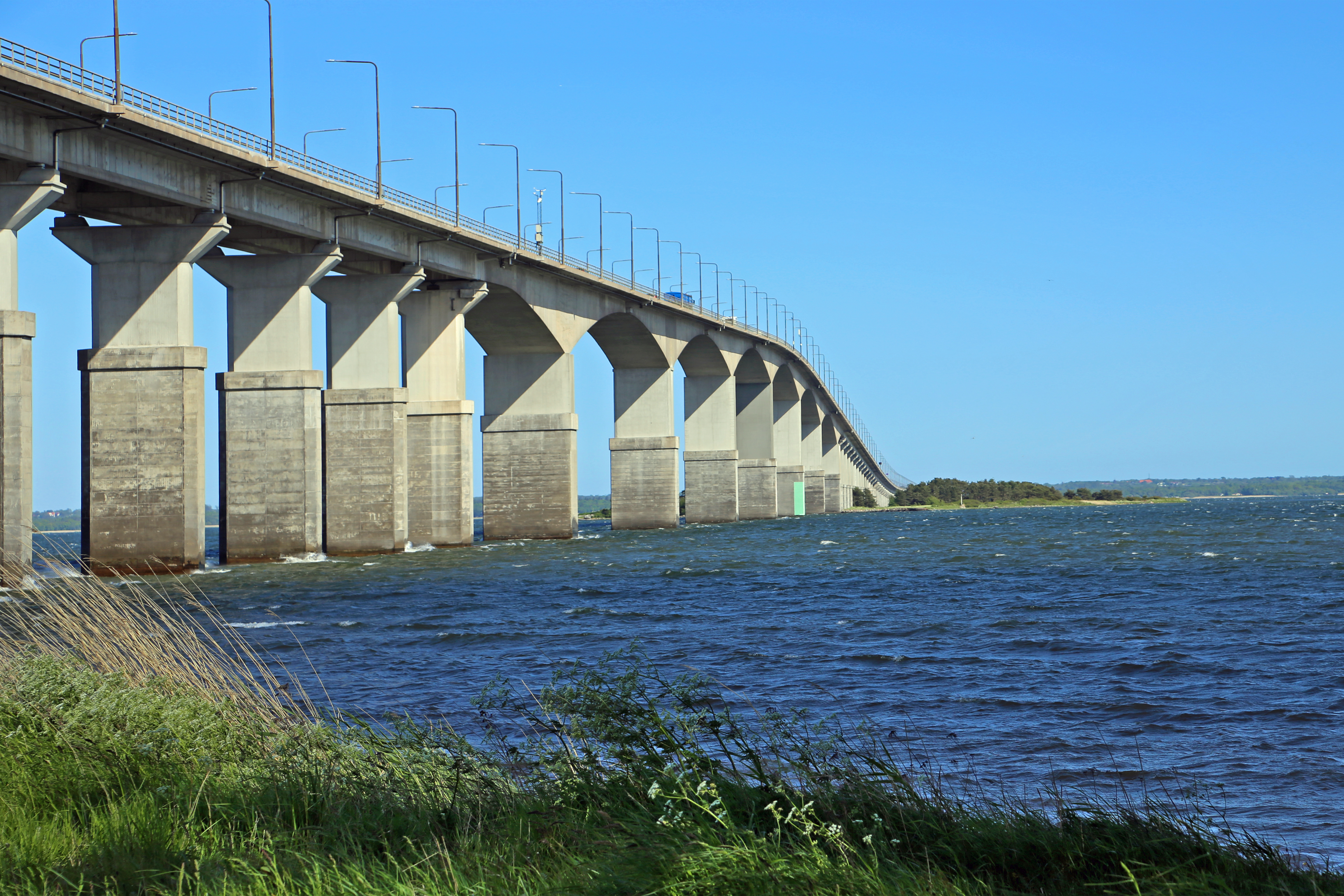
- The Öland bridge spans the Kalmar Strait

- Location within Sweden
- Coordinates: 56°43′56.60″N 16°26′57.41″E
- Type: strait
- Basin countries: Sweden
- Max. length: 130 km (81 mi)
- Max. width: 25 km (16 mi)
- Min. width: 5 km (3.1 mi)

The Kalmar Strait (Swedish: Kalmarsund) is a strait in the Baltic Sea, located between the Swedish island of Öland and the province of Småland of the Swedish mainland. The strait is about 130 kilometres (81 mi) long and between 5 kilometres (3.1 mi) and 25 kilometres (16 mi) in width.

There is a road bridge across the strait, the Öland Bridge, opened in September 1972.

== Prehistory ==
The areas along the Kalmar Strait have a heritage of Neolithic and Bronze Age habitation. Moreover, Mesolithic people crossed the strait on an ice bridge in the early Holocene period as glaciers began to recede from Öland. A place where early Mesolithic settlement of the island of Öland occurred is Alby, whose people migrated across the Kalmar Strait approximately 6000 BC. They established one of the oldest known Mesolithic villages in Northern Europe.
