= Öland County =

County in Sweden between 1819 and 1826

Coordinates: 56°44′N 16°40′E

Öland County Ölands län
- County of Sweden
- 1819–1826
- Flag
- Capital: Borgholm
- Government
- Governor
  - 1819–1821: Axel Adlersparre
  - 1821–1826: Ulrik Gustaf Lindencrona
- History
  - Established: 1819
  - Disestablished: 1826
Preceded by	Succeeded by
Kalmar County	Kalmar County

Öland County, or Ölands län, was a county of Sweden, between 1819 and 1826. It consisted of the island of Öland, designating the historical province of Öland as its own county. A Governor resided briefly at Borgholm, but the island is today part of the Kalmar County.

Some important historical sites in Öland County are: Borgholm Castle, Halltorps Estate, Eketorp fortress and the Gettlinge Gravefield. Much of Öland County's present day landscape known as the Stora Alvaret has been designated as a World Heritage Site.

== Governors ==
- Axel Adlersparre (1819–1821)
- Ulrik Gustaf Lindencrona (1821–1826)

== See also ==
- List of governors of Kalmar County
- County Governors of Sweden
