= Gettlinge =

Village in Mörbylånga Municipality, Sweden

Coordinates: 56°23′N 16°26′E

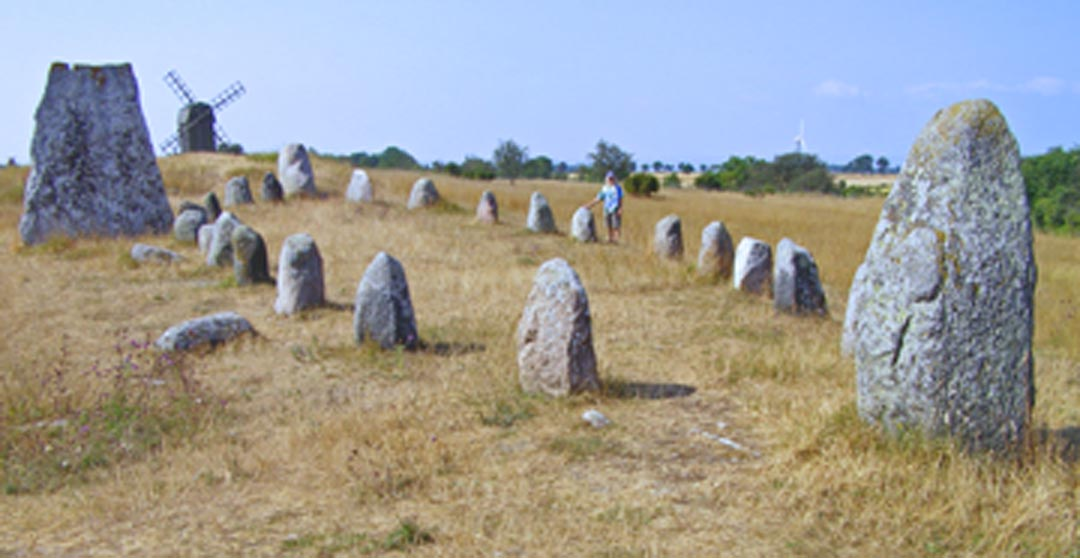
Viking stone ship at Gettlinge, Öland, Sweden.

Gettlinge is a village in the southwest portion of the island of Öland, Sweden. It is known for its impressive Viking stone ship burial ground. Gettlinge is situated on the western fringe of the Stora Alvaret, a World Heritage Site designated by UNESCO. The site is readily visible from the perimeter highway, Route 136. Gettlinge, as most prehistoric burial sites on Öland, is established on the low-lying ridge, described by Hogan as a geological formation of thickened soil in this alvar region of otherwise extremely thin soil mantle. This ridge was one of the few places on the southern part of the island that had sufficient soil depth for creation of burial mounds.

Situated at the fringe of the Stora Alvaret, the Gettlinge site and environs contains a number of rare and endangered species of both plants and animals, but most of these species are seasonally blooming wildflowers that flower in the late spring and summer. Beneath the soil layer where burials are placed is an extensive limestone formation, which is the source of most of the local building materials, which has supported drystone construction since medieval times. The standing stones of the Viking ship itself are granite, which moraine materials were pushed here from the mainland by ice age glaciers.

== Geology ==
At Gettlinge as for much of the island of Öland, bedrock layers are primarily Ordovician limestone that dates to at least 600 million years ago. Most of the limited supply of topsoil was created from glacial grinding of the limestone bedrock, which action created the nearly flat alvar formation. It was the end of the last ice age which led to uplift, creating the landform that is now the island of Öland.

The village of Gettlinge, as well as the precursor civilizations from Stone Age to medieval time, is primarily developed on a narrow low-lying ridge running north/south parallel to the Baltic coast. This ridge is the only place (except for beach sands) along the southwestern coast that soil extends more than the two centimeter maximum of the Stora Alvaret. The ridge was formed by wave action during the post-Ice Age uplift. Therefore, this thicker soil layer provided the only hospitable place for building foundations, burial grounds and agriculture.

== History ==
The earliest settlers in Öland built early Stone Age wooden huts; the best examples of such excavated prehistoric dwellings are found a few miles to the east present village of Alby. Archaeological excavations conducted over a period of years in the latter 1900s have revealed evidence of bear, marten, seal and porpoise, but also elucidate Mesolithic hunting and gathering technologies through discovery of bone spears, elk antler harpoons and flint. These earliest inhabitants would have crossed the Kalmar Strait from the mainland toward the end of the last ice age, before the glacial cap had fully melted, and thus provided an ice bridge. The settlements of the Stone Age are key resources on Öland that led to the UNESCO designation of the Stora Alvaret as a World Heritage Site.

The principal evidence of life in the Gettlinge area from 1000 BC to 1000 AD is derived from the gravefields themselves. The Gettlinge Gravfeld is situated near the coast highway and contains some Bronze Age barrows as well as the more prominent stone ship burials, making it one of the largest gravefields on Öland. These burials span the late Bronze Age, Iron Age and Viking Age. Some of the individual standing stones are thought to predate the Viking era. Numerous artifacts have been recovered from gravefields elsewhere on Öland, including bronze chains and a bone needle case.

Viking graves have also been found at the Hulterstad Gravefield as well as the extensive Strandvalle Gravfeld, both on Oland. These findings imply that Gettlinge was a link within a chain of Viking settlements concentrated on the southern coasts of Öland, although most Viking settlements were actually found on the southeast of Öland having better access to the open sea.

== Ecology ==
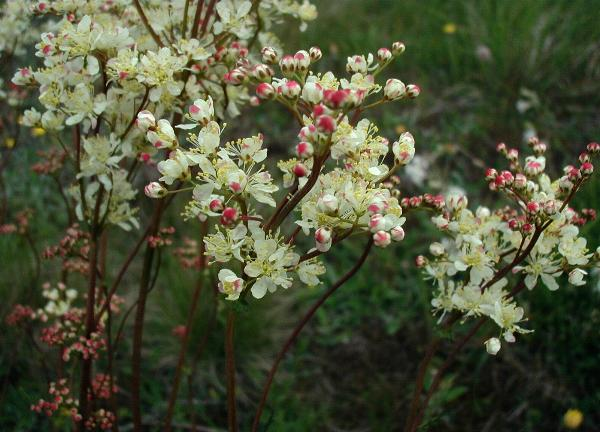
Filipendula vulgaris (Dropwort) plant which is found on the Stora Alvaret.

The first scientific study of the biota of the Stora Alvaret occurred in the year 1741 with the visit of Linnaeus to Öland. Linnaeus described this unusual ecosystem: "It is noteworthy how some plants are able to thrive on the driest and most barren places of the alvar". Some relict species from the glacial age are among the flora palette of the Stora Alvaret. A wide variety of wildflowers and other plants are found on the limestone pavement ecosystem. Some of the species found include stonecrop, dropwort, Artemisia Oelandica (endemic to Öland), Common spotted orchid and kidney vetch. Most of these wildflowers bloom from May to July.

Numerous grasses are found on this alvar including Meadow Oat-grass and Sheep's Fescue; as would be expected from the occurrence of orchids, many fungi grow on the Stora Alvaret such as Hygrocybe persistens and Lepiota alba. The alvar here is known for its severely dry conditions, evidenced by the dried appearance of ground cover and grasses in the upper right photo.

== See also ==
- Alby People
- Eketorp
- Viking
