= Post-glacial rebound =

Rise of land masses after glacial period

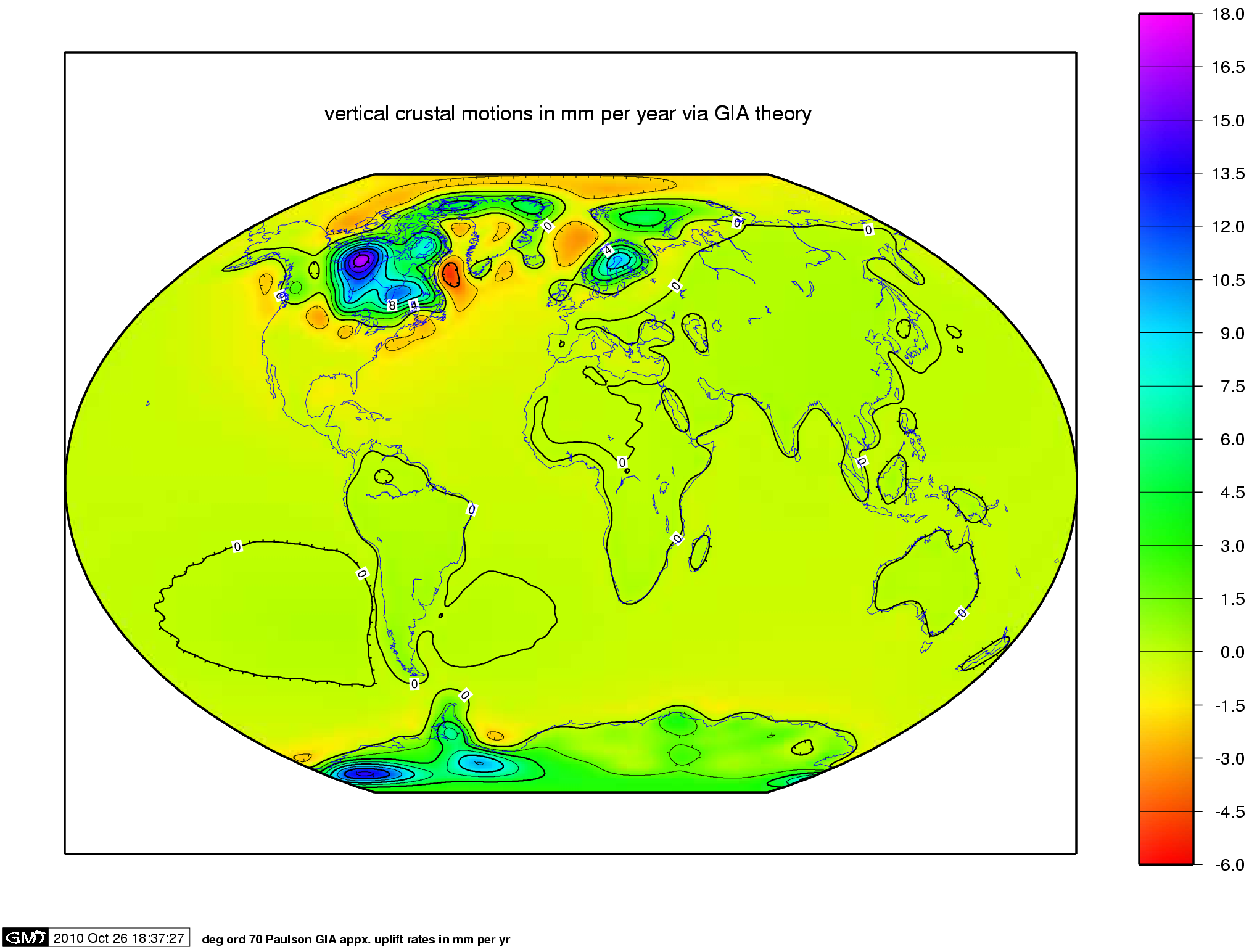
A model of present-day mass change due to post-glacial rebound and the reloading of the ocean basins with seawater. Blue and purple areas indicate rising due to the removal of the ice sheets. Yellow and red areas indicate falling as mantle material moved away from these areas in order to supply the rising areas, and because of the collapse of the forebulges around the ice sheets.

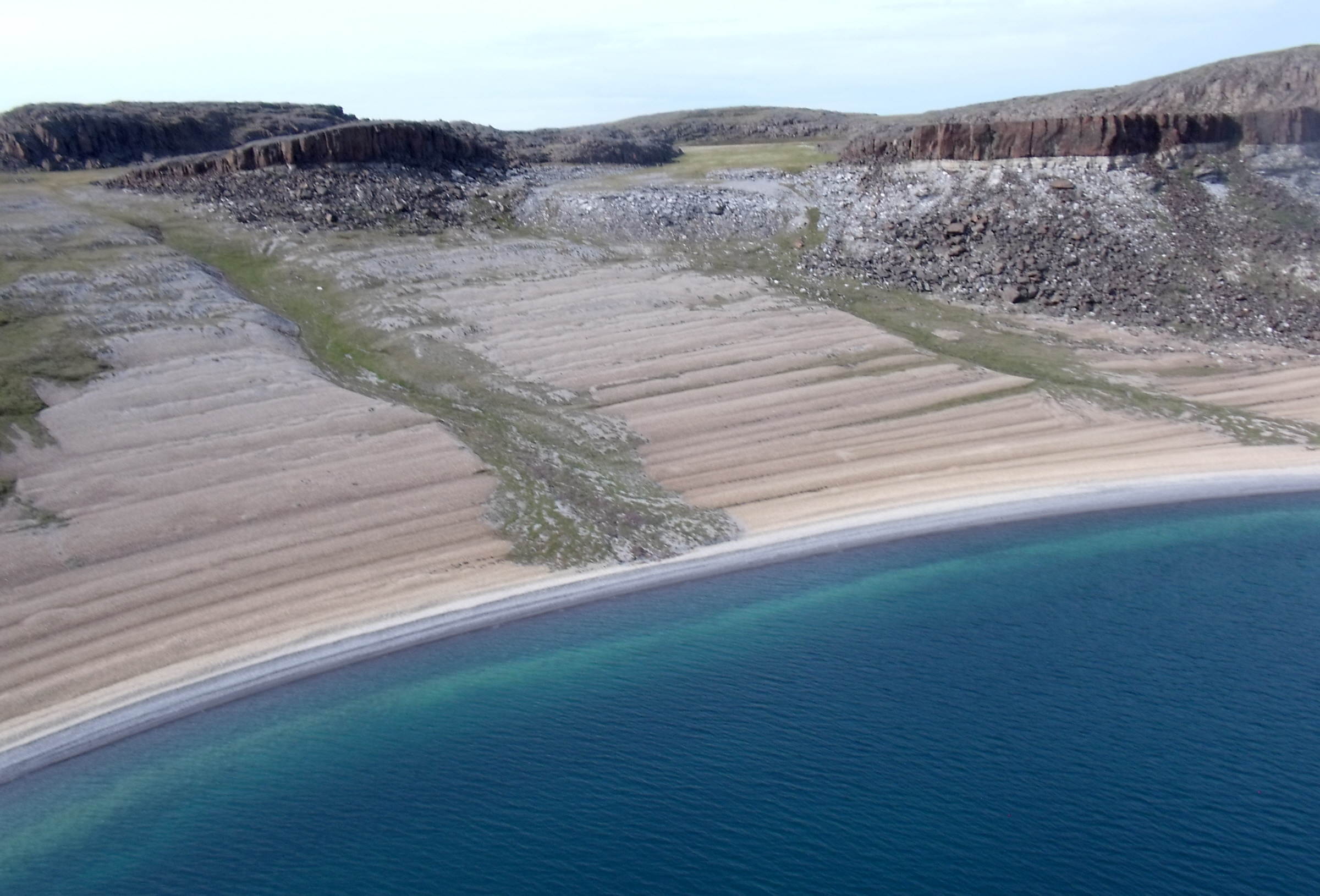
This layered beach at Bathurst Inlet, Nunavut is an example of post-glacial rebound after the last Ice Age. Little to no tide helped to form its layer-cake look. Isostatic rebound is still underway here.

Post-glacial rebound (also called isostatic rebound or crustal rebound) is the rise of land masses after the removal of the huge weight of ice sheets during the last glacial period, which had caused isostatic depression. Post-glacial rebound and isostatic depression are phases of glacial isostasy (glacial isostatic adjustment, glacioisostasy), the deformation of the Earth's crust in response to changes in ice mass distribution. The direct raising effects of post-glacial rebound are readily apparent in parts of Northern Eurasia, Northern America, Patagonia, and Antarctica. However, through the processes of ocean siphoning and continental levering, the effects of post-glacial rebound on sea level are felt globally far from the locations of current and former ice sheets.

== Overview ==
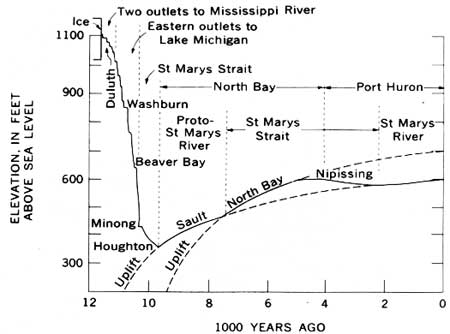
Changes in the elevation of Lake Superior due to glaciation and post-glacial rebound

During the last glacial period, much of northern Europe, Asia, North America, Greenland and Antarctica were covered by ice sheets, which reached up to three kilometres thick during the Last Glacial Maximum about 20,000 years ago. The enormous weight of this ice caused the surface of the Earth's crust to deform and warp downward, forcing the viscoelastic mantle material to flow away from the loaded region. At the end of each glacial period when the glaciers retreated, the removal of this weight led to slow (and still ongoing) uplift or rebound of the land and the return flow of mantle material back under the deglaciated area. Due to the extreme viscosity of the mantle, it will take many thousands of years for the land to reach an equilibrium level.

The uplift has taken place in two distinct stages. The initial uplift following deglaciation was almost immediate due to the elastic response of the crust as the ice load was removed. After this elastic phase, uplift proceeded by slow viscous flow at an exponentially decreasing rate. Today, typical uplift rates are of the order of 1 cm/year or less. In northern Europe, this is clearly shown by the GPS data obtained by the BIFROST GPS network; for example in Finland, the total area of the country is growing by about seven square kilometers per year. Studies suggest that rebound will continue for at least another 10,000 years. The total uplift from the end of deglaciation depends on the local ice load and could be several hundred metres near the centre of rebound.

Recently, the term "post-glacial rebound" is gradually being replaced by the term "glacial isostatic adjustment". This is in recognition that the response of the Earth to glacial loading and unloading is not limited to the upward rebound movement, but also involves downward land movement, horizontal crustal motion, changes in global sea levels and the Earth's gravity field, induced earthquakes, and changes in the Earth's rotation. Another alternate term is "glacial isostasy", because the uplift near the centre of rebound is due to the tendency towards the restoration of isostatic equilibrium (as in the case of isostasy of mountains). Unfortunately, that term gives the wrong impression that isostatic equilibrium is somehow reached, so by appending "adjustment" at the end, the motion of restoration is emphasized.

== Effects ==
Post-glacial rebound produces measurable effects on vertical crustal motion, global sea levels, horizontal crustal motion, gravity field, Earth's rotation, crustal stress, and earthquakes. Studies of glacial rebound give us information about the flow law of mantle rocks, which is important to the study of mantle convection, plate tectonics and the thermal evolution of the Earth. It also gives insight into past ice sheet history, which is important to glaciology, paleoclimate, and changes in global sea level. Understanding postglacial rebound is also important to our ability to monitor recent global change.

=== Vertical crustal motion ===
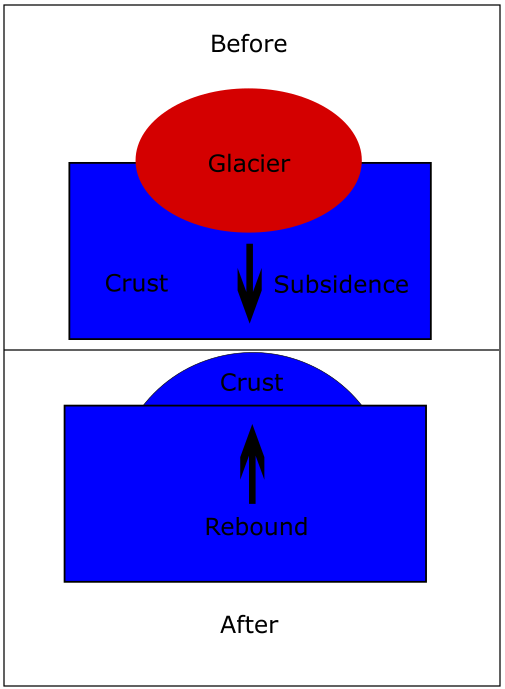
The elastic behavior of the lithosphere and mantle, illustrating subsidence of the crust with respect to landscape properties as a result of the downward force of a glacier ("Before"), and the effects that melting and glacial retreat have on the rebound of the mantle and lithosphere in ("After").

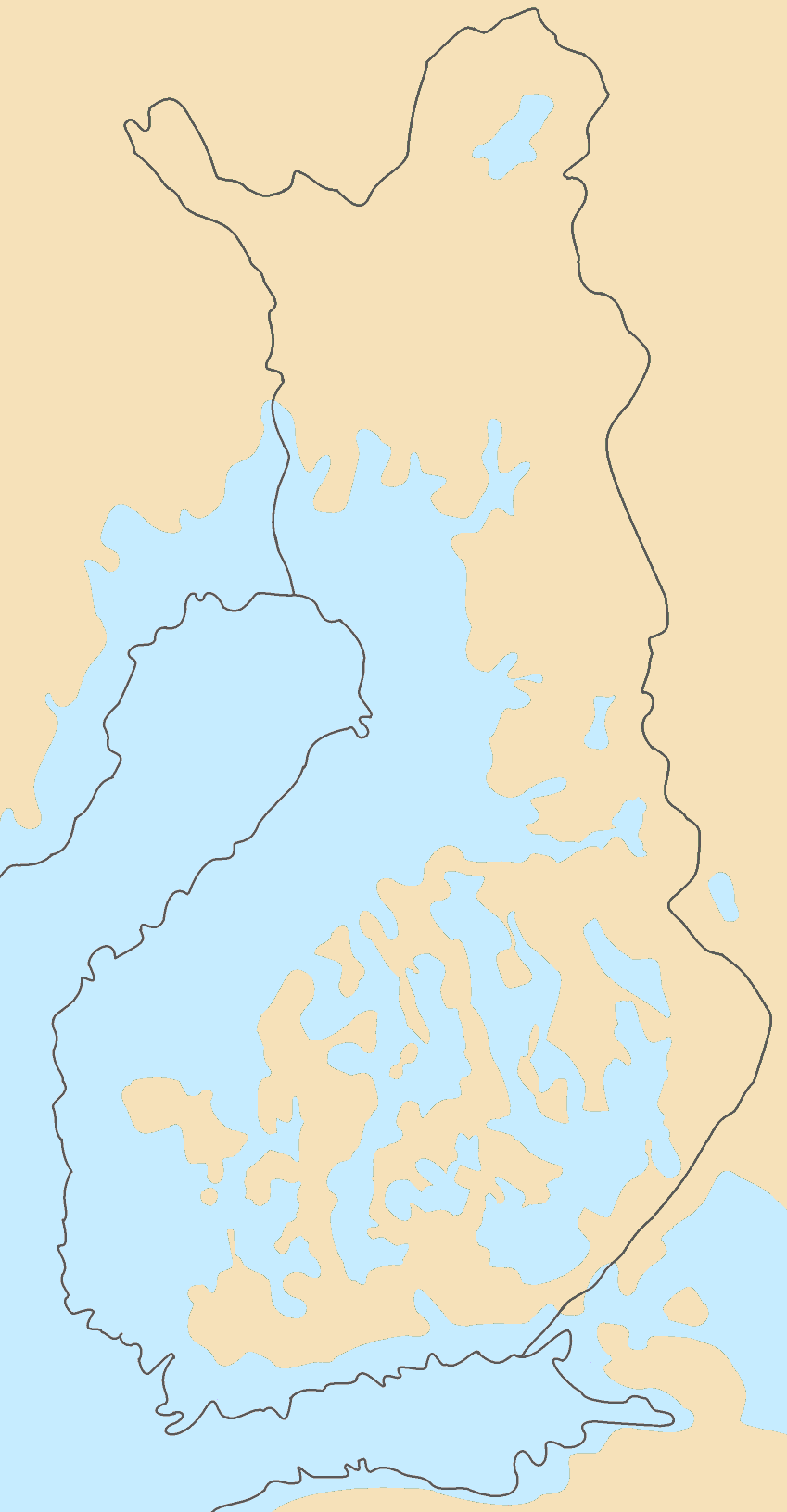
Much of modern Finland is former seabed or archipelago: illustrated are sea levels immediately after the last ice age.

Erratic boulders, U-shaped valleys, drumlins, eskers, kettle lakes, bedrock striations are among the common signatures of the Ice Age. In addition, post-glacial rebound has caused numerous significant changes to coastlines and landscapes over the last several thousand years, and the effects continue to be significant.

In Sweden, Lake Mälaren was formerly an arm of the Baltic Sea, but uplift eventually cut it off and led to its becoming a freshwater lake in about the 12th century, at the time when Stockholm was founded at its outlet. Marine seashells found in Lake Ontario sediments imply a similar event in prehistoric times. Other pronounced effects can be seen on the island of Öland, Sweden, which has little topographic relief due to the presence of the very level Stora Alvaret. The rising land has caused the Iron Age settlement area to recede from the Baltic Sea, making the present day villages on the west coast set back unexpectedly far from the shore. These effects are quite dramatic at the village of Alby, for example, where the Iron Age inhabitants were known to subsist on substantial coastal fishing.

As a result of post-glacial rebound, the Gulf of Bothnia is predicted to eventually close up at Kvarken in more than 2,000 years. The Kvarken is a UNESCO World Natural Heritage Site, selected as a "type area" illustrating the effects of post-glacial rebound and the holocene glacial retreat.

In several other Nordic ports, like Tornio and Pori (formerly at Ulvila), the harbour has had to be relocated several times. Place names in the coastal regions also illustrate the rising land: there are inland places named 'island', 'skerry', 'rock', 'point' and 'sound'. For example, Oulunsalo "island of Oulujoki" is a peninsula, with inland names such as Koivukari "Birch Rock", Santaniemi "Sandy Cape", and Salmioja "the brook of the Sound". (Compare and .)

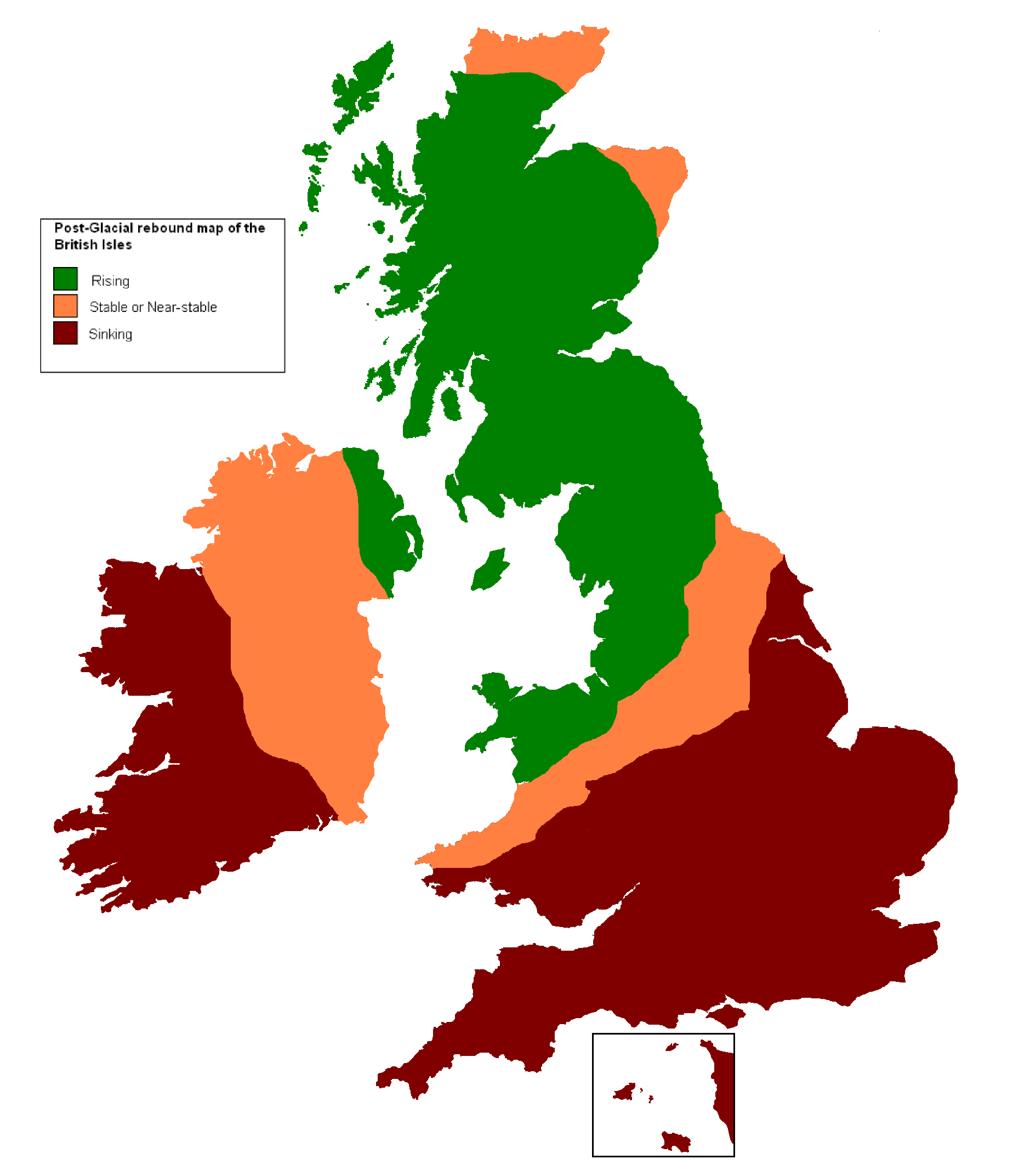
Map of Post Glacial Rebound effects upon the land-level of Ireland and the British Isles.

In Great Britain, glaciation affected Scotland but not southern England, and the post-glacial rebound of northern Great Britain (up to 10 cm per century) is causing a corresponding downward movement of the southern half of the island (up to 5 cm per century). This will eventually lead to an increased risk of floods in southern England and south-western Ireland.

Since the glacial isostatic adjustment process causes the land to move relative to the sea, ancient shorelines are found to lie above present day sea level in areas that were once glaciated. On the other hand, places in the peripheral bulge area which was uplifted during glaciation now begins to subside. Therefore, ancient beaches are found below present day sea level in the bulge area. The "relative sea level data", which consists of height and age measurements of the ancient beaches around the world, tells us that glacial isostatic adjustment proceeded at a higher rate near the end of deglaciation than today.

The present-day uplift motion in northern Europe is also monitored by a GPS network called BIFROST. Results of GPS data show a peak rate of about 11 mm/year in the north part of the Gulf of Bothnia, but this uplift rate decreases away and becomes negative outside the former ice margin.

In the near field outside the former ice margin, the land sinks relative to the sea. This is the case along the east coast of the United States, where ancient beaches are found submerged below present day sea level and Florida is expected to be submerged in the future. GPS data in North America also confirms that land uplift becomes subsidence outside the former ice margin.

=== Global sea levels ===
To form the ice sheets of the last Ice Age, water from the oceans evaporated, condensed as snow and was deposited as ice in high latitudes. Thus global sea level fell during glaciation.

The ice sheets at the last glacial maximum were so massive that global sea level fell by about 120 metres. Thus continental shelves were exposed and many islands became connected with the continents through dry land. This was the case between the British Isles and Europe (Doggerland), or between Taiwan, the Indonesian islands and Asia (Sundaland). A land bridge also existed between Siberia and Alaska that allowed the migration of people and animals during the last glacial maximum.

The fall in sea level also affects the circulation of ocean currents and thus has important impact on climate during the glacial maximum.

During deglaciation, the melted ice water returns to the oceans, thus sea level in the ocean increases again. However, geological records of sea level changes show that the redistribution of the melted ice water is not the same everywhere in the oceans. In other words, depending upon the location, the rise in sea level at a certain site may be more than that at another site. This is due to the gravitational attraction between the mass of the melted water and the other masses, such as remaining ice sheets, glaciers, water masses and mantle rocks and the changes in centrifugal potential due to Earth's variable rotation.

=== Horizontal crustal motion ===
Accompanying vertical motion is the horizontal motion of the crust. The BIFROST GPS network shows that the motion diverges from the centre of rebound. However, the largest horizontal velocity is found near the former ice margin.

The situation in North America is less certain; this is due to the sparse distribution of GPS stations in northern Canada, which is rather inaccessible.

=== Tilt ===
The combination of horizontal and vertical motion changes the tilt of the surface. That is, locations farther north rise faster, an effect that becomes apparent in lakes. The bottoms of the lakes gradually tilt away from the direction of the former ice maximum, such that lake shores on the side of the maximum (typically north) recede and the opposite (southern) shores sink. This causes the formation of new rapids and rivers. For example, Lake Pielinen in Finland, which is large (90 x 30 km) and oriented perpendicularly to the former ice margin, originally drained through an outlet in the middle of the lake near Nunnanlahti to Lake Höytiäinen. The change of tilt caused Pielinen to burst through the Uimaharju esker at the southwestern end of the lake, creating a new river (Pielisjoki) that runs to the sea via Lake Pyhäselkä to Lake Saimaa. The effects are similar to that concerning seashores, but occur above sea level. Tilting of land will also affect the flow of water in lakes and rivers in the future, and thus is important for water resource management planning.

In Sweden Lake Sommen's outlet in the northwest has a rebound of 2.36 mm/a while in the eastern Svanaviken it is 2.05 mm/a. This means the lake is being slowly tilted and the southeastern shores drowned.

=== Gravity field ===
Ice, water, and mantle rocks have mass, and as they move around, they exert a gravitational pull on other masses towards them. Thus, the gravity field, which is sensitive to all mass on the surface and within the Earth, is affected by the redistribution of ice/melted water on the surface of the Earth and the flow of mantle rocks within.

Today, more than 6000 years after the last deglaciation terminated, the flow of mantle material back to the glaciated area causes the overall shape of the Earth to become less oblate. This change in the topography of Earth's surface affects the long-wavelength components of the gravity field.

The changing gravity field can be detected by repeated land measurements with absolute gravimeters and recently by the GRACE satellite mission. The change in long-wavelength components of Earth's gravity field also perturbs the orbital motion of satellites and has been detected by LAGEOS satellite motion.

=== Vertical datum ===
The vertical datum is a reference surface for altitude measurement and plays vital roles in many human activities, including land surveying and construction of buildings and bridges. Since postglacial rebound continuously deforms the crustal surface and the gravitational field, the vertical datum needs to be redefined repeatedly through time.

=== State of stress, intraplate earthquakes and volcanism ===
According to the theory of plate tectonics, plate-plate interaction results in earthquakes near plate boundaries. However, large earthquakes are found in intraplate environments like eastern Canada (up to M7) and northern Europe (up to M5) which are far away from present-day plate boundaries. An important intraplate earthquake was the magnitude 8 New Madrid earthquake that occurred in mid-continental US in the year 1811.

Glacial loads provided more than 30 MPa of vertical stress in northern Canada and more than 20 MPa in northern Europe during glacial maximum. This vertical stress is supported by the mantle and the flexure of the lithosphere. Since the mantle and the lithosphere continuously respond to the changing ice and water loads, the state of stress at any location continuously changes in time. The changes in the orientation of the state of stress is recorded in the postglacial faults in southeastern Canada. When the postglacial faults formed at the end of deglaciation 9000 years ago, the horizontal principal stress orientation was almost perpendicular to the former ice margin, but today the orientation is in the northeast–southwest, along the direction of seafloor spreading at the Mid-Atlantic Ridge. This shows that the stress due to postglacial rebound had played an important role at deglacial time, but has gradually relaxed so that tectonic stress has become more dominant today.

According to the Mohr–Coulomb theory of rock failure, large glacial loads generally suppress earthquakes, but rapid deglaciation promotes earthquakes. According to Wu & Hasagawa, the rebound stress that is available to trigger earthquakes today is of the order of 1 MPa. This stress level is not large enough to rupture intact rocks but is large enough to reactivate pre-existing faults that are close to failure. Thus, both postglacial rebound and past tectonics play important roles in today's intraplate earthquakes in eastern Canada and southeast US. Generally postglacial rebound stress could have triggered the intraplate earthquakes in eastern Canada and may have played some role in triggering earthquakes in the eastern US including the New Madrid earthquakes of 1811. The situation in northern Europe today is complicated by the current tectonic activities nearby and by coastal loading and weakening.

Increasing pressure due to the weight of the ice during glaciation may have suppressed melt generation and volcanic activities below Iceland and Greenland. On the other hand, decreasing pressure due to deglaciation can increase the melt production and volcanic activities by 20-30 times.

== Recent global warming ==
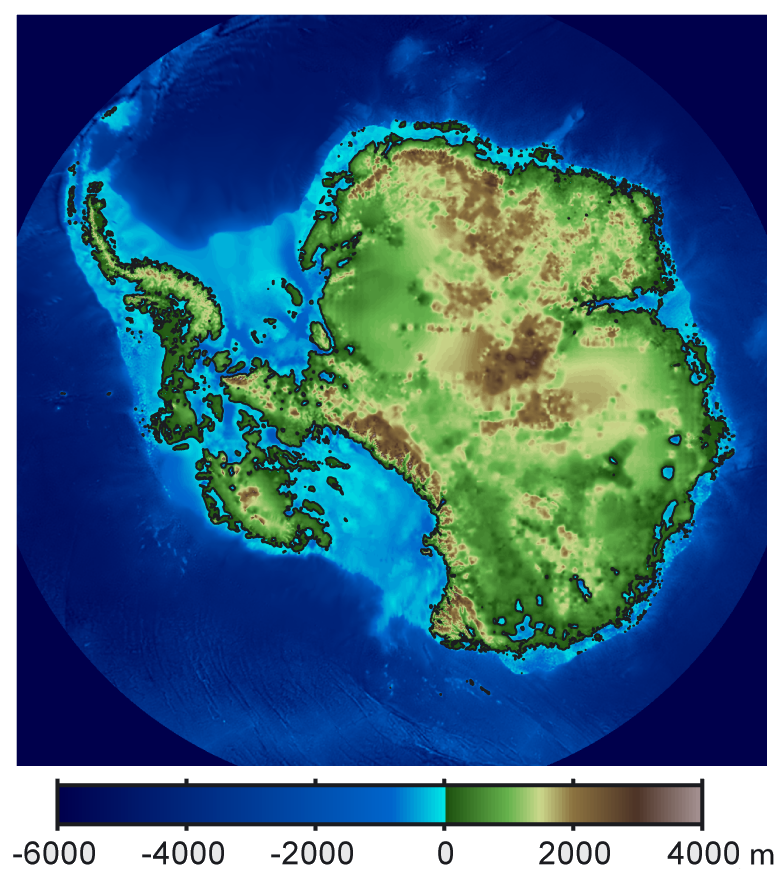
Deglaciated Antarctic accounting for both isostatic rebound and sea level rise

Recent global warming has caused mountain glaciers and the ice sheets in Greenland and Antarctica to melt and global sea level to rise. Therefore, monitoring sea level rise and the mass balance of ice sheets and glaciers allows people to understand more about global warming.

Recent rise in sea levels has been monitored by tide gauges and satellite altimetry (e.g. TOPEX/Poseidon). As well as the addition of melted ice water from glaciers and ice sheets, recent sea level changes are effected by the thermal expansion of sea water due to global warming, sea level change due to deglaciation of the last glacial maximum (postglacial sea level change), deformation of the land and ocean floor and other factors. Thus, to understand global warming from sea level change, one must be able to separate all these factors, especially postglacial rebound, since it is one of the leading factors.

Mass changes of ice sheets can be monitored by measuring changes in the ice surface height, the deformation of the ground below and the changes in the gravity field over the ice sheet. Thus ICESat, GPS and GRACE satellite mission are useful for such purpose. However, glacial isostatic adjustment of the ice sheets affect ground deformation and the gravity field today. Thus understanding glacial isostatic adjustment is important in monitoring recent global warming.

One of the possible impacts of global warming-triggered rebound may be more volcanic activity in previously ice-capped areas such as Iceland and Greenland. It may also trigger intraplate earthquakes near the ice margins of Greenland and Antarctica. Unusually rapid (up to 4.1 cm/year) present glacial isostatic rebound due to recent ice mass losses in the Amundsen Sea embayment region of Antarctica coupled with low regional mantle viscosity is predicted to provide a modest stabilizing influence on marine ice sheet instability in West Antarctica, but likely not to a sufficient degree to arrest it.

== Applications ==
The speed and amount of postglacial rebound is determined by two factors: the viscosity or rheology (i.e., the flow) of the mantle, and the ice loading and unloading histories on the surface of Earth.

The viscosity of the mantle is important in understanding mantle convection, plate tectonics, the dynamical processes in Earth, and the thermal state and thermal evolution of Earth. However viscosity is difficult to observe because creep experiments of mantle rocks at natural strain rates would take thousands of years to observe and the ambient temperature and pressure conditions are not easy to attain for a long enough time. Thus, the observations of postglacial rebound provide a natural experiment to measure mantle rheology. Modelling of glacial isostatic adjustment addresses the question of how viscosity changes in the radial and lateral directions and whether the flow law is linear, nonlinear, or composite rheology. Mantle viscosity may additionally be estimated using seismic tomography, where seismic velocity is used as a proxy observable.

Ice thickness histories are useful in the study of paleoclimatology, glaciology and paleo-oceanography. Ice thickness histories are traditionally deduced from the three types of information: First, the sea level data at stable sites far away from the centers of deglaciation give an estimate of how much water entered the oceans or equivalently how much ice was locked up at glacial maximum. Secondly, the location and dates of terminal moraines tell us the areal extent and retreat of past ice sheets. Physics of glaciers gives us the theoretical profile of ice sheets at equilibrium, it also says that the thickness and horizontal extent of equilibrium ice sheets are closely related to the basal condition of the ice sheets. Thus the volume of ice locked up is proportional to their instantaneous area. Finally, the heights of ancient beaches in the sea level data and observed land uplift rates (e.g. from GPS or VLBI) can be used to constrain local ice thickness. A popular ice model deduced this way is the ICE5G model. Because the response of the Earth to changes in ice height is slow, it cannot record rapid fluctuation or surges of ice sheets, thus the ice sheet profiles deduced this way only gives the "average height" over a thousand years or so.

Glacial isostatic adjustment also plays an important role in understanding recent global warming and climate change.

== Discovery ==
Before the eighteenth century, it was thought, in Sweden, that sea levels were falling. On the initiative of Anders Celsius a number of marks were made in rock on different locations along the Swedish coast. In 1765 it was possible to conclude that it was not a lowering of sea levels but an uneven rise of land.

In HMS Racehorse's northern 1773 voyage log, published 1775, Constantine Phipps suggested that the small, low island of Moffen in the Svalbard archipelago (at that time called "Spitsbergen" after its main island) might not have previously existed, as in his charts no earlier mariners had ever reported it despite otherwise meticulous records. While Moffen had, in fact, been labelled on a 1655 map by Hendrick Doncker, I. Newbold Smith mentioned this as a remarkable comment as Phipps was a naval officer, "not a geologist nor on the other hand a mystic... he might have known Spitsbergen were rising. Otherwise, king and country would have branded him a kook" to have published such an extraordinary observation.

With rugged Svalbard, terraced shorelines would have been one indication. In the similarly rising northern Baltic, changing, expanding sea shores should have been a long-term feature known to major naval chart makers of the 1700's, and local trends might explain the statement as an example of a sea location where many common harbors were no longer able to be used by deep draft vessels yet without normal silting in places near rivers or shifting sand bars but instead often hard, bare rock important and commonly listed on maps as the dangers of grounding and difficulties in anchoring among these seabeds are well known. The most apparent situation is a common knowledge to military ship captains and with some degree in the similar merchant shipping fields for those areas.

In 1865 Thomas Jamieson came up with a theory that the rise of land was connected with the ice age that had been first discovered in 1837. The theory was accepted after investigations by Gerard De Geer of old shorelines in Scandinavia published in 1890.

== Legal implications ==
In areas where the rising of land is seen, it is necessary to define the exact limits of property. In Finland, the "new land" is legally the property of the owner of the water area, not any land owners on the shore. Therefore, if the owner of the land wishes to build a pier over the "new land", they need the permission of the owner of the (former) water area. The landowner of the shore may redeem the new land at market price. Usually the owner of the water area is the partition unit of the landowners of the shores, a collective holding corporation.

== Formulation: sea-level equation ==
The sea-level equation (SLE) is a linear integral equation that describes the sea-level variations associated with the PGR. The basic idea of the SLE dates back to 1888, when Woodward published his pioneering work on the form and position of mean sea level, and only later has been refined by Platzman and Farrell in the context of the study of the ocean tides. In the words of Wu and Peltier, the solution of the SLE yields the space– and time–dependent change of ocean bathymetry which is required to keep the gravitational potential of the sea surface constant for a specific deglaciation chronology and viscoelastic earth model. The SLE theory was then developed by other authors as Mitrovica & Peltier, Mitrovica et al. and Spada & Stocchi. In its simplest form, the SLE reads

$$S=N-U,$$

where $S$ is the sea–level change, $N$ is the sea surface variation as seen from Earth's center of mass, and $U$ is vertical displacement.

In a more explicit form the SLE can be written as follow:

$$S (\theta, \lambda, t) = \frac{\rho_i}{\gamma}  G_s \otimes_i I + \frac{\rho_w}{\gamma} G_s \otimes_o S + S^E - \frac{\rho_i}{\gamma}\overline{G_s \otimes_i I } - \frac{\rho_w}{\gamma}\overline{G_o \otimes_o S },$$

where $\theta$ is colatitude and $\lambda$ is longitude, $t$ is time, $\rho_i$ and $\rho_w$ are the densities of ice and water, respectively, $\gamma$ is the reference surface gravity, $G_s=G_s(h,k)$ is the sea–level Green's function (dependent upon the $h$ and $k$ viscoelastic load–deformation coefficients - LDCs), $I= I(\theta, \lambda, t)$ is the ice thickness variation, $S^E=S^E(t)$ represents the eustatic term (i.e. the ocean–averaged value of $S$), $\otimes_i$ and $\otimes_o$ denote spatio-temporal convolutions over the ice- and ocean-covered regions, and the overbar indicates an average over the surface of the oceans that ensures mass conservation.

== See also ==
- Holocene glacial retreat – Period of global deglaciation
- Raised beach, also known as marine terrace – Emergent coastal landform
- Physical impacts of climate change
- Stress (mechanics) – Physical quantity that expresses internal forces in a continuous material
- Isostatic depression – The opposite of isostatic rebound
