= Hulterstad =

Settlement in Mörbylånga Municipality, Sweden

Coordinates: 56°27′N 16°34′E

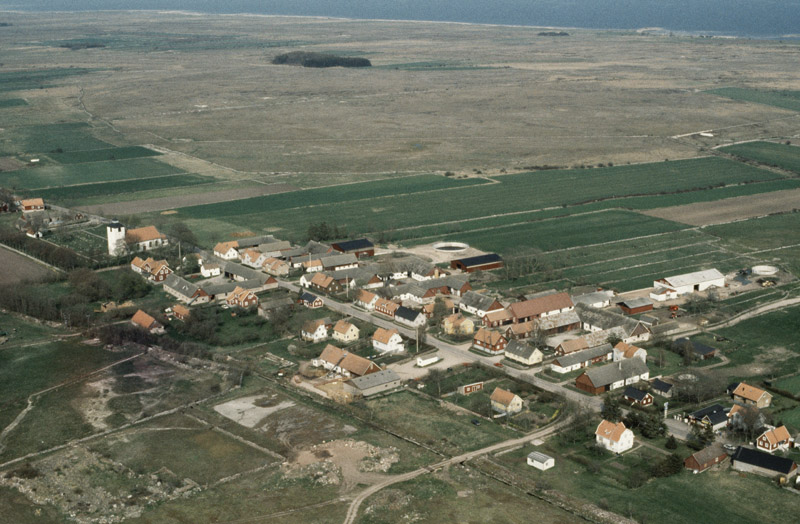
Hulterstad

Hulterstad is a small coastal town on the southeastern part of the island of Öland, Sweden. Hulterstad is situated at the eastern fringe of the Stora Alvaret, a limestone pavement habitat which hosts a diversity of rare plants and has been designated a World Heritage Site by UNESCO. Hulterstad is the municipal government center for this district and central records for centuries were kept at the Hulterstad Church. Significant gravefields and a Viking stone burial ship structure are located immediately south of Hulterstad. To the north is located the village of Alby, where a Mesolithic village of early human settlement has been found, and to the south is the Ottenby Nature Reserve. Across the alvar to the west is the village of Gettlinge.

== Notable people ==
- Anna Agnér (1896–1977) Swedish visual artist
