= Swedish county road 136 =

Road in Öland, Sweden

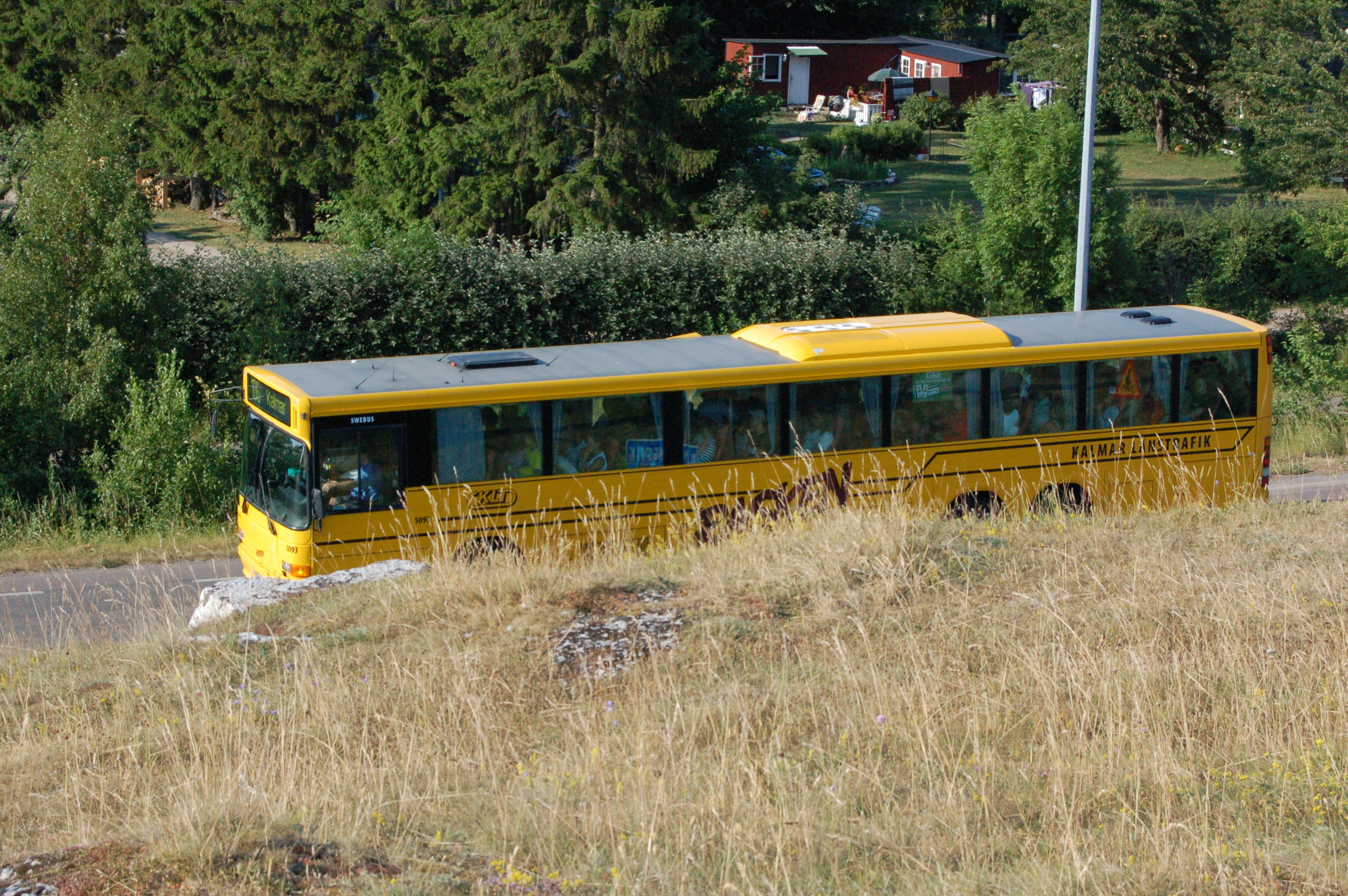
A bus on Route 136, outside Köpingsvik.

Swedish county road 136 (Swedish: Länsväg 136) is a county road on the island of Öland, Sweden. This facility is a paved two lane structure that runs along the west coast of the island from Ottenby in the south to Nabbelund in the north. This highway constitutes the majority of named highway coverage on the island. Route 136 connects to Route 137 somewhat east of the Öland bridge, which crosses the Kalmar Strait. Much of the island of Öland has been designated a world heritage site by UNESCO in the form of the Stora Alvaret nature reserve. This reserve is home to a vast number of rare and endangered species due to the presence of an enormous limestone barren, which is the largest such formation in Europe. Route 136 is virtually the only spinal link allowing vehicle access to all parts of the Stora Alvaret.

Sites accessed by Route 136 are the Gettlinge stone ship gravefield, Ottenby Nature Reserve and Halltorps Manor.

== Geology ==
Much of Route 136 is built directly over the alvar formation itself, which provides an excellent limestone base. However, the most interesting geological feature associated with Route 136 is a low ridge scarcely exceeding four meters in height which is particularly noticeable in the western perimeter of Öland. This ridge is an accumulation of soils from the combination of glacial accumulation and wave action of the ocean when ocean levels were effectively higher. The soil accumulation is an important feature, since soil depths elsewhere on the Stora Alvaret are minimal. The ridge historically was the center of human development since it was one of the few places that supported farming, structure foundations and burial sites. The historic perimeter road and most of the towns of Öland closely follow this natural ridge.

== See also ==
- Alby, Sweden
- Halltorps
- Stora Alvaret
