= Snow bridge =

Arc formed of snow across a crevasse

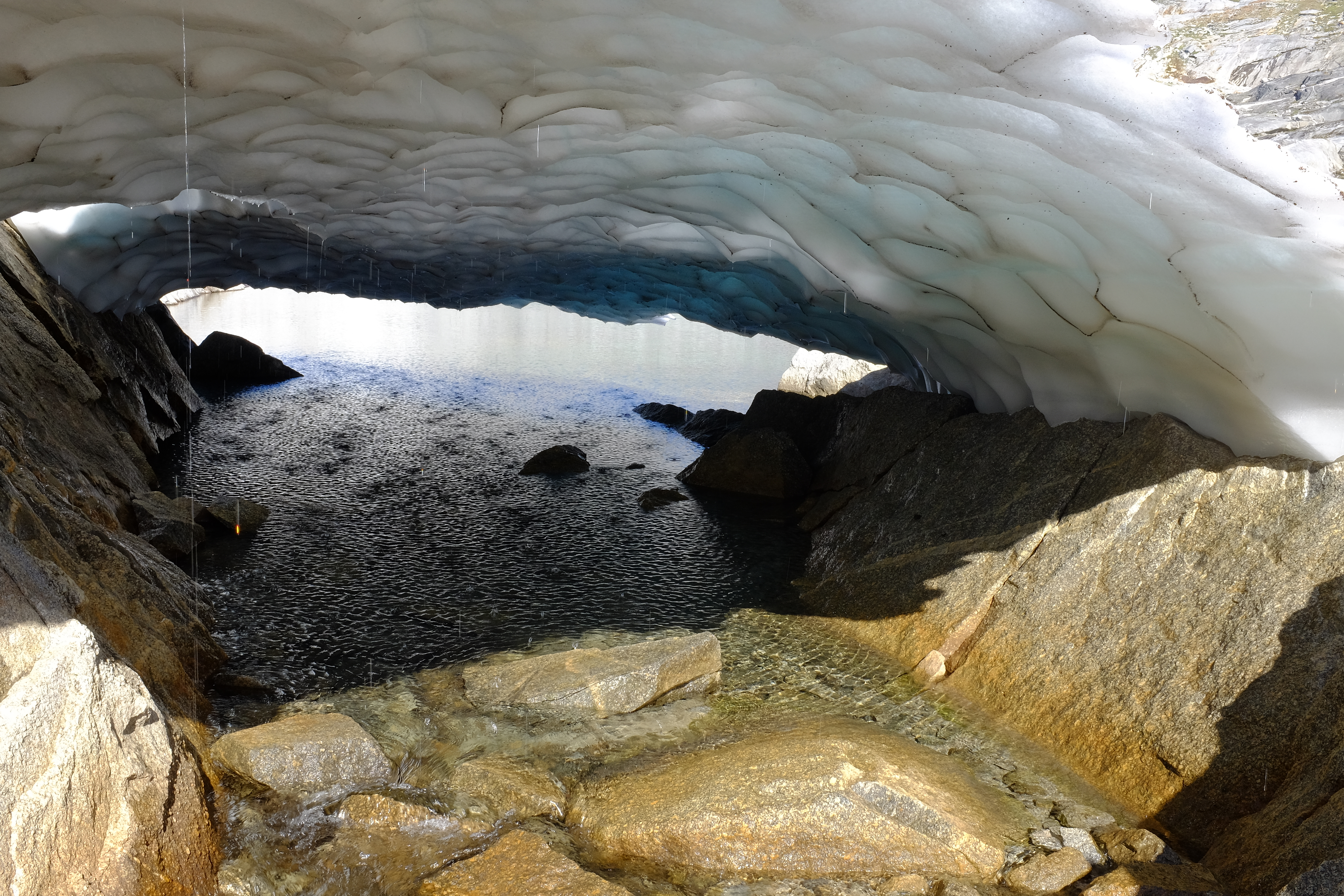
A snow bridge across a creek

A snow bridge is an arc formed by snow across a crevasse, a crack in rock, a creek, or some other opening in terrain. It is typically formed by snow drift, which first creates a cornice, which may then grow to reach the other side of the opening.

== Dangers ==
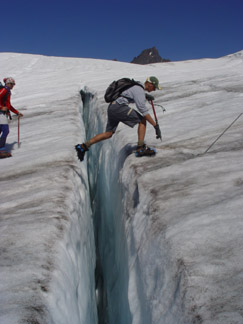
A snow bridge concealing a crevasse in the back

A snow bridge may completely cover the opening and thus present a danger by creating an illusion of an unbroken surface under which the opening is concealed by an unknown thickness of snow, possibly only a few centimetres.

Snow bridges may also form inside a crevasse, making it appear shallow.

A snow bridge is thicker and stronger at the edge of a crevasse; therefore, a fall through a bridge usually happens at some distance from the edge.

== See also ==
- Ice bridge
