= Alby, Öland =

Village in Öland, Sweden

Coordinates: 56°28′58″N 16°34′31″E

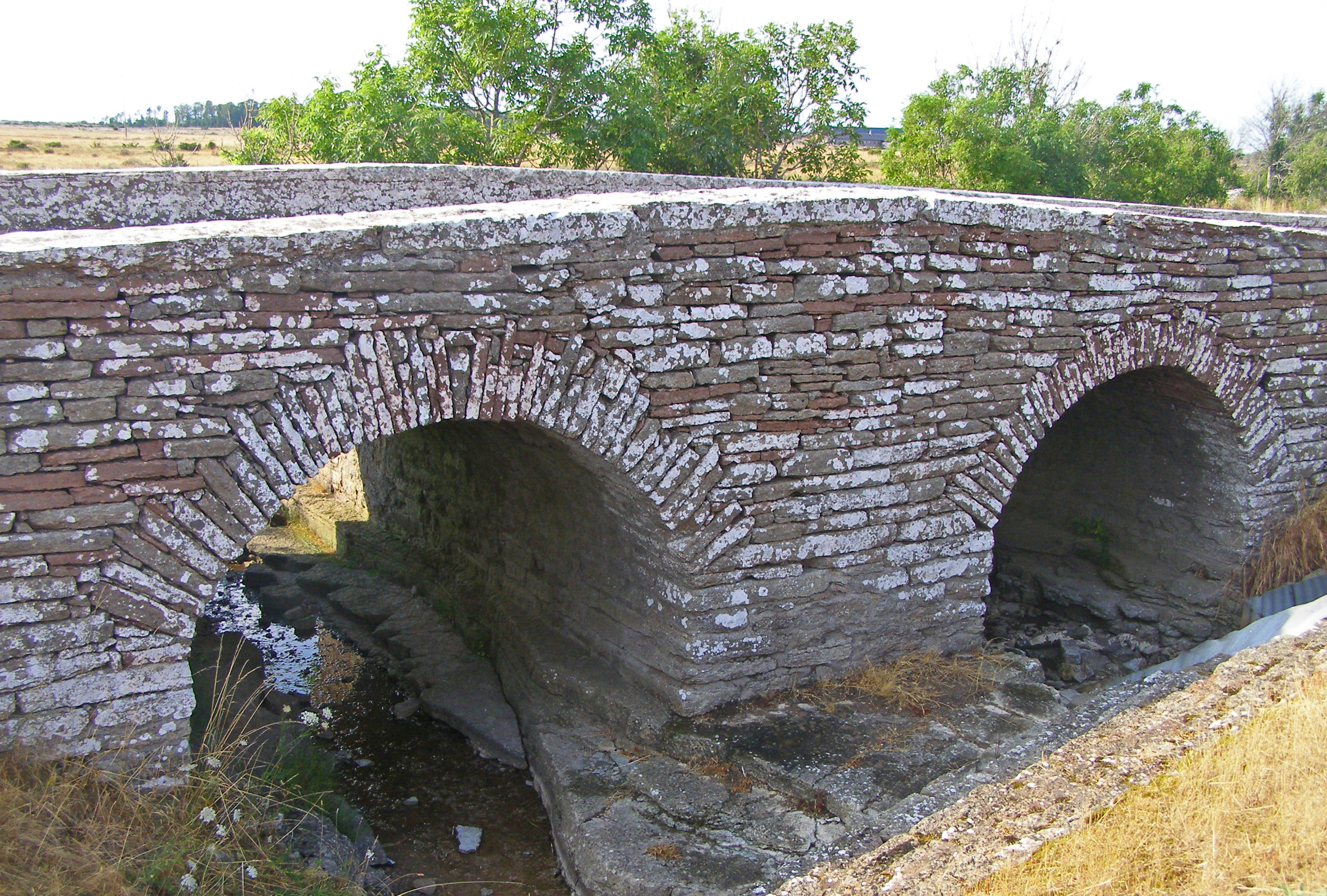
Medieval drystone bridge in Alby

Alby is a village on the Baltic Sea in the Hulterstad district at the western fringe of the Stora Alvaret on the island of Öland, Sweden.

Archaeological evidence indicates this settlement to have been one of the oldest on the island of Öland, with excavations, dating to the Paleolithic era, showing the presence of hunter-gatherers. The village prehistory dates to the Stone Age when settlers from the mainland migrated across the ice bridge connecting the island via the Kalmar Strait about 6000 to 7000 BC. These early inhabitants are known in the archaeological literature as the Alby People.

In the earliest times villagers subsisted by hunting, fishing and gathering, but by 4000 BC farming supplanted that lifestyle, and continued to be the primary livelihood until 2006. The village lies atop the low-lying north–south coastal ridge that defines the separation of the coastal plain from the Stora Alvaret. Alby is situated along the two-lane east coast highway, with the communities of Hulterstad and Triberga to the south; to the north lie the villages of Stagerstad and Stena.

Alby is a component of the Stora Alvaret, which has been designated as a World Heritage Site by UNESCO due to its extraordinary biodiversity and prehistory.

== Geography ==
Alby is bounded on the east by the Baltic Sea and on the west by the Stora Alvaret, an expansive limestone barren. Alby is situated on the southeastern coast of the island of Öland and is bisected by the two lane Sweden Route 136, which is the main perimeter highway of the island. Öland is Sweden's second largest island and is located in the Baltic Sea off of the southeast Swedish mainland. Further south on Highway 136 lie the villages of Triberga (one kilometer) and Hulterstad (three kilometers). The village of Stagerstad is found two kilometers to the north on the perimeter highway. The closest sizable city is Färjestaden, which is situated 25 kilometers to the northwest at the Öland Bridge landing on the Öland side.

Other vicinity landmarks are the ancient royal game reserve (now a nature reserve) at Ottenby, found at the southern tip of the island about 30 kilometers to the south and the Eketorp fortress, a restored Iron Age ringfort, lying 21 kilometers south.

== Geology ==
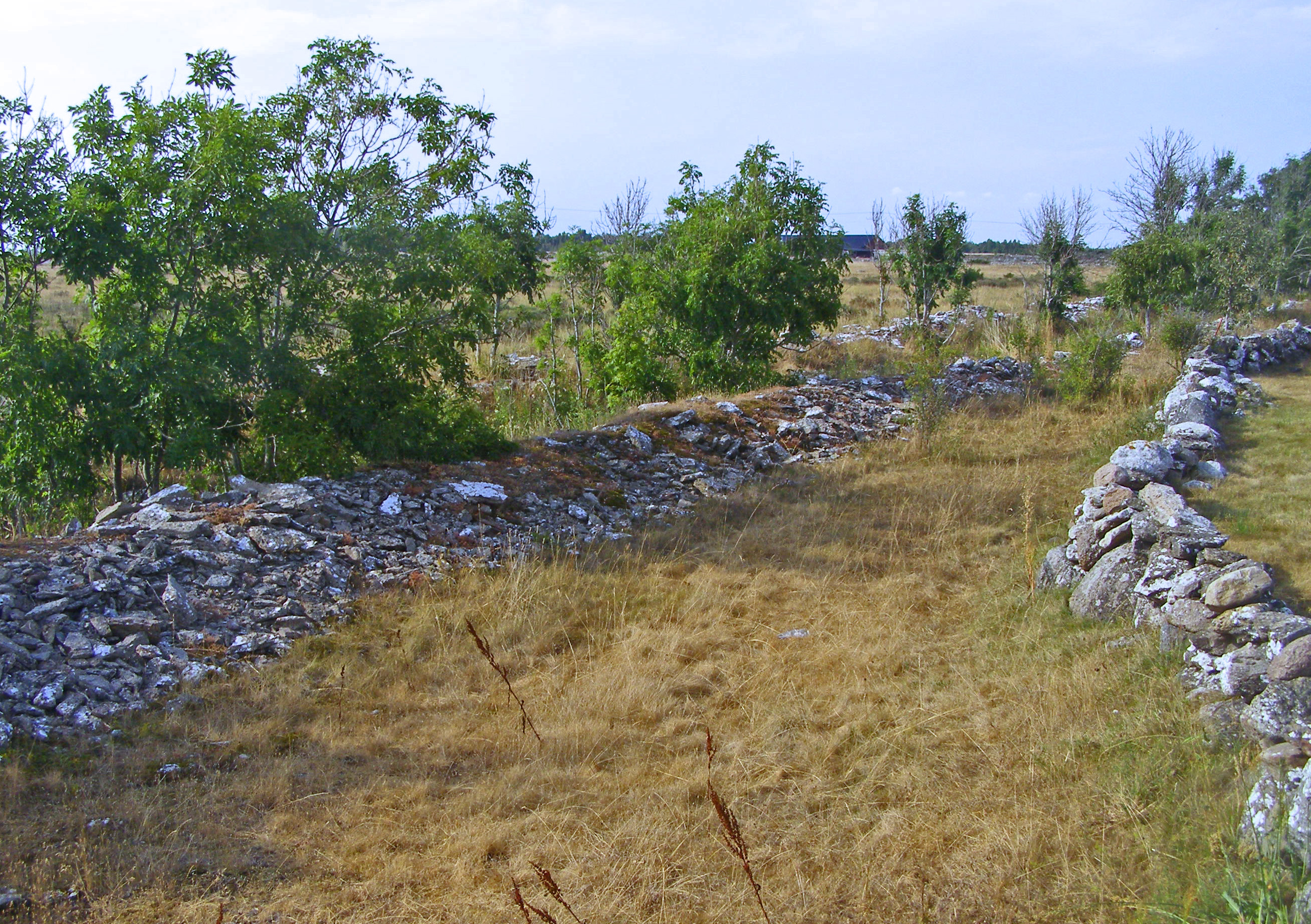
Drainage swale from the prehistoric Alby lagoon.

Bedrock layers are primarily Ordovician limestone that dates to at least 600 million years ago. Most of the limited supply of topsoil was created from glacial grinding of the limestone bedrock, which action created the nearly flat alvar formation. It was the end of the last ice age which led to uplift, creating the landform that is now the island of Öland.

The village of Alby, as well as the precursor civilizations from Stone Age to medieval time, is primarily developed on a narrow ridge running north–south parallel to the Baltic coast. This ridge is the only place (except for beach sands) along the eastern coast that soil extends more than the two centimeter maximum of the Stora Alvaret. The ridge was formed by wave action during the post-Ice Age uplift. Therefore, this thicker soil layer provided the only hospitable place for building foundations, burial grounds and agriculture.

== Earliest history ==
The earliest settlers built early Stone Age wooden huts at the fringe of a prehistoric lagoon at the northwest of the present Alby. Archaeological excavations conducted over a period of years in the latter 20th century have revealed evidence of bear, marten, seal and porpoise, but also elucidate mesolithic hunting and gathering technologies through discovery of bone spears, moose antler harpoons and flint. These earliest inhabitants would have crossed the Kalmar Strait from the mainland toward the end of the last ice age, before the glacial cap had fully melted, and thus provided an ice bridge. The settlers at Alby are referred to as the Alby People in the archaeological literature, and the Alby mesolithic village is one of the key resources that led to the UNESCO designation of the Stora Alvaret as a World Heritage Site.

== Bronze Age to Viking era ==
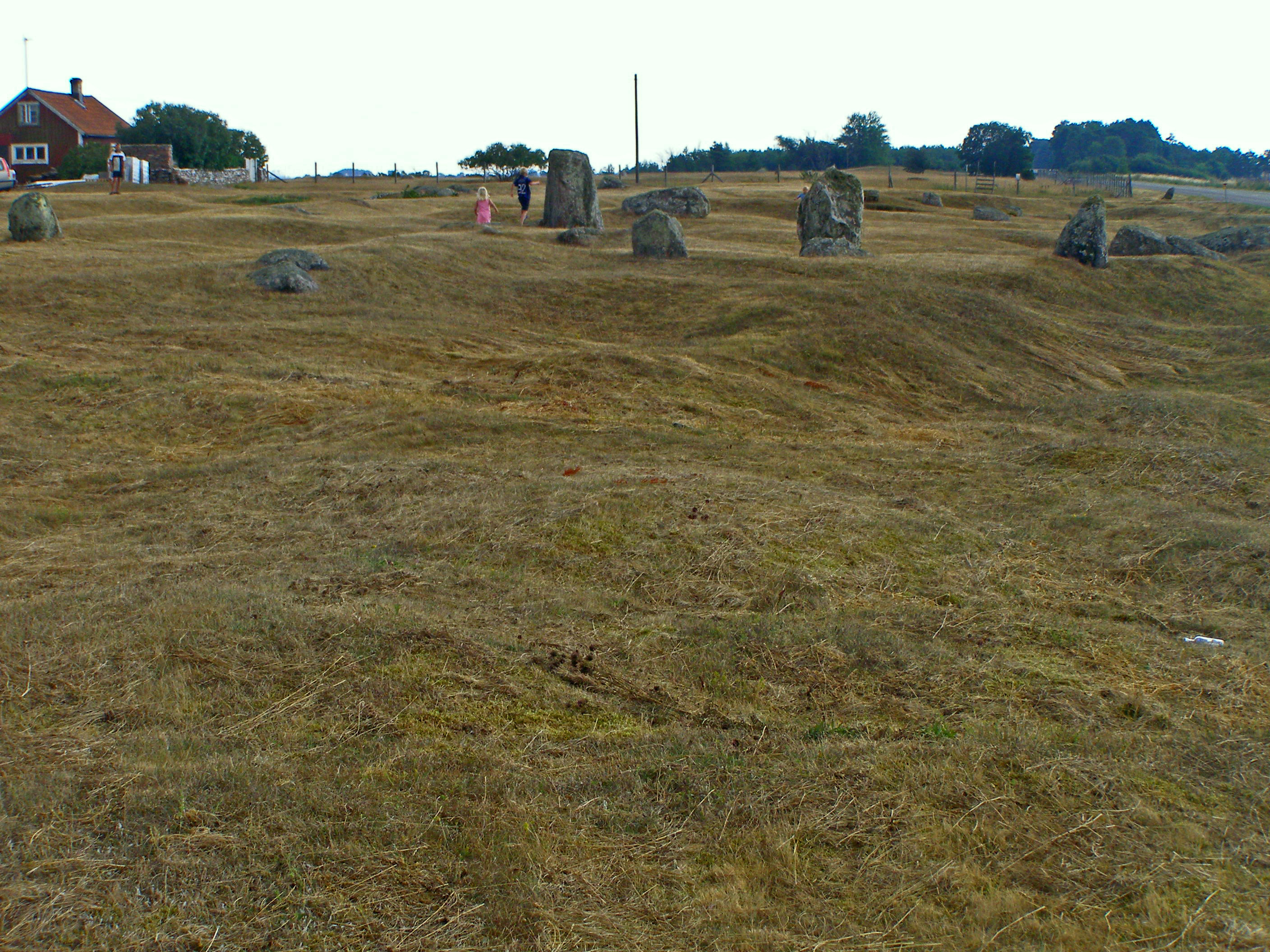
Hulterstad Gravefield south of Alby with undulating barrows and standing stones.

The principal evidence of life in the Alby area from 1000 BC to 1000 AD is derived from the Hulterstad district grave fields slightly south of Alby. The Hulterstad Gravfeld is situated to the east of the coast highway and contains undulating barrows comprising over 170 individual burials, making it one of the largest gravefields on Öland. These burials span the late Bronze Age, Iron Age and Viking periods. The wavy terrain is characteristic of Iron Age barrows, and there are numerous standing stones present. Numerous artefacts have been recovered from this gravefield, including bronze chains and a bone needle case.

Viking graves have also been found at the Hulterstad Gravefield (Hulterstads gravfält) as well as the extensive Strandvalle Gravfeld a few kilometers further south. These findings imply that Alby was a link within a chain of Viking settlements concentrated on the southeast coast of Öland. Seafaring Viking cultures seemed to prefer the eastern side of the island, probably more due to the good beaches and ample forestation.

== Middle Ages through late seventeenth century ==
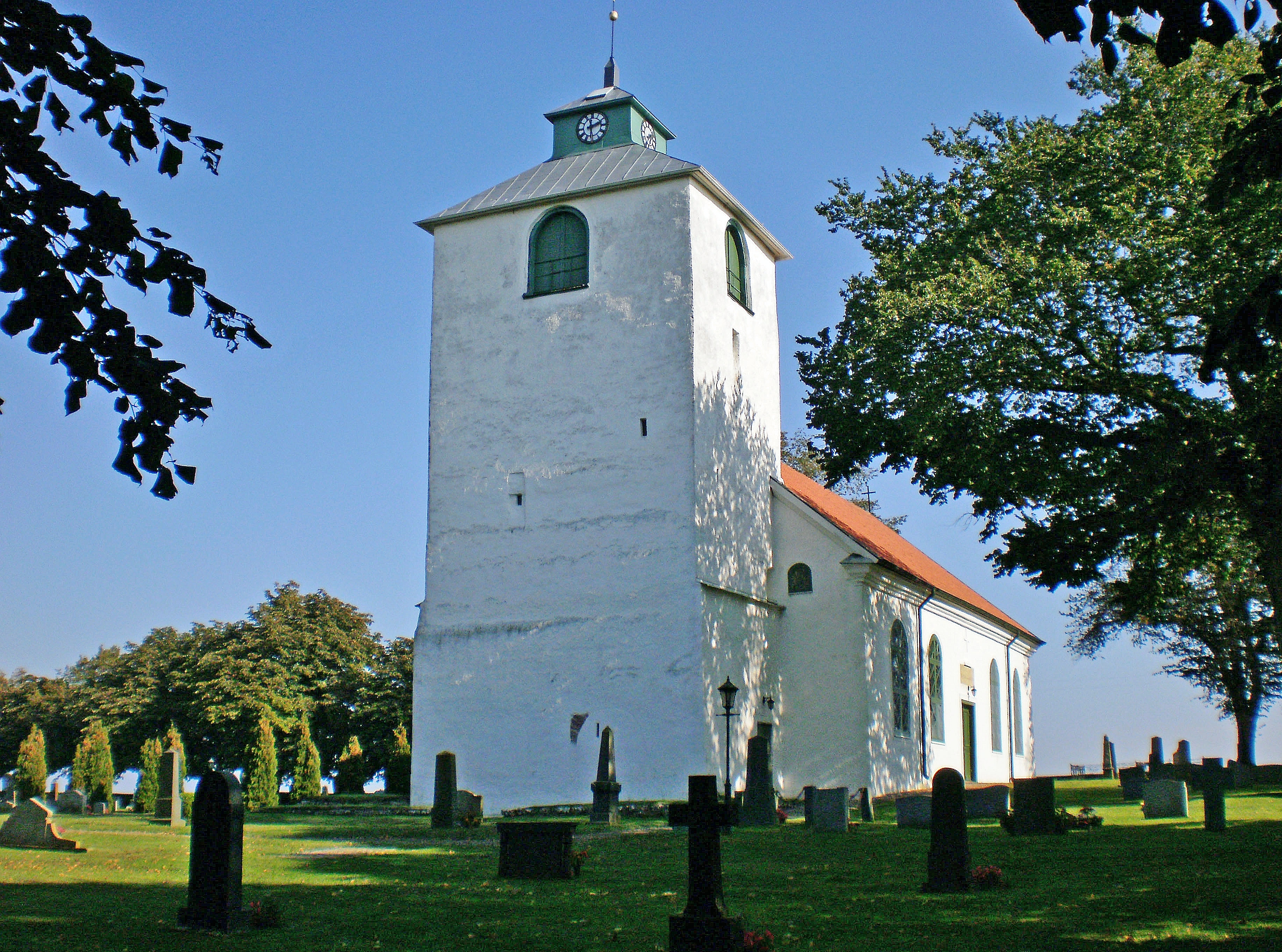
Hulterstad Church

While little recorded information exists for this period, Viking interments are dated to the High Middle Ages. By royal decree, detailed church records began to be kept by the latter 17th century in the form of births, deaths, baptisms and annual household censuses. For the entire Hulterstad district, these archives were prepared and maintained at the Hulterstad Church (Hulterstads kyrka). These records form a basis of estimating the population and lifespans of Alby residents at the end of the 17th century, since the records of Alby were kept distinct from other villages within the Hulterstad district. The late 17th century village population has been estimated at 35 to 60 individuals with life expectancy approximately 45 years. The oldest surviving buildings in Alby date to the 16th century; ironically they are Malmhouses, homes created for housing the poor and landless; in fact, these homes were built to very high standards of that early era and consist of heavy timber construction and interior fireplaces. The social and cultural values of early Swedes are evidenced by the willingness of the landed citizens to fund quality housing for the poorer members of the community as early as the 16th century; moreover, this is an early proof of the industriousness of the poor to build substantial housing on land they did not own.

== 1680s to 1870s ==
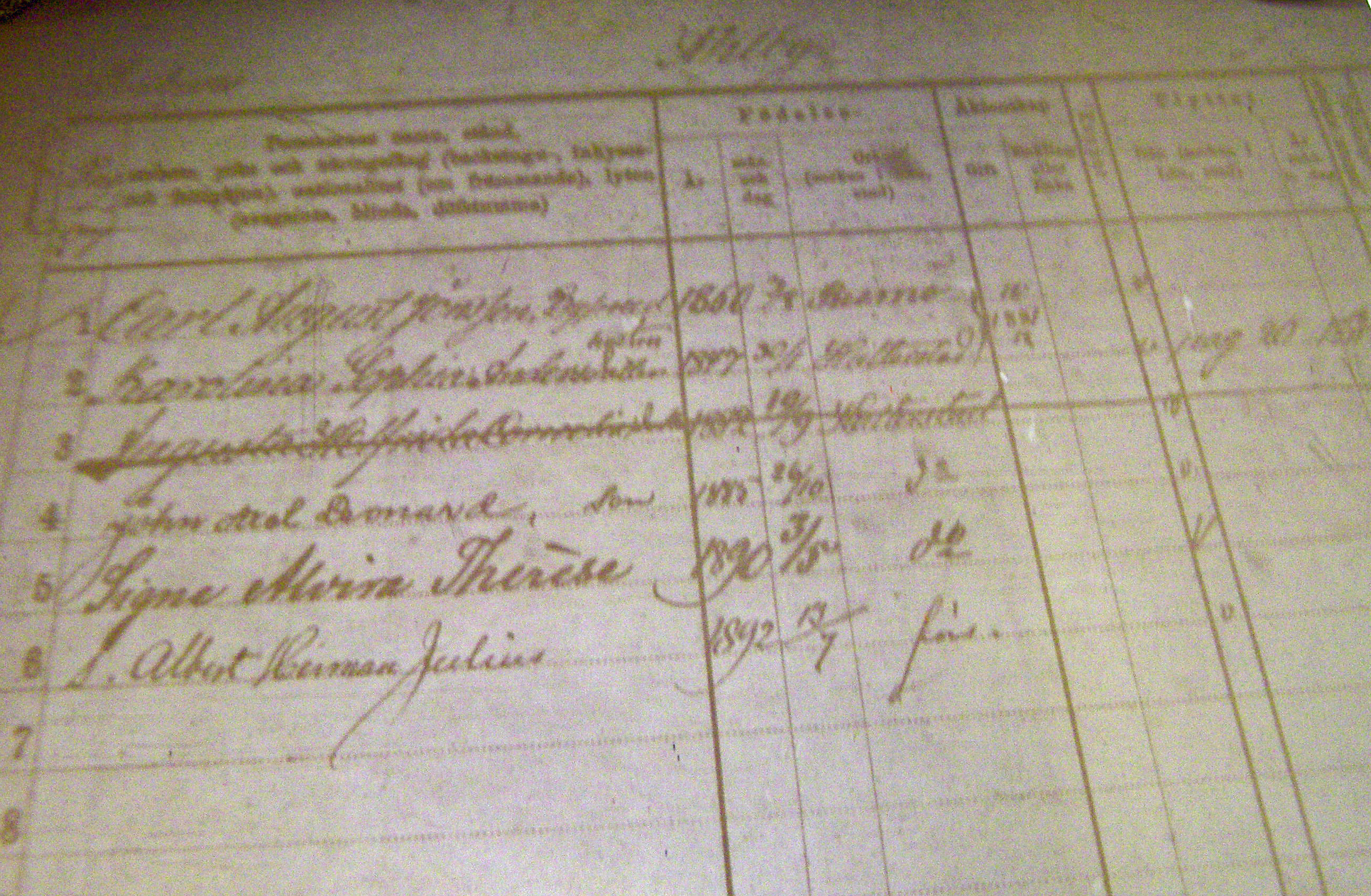
Handwritten household record from a mid nineteenth century Alby family. Source: Hulterstad Church archives.

Population continued to expand, but farming ceased to be the sole form of livelihood, even though it remained the dominant form of work. The village evolved specialists such as blacksmith and tailor. The village blacksmith's shop was constructed in this era on the west side of the coast highway, probably in the 18th century, and is extant as of 2006; it has been converted to a small museum. It is of interest that the smithy structure had to be erected outside of the 17th century drystone town wall, because the activity posed a fire risk to others.

This era began the wave of American emigration that brought large numbers of Swedes to the New World. In addition to extensive handwritten records kept by the Hulterstad Church during this time, detailed records of ships' passages carrying immigrants were kept, and they register many people from Alby travelling to the United States of America to begin a new life. Copies of both types of records are maintained at the Swedish Emigrant Institute in the city of Växjö.

== Demography and current aspect ==
The 2006 population is estimated at 125 people. Like Öland as a whole, about 94 percent are Lutheran Protestant. More than 90 percent of the population are native Swedes, and the entire population is white. While most of the population is permanent, there are a few homes which are used only as summer holiday homes, mostly owned by Swedes who have a primary home elsewhere in the country.

There is virtually no commercial land use in Alby as of 2006, nor is there a history of commercial land use. The village consists of single family residences, some of which are part of a farming operation. The sole exceptions to residential and agricultural uses are a bookstore/cafe building and a small museum, the latter of which is the original blacksmith's workshop.

== Flora and fauna ==
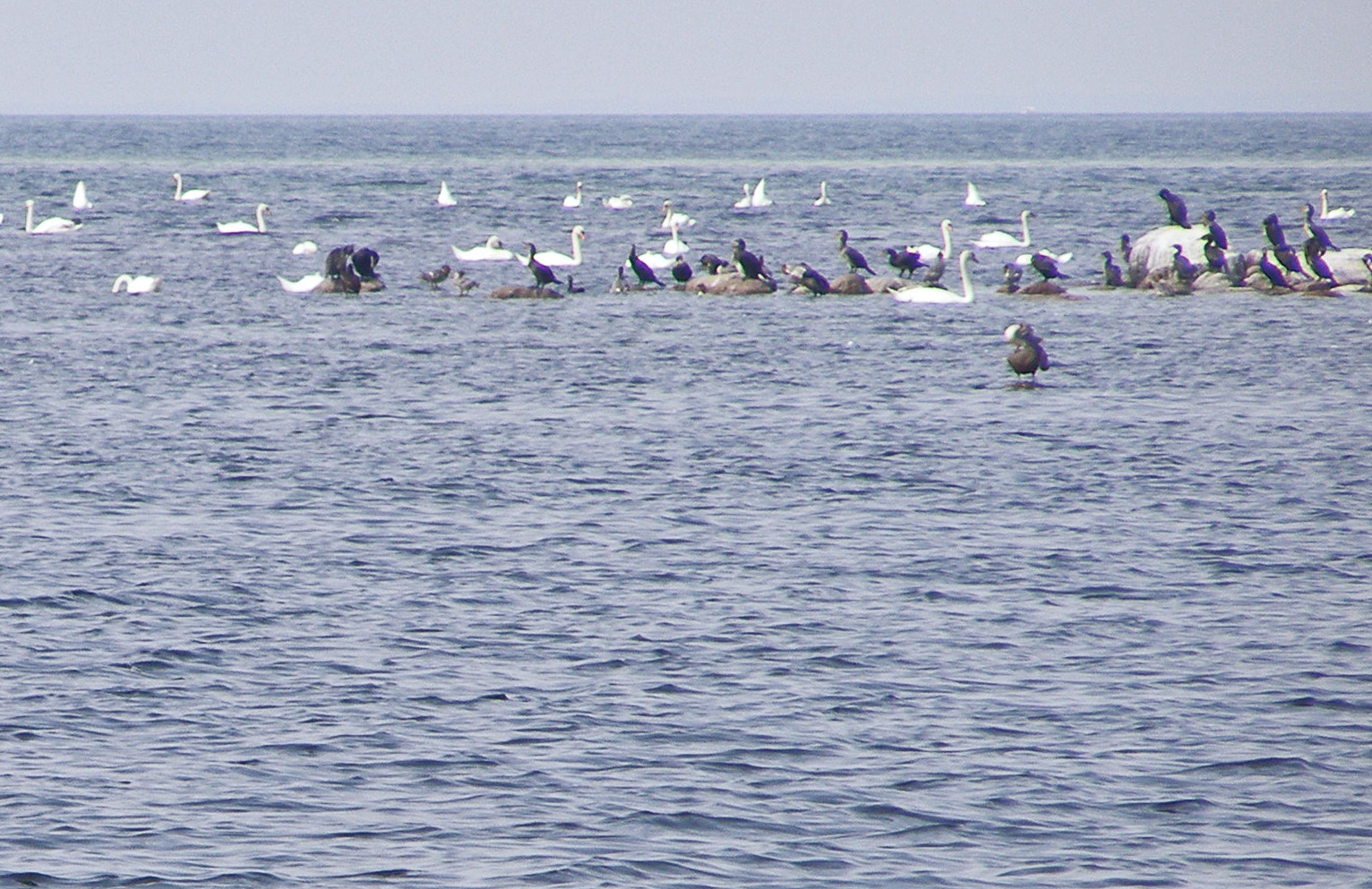
Mute swans and cormorants near shore in the Baltic Sea near Alby.

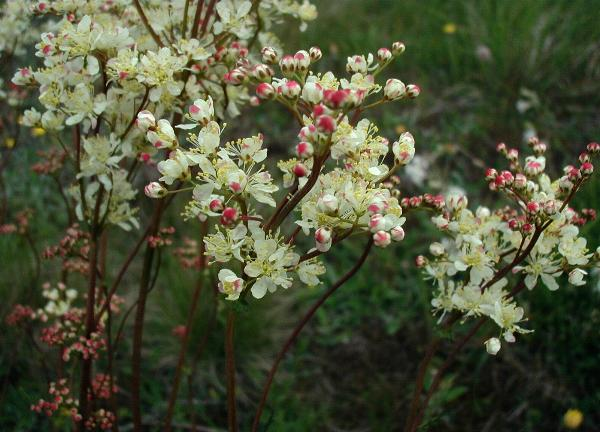
Filipendula vulgaris (dropwort) plant found on this part of the Stora Alvaret at Alby.

The western fringe of Alby includes some grazing land and borders on the Stora Alvaret, the greatest expanse of alvar habitat in Europe. This unique geological formation is an almost level plateau. The Stora Alvaret has an extremely thin soil mantle, that creates conditions of unusual adaptation and hence leads to a host of rare plant species. The first documented scientific study of the biota of the eastern part of the Stora Alvaret occurred in the year 1741 with the visit of Linnaeus. He wrote of this unusual ecosystem: "It is noteworthy how some plants are able to thrive on the driest and most barren places of the alvar". The alvar here also supports rare species of butterflies, moths and other insects.

Some relict species from the glacial age are among the flora palette of the Stora Alvaret. A wide variety of wildflowers and other plants are found on the limestone pavement ecosystem. Some of the species found include stonecrop, dropwort, Artemisia Öelandica (endemic to Öland), and kidney vetch. At the northwest of Alby is a seasonal wetland having vernal pools and corresponding diversity of wetland plants.

The eastern part of Alby is a coastal plain leading to sand and shingle beaches. This sandy coastal plain supports a variety of native grasses and beach wildflowers different from the alvar species on Alby's west side. Avifauna on the beach side include the black tern and Eurasian curlew, both of which also frequent the vernal ponds to the north. Marine birds found here include great cormorants and mute swans; marine mammals such as harbour seal and harbour porpoise are also seen.

== See also ==
- Drystone wall
- Gettlinge
- Viking

== Related reading ==
- Mats Larsson (2017) Life and Death in the Mesolithic of Sweden (Oxford, England: Oxbow Books) ISBN 9781785703881
