= Ice bridge =

Frozen natural structure formed over seas, bays, rivers or lake surfaces

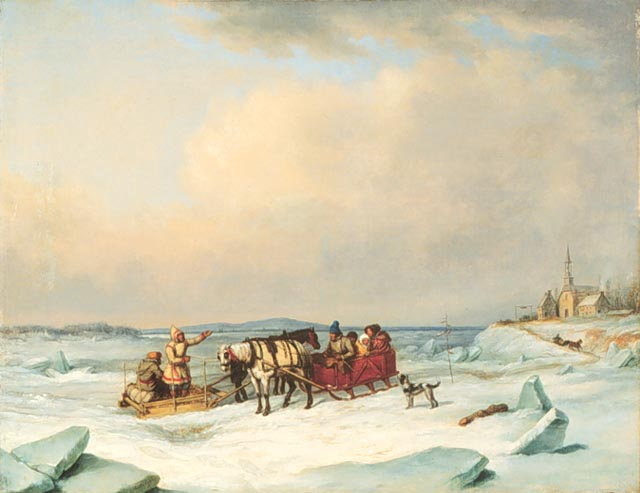
Cornelius Krieghoff's 1847 painting The Ice Bridge at Longue-Pointe

An ice bridge is a frozen natural structure formed over seas, bays, rivers or lake surfaces. Ice bridges facilitate migration of animals or people over a water body that was previously uncrossable by terrestrial animals, including humans. The most significant examples are formed by glaciation, spanning distances of many miles over sometimes relatively deep water bodies.

One such major ice bridge was that connecting the island of Öland with mainland Sweden approximately 9000 BC. This bridge reached its maximum utility when the glacier was in retreat, forming a low-lying frozen bridge. The Öland ice bridge allowed the first human migration to the island of Öland, which is most readily documented by archaeological studies of the Alby People.

In Jules Verne's 1873 novel The Fur Country, a group of fur trappers established a fort on what they think is stable ground, only to find later on that is merely an iceberg temporarily attached by an ice bridge to the mainland.

== See also ==
- Ice road
- Land bridge
- Snow bridge
