= Eketorp =

Iron Age fort in Sweden

Coordinates: 56°17′44″N 16°29′10″E

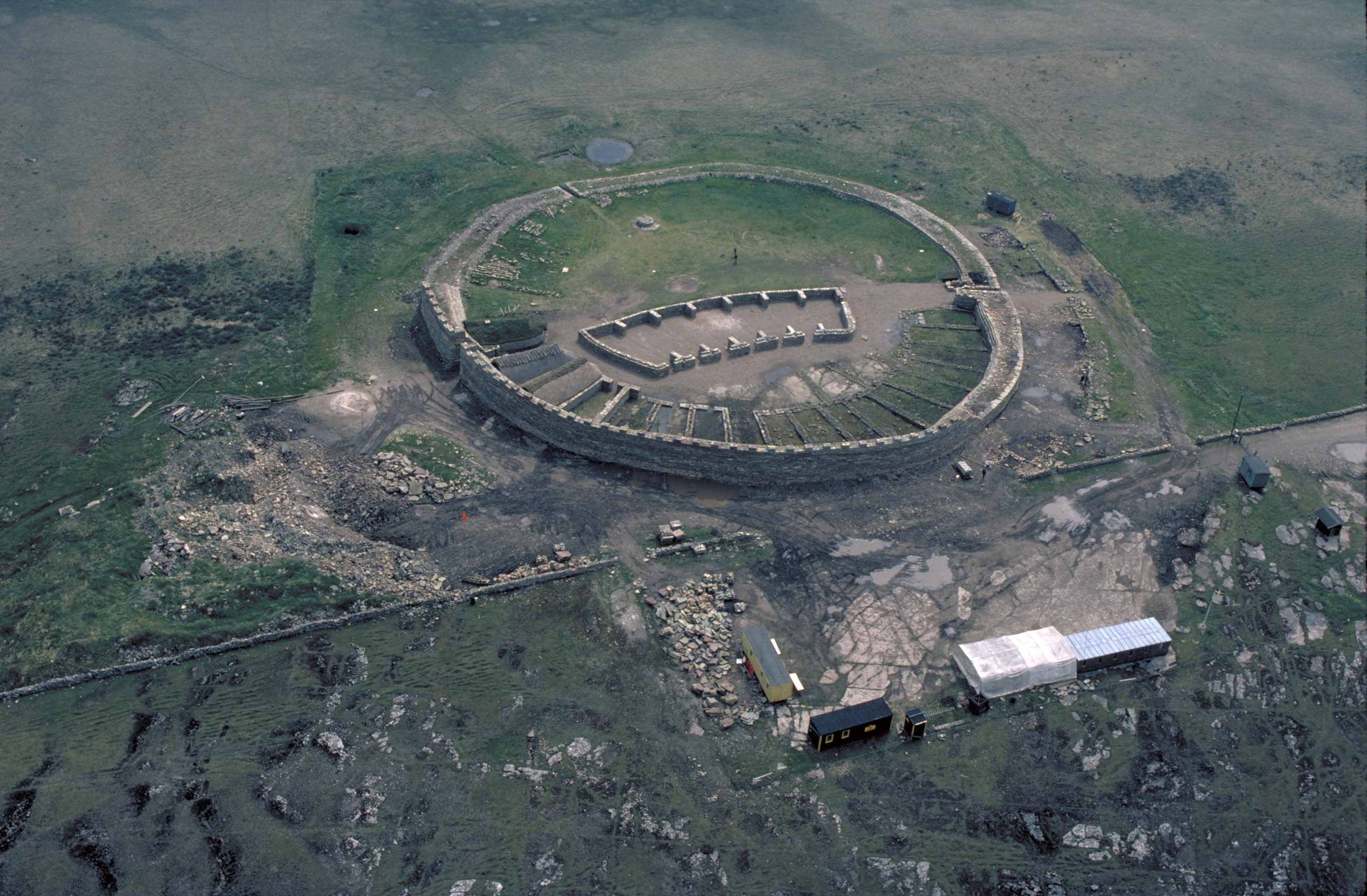
Aerial view from the 1970s.

Eketorp is an Iron Age fort, located in southeastern Öland, Sweden, and extensively reconstructed and enlarged in the Middle Ages. Throughout the ages the fortification has served a variety of somewhat differing uses: from defensive ringfort, to medieval safe haven and thence a cavalry garrison. In the 20th century it was further reconstructed to become a heavily visited tourist site and a location for re-enactment of medieval battles. Eketorp is the only one of the 19 known prehistoric fortifications on Öland that has been completely excavated, yielding a total of over 24,000 individual artifacts. The entirety of southern Öland has been designated as a World Heritage Site by UNESCO. The Eketorp fortification is often referred to as Eketorp Castle.

== History ==
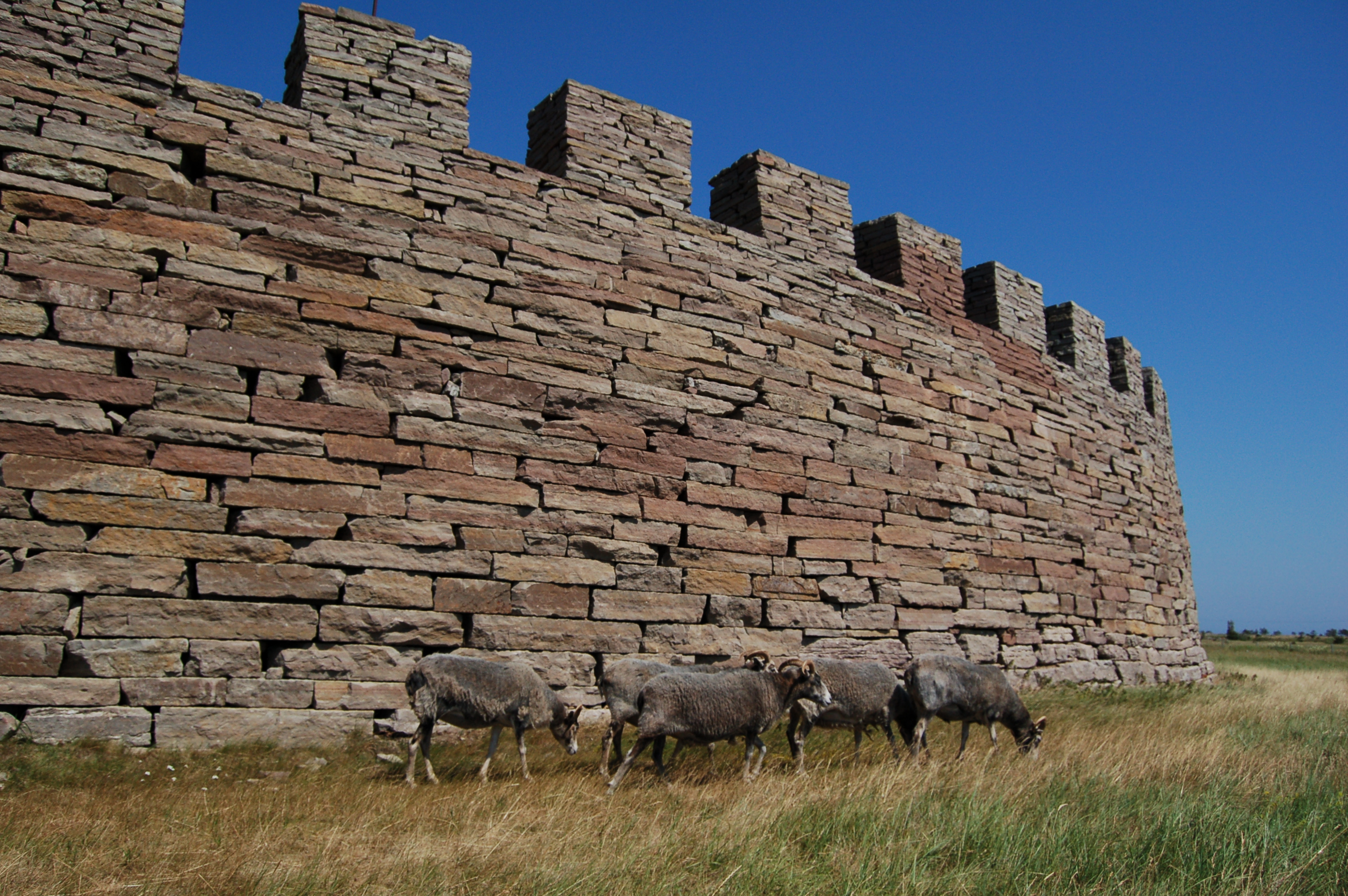
Eketorp exterior wall with sheep grazing

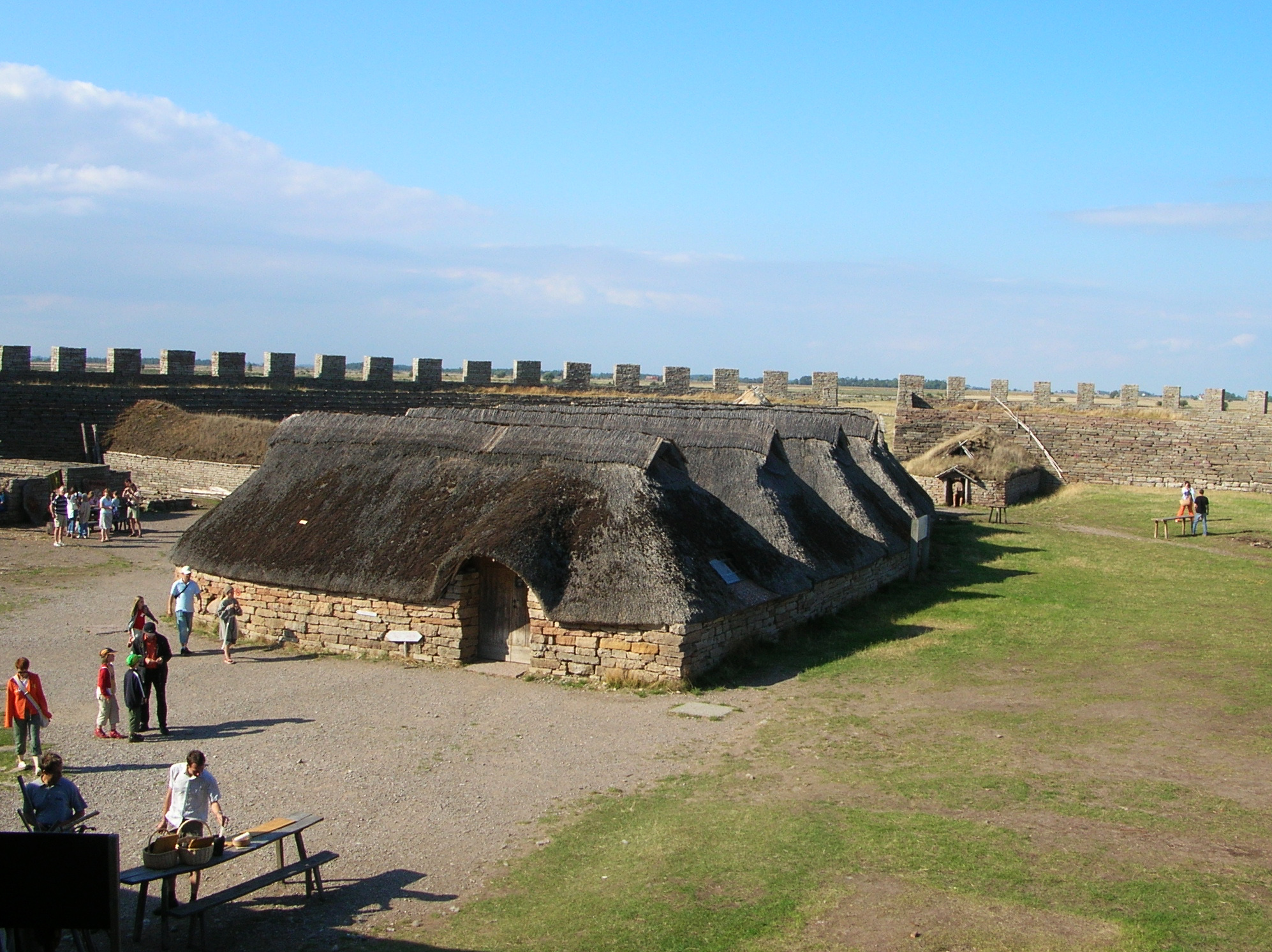
The long houses.

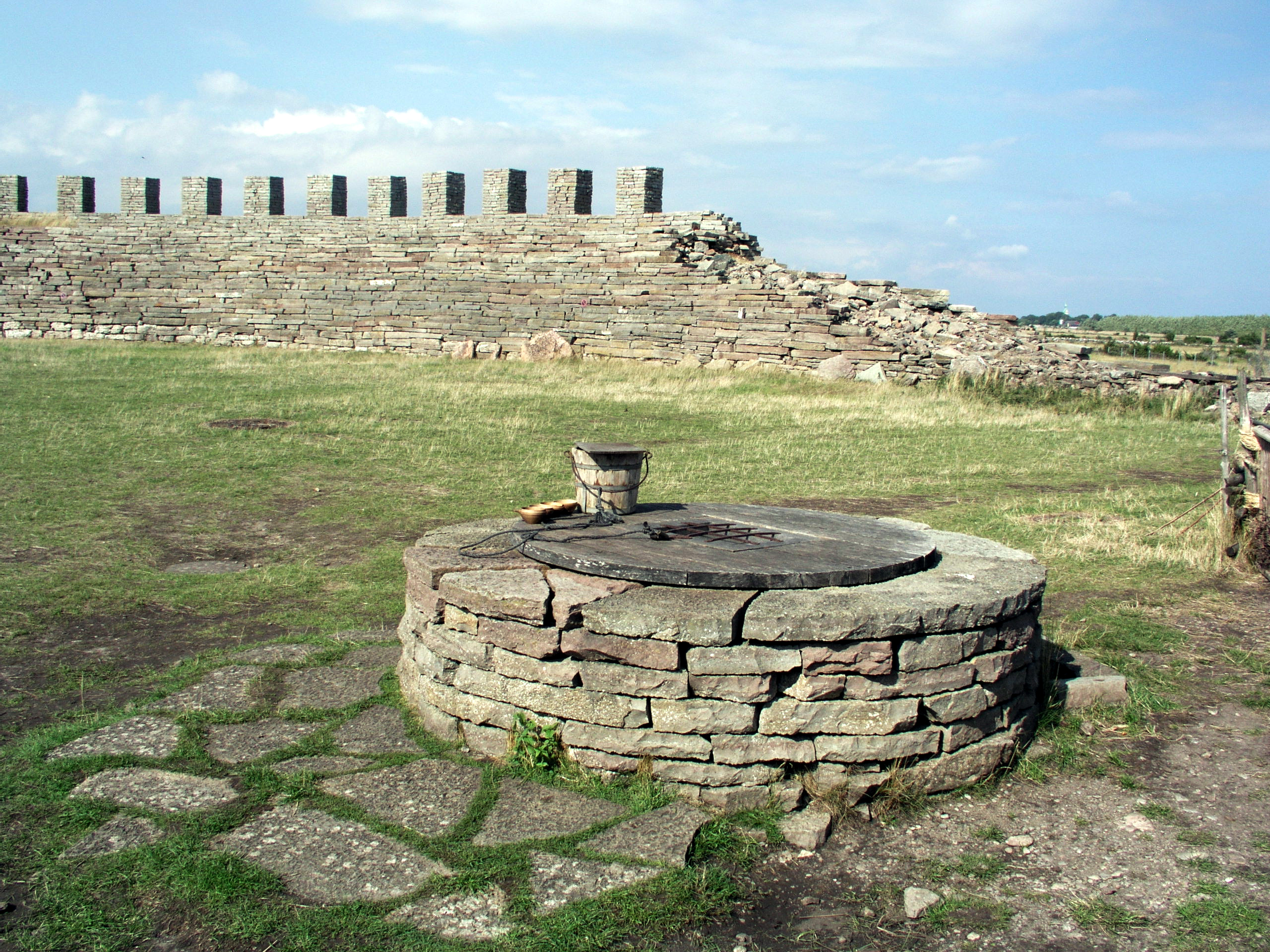
The water well inside the fort, no doubt a strong reason for its location

The indigenous peoples of the Iron Age constructed the original fortification about 400 AD, a period known to have engendered contact between Öland natives with Romans and other Europeans. The ringfort in that era is thought to have been a gathering place for religious ceremonies and also a place of refuge for the local agricultural community when an outside enemy appeared. The circular design was believed to be chosen because the terrain is so level that attack from any side was equally likely. The original diameter of this circular stone fortification was about 57 metres (187 ft). In the next century the stone was moved outward to construct a new circular structure of about 80 metres (260 ft) in diameter. At this juncture there were known to be about fifty individual cells or small structures within the fort as a whole. Some of these cells were in the center of the fortified ring, and some were actually built into the wall itself.

In the mid 600s AD, the ringfort was mysteriously abandoned, and it remained unused until the early 11th century. This 11th century work generally built upon the earlier fort, except that stone interior cells were replaced with timber structures, and a second outer defensive wall was erected.

== Modern day situation ==
Presently the fort is used as a tourist site for visitors to Öland to experience a fortification for this region. A museum located in the interior long houses displays a few of the large number of artifacts retrieved by the National Heritage Board during a decade long excavation which ended in 1974. Visitors are charged an admission fee. Inside the fort, visitors are greeted by employees wearing the historical costumes meant to simulate the possible clothing of the time between the years 400 and 650 CE. There are daily activities during the summer season (mid June to mid August), which include archery, bread baking, crafts and many activities for children. Guided tours are also available. There is a gift shop on site. Besides being a tourist attraction, the site has also been used for experimental archaeology.

Eketorp lies a few kilometers west of route 136. There is an ample unpaved parking area situated approximately two kilometers west of the paved Öland perimeter highway.

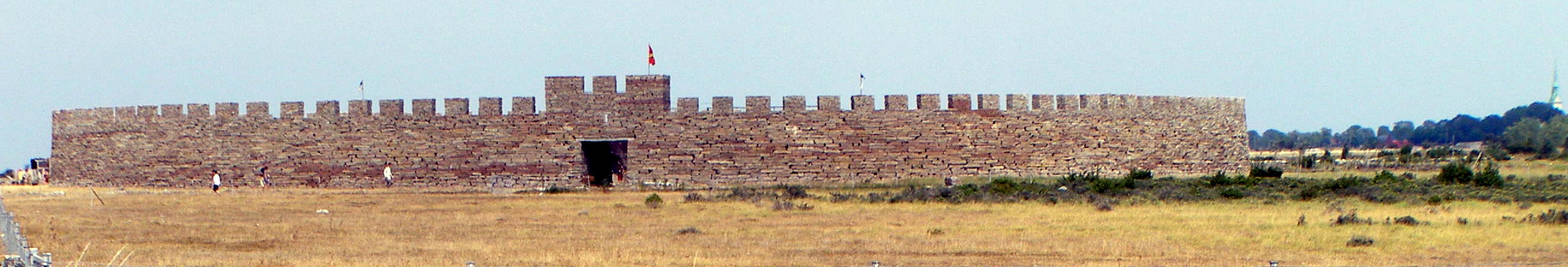
A panoramic view of Eketorp Castle

In 2005 the exhibition was the centre of a controversy when the staff recreated Iron Age horse sacrifices which involved presenting real horse heads mounted on poles, based on archaeological evidence. Several children saw the displayed heads and the museum was reported to the police. The case was brought to court, on the basis of improper handling of slaughterhouse byproducts, but the museum was freed on all points. The museum's staff defended their actions on account of presenting the realism of the Iron Age under the guidance of experienced archaeologists. They also pointed out that the Lejre Experimental Centre in Denmark had displayed similar "sacrifices" since the 1970s. The staff was also critical to how the media handled the situation, making a point of Kvällsposten and Expressen having focused on the sensationalism (handling of animal byproducts) of the case rather than the actual legal concerns (improper handling of remains).

Since 2019, the municipality of Mörbylånga is responsible for Eketorps borg. The first season was a great success with almost 39 000 visitors. In 2020 the fortress will open at Easter and will be open until late September and the Öland Harvest Festival.

== See also ==
- Alby People
- Alvar
- Dry-stone wall
- Ringfort
- Stora Alvaret
