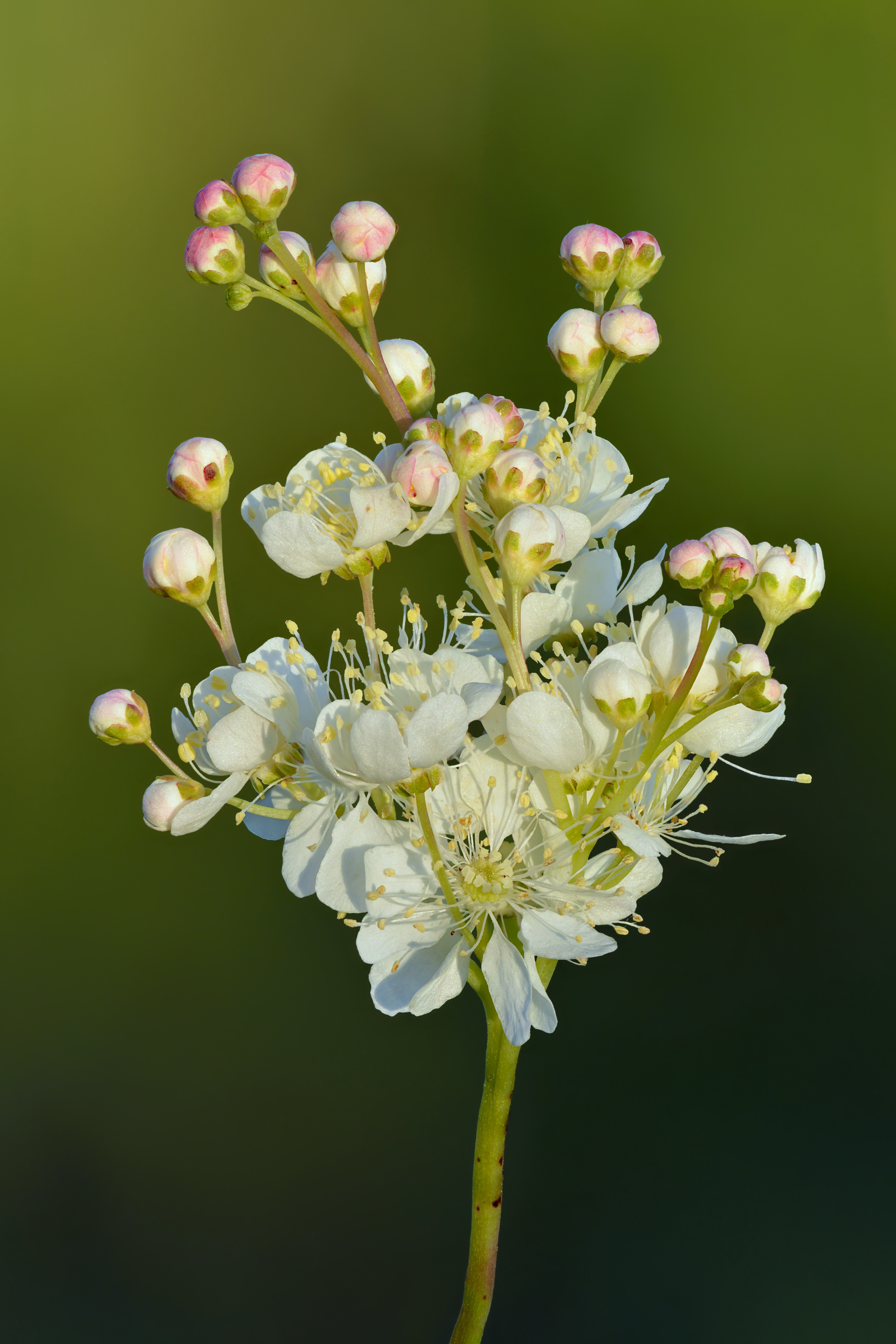
- Inflorescence

Conservation status
- Least Concern (IUCN 3.1) (Europe regional assessment)

- Secure (NatureServe)

Scientific classification
- Kingdom: Plantae
- Clade: Tracheophytes
- Clade: Angiosperms
- Clade: Eudicots
- Clade: Rosids
- Order: Rosales
- Family: Rosaceae
- Genus: Filipendula
- Species: F. vulgaris

Binomial name
- Filipendula vulgaris Moench

Synonyms
- List: Filipendula filipendula (L.) Voss; Filipendula hexapetala Gilib.; Filipendula hexapetala Gilib. ex Maxim.; Filipendula pubescens (DC.) Fourr.; Filipendula vulgaris Hill; Spiraea filipendula L.; Spiraea gigantea Gand.; Spiraea noeana Gand.; Spiraea pubescens DC.; Spiraea tuberosa Salisb.; Spiraea vulgaris (Moench) Gray; Ulmaria filipendula (L.) A.Braun ex Asch.; Ulmaria filipendula (L.) Hill; Ulmaria filipendula (L.) Hill ex Focke

= Filipendula vulgaris =

Dropwort

Species of flowering plant

Filipendula vulgaris, commonly known as dropwort or fern-leaf dropwort, is a perennial herbaceous plant in the family Rosaceae, closely related to meadowsweet (Filipendula ulmaria). It is found in Europe, western Siberia, Asia Minor, the Caucusus and North Africa. It prefers dry pastures, mostly on lime rich soils.

The leaves and roots are a source of methyl salicylate (oil of wintergreen).

== Taxonomy and naming ==
The genus name Filipendula comes from Latin filum ("thread") and pendulus ("hanging") in reference to the root tubers that hang from the roots in some species. The specific epithet vulgaris means "common". The English name "dropwort" comes from the tubers that hang like drops from the root. The species was first described in the literature in 1794 by Conrad Moench in Methodus Plantas.

== Description ==
It has finely-cut, fern-like radical leaves which form a basal rosette, and an erect stem 20–50 centimetres (8–20 in) tall bearing a loose terminal inflorescence of small creamy white flowers. The flowers appear in dense clusters from late spring to midsummer atop sparsely leafed stems. The plant has an overall height of 50–100 centimetres (20–40 in), achieved after 2–5 years, and a spread of around about 10–50 centimetres (4–20 in).

This plant prefers full sun or partial shade. It is more tolerant of dry conditions than most other members of its genus. It is a perennial of chalk and limestone downs and on heaths on other basic rocks.

== Cultivation ==
Propagation is by seed and the division of the creeping roots. The tuberous roots and young leaves can be cooked as a vegetable or eaten raw as a salad. The taste is bitter sweet. The mature leaves smell of oil of wintergreen when crushed, due to the release of methyl salicylate.

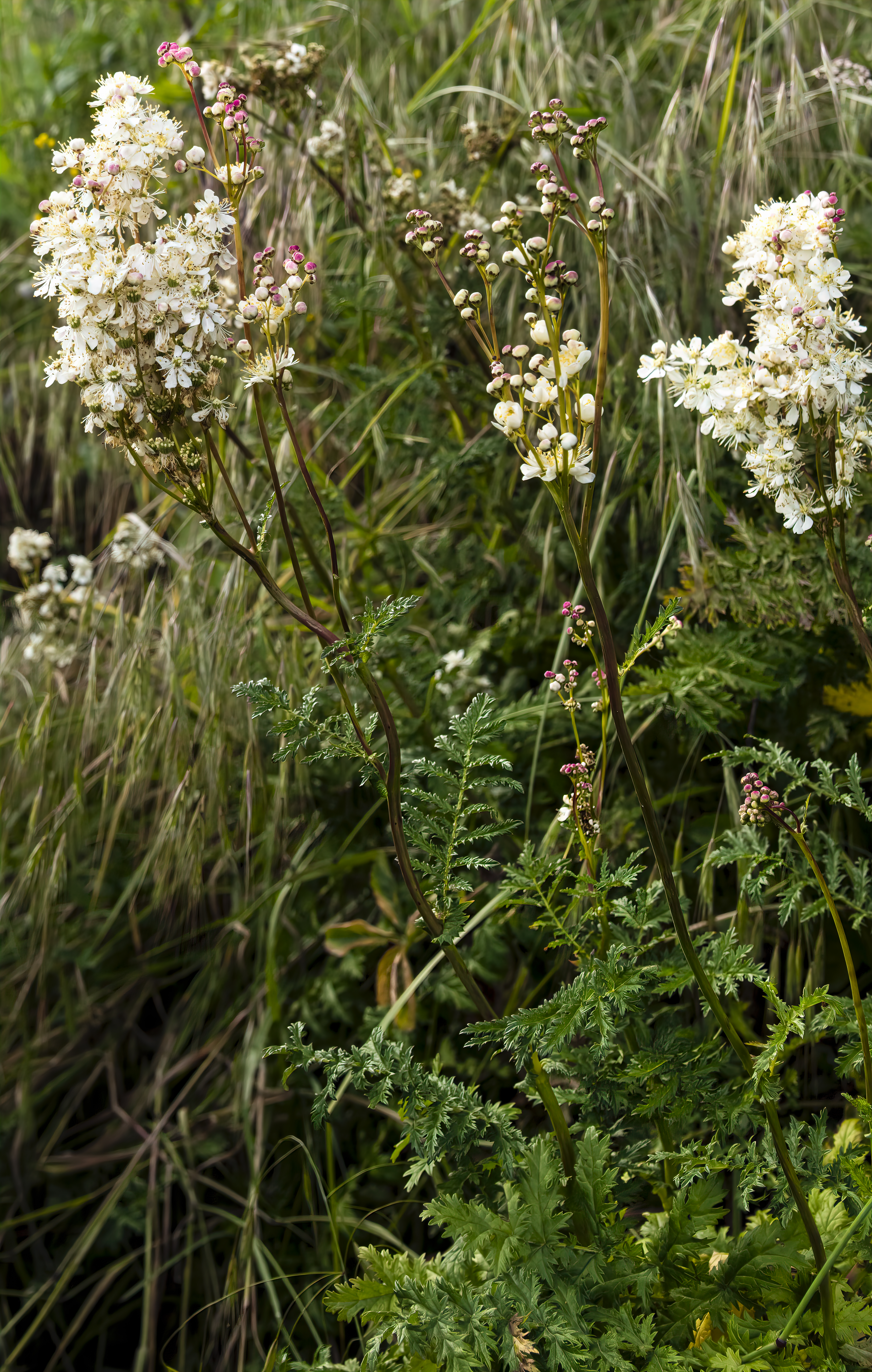
Habitat

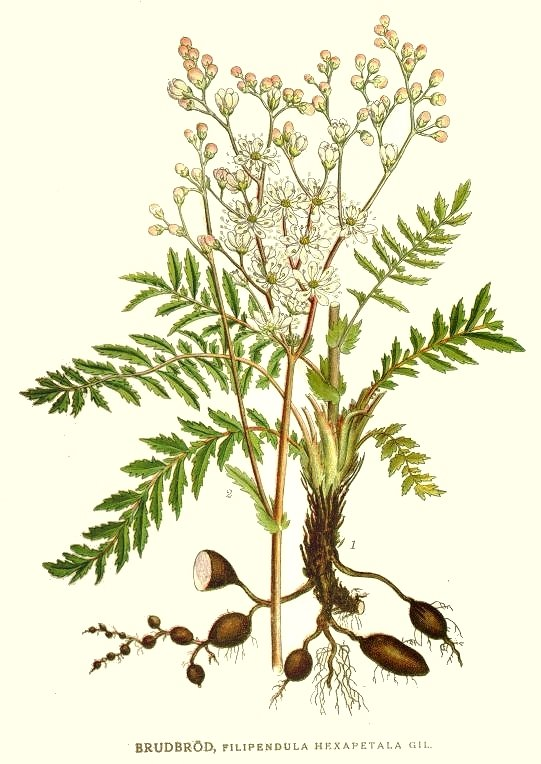
Illustration showing tubers
