= Stora Alvaret =

UNESCO World Heritage Site
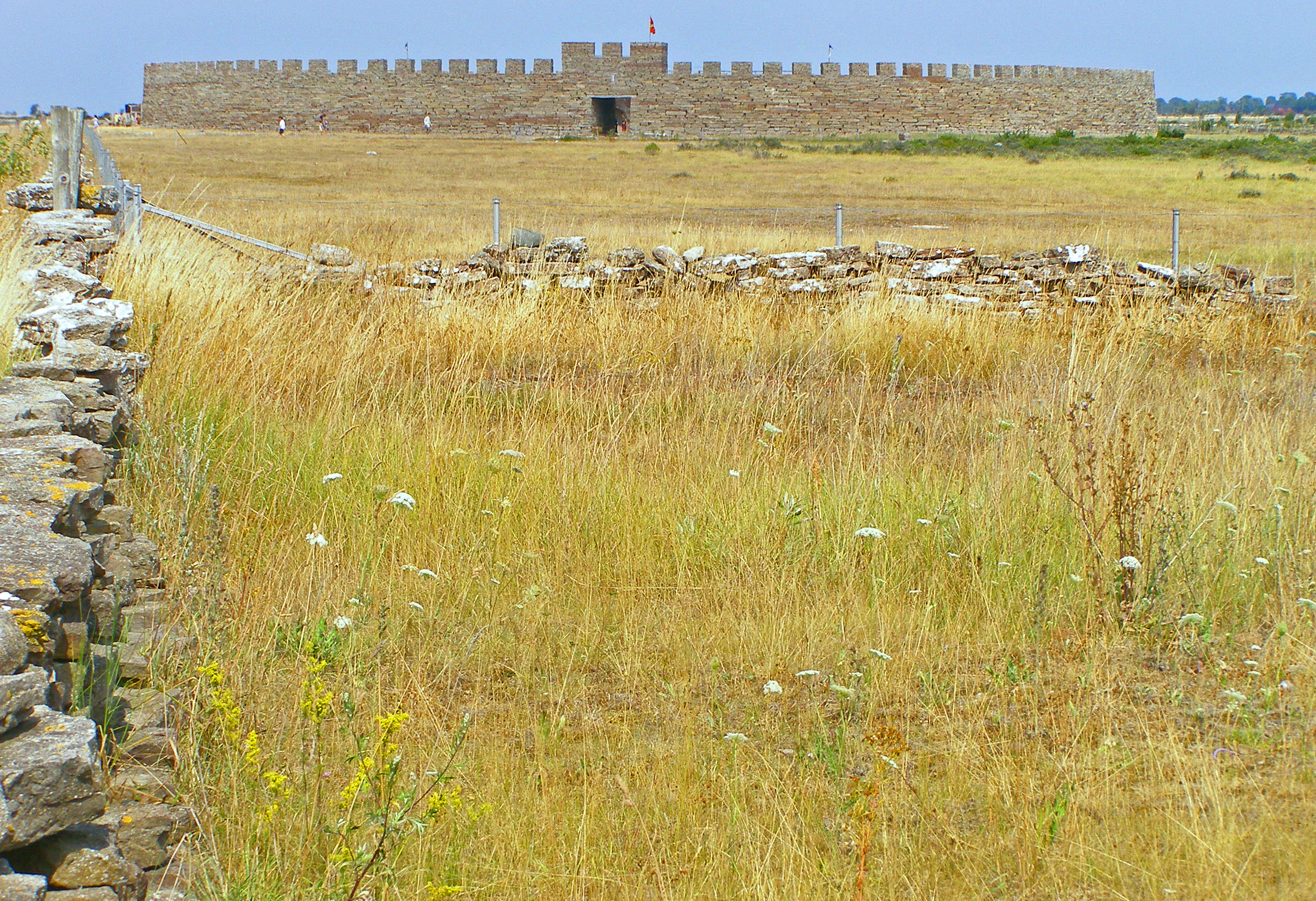
- Stora Alvaret on southeast of Öland with Eketorp Fortress in background.

- Location within Sweden
- Location: Öland, Mörbylånga Municipality, Sweden
- Part of: Agricultural Landscape of Southern Öland
- Criteria: Cultural: iv, v
- Reference: 968
- Inscription: 2000 (24th Session)
- Coordinates: 56°28′00″N 16°33′00″E

Stora Alvaret (Swedish: [ˈstûːra ˈâlːvarɛt]; "the Great Alvar") is an alvar, a barren limestone terrace, in the southern half of the island of Öland, Sweden. Stora Alvaret is a dagger shaped expanse almost 40 kilometres (25 mi) long and about 10 kilometres (6 mi) at the widest north end. The area of this formation exceeds 260 square kilometres (100 sq mi), making it the largest such expanse in Europe and comprising over one fourth of the land area of the island.

Because of the thin soil mantle and high pH levels, a great assortment of vegetation is found including numerous rare species. Stora Alvaret is not devoid of trees, contrary to a common misconception; in fact, it holds a variety of sparse stunted trees akin to a pygmy forest.

Stora Alvaret falls within UNESCO's Agricultural Landscape of Southern Öland, 56,323 hectares (217.46 sq mi), which was designated World Heritage Site due to its extraordinary prehistory.

== Geological origins ==
The limestone plain was created by glacial action from earlier ice age advances. The limestone formation itself was created about 500 million years ago in more southerly seas. Gradually hardening into limestone and drifting northward, the limestone of Stora Alvaret contains a rich fossil record of some of the marine creatures who contributed to it. For example, orthoceratites are found in some of the present day structures on the island.

Only as recently as 11,000 years ago did the first portions of the island of Öland emerge from the Baltic Sea, after the overpressure of the last glaciers was relieved by melting. Over the next several thousand years, more ice melted and the first wave of large mammals including humans migrated across the ice bridge from the mainland. Finally a thin soil mantle (only two centimetres at the deepest) was formed by plant colonisation of the bare limestone and some wind driven deposition, to create the alvar formation of the present. In many places the limestone has no soil whatsoever upon it.

== Prehistoric man ==
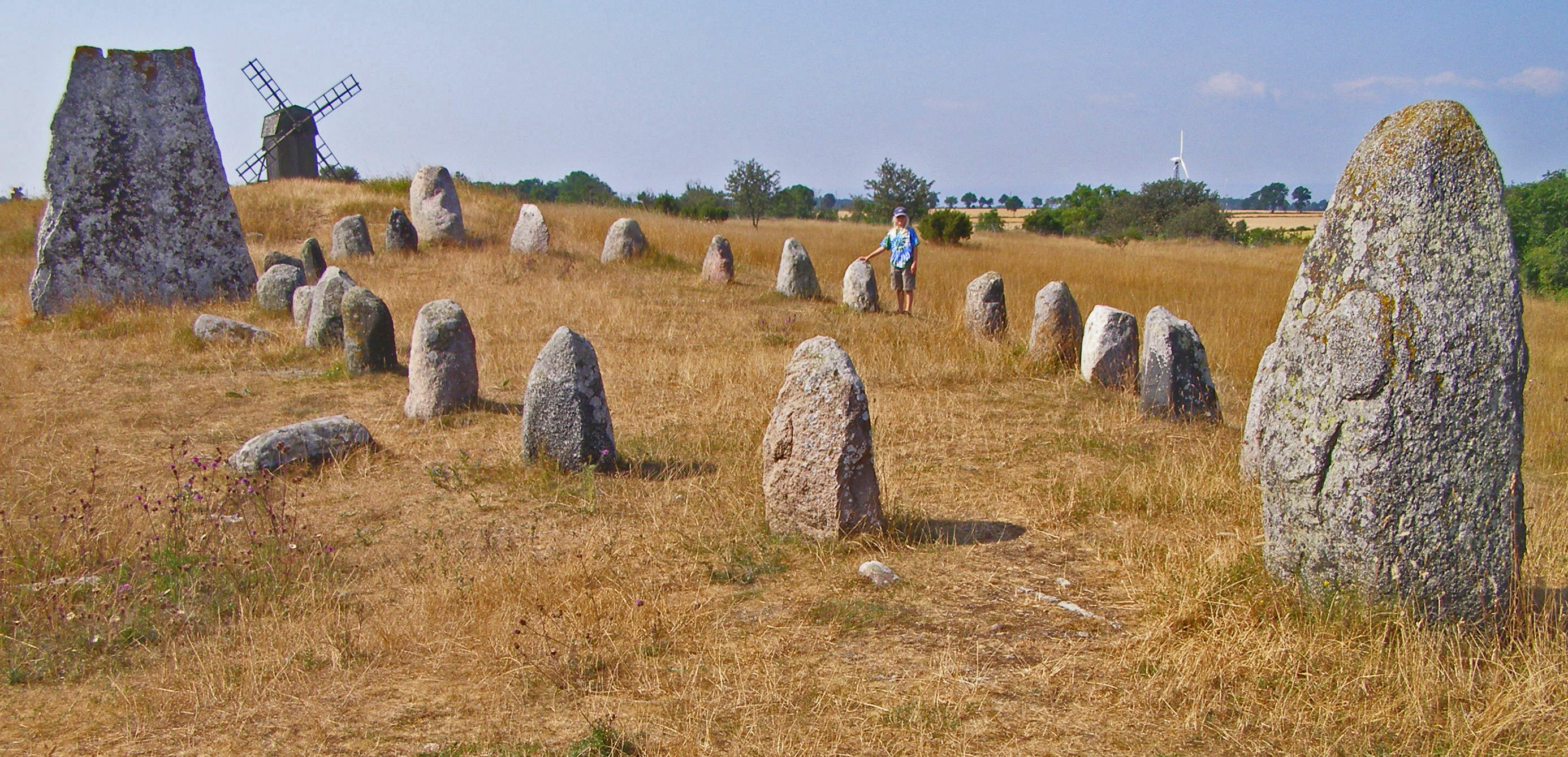
Gettlinge Gravefield, Öland, Sweden with standing stones forming a Viking stone ship.

The best known early Paleolithic settlement occurs at Alby, situated on the east coast of the island, where excavations have revealed vestiges of wooden huts around a prehistoric lagoon. Artefacts retrieved include evidence of bear, marten, seal and porpoise, but also reveal hunting and gathering technologies through discovery of bone spears, elk antler harpoons and flint.

Evidence of later ringforts abounds including the most well-known site at Eketorp. In the Bronze Age and early part of the Iron Age, extreme pressure was exerted on the limited tree species growing on Stora Alvaret and its margins. Jannson suggests that this disappearance of trees caused a mysterious evaporation of humans about 500 AD which is documented at Eketorp and other sites. It is thought provoking to imagine that the expanded human population may have exceeded its carrying capacity of this place by about 500 AD. Later, about 800 to 1000 AD various Viking settlements appeared on the fringe of Stora Alvaret.

== Ecology ==
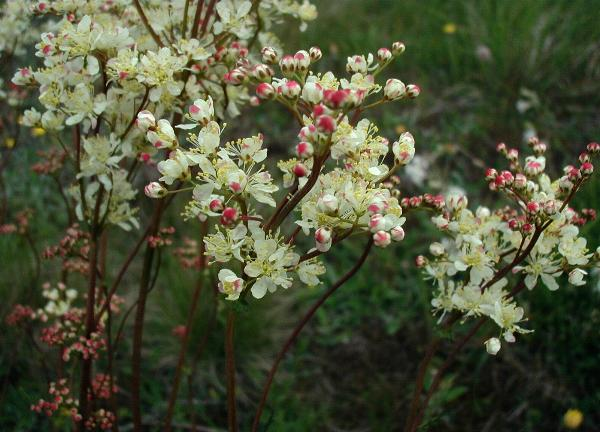
Filipendula vulgaris (Dropwort) plant which is found on Stora Alvaret.

The first documented scientific study of the biota of Stora Alvaret occurred in the year 1741 with the visit of Linnaeus. He wrote of this unusual ecosystem: "It is noteworthy how some plants are able to thrive on the driest and most barren places of the alvar". Some relict species from the glacial age are among the flora palette of Stora Alvaret. A wide variety of wildflowers and other plants are found on the limestone pavement ecosystem. Some of the species found include stonecrop, dropwort, Artemisia oelandica (endemic to Öland), Shrubby Cinquefoil, Common spotted orchid and kidney vetch. Most of these wildflowers bloom from May to July.

Numerous grasses are found on this alvar including Meadow Oat-grass and Sheep's Fescue; as would be expected from the occurrence of orchids, many fungi grow on Stora Alvaret such as Hygrocybe persistens and Lepiota alba. Although the alvar here is known for its severely dry conditions, there are some seasonal wetlands and vernal pools, notably the vestigial lagoon area northwest of the village of Alby.

== Practical logistics ==
Stora Alvaret is bounded on the east, west and south by the perimeter public two-lane highway which circumnavigates the entire island. At several latitudes there are less improved roadways that run east-west and intrude directly through Stora Alvaret. Small villages such as Stora Vickleby, Gettlinge, Grönhögen, Hulterstad, Alby, Triberga and Vället lie at the fringe of Stora Alvaret along the perimeter highway. There are fewer and smaller villages within the alvar expanse itself: Möckelmossen, Solberga and Flisås, for example. Some of the old villages are totally deserted such as Dröstorp. At the extreme south end of Stora Alvaret lies Ottenby, a historic royal game farm and now a nature reserve.

== See also ==
- Alvar
- Eketorp
- Stone Age
- Windmill
