= List of places on Öland =

This list of places on Öland contains places on the Swedish island Öland.

== A ==
- Åkerby-Lopperstad
- Alböke
- Albrunna
- Alby
- Äleklinta
- Algutsrum
- Alvlösa
- Arbelunda
- Arontorp
- Ås
- Askelunda
- Åstad

== B ==
- Bägby (Borgholm)
- Bårby (Mörbylånga)
- Binnerbäck
- Björkviken
- Bläsinge (Borgholm)
- Bläsinge (Mörbylånga)
- Böda
- Borgehage
- Borgholm
- Bredinge
- Bredsättra
- Bröttorp
- Byrum
- Byxelkrok

== D ==
- Dalby
- Degerhamn
- Djupvik
- Djurstad
- Dödevi
- Dörby

== E ==
- Egby
- Eketorp
- Enerum
- Eriksöre

== F ==
- Fagerum
- Färjestaden
- Föra
- Frösslunda
- Furuhäll-Blårör-Solbergamarken

== G ==
- Gårdby
- Gärdslösa
- Gårdstorp
- Gettlinge
- Gillberga
- Glömminge
- Grankulla
- Grankullavik
- Gräsgård
- Greby
- Greda
- Grönhögen
- Gunnarslund

== H ==
- Hagby
- Hagby-Bläsinge
- Hagelstad
- Hallnäs
- Halltorp
- Hammarby
- Hässelby
- Hässleby
- Högenäs
- Högsrum
- Hörlösa
- Horn
- Hulterstad

== I ==
- Ingelstad
- Isgärde
- Istad

== K ==
- Källa
- Kalleguta
- Källingemöre
- Kårehamn
- Karlevi
- Kastlösa
- Kleva
- Kolstad
- Köpingsvik
- Kråketorp
- Kvarnstad

== L ==
- Långlöt
- Långöre
- Lenstad
- Lerkaka
- Lilla Horn
- Lindby (Borgholm)
- Lindby (Mörbylånga)
- Lofta
- Löt
- Löttorp

== M ==
- Marsjö
- Mellböda och del av Böda
- Mellby
- Melösa
- Mörby
- Mörbylånga
- Mörbylilla
- Mysinge

== N ==
- Nabbelund
- Näsby
- Norra Kvinneby
- Norra Möckleby
- Norra Näsby

== O ==
- Öjkroken
- Ölands Bäck
- Össby
- Ottenby

== P ==
- Persnäs

== R ==
- Rälla
- Rälla tall
- Ramsättra
- Räpplinge
- Resmo
- Risinge
- Rösslösa
- Runsbäck
- Runsten-Bjärby
- Ryd

== S ==
- Sägerstad
- Sandby
- Sandvik
- Sättra
- Seby
- Skärlöv
- Skogsby
- Smedby
- Södra Möckleby
- Södvik
- Solberga
- Sörby
- Spjutterum
- Stacketorp
- Stenåsa
- Stenninge
- Stora Frö
- Stora Rör
- Störlinge

== T ==
- Tjusby
- Torngård
- Triberga

== U ==
- Uggletorp

== V ==
- Vannborga
- Västerstad
- Vedborm
- Vedby (Öland-M)
- Vedby (Öland-N)
- Ventlinge
- Vickleby
