= Listed buildings in Kalmar County =

There are 120 listed buildings (Swedish: byggnadsminne) in Kalmar County.

== Borgholm Municipality ==
Image	Name	Premises	Number of buildings	Year built	Architect	Coordinates	ID
	Borgholms bio	Kamelen 1	5			56.87837°N 16.65542°E	21300000012289
	Borgholms slottsruin	Borgholm 8:16	1			56.87126°N 16.64411°E	21300000012333
	Bruddesta fiskeläge	Bruddesta 1:1	9			56.99053°N 16.78225°E	21300000012274
	Gamla rektorsbostället, Borgholm	Amfion 7 previously Amfion 2A	1			56.88005°N 16.65548°E	21300000012309
	Gerlofssonska villan, Borgholm	Villakvarteret 1	1			56.87715°N 16.64535°E	21300000012319
	Högby fyr	Hagaby 1:8, 1:55	3			57.14655°N 17.04720°E	21300000012343
	Högby stenkvarn	Högby 7:1	2			57.16295°N 17.01136°E	21300000012347
	Jöns-Lasses gård	Norra Bäck 9:1	4			56.68068°N 16.64985°E	21300000016999
	Kapelluddens fyr	Kläppinge 1:6	6			56.81982°N 16.84484°E	21300000012337
	Kronomagasinet, Borgholm	Engelen 1	1			56.88027°N 16.65227°E	21300000012307
	Kvarnstad	Kvarnstad 2:3	5			57.12413°N 17.00106°E	21300000012349
	Lilla Nyborg, Borgholm	Blåklinten 9, 12	4			56.87901°N 16.66131°E	21300000012293
	Per Ekströms villa, Borgholm	Villakvarteret 4	1			56.87754°N 16.64658°E	21300000012321
	Persnäs fattighus	Lundeby 2:5	1			57.06759°N 16.92043°E	21300000012353
	Sandviks kvarn	Stenninge 2:8	1			57.07236°N 16.85870°E	21300000012355
	Sjöbergska gården, Borgholm	Våren 6	1			56.88000°N 16.65809°E	21300000012324
	Vasahuset, Borgholms kungsgård	Borgholm 8:63	1			56.86764°N 16.65854°E	21300000012358
	Wollinska villan, Borgholm	Stranden 3, 4	1			56.87798°N 16.64621°E	21300000012316
	Ölands forngård	Norge 5, 6	4			56.87795°N 16.65924°E	21300000012311
	Långe Erik	Mellby 1:4	1			57.36702°N 17.09699°E	21300000012340

== Emmaboda Municipality ==
Image	Name	Premises	Number of buildings	Year built	Architect	Coordinates	ID
	Kyrkeby gård	Kyrkeby 4:1, 4:8, 4:10, 4:12	25			56.53884°N 15.60513°E	21300000012363

== Hultsfred Municipality ==
Image	Name	Premises	Number of buildings	Year built	Architect	Coordinates	ID
	Smalspårsjärnvägen Totebo-Virserum	Krysset 2, 3 m fl	2			57.32074°N 15.57647°E	21300000017527
	Fröreda storegård	Fröreda 7:3	7			57.40976°N 15.57046°E	21300000012368
	Hultsfreds järnvägsstation	Hultsfred 2:12	1			57.48653°N 15.84625°E	21300000016146

== Högsby Municipality ==
Image	Name	Premises	Number of buildings	Year built	Architect	Coordinates	ID
	Bötterums gästgivargård	Bötterum 8:1	3			57.09342°N 16.15541°E	21300000012378
	Bötterums tingshus	Bötterum 8:1, 2:9	7			57.09334°N 16.15619°E	21000001710527

== Kalmar Municipality ==
Image	Name	Premises	Number of buildings	Year built	Architect	Coordinates	ID
	Kvarteret Apotekaren 1, Kalmar/Handelsbanken	Apotekaren 1	1	1913		56.66328°N 16.36333°E	21300000012437
	Riksbanken i Kalmar	Bankmannen 1	1			56.66207°N 16.36187°E	21300000012493
	Kvarteret Borgmästaren 6, 7	Borgmästaren 5 previously Borgmästaren 6-7	none				21300000012445
	Kvarteret Borgmästaren 9	Borgmästaren 9	2			56.66319°N 16.36627°E	21300000012457
	Kvarteret Domprosten 1	Domprosten 1	2			56.66215°N 16.36442°E	21300000012459
	Kvarteret Landshövdingen 1	Landshövdingen 1	2			56.66276°N 16.36409°E	21300000012474
	Länsresidenset, Landsstatshuset, Kalmar	Landshövdingen 16	1			56.66314°N 16.36530°E	21300000012489
	Kvarteret Repslagaren 9	Repslagaren 9	1			56.66612°N 16.37071°E	21300000012467
	Kvarteret Rådmannen 2	Rådmannen 2	1			56.66375°N 16.36579°E	21300000012471
	Rådhuset, Kalmar	Rådmannen 5	1	1684–1690		56.66396°N 16.36643°E	21300000012499
	Kvarteret Borgmästaren 11	Borgmästaren 11 previously 2	1			56.66335°N 16.36621°E	21300000012443
	Posthuset, Kalmar	Guldfisken 2	1			56.66534°N 16.35713°E	21300000012484
	Appeltofftska huset	Rådmannen 1	1			56.66361°N 16.36562°E	21300000012399
	Castenska gården/Trappgavelhuset	Apotekaren 3	3	1667		56.66339°N 16.36398°E	21300000012402
	Dahmska huset	Borgmästaren 8, 12	3			56.66307°N 16.36635°E	21300000012406
	Ebbetorps säteri	Ebbetorp 5:5, 5:7 previously Ebbetorp 5:1	3			56.68129°N 16.25971°E	21300000012380
	Ekska gården, Kalmar	Borgmästaren 1	1			56.66329°N 16.36600°E	21300000012407
	Gamla brandstationen, Kalmar	Rådmannen 5 previously Rådmannen 4	1	before 1681		56.66388°N 16.36614°E	21300000012410
	Gamla Komministergården, Kalmar	Borgmästaren 10 previously Borgmästaren 3	1			56.66346°N 16.36638°E	21300000012411
	Gamla tyggården	Kakelmakaren 1	1			56.66513°N 16.37037°E	21300000012543
	Grimskär fort	Kvarnholmen 2:14 previously stg 1093	1			56.65222°N 16.37019°E	21300000012414
	Hantverkarhuset	Gästgivaren 5	3			56.66190°N 16.36388°E	21300000012418
	Henriksgården, Rinkaby	Rinkaby 8:49	4			56.65347°N 16.22270°E	21300000012388
	Hillska gården	Fältskären 6	4			56.66193°N 16.36382°E	21300000012425
	Höglundska husen	Krögaren 9, 17	2			56.66354°N 16.36798°E	21300000012463
	Kalmar slott	Slottet 1 previously stg 353	6			56.65804°N 16.35505°E	21300000012391
	Kalmar Teater	Teatern 3	1			56.66275°N 16.36017°E	21300000012521
	Klapphuset	Kvarnholmen 2:20 previously stg 2057	none				21300000012427
	Kreugerska huset	Bokbindaren 22	1			56.66534°N 16.36707°E	21300000012429
	Krusenstiernska gården	Cedern 4-5 previously stg 334	4			56.66031°N 16.34822°E	21300000012432
	Kullzénska huset	Åldermannen 1	4			56.66387°N 16.36279°E	21300000012433
	Ljungby sockenmagasin	Ljungbyholm 37:1	1			56.63287°N 16.17293°E	21300000012532
	Mühlenbruchska huset	Borgmästaren 5	none				21300000012476
	Nelsonska huset	Magistern 15	1			56.66450°N 16.36646°E	21300000012480
	Prostgården, Kalmar	Domprosten 6-7	2			56.66257°N 16.36583°E	21300000012488
	Rosenlundska huset	Borgmästaren 4	1			56.66356°N 16.36671°E	21300000012498
	Ryssbylunds gård	Ryssbylund 1:1	2			56.80812°N 16.36213°E	21300000012534
	Rådman Joen Sylvesters gård	Hattmakaren 7	none				21300000012500
	Sahlsteenska gården, Per Knutssons gård	Landshövdingen 17	5			56.66240°N 16.36415°E	21300000012502
	Kalmar Sjöfartsmuseum	Kakelmakaren 5	1			56.66517°N 16.37148°E	21300000012512
	Stadshuset, Kalmar	Magistern 15	1	1833–1835		56.66472°N 16.36625°E	21300000012396
	Stortorget, Kalmar	Kvarnholmen 2:1; Domkyrkan 1	none				21300000012514
	Villa Hertha	Kakelmakaren 4	1			56.66555°N 16.37104°E	21300000012526
	Villa Skansen	Skansen 2	none				21300000012531
	Wahlbomska huset	Rådmannen 6 previously Rådmannen 5	1	ca. 1660		56.66382°N 16.36596°E	21300000012524

== Mönsterås Municipality ==
Image	Name	Premises	Number of buildings	Year built	Architect	Coordinates	ID
	Harbergska gården	Strömsrum 2:7	2			56.91624°N 16.42943°E	21300000012554
	Hullgrenska gården	Strömsrum 2:6	2			56.91645°N 16.42920°E	21300000012557
	Modeerska handelsgården	Korpen 4	2			57.04479°N 16.44637°E	21300000012552
	Nyebogården	Nyebo 5:7	4			56.99623°N 16.36916°E	21300000012558
	Råsnäs herrgård	Råsnäs 1:7	4			56.99082°N 16.43520°E	21300000012562
	Skytteanska skolan	Ålem 5:1	1			56.95511°N 16.40212°E	21300000012565

== Mörbylånga Municipality ==
placeholder

== Nybro Municipality ==
Image	Name	Premises	Number of buildings	Year built	Architect	Coordinates	ID
	Hammarsmedjan, Orrefors	Orrefors 1:1	3			56.84126°N 15.74505°E	21300000027301

== Oskarshamn Municipality ==
Image	Name	Premises	Number of buildings	Year built	Architect	Coordinates	ID
	Fredriksbergs herrgård	Fredriksberg 1 previously stg 85, 86	7			57.26953°N 16.42698°E	21300000012590
	Ishults tingshus	Ishult 1:14	3			57.46818°N 16.29714°E	21300000012589
	Oskarshamns järnvägsstation	Oskarshamn 2:7	2			57.26259°N 16.45770°E	21300000016137
	Stenvillan, Vånevik	Vånevik 7:24 previously 7:16	2			57.18060°N 16.45340°E	21300000012586

== Torsås Municipality ==
Image	Name	Premises	Number of buildings	Year built	Architect	Coordinates	ID
	Bruatorps kvarn	Bruatorp 2:1 previously 1:1	1			56.43947°N 16.06710°E	21300000012583
	Olssonska gården, Torsås	Torsås 2:54	7			56.41196°N 15.99899°E	21300000015865

== Vimmerby Municipality ==
Image	Name	Premises	Number of buildings	Year built	Architect	Coordinates	ID
	Kvarteret Tjädern 3, Vimmerby	Tjädern 3	2			57.66621°N 15.85105°E	21300000012617
	Kvarteret Näktergalen 3, Vimmerby	Näktergalen 3	1			57.66603°N 15.85619°E	21300000012613
	Apelkullens banvaktarstuga	Blägda 1:16	6			57.61467°N 16.13547°E	21300000012595
	Borgmästaregården, Vimmerby	Orren 2	2			57.66640°N 15.84792°E	21300000012609
	Granqvistgården, Vimmerby	Ejdern 1	3			57.66573°N 15.85160°E	21300000012611
	Källängsparken	Vimmerby 3:3	none				21000001693741
	Rådmansgården, Vimmerby	Ripan 14	3			57.66577°N 15.85092°E	21300000012621
	Smalspårsjärnvägen Totebo-Virserum	Totebo 1:14 m. fl.	none				21000001642581
	Tenngjutargården	Ripan 8	3			57.66592°N 15.84944°E	21300000012622
	Tuna gård	Tuna 1:1	16			57.56512°N 16.13465°E	21300000012607
	Rådhuset, Vimmerby	Domherren 1	1			57.66528°N 15.85467°E	21300000012619
	Ösjöfors handpappersbruk	Kvill 11:2, 11:3 previously Norrhult 1:26, 1:27	7			57.75579°N 15.56671°E	21300000012600

== Västervik Municipality ==
Image	Name	Premises	Number of buildings	Year built	Architect	Coordinates	ID
	Kvarteret Hushållet 3, Västervik	Hushållet 3	2			57.75726°N 16.63714°E	21300000012688
	Rådhuset, Västervik	Rådhuset 1	1			57.75841°N 16.63676°E	21300000012716
	Kvarteret Skonaren 1, Västervik	Skonaren 1	1			57.76059°N 16.63567°E	21300000012695
	Kvarteret Smugglaren 1, Västervik	Smugglaren 1	4			57.75928°N 16.64095°E	21300000012703
	Kvarteret Torsken 1, Västervik	Torsken 1	1			57.76076°N 16.63628°E	21300000012707
	Kvarteret Torsken 2, 3, Västervik	Torsken 2, 3	2			57.76068°N 16.63613°E	21300000012709
	Aspagården	Västervik 4:15 previously område litt b.e.	2			57.75977°N 16.63348°E	21300000012660
	Båtsmansstugorna	Båtsmannen 7-11, 14-19	13			57.75710°N 16.64213°E	21300000015870
	Cerderflychtska fattighuset	Hjälparen 2 previously 1	1			57.75905°N 16.63409°E	21300000012662
	Lunds by	Lunden 1:6	1			57.71043°N 16.44700°E	21000001704501
	Enanderska huset	Basaren 5	1			57.75836°N 16.63807°E	21300000012663
	Fårhults järnvägsstation	Fårhult 2:27	4			57.73751°N 16.42067°E	21300000012625
	Goldkuhlska huset	Briggen 10	2			57.76009°N 16.63590°E	21300000012667
	Gården vid Sankta Gertruds kyrka	Västervik 4:16 previously stg 1261	1			57.75988°N 16.63359°E	21300000012668
	Helgerums slott	Helgerum 1:16	4			57.62755°N 16.59436°E	21300000012724
	Jernska gården	Sjökaptenen 13	2			57.75762°N 16.64285°E	21300000012671
	Kollbergska gården	Torsken 5	3			57.76077°N 16.63610°E	21300000012674
	Kvarteret Gäddan 1, Västervik	Gäddan 1 previously Gäddan 2	2			57.76029°N 16.63629°E	21300000012677
	Kvarteret Skonaren 3, Västervik	Skonaren 3	2			57.76073°N 16.63537°E	21300000012700
	Lunds by	Lunden 1:2, 1:6-7, 1:13, 1:37, 1:40-41, 3:1	21			57.71067°N 16.44544°E	21300000012630
	Maechelska huset	Gäddan 1	none				21300000012711
	Norénska gården	Torsken 6	3			57.76089°N 16.63588°E	21300000012714
	Ravenäs	Ravenäs 1:1	2			58.07480°N 16.51452°E	21300000012654
	Spårö båk	Västervik 4:28	1			57.71429°N 16.72496°E	21300000003129
	Smalspårsjärnvägen Totebo-Virserum (sträckan Verkebäck-Totebo med byggnader)	Ankarsrum 2:1 m fl	10			57.70023°N 16.40555°E	21300000019520
	Smalspårsjärnvägen Totebo-Virserum (sträckan Jenny-Verkebäck)	Västervik Böljerum 3:12	none				21000001642621
	Prästgården, Västervik	Prosten 11	3			57.75906°N 16.63347°E	21300000012715
	Västerviks stationshus	Västervik 2:9	3			57.75569°N 16.64363°E	21300000012721
	Åkerholms herrgård	Åkerholm 1:1	3			57.91951°N 16.51779°E	21300000012633
	Överums herrgård	Överum 1:266	3			57.98699°N 16.32147°E	21300000012742
