= List of runic inscriptions on Öland =

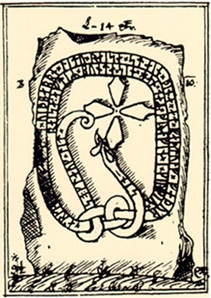
Bjärby stone, Öland 36, from a drawing by Johannes Haquini Rhezelius 1634.

Runic inscriptions are found throughout the Swedish island of Öland. Numbering and abbreviations are done in agreement with Rundata.

== Öland's runic inscriptions ==
- Öl 1, Karlevi Runestone
- Öl 18, Seby, Segerstads socken
- Öl 21, Hulterstads kyrka, Hulterstads socken
- Öl 22, Hulterstads kyrka, Hulterstads socken se Öl 21
- Öl 25, Björnflisan, utanför Dröstorp på Alvaret, runestone
- Öl 26, Sandby kyrkogård, Sandby socken, runestone
- Öl 27, Sandby kyrkogård, Sandby socken, runestone
- Öl 28, Gårdbystenen vid Gårdby kyrka, Gårdby socken, runestone
- Öl 29, Gårdby kyrka, Gårdby socken, runestone fragment
- Öl 31, Runstens kyrka, sakristian, Runstens socken
- Öl 36, Bjärbystenen, Runstens socken, runestone
- Öl 37, Lerkaka, Runstens socken (mittemot kvarnraden)
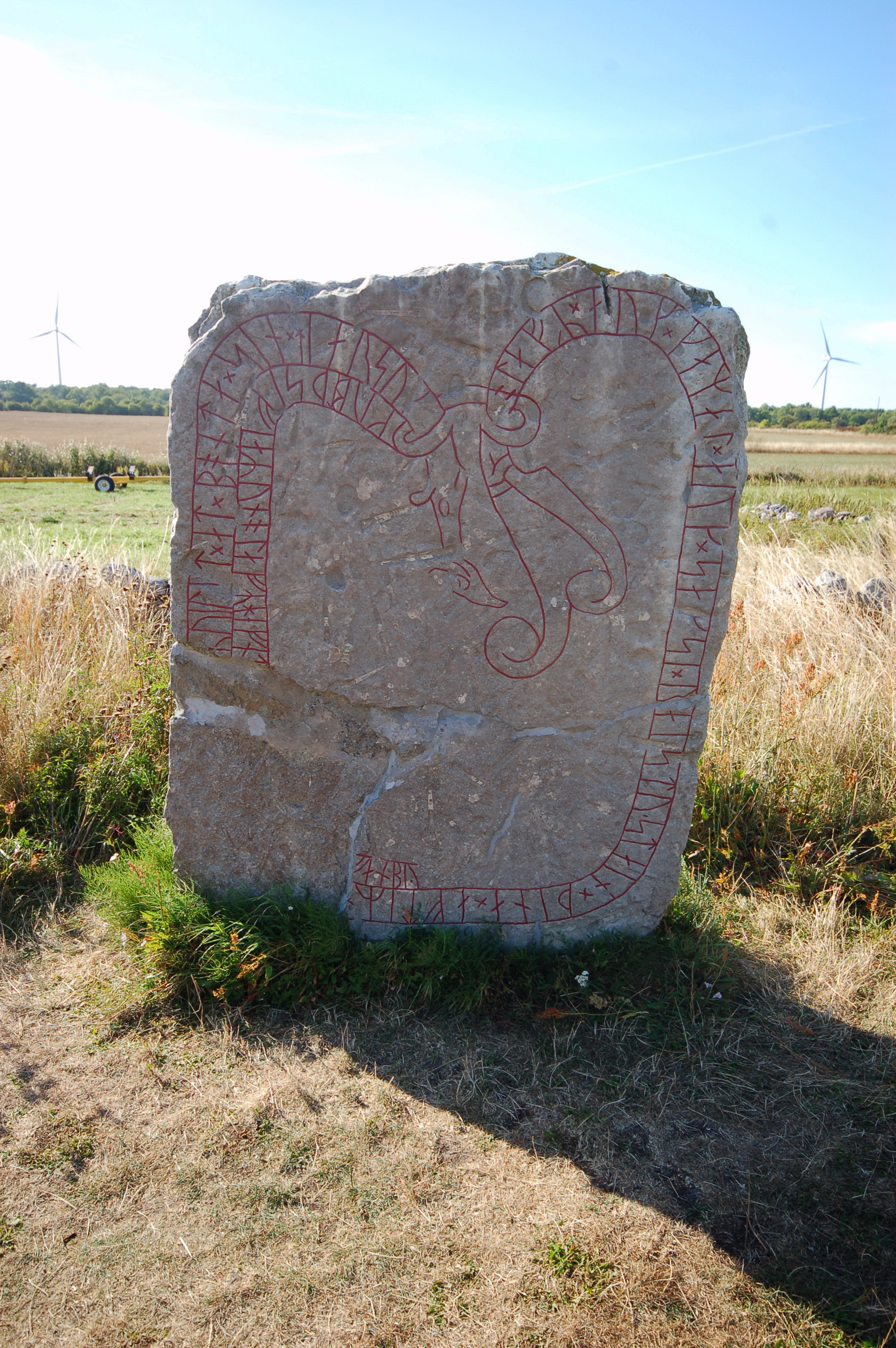
  Lerkaka - Öl 37, in memory of Rika Unn
- Öl 39, Övra Bägby, Gärdslösa socken, (stenen söder om bäcken)
- Öl 40, Övra Bägby, Gärdslösa socken, (stenen norr om bäcken)
- Öl 43, Gärdslösa kyrka, vapenhuset, Gärdslösa socken, runestone fragment
- Öl 44, ursprungligen från Bo, Bredsättra socken, now in the Skedemosse museum
- Öl 46, Tingsflisan, Köpings socken, runestone
- Öl ATA4684/43B, Hulterstads kyrka, see Öl 21
- Öl ATA4701/43, Alböke kyrka (intill ytterväggen)
- Öl ATA4703/43, Solberga Köpings socken
- Öl Fv1972;268, medeltida putsristning i Gärdslösa kyrka, Gärdslösa socken
- Öl KALM1982;57, Mörbylånga kyrka. Mörbylånga socken
- Öland runic inscription Köping, de 69(?) runstensfragmenten i Köpings kyrka

== External links, references ==
- FMIS sökning: Öland, Runristning
- Christer Hamp: Gamla Runinskrifter#Öland
- www.olanningen.com/fornlamningar/runstenar.htm
- Söderberg, Sven; Erik Brate (1900-1906). Sveriges runinskrifter: I. Ölands runinskrifter. Stockholm: Kungl. Vitterhets Historie och Antikvitets Akademien. ISSN 0562-8016. LIBRIS 148319
- Nilsson, Bruce: The Runic Inscriptions of Öland (1973), Akademisk avhandling. University of Michigan
