= Kapelludden Lighthouse =

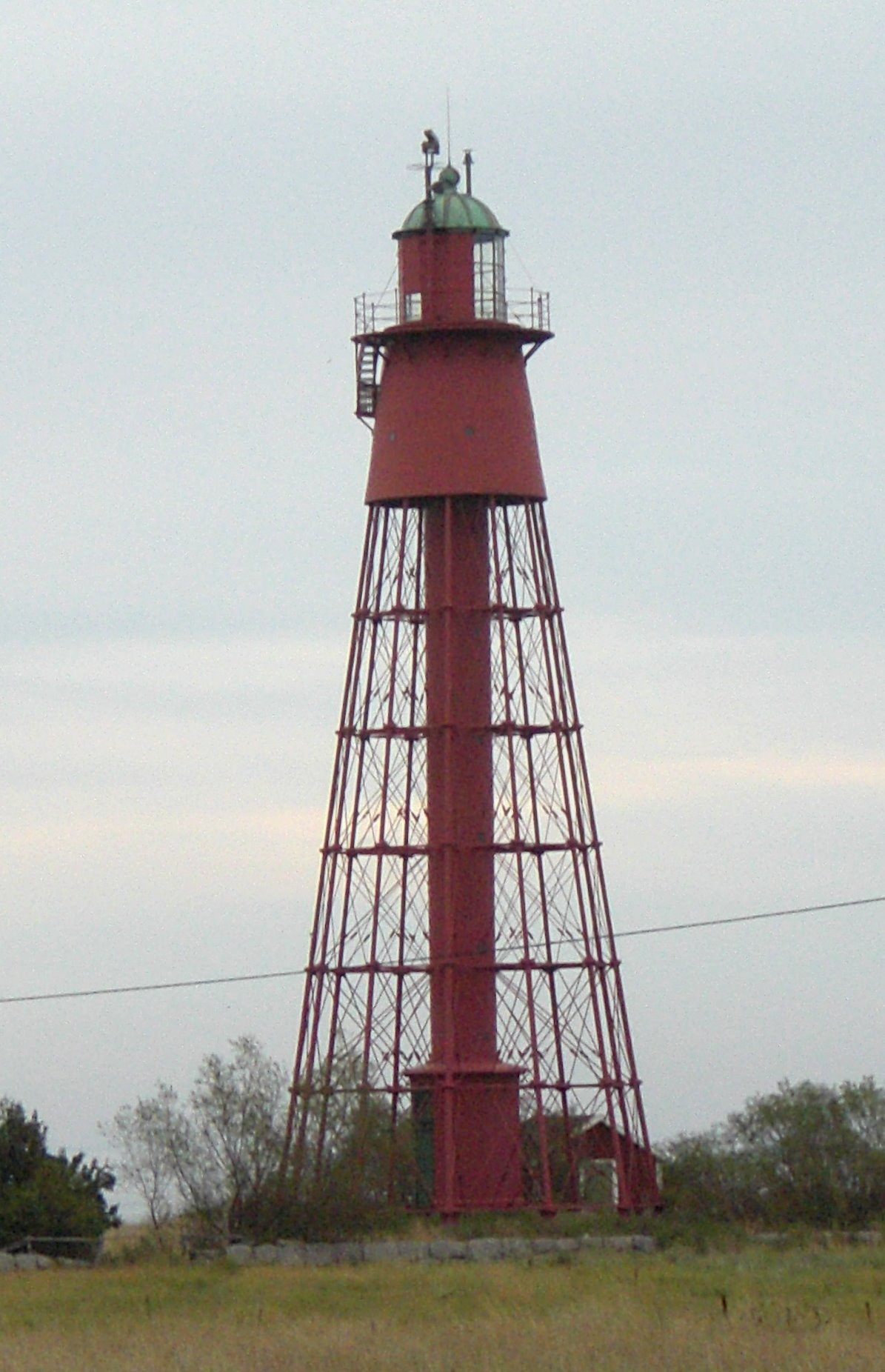
- Kapelludden lighthouse
- Location: Kapelludden; Öland; Sweden
- Coordinates: 56.819549°N 16.845077°E

Tower
- Constructed: 1872
- Construction: cast iron tower
- Automated: 1967
- Height: 32 metres (105 ft)
- Shape: square pyramidal skeletal tower with observation room, balcony, lantern and central cylinder
- Markings: red tower, grey lantern dome
- Power source: rapeseed oil, kerosene, electricity
- Operator: Swedish Maritime Administration (Sjöfartsverket)
- Heritage: governmental listed building complex, governmental listed building
- Racon: K

Light
- Focal height: 29.7 metres (97 ft)
- Lens: second order Fresnel lens (–1967), third order Fresnel lens (1967–)
- Range: 12.5 nautical miles (23.2 km; 14.4 mi)
- Characteristic: LFI W 10s.
- Sweden no.: SV-5498

Kapelludden Lighthouse, at Kapelludden on the east coast of the Swedish island of Öland, was built and lit in 1871. It is located in a wetland near the ruin of a 13th-century chapel, in Bredsättra socken, Borgholm Municipality.

The lighthouse is 32 meters high and was built by A.T. Gellerstedt.

== See also ==
- List of lighthouses and lightvessels in Sweden
- Långe Erik, the lighthouse at the north cape of Öland
- Långe Jan, the lighthouse at the south cape of Öland
