= Neptune's fields =

Nature reserve in Kalmar, Sweden

Coordinates: 57°20′57″N 17°1′56″E

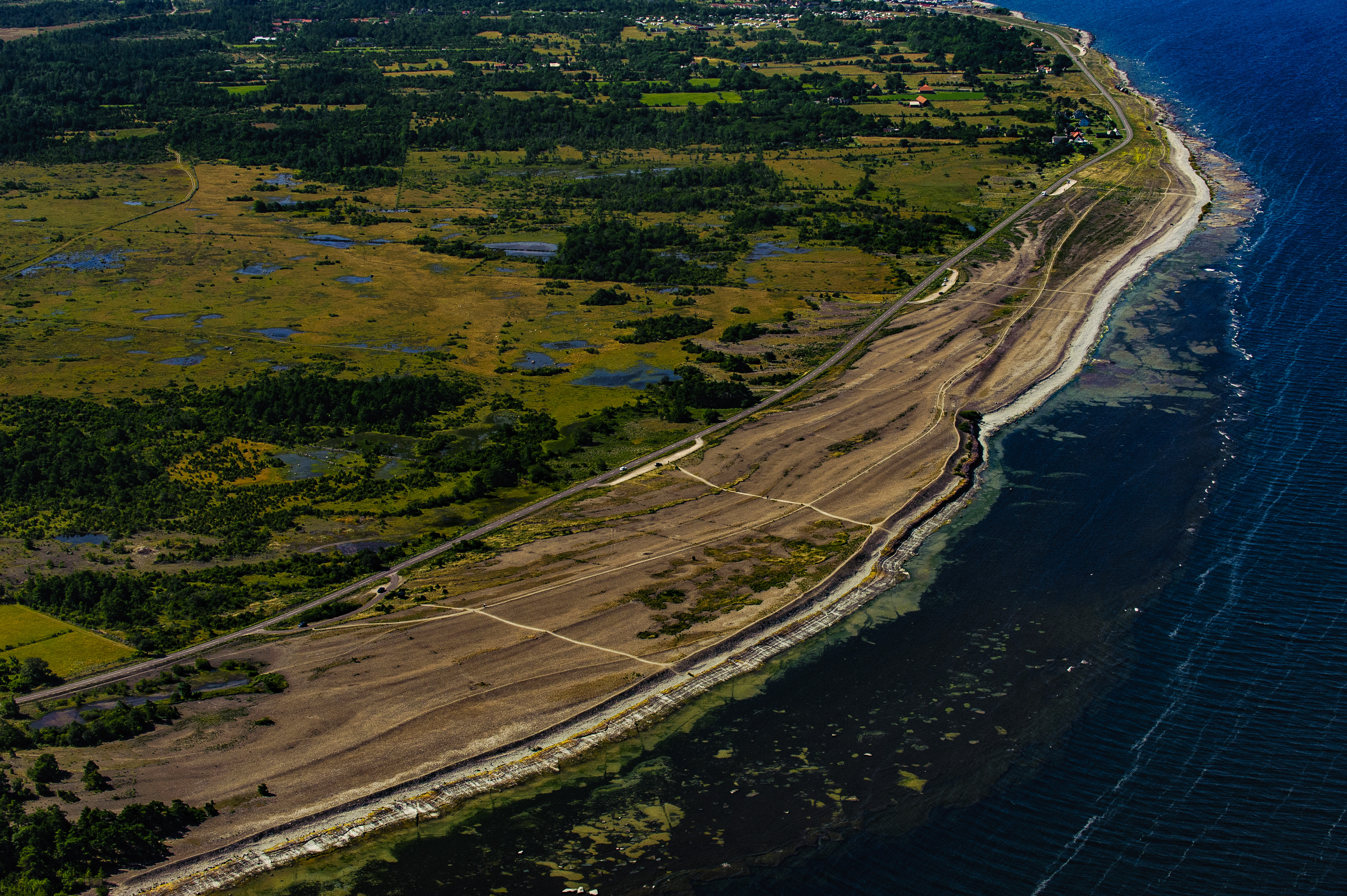
Neptune's fields protected natural area, 2009

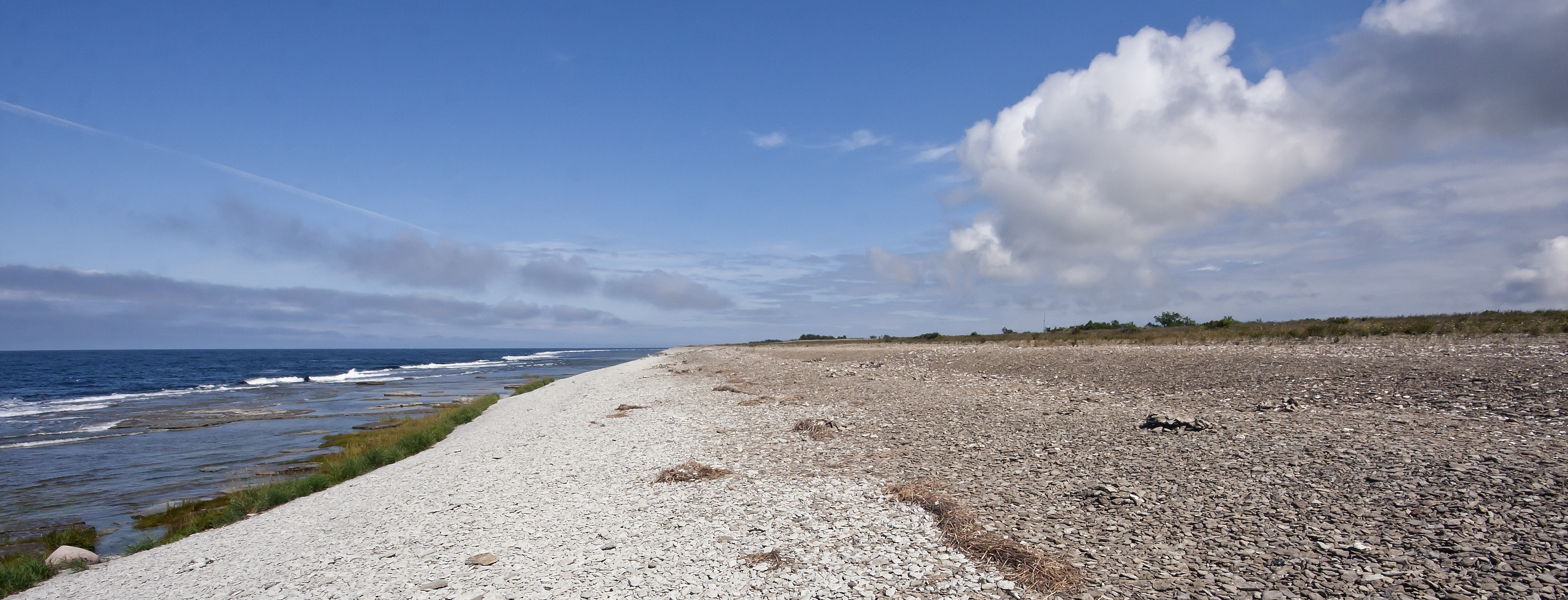
Neptune's fields in July. Photo by David Castor.

Neptune's fields (Swedish: Neptuni åkrar) is a nature reserve in the north of the island of Öland, Sweden. Located in Borgholm Municipality along the Kalmar Strait, north of the village of Byxelkrok, it consists of a long stretch of cobble beach covered with Echium vulgare which blossoms in June and July, coloring the entire area blue. The cobble stones result from stones left during the last ice age that eroded through the action of the waves, and they are interspersed with fossils from Trilobites and Brachiopods.

The place is a well-known tourist attraction. It was named by Carl Linnaeus, who visited the place on his 1741 journey to the island.

== Tumulus and gravefield ==
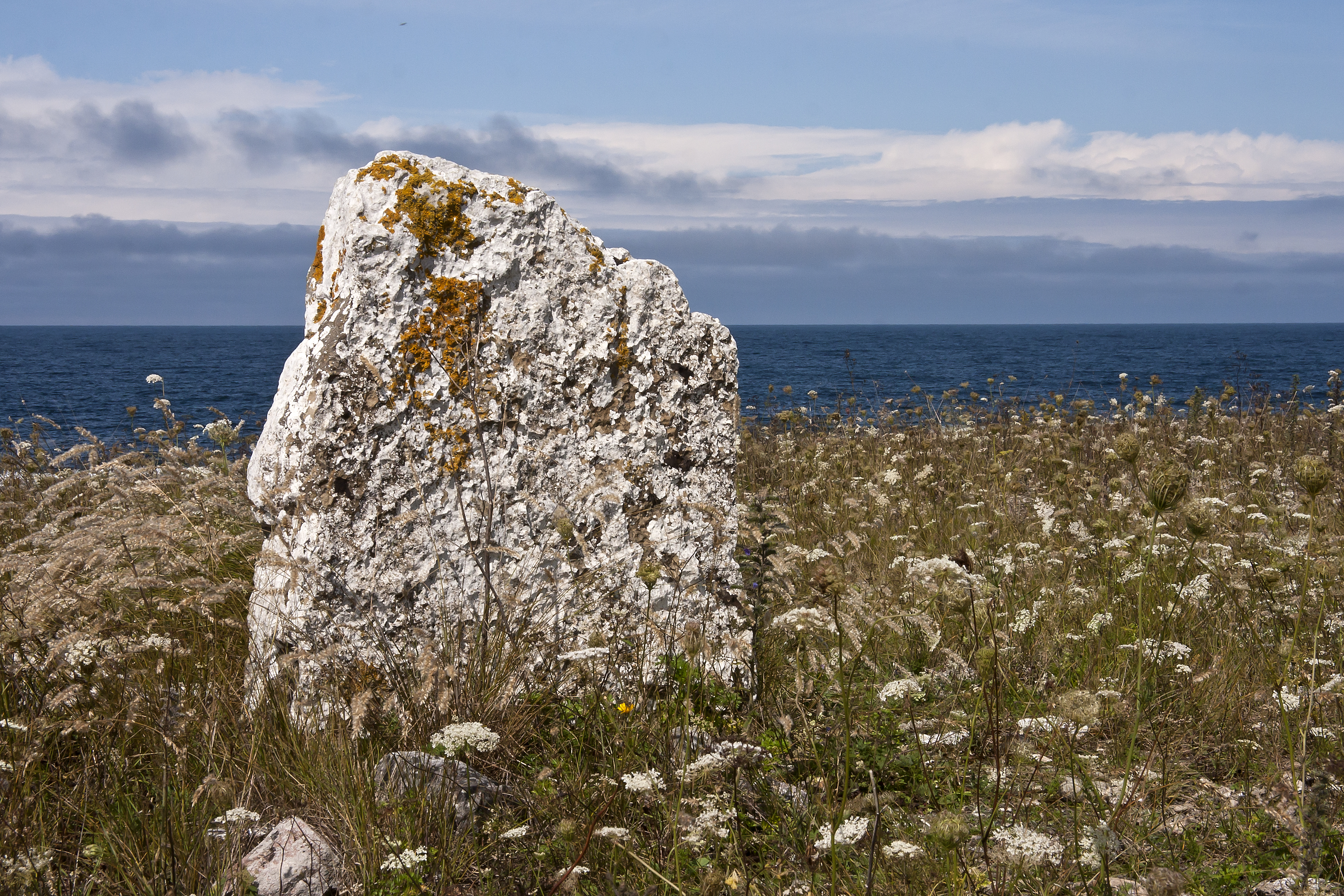
Standing stone at Neptune's fields

Just south of the Neptune's fields is the Forgalla Skepp, a Bronze Age ship shaped tumulus, and a grave field. The latter measures 150 by 30 m (492 by 98 ft) and contains 32 small stone circles, nine cists, twelve round cairns, and one in the shape of a three pointed star (treudd).

A bit further south, just a kilometer north of Byxelkrok, is Höga Flisa (the Tall Shard), a 1.70 m (5.6 ft) high limestone.
