= Kolstad =

Kolstad is a surname of Norwegian origin. Notable people with the surname include:

- Allen Kolstad (1931–2008), American farmer and politician from Montana
- Dean Kolstad (born 1968), Canadian former professional ice hockey defenceman
- Derek Kolstad (born 1974), American screenwriter and film producer
- Eva Kolstad (1918–1999), Norwegian politician for the Liberal Party
- Hal Kolstad (born 1935), American former pitcher in Major League Baseball
- Henki Kolstad (1915–2008), Norwegian actor
- Jonas Ueland Kolstad (born 1976), Norwegian football goalkeeper
- Lasse Kolstad (1922–2012), Norwegian actor
- Peder Kolstad (1878–1932), Norwegian politician from the Agrarian Party
- Per Kolstad (born 1953), Norwegian musician

== See also ==
- Kolstad, Trondheim, a neighborhood in the Heimdal borough in Trondheim, Norway
  - Kolstad IL, a multi-sports club from that city
  - Kolstad Håndball, a handball club from that city
- Kolstad, Finspångs
- Kolstad (Öland), Öland
