= Saint Birgitta's chapel =

Coordinates: 56°49′10″N 16°50′42″E

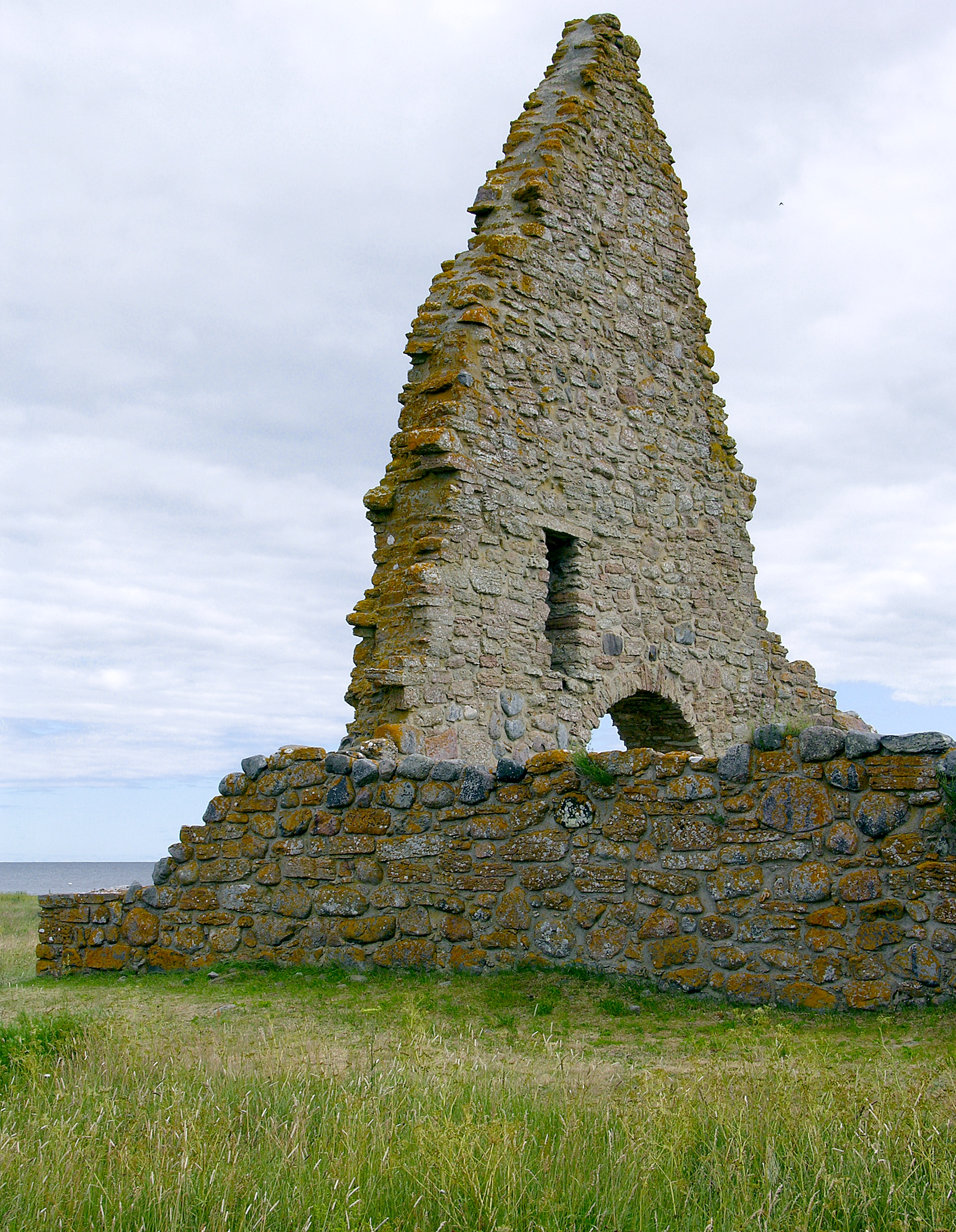
Chapel ruins, eastern wall

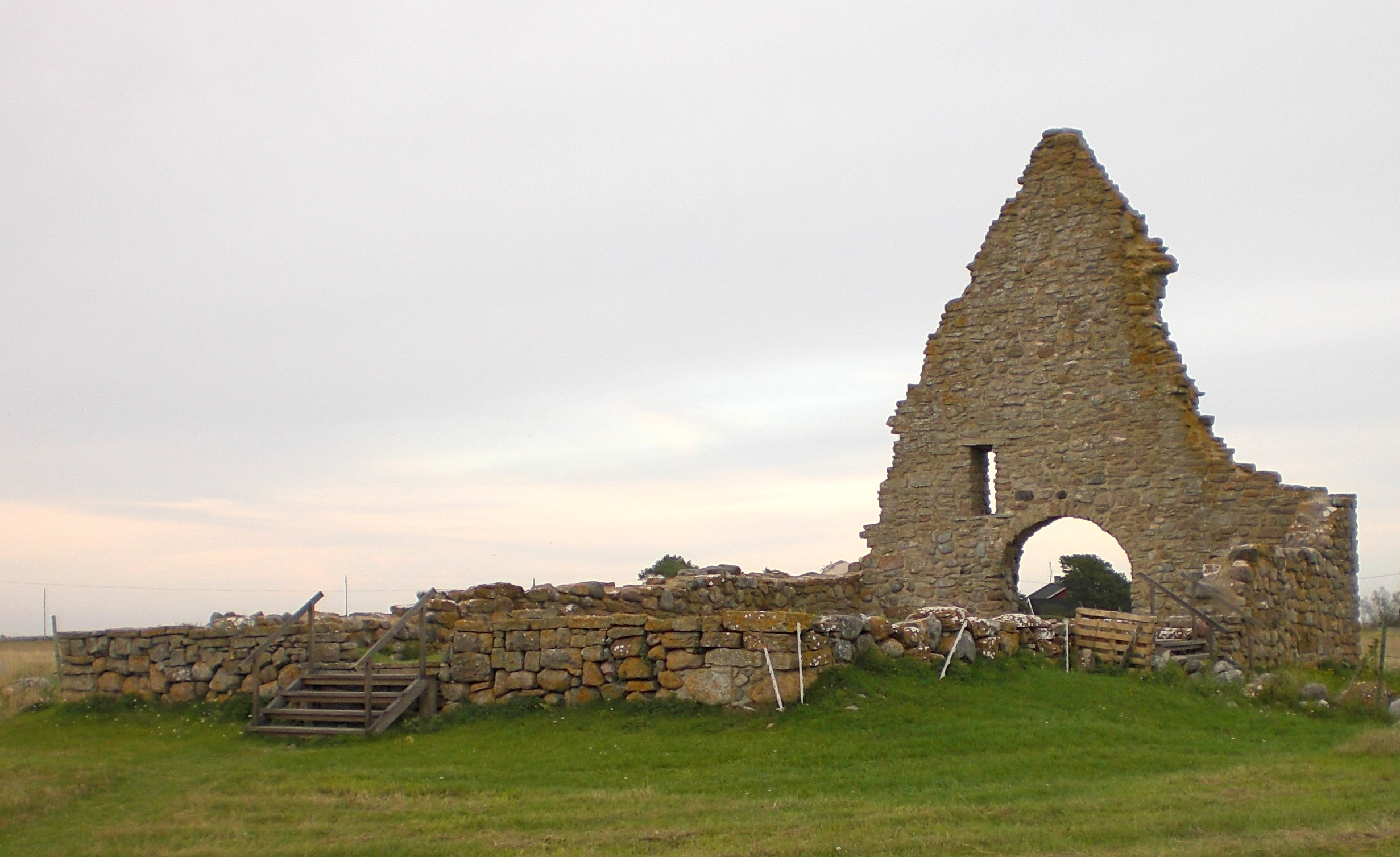
Eastern wall from the west

Saint Birgitta's chapel (Swedish: Sankt Britas kapell) is located on the east coast of the island of Öland, Sweden, some four kilometers from the village of Bredsättra in Bredsättra socken, Borgholm Municipality, in a marshy area called Kapelludden. The chapel dates from the 13th century; today nothing remains but the foundation and the eastern wall, the western wall having fallen down during a storm in 1914.

== History and description ==
The church (not a parish church) was built in the first part of the 13th century under the auspices of the bishop of the Diocese of Linköping, which included the islands of Gotland and Öland. The chapel belonged to one of the largest churches of its time on the island. It had a large nave (only the churches at Köpingsvik and Hulterstad had larger naves) and a slightly smaller choir, and a small vestry on the north end. The high roof probably created space for lodging pilgrims (that this was a pilgrimage church is suggested also by the dimensions of the nave), and the church was surrounded by a wall, enclosing an area of 67 × 55 meters, including a cemetery. In the southeast corner is a spring, which was probably used already in prehistoric times.

The building is first mentioned in 1515 and was probably abandoned during the Reformation. The saint for whom the chapel is named is most likely Brigit of Kildare (451–525), an Irish saint who was particularly venerated in the Linköping diocese, rather than Bridget of Sweden (1303–1373). English traveler Horace Marryat visited the area and the church in the early 1860s ("a ruined chapel of grey stone – two peaked gables – a graceful ruin"), who recounts the legend of Ingeborg Bengtsdotter, landing in this spot with her child, the future Bridget of Sweden, after a shipwreck: Ingeborg and her husband Birger Persson had gone on a pilgrimage to Kildare, to the remains of St. Brigit, and their ship sank off the Öland coast on the return voyage to Sweden.

== Cross ==
A stone cross was placed in the 13th century between the chapel and the beach, 3 meters high and 1.9 meters wide, with clover-shaped cross ends. There is a hole in the cross, supposedly intended for a hook on which to hang the offerbössa. The cross is surrounded by a wall 12 meters in diameter. Excavations in 1978 revealed it was made of limestone, with entrances north and south. A storm in 2007 blew over a neighboring shed, which in turn broke the cross in four pieces; it was restored, reinforced with steel beams, in October 2007. According to Horace Marryat, local lore has it that the cross marks the spot where Bridget of Sweden first set foot on the island.

== Literature ==
- Andreas Hassler, Schweden Handbuch, Edgar Hoff Verlag 2001, ISBN 3-923716-10-9, p. 266
