= Bredsättra Church =

- Bredsättra kyrka
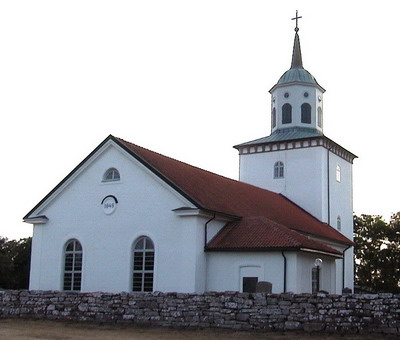
- Bredsättra Church, external view]

- Location in Kalmar County
- 56°50′41″N 16°47′38″E
- Location: Bredsättra socken
- Country: Sweden
- Denomination: Church of Sweden

Administration
- Diocese: Växjö

Bredsättra Church (Swedish: Bredsättra kyrka) is a Lutheran church in Bredsättra socken on the Swedish island Öland, in the Baltic Sea. It belongs to the Diocese of Växjö.

== History and architecture ==
The oldest part of the now visible church is the tower, dating from the 13th century and originally designed also as a defensive tower. The church was heavily reconstructed during the 19th century. The present nave dates from 1848, as do the spire of the tower. The church houses several medieval furnishings. The baptismal font is a Romanesque piece of art. The triumphal cross is later, Gothic in style. The church also has two carved wooden statues depicting female saints from the 15th century; one depicts Catherine of Vadstena and the other an unknown saint. The altarpiece and pulpit both date from the 18th century.

Not far from the church lie he ruins of Saint Birgitta's chapel.
