= Ralla =

Ralla may refer to:

== Places ==
- North Liverpool Extension Line (known locally as the Ralla)
- Ralla, Punjab, a village in Mansa district, Punjab
- Rälla, a locality in Kalmar County, Sweden
