= Djupvik =

Village in Borgholm, Öland, Sweden

Coordinates: 57.022°N 16.835°E

Djupvik is a small village on the island of Öland, Sweden. It lies next to the road between Borgholm (15 km) and Byxelkrok. It belongs to the municipality of Borgholm.
