= Rälla tall =

Village in Borgholm, Sweden

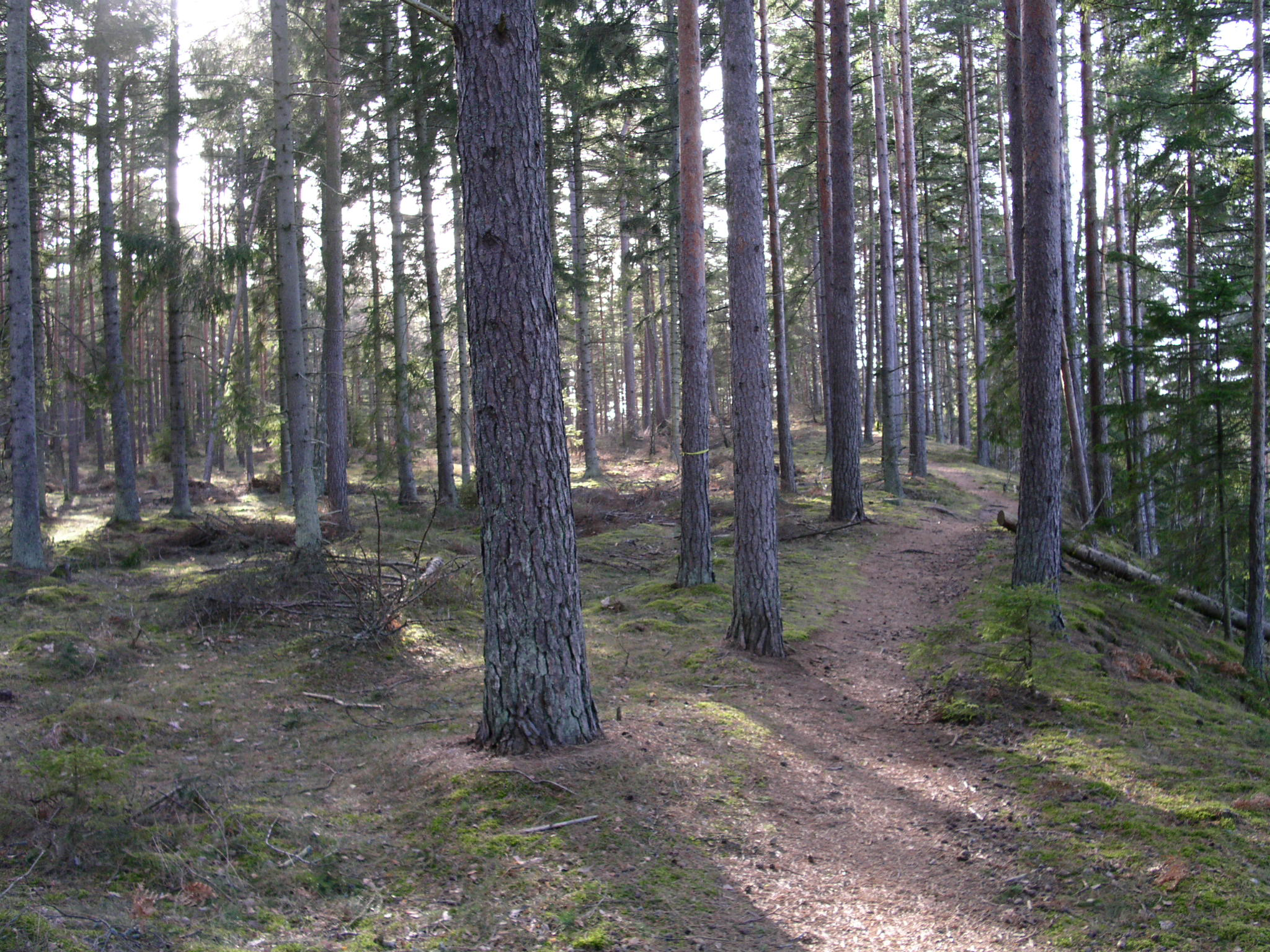
RällaTall

Rälla tall is a village in the municipality of Borgholm situated on the island of Öland and is part of the province Kalmar län in Sweden. The village has 72 inhabitants (2005).
