= Kapelludden =

Wetland in Öland, Sweden

Coordinates: 56°49′10″N 16°50′42″E

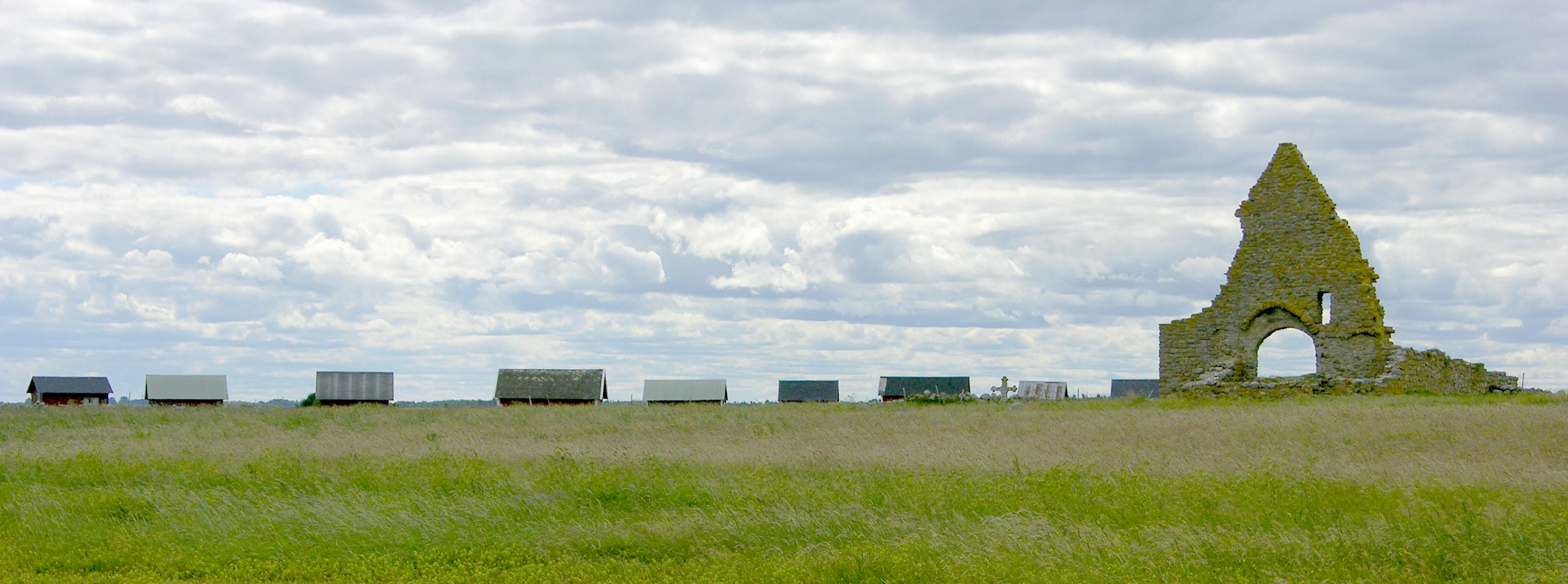
Fishing sheds and the ruins of a chapel dedicated to Saint Birgitta

Kapelludden is a wetland on the east coast of the island of Öland, Sweden, some four kilometers from the village of Bredsättra in Bredsättra socken, Borgholm Municipality. The area is rich in birdlife, and has important cultural remains (including the ruins of Saint Birgitta's chapel) and a functioning Kapelludden lighthouse.

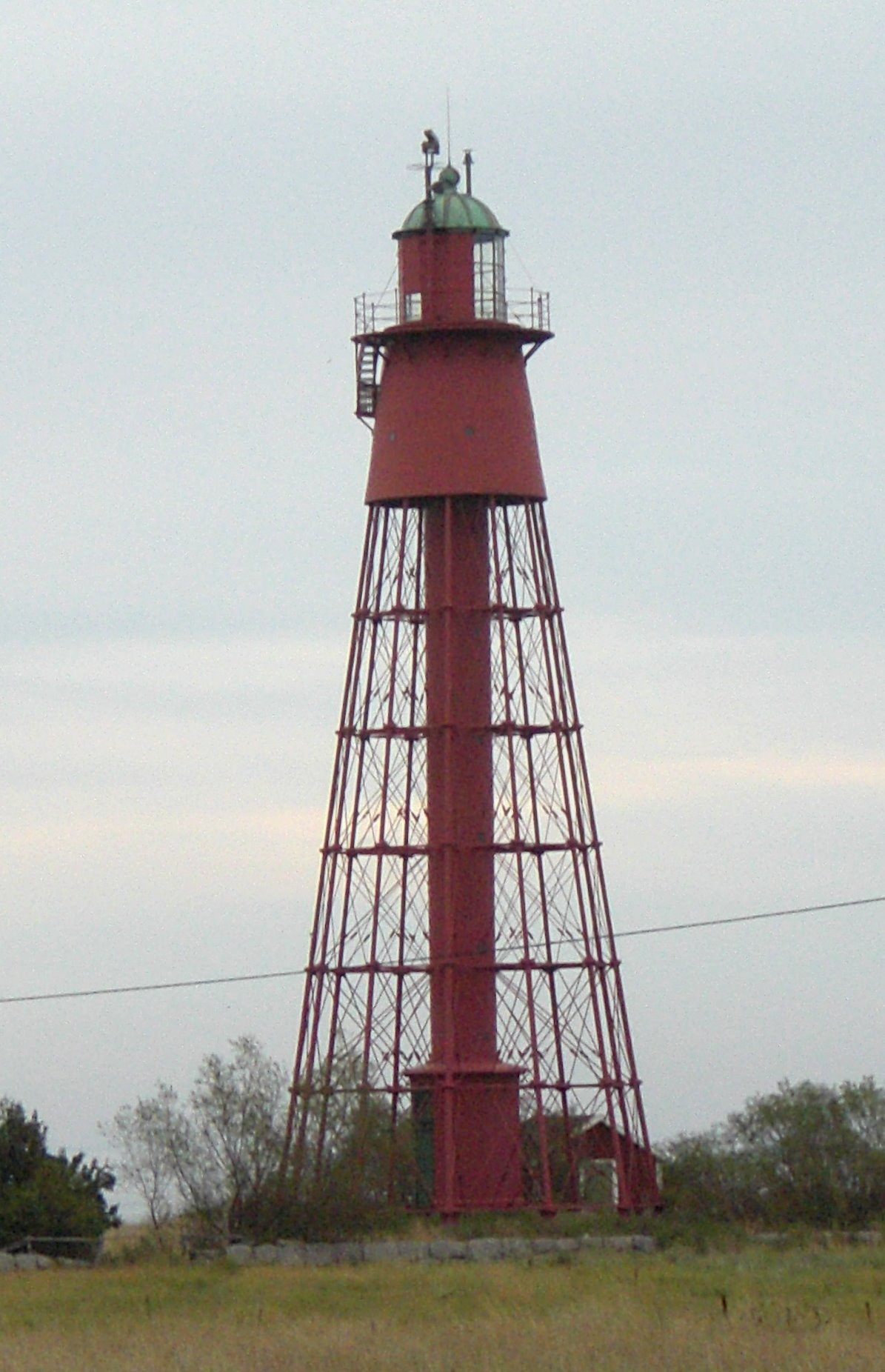
Kapelludden lighthouse

Called Sik(a)varp or Sikehamn, the place was already a settlement for fishers in the Middle Ages and a trade center of uncertain importance, though local legendary stories claim that the settlement was so important that John III of Sweden revoked the town's trading privileges after complaints from Borgholm and Kalmar.

== History ==
Whether the harbor of Sikvarp was really a commercially important place is not clear, and possibly exaggerated, especially since Johannes Haquini Rhezelius (d. 1666) describes it as a ruinous, derelict market town. No important ancient harbor structure appears to have existed, though there are remains of foundations and mounds.

Investigations in 1978 indicated mudflats, shallow pits lined with a layer of clay, and evidence was found of significant herring fisheries. The bishop of Linköping may have held the port in his private possessions, of strategic importance given the diocese's extensive land holdings to the west of Kapelludden.
