= Öland runic inscription 18 =

Runestone in Seby, Öland, Sweden

Coordinates: 56°20′37″N 16°31′52″E

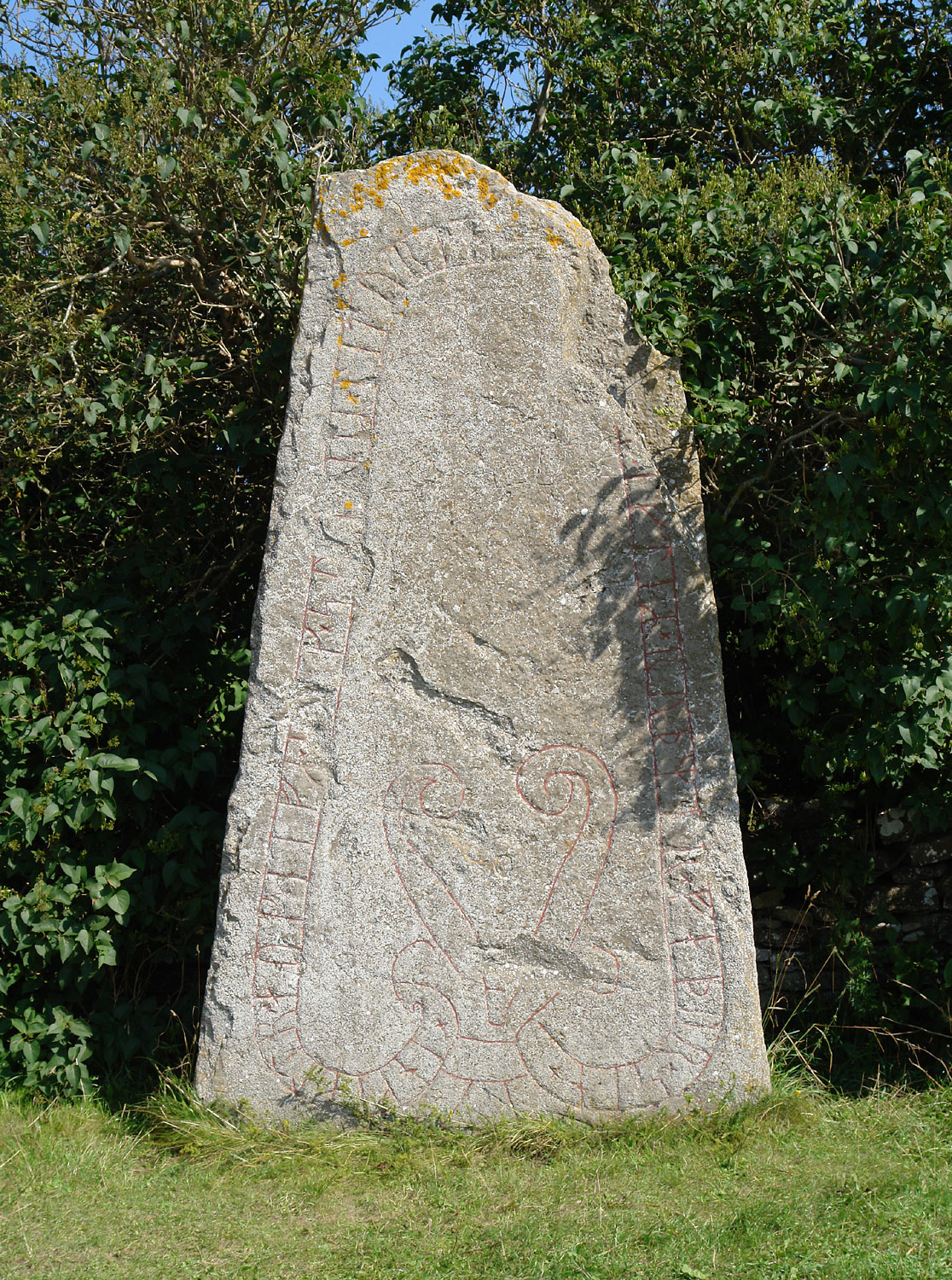
- Öl 18
- Discovered: Seby, Öland, Sweden
- Rundata ID: Öl 18

Öland runic inscription 18, or Öl 18 in the Rundata designation, is a runestone in Seby, in Segerstads socken on Öland, Sweden.

== Description ==
The runestone is made of limestone and is 3 meters tall and 1.75 meters wide. It is between 15 and 20 centimeters thick, with runes between 11 and 14 centimeters deep. The runes were colored in during 1966, 1974, and 1991; the damage on the corner already existed in 1634.

== Text ==
- Inscription: × inkialtr × auk × nifʀ × [au]k × su[i]n [× þa]iʀ × litu × risa ...- × iftiʀ × ruþmar × faþur × sin ×
- Transcription: Ingjaldr ok Nefr ok Sveinn, þeir létu reisa [stein] eptir Hróðmar, fôður sinn
- Translation: Ingjaldr and Nefr and Sveinn, they had this stone raised in memory of Hróðmar, their father

== See also ==
- List of runic inscriptions on Öland
- Runic alphabet
