= Blå Jungfrun =

Swedish island in the Baltic Sea

Blå Jungfrun National Park
- Blå jungfruns nationalpark
- IUCN category II (national park)
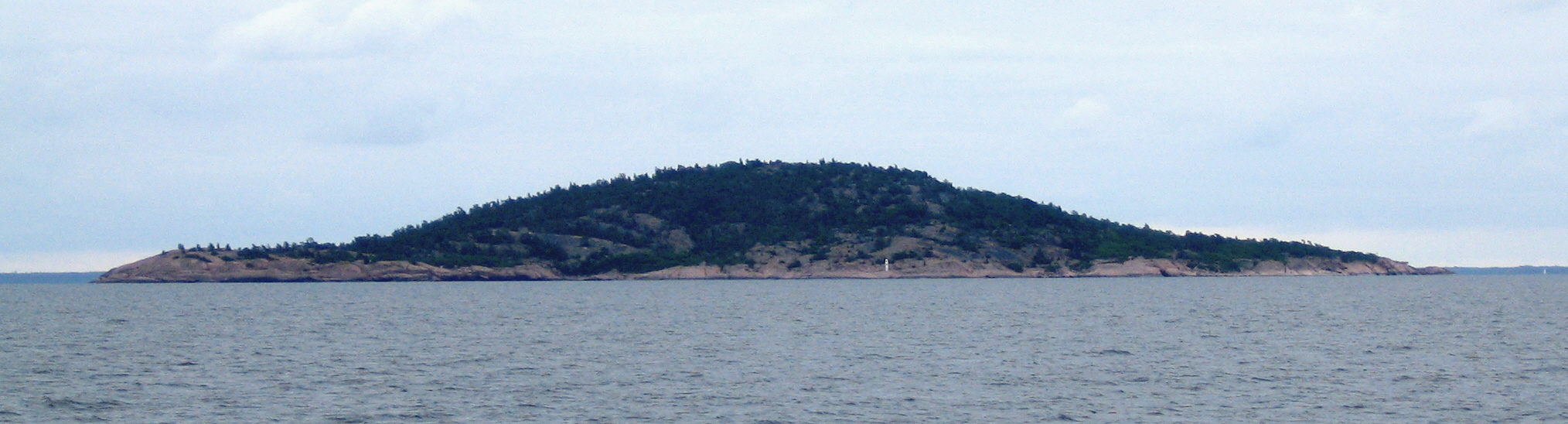
- Interactive map of Blå Jungfrun National Park
- Location: Kalmar County, Sweden
- Nearest city: Oskarshamn
- Coordinates: 57°15.1′N 16°47.6′E
- Area: 1.98 km^{2} (0.76 sq mi)
- Established: 1926, extended 1988
- Visitors: 9,700 (in 1976)
- Governing body: Naturvårdsverket
- Website: Swedish Environmental Protection Agency

National parks of Sweden (clickable map)

Blå Jungfrun, also known as "Blåkulla", in English sometimes rendered literally as The Blue Maiden is a Swedish island in the Baltic Sea. It is situated in the Kalmar Strait, between the mainland province of Småland and the island province of Öland. Administratively, the uninhabited island is part of the municipality of Oskarshamn and covers an area of approximately 0.7 km^{2} (0.27 mi^{2}) with a mean height above sea level of 86 m (282 ft). Home to black guillemots and a Swedish National Park since 1926, freedom to roam at Blå Jungfrun is limited with visitors prohibited from staying overnight on the island or making fires.

The island consists partly of bare rock with the remainder covered in dense hardwood forest. There are several caves and an ancient stone labyrinth from which it is forbidden to remove stones.

Geologically the island is an ancient inselberg rising from the Sub-Cambrian peneplain. After its formation in the Precambrian, Blå Jungfrun was buried in sandstone, which protected it from any further erosion, until it was finally freed from its sandstone cover in geologically recent times. In 2014 the island became object of archeological interest when a group of researchers discovered a cultural layer after probating the soil. At the time the authorities had given them the permission to only operate in a small area and could not take samples; three years later they were able to recover shards made out of quartz, which date to the Stone Age and had been probably produced by a settlement of hunter-gatherers. The exact age of the site remains uncertain, but it is estimated to have existed around 8500BC, about 10,000 years ago.

== Legends ==
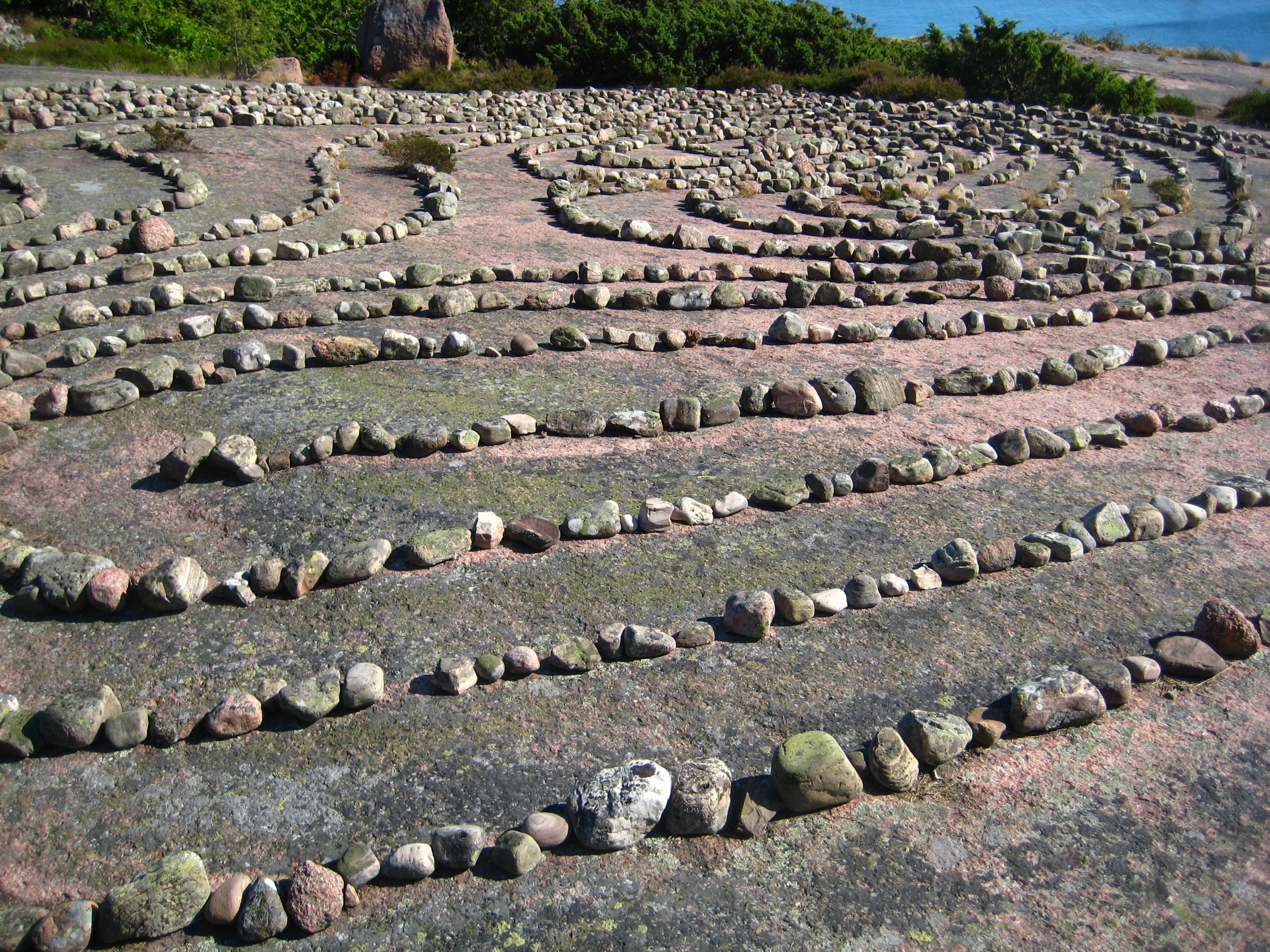
Detail of the stone labyrinth on Blå Jungfrun.

The island plays an important role in Swedish folklore, where it is viewed as an evil and magical place. The name Blå Jungfrun was originally used by sailors to avoid provoking the evil spirits who dwelt on the island. According to a widespread belief, related already by Olaus Magnus in 1555, witches meet there each Maundy Thursday. Carl Linnaeus, who visited the island in 1741, was sceptical:

Women and fairy-tales ... generally say that all witches will go here (truly a rather difficult journey) each Maundy Thursday; but those who have visited the place once are not likely to return, and should find out the reason for the fable: If any place in the world looks hideous, this is surely one of the most cruel.

== Modern traditions ==
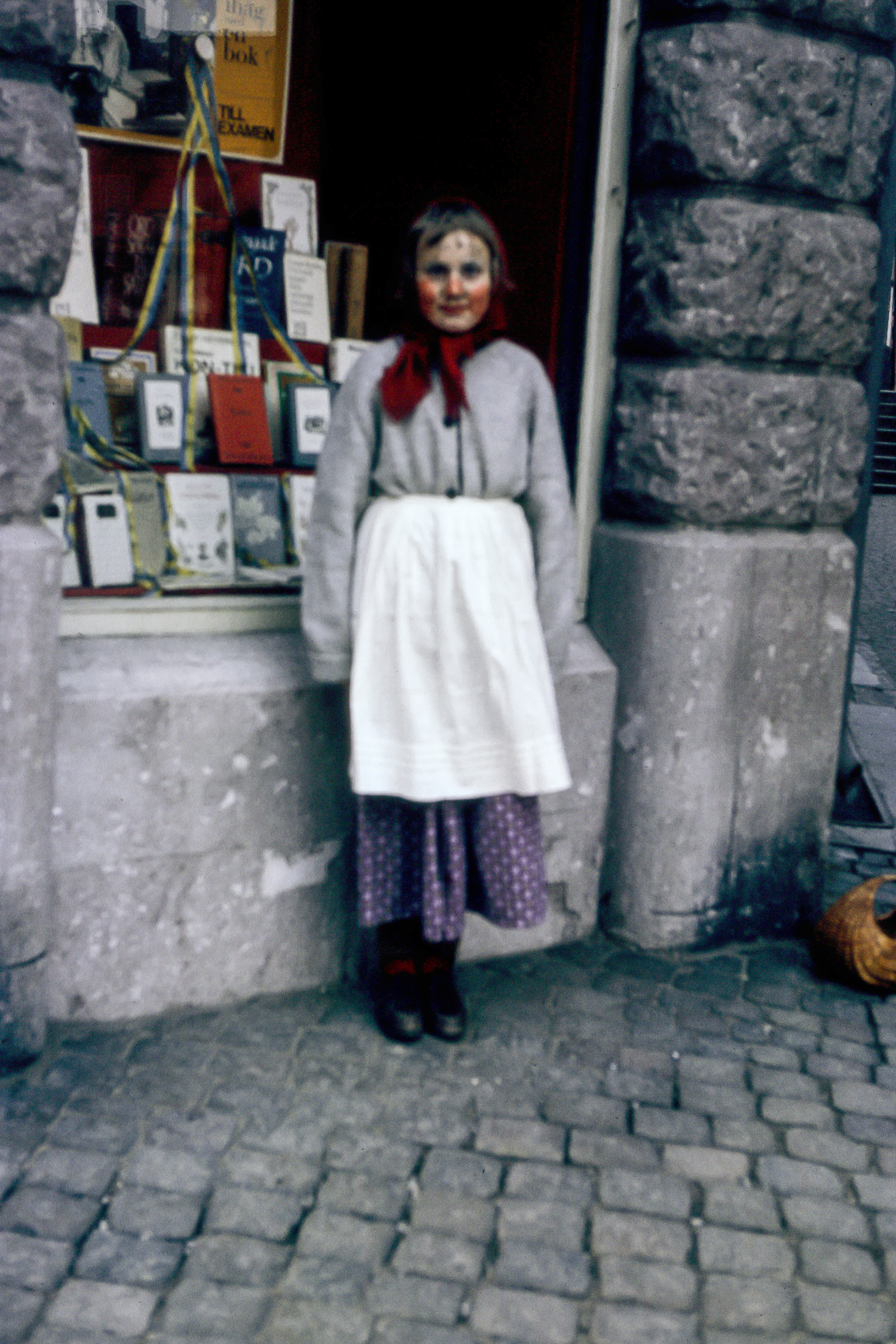
A girl dressed up as an Easter witch

In Sweden and Swedish-speaking parts of Finland, to commemorate the travel of witches to the legendary Blåkulla (synonymous in some traditions with Blå Jungfrun), children dress as witches, old women, and old men on Easter and go door-to-door for treats similar to the trick-or-treating tradition of Halloween. The children sometimes present hand-made cards and other greetings.

== Park establishment and tourism ==
Between 1904 and 1925 the red granite of Blå Jungfrun was extracted in three quarries on the south of the island. It was exported chiefly to Germany as decorative stone. The destruction led to efforts to protect the island. A donation from the Swedish entrepreneur Torsten Kreuger made it possible to acquire the island and stop the quarrying. The national park was established on February 5, 1926 by the Government of Sweden.

In summer, the island can be visited by tour boats from Oskarshamn or from Byxelkrok. Regular trips began in the 1950s. A park guide on Blå Jungfrun informs the visitors about the national park and its regulations. A visit to the island lasts for around 3,5 hours.

== See also ==
- Blockula
- Hagalund
- Brita Zippel
- Blå Jungfrun Östra lighthouse
- Cunning folk
