= Lofta =

Village in Öland, Sweden

Coordinates: 57.038°N 16.848°E

Lofta is a small village on the island of Öland, Sweden. It belongs to the municipality of Borgholm, in Kalmar County.
