= Åkerby-Lopperstad =

Coordinates: 56.681°N 16.689°E

Åkerby-Lopperstad is a village in the municipality Borgholm on the island Öland and the province Kalmar län in Sweden. The village had 73 inhabitants in 2010.
