= Öjkroken =

Coordinates: 56.873°N 16.769°E

Öjkroken is a village on the island Öland in Sweden. It belongs to the municipality Borgholm.
