= Uggletorp =

Coordinates: 58°33′N 14°04′E

Uggletorp is a village on the island of Öland. It lies next to the Swedish road 136. It belongs to the municipality of Borgholm.
