= Blå Jungfrun Östra Lighthouse =

Decommissioned lighthouse in Oskarshamn, Sweden

Blå Jungfrun Östra
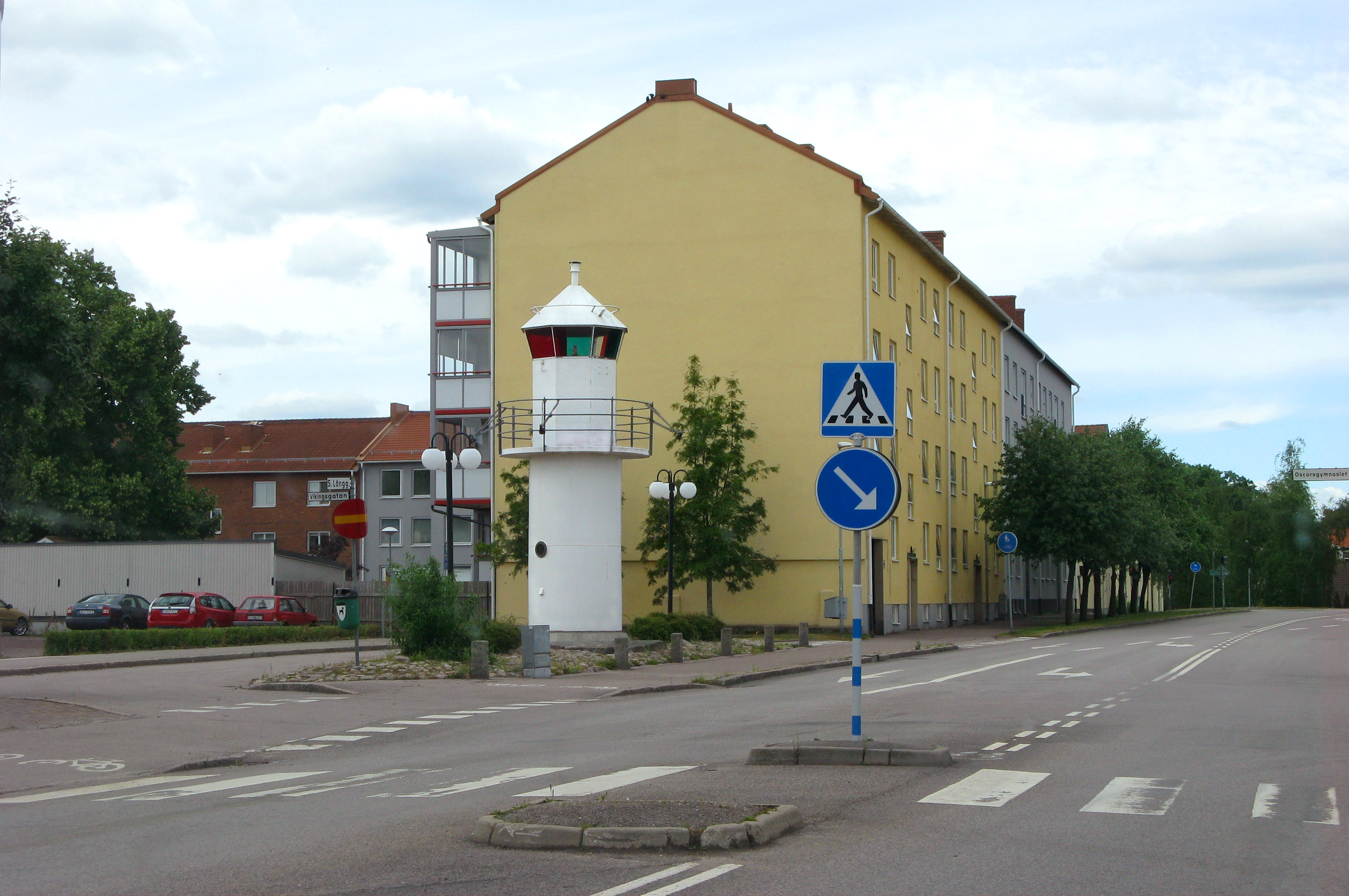
- The moved Blå Jungfrun Östra lighthouse
- Location: Oskarshamn; Kalmar County; Småland; Sweden
- Coordinates: 57°15′46.9″N 16°26′40.2″E

Tower
- Constructed: 1926 (first)
- Foundation: concrete
- Construction: concrete tower
- Height: 9.5 metres (31 ft)
- Shape: cylindrical tower with balcony and lantern
- Markings: white tower and lantern
- Operator: Oskarshamns Sjöfartsmuseum

Light
- First lit: 1956 (current)
- Deactivated: 2002
- Focal height: 12.2 m (40 ft)
- Range: 8 nautical miles (14,816 m)
- Characteristic: Fl W 8s.

Blå Jungfrun Östra is a lighthouse located in coastal town of Oskarshamn in Sweden, Europe.

== Deactivated and moved ==
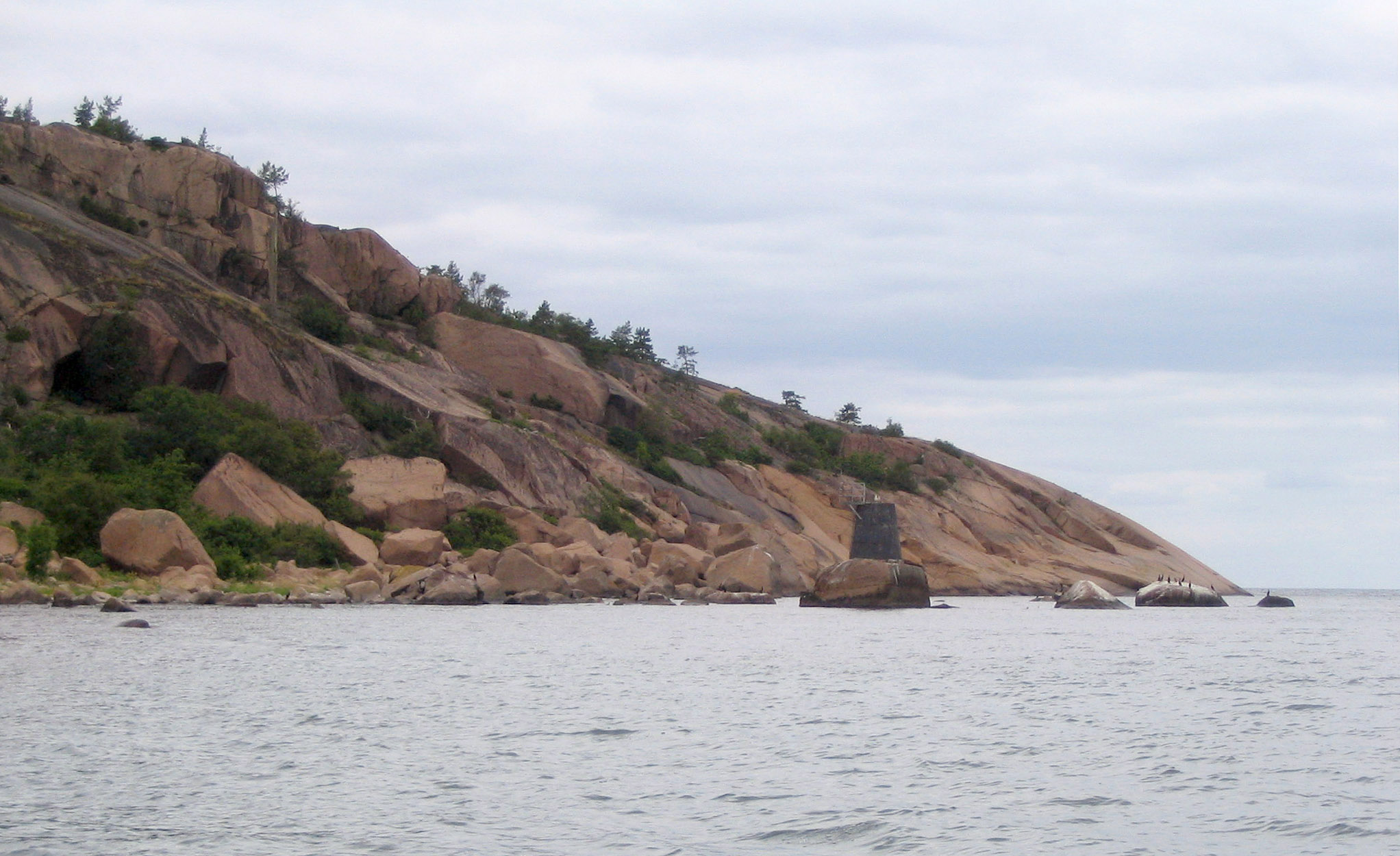
Photo of the original position of the lighthouse at 57°15.014′N 16°48.038′E. The foundation can still be seen at the eastern shoreline of national park Blå Jungfrun.

Lighthouse Blå Jungfrun Östra was originally located on the island and national park Blå Jungfrun in the Baltic Sea about 10 nautical miles outside Oskarshamn. After being deactivated by the Swedish maritime authorities, Sjöfartsverket, in 2002, the lighthouse was disassembled and moved into the city of Oskarshamn. It now serves as an attraction and a landmark on street Södra Långgatan in Oskarshamn.

== See also ==
- List of lighthouses and lightvessels in Sweden
