= Lindby (Borgholm) =

Former settlement in Borgholm, Sweden

Lindby Lindby
- Former settlement
- Interactive map of Lindby
- Coordinates: 56.8169°N 16.7006°E
- Country: Sweden
- Municipality: Borgholm

Population
  - Total: 60
- Time zone: UTC+1 (Central European Time)
  - Summer (DST): UTC+2 (Central European Summer Time)

Lindby is a village in the municipality Borgholm on the island Öland and the province Kalmar län in Sweden. The village has 60 inhabitants (2005).
