= Källingemöre =

Coordinates: 56.9167°N 16.7833°E

Källingemöre is a village on the island Öland in Sweden. It belongs to the municipality Borgholm.
