= Marsjö =

- Coordinates: 57°02′N 16°51′E
- Country: Sweden
- County: Kalmar County
- Municipality: Borgholm Municipality

Marsjö is a small village on the Swedish island of Öland. It is in Borgholm Municipality.
