= Åstad =

Coordinates: 56.7500°N 16.7000°E

Astad is a village with less than 50 inhabitants (2005) on the island of Öland, Kalmar County, Sweden. It belongs to the municipality Borgholm.
