= Kalleguta =

Village in Borgholm Municipality, Sweden

Coordinates: 56°53′N 16°47′E

Kalleguta is a small village on the island of Öland, Sweden. It lies in the inland of the island. It belongs to Borgholm Municipality.
