= Löttorp =

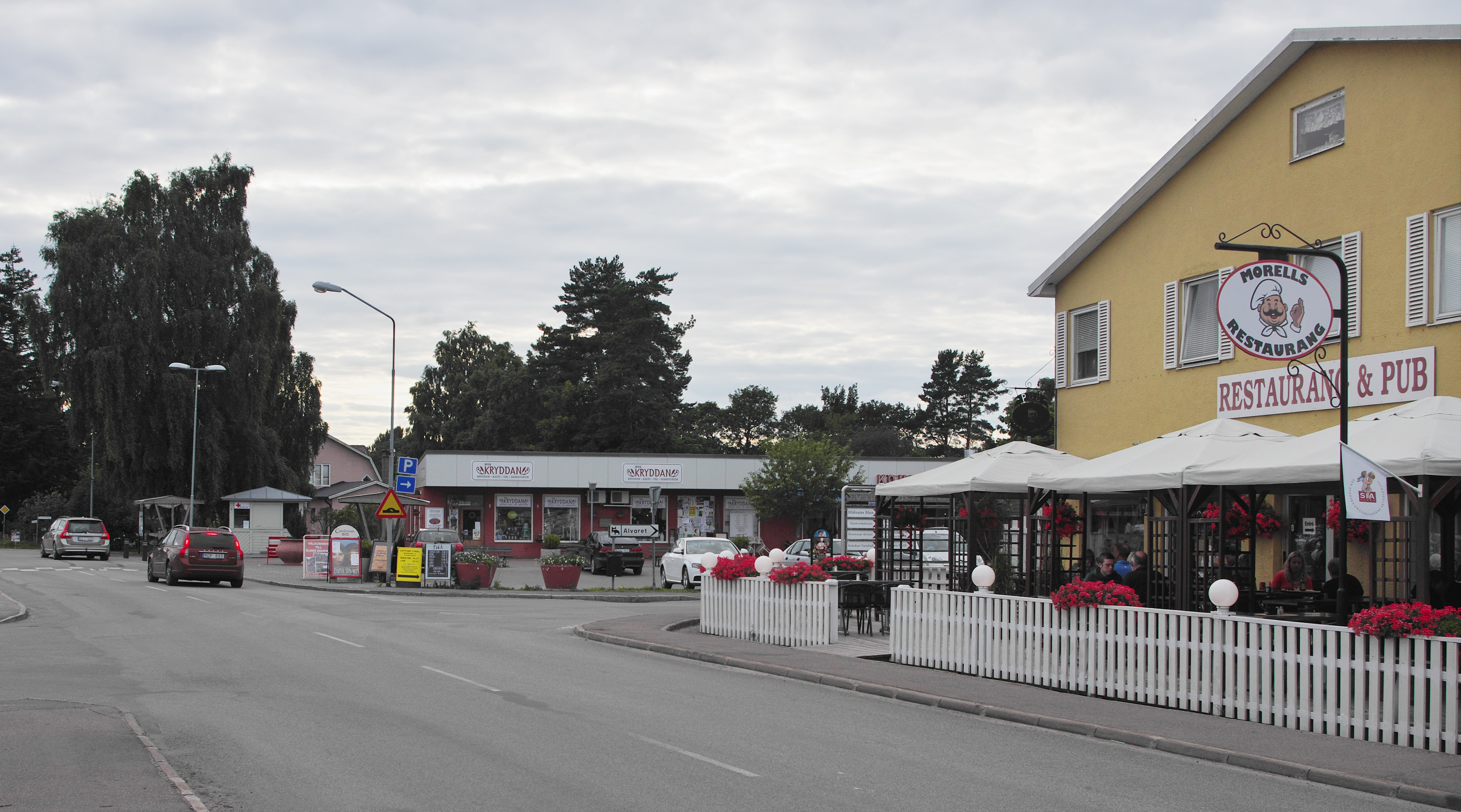

- Location within Kalmar Location within Sweden
- Coordinates: 57°10′N 16°59′E
- Country: Sweden
- Province: Öland
- County: Kalmar County
- Municipality: Borgholm Municipality

Area
  - Total: 1.28 km^{2} (0.49 sq mi)

Population (31 December 2010)
  - Total: 438
  - Density: 343/km^{2} (890/sq mi)
- Time zone: UTC+1 (CET)
  - Summer (DST): UTC+2 (CEST)

Löttorp (Swedish pronunciation: [ˈlœ̌tːɔrp]) is a locality situated in Borgholm Municipality, Kalmar County, Sweden with 438 inhabitants in 2010. It is connected to the church village Högby on Route 136.

Löttorp provides a number of services for the northern part of the municipality, since the municipality's center, Borgholm, is 40 kilometres (25 mi) away. It has an elementary and middle school, and a library.

== See also ==
- Vedborm
