= Bredsättra socken =

Administrative division of Runsten Hundred, Öland, Sweden

Coordinates: 56.8447°N 16.7939°E

Bredsättra socken is a former socken of Runsten Hundred on Öland, Sweden. Since 1974, it has been part of Borgholm Municipality. It covers 29.11 square kilometers and had 251 inhabitants in 2000.

== History ==
Bredsättra Church dates back to the 12th century, with a west tower added in 1202–1207. The church was heavily rebuilt during the 19th century but retains several medieval furnishings. Bredsättra socken is mentioned first in a letter from c. 1320, and another from 1346. It had a harbor town of some importance, Sikehamn, during the Middle Ages, from which limestone was exported.

After the municipal reform in 1862, the responsibility for the ecclesiastical and civil organization of the socken was transferred to the Bredsättra parish and landskommun (rural municipality), respectively. The latter was incorporated into Öland's Köpingsvik district in 1952, and this in turn was incorporated into Borgholm Stad in 1969 and then Borgholm Municipality in 1971. In 2006 the parish became part of the Köpingsvik Assembly.

== Geography ==
Bredsättra is located in the eastern part of the island, on mostly bare, plain ground.

== Archeology ==
The socken has some 200 archeologically important sites, many of them Iron Age burial grounds. Runestone Öl 44 is held in the Skedemosse museum.

== Sites of interest in Bredsättra socken ==
- Kapelludden, a marshland on the coast with a lighthouse
- Saint Birgitta's chapel, the ruins of a 13th-century chapel at Kapelludden

== See also ==
- Mörbylånga
