= Gillberga =

Coordinates: 57.114°N 16.911°E

Gillberga is a small village on the island of Öland, Kalmar County, Sweden. it belongs to the municipality of Borgholm.
