= Sörby (Öland) =

Village in Borgholm Municipality, Sweden

Coordinates: 56°49′0″N 16°44′0″E

Sörby is a village in the municipality of Borgholm within the island province of Öland and the county of Kalmar in Sweden. It is in Gärdslösa socken. As of 2005 the village had 59 inhabitants.

The name of the settlement appears as Söderby in older sources. One possible etymology is that it is "south" (Swedish: söder), but there is no obvious centre to the north to which this might refer; another suggestion is that it derives from a word such as sur or sörjig (damp, slushy) and meant a marshy area.

In 1540 the village was part of the lands of the Diocese of Linköping and had 3½ dwellings and 6 smallholdings; in 1544 there were 4 freeholders, one of them Gustav Vasa.

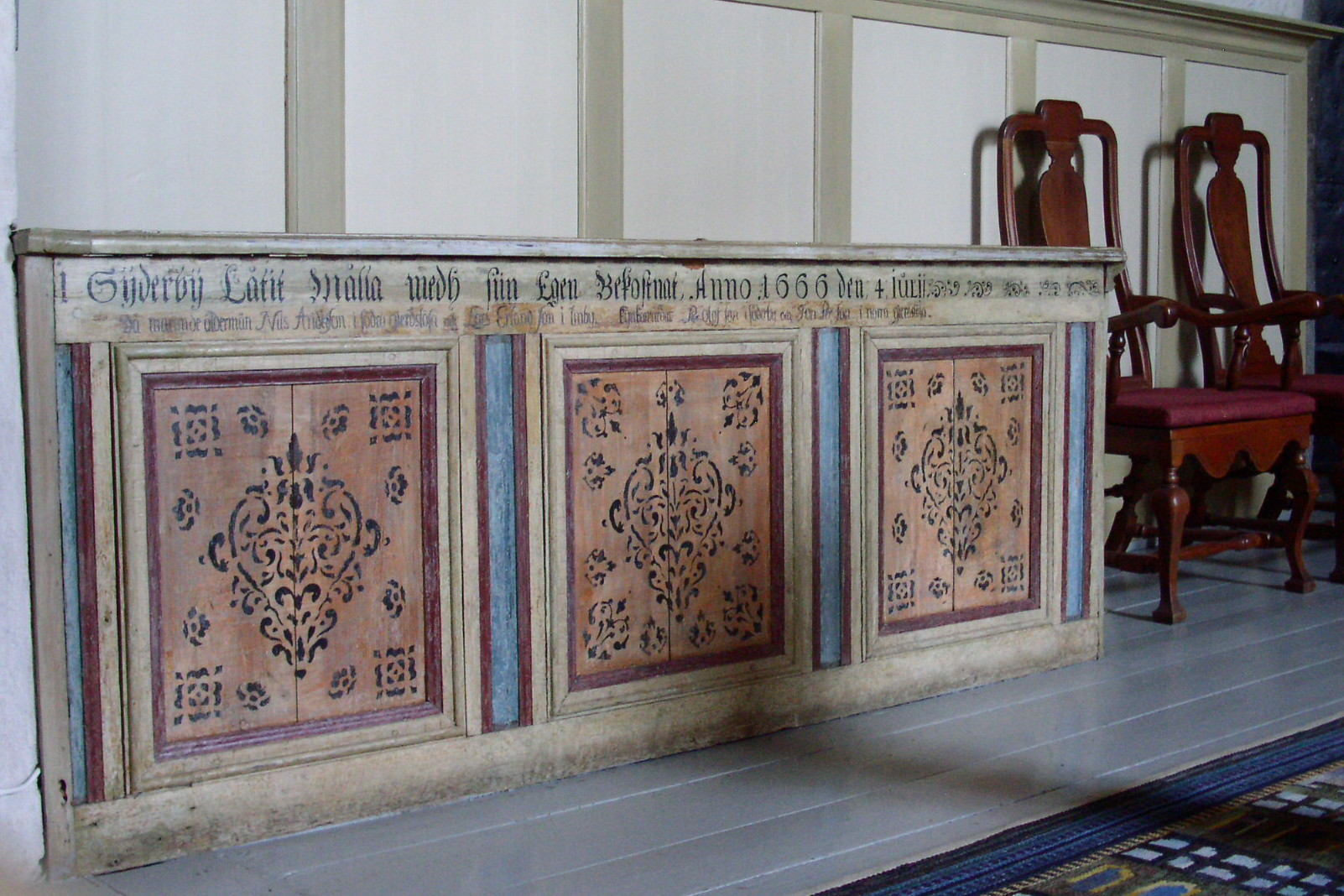
Painted pew in Gärdslösa Church: the village name is written Syderby on the left.
