= Enerum =

Village in Sweden

Coordinates: 57.309°N 16.991°E

Enerum is a small village on the island Öland. It belongs to the municipality Borgholm.
