= Störlinge =

Coordinates: 56°48′N 16°44′E

Störlinge is a village on the island of Öland in the municipality of Borgholm, Kalmar County, Sweden. The village has 58 inhabitants (2005).
