= Dödevi =

Village in Öland, Sweden

Coordinates: 57.2000°N 17.0500°E

Dödevi is a small village on the island of Öland in Sweden. It lies next to the route 136. The village belongs to the municipality of Borgholm.
