= Kvarnstad =

Village in Borgholm Municipality, Sweden

Coordinates: 57.1333°N 16.9833°E

Kvarnstad is a small village on the island Öland, Sweden. It belongs to the municipality Borgholm.
