= Triberga =

Village on Öland, Sweden

Coordinates: 56°28′N 16°34′E

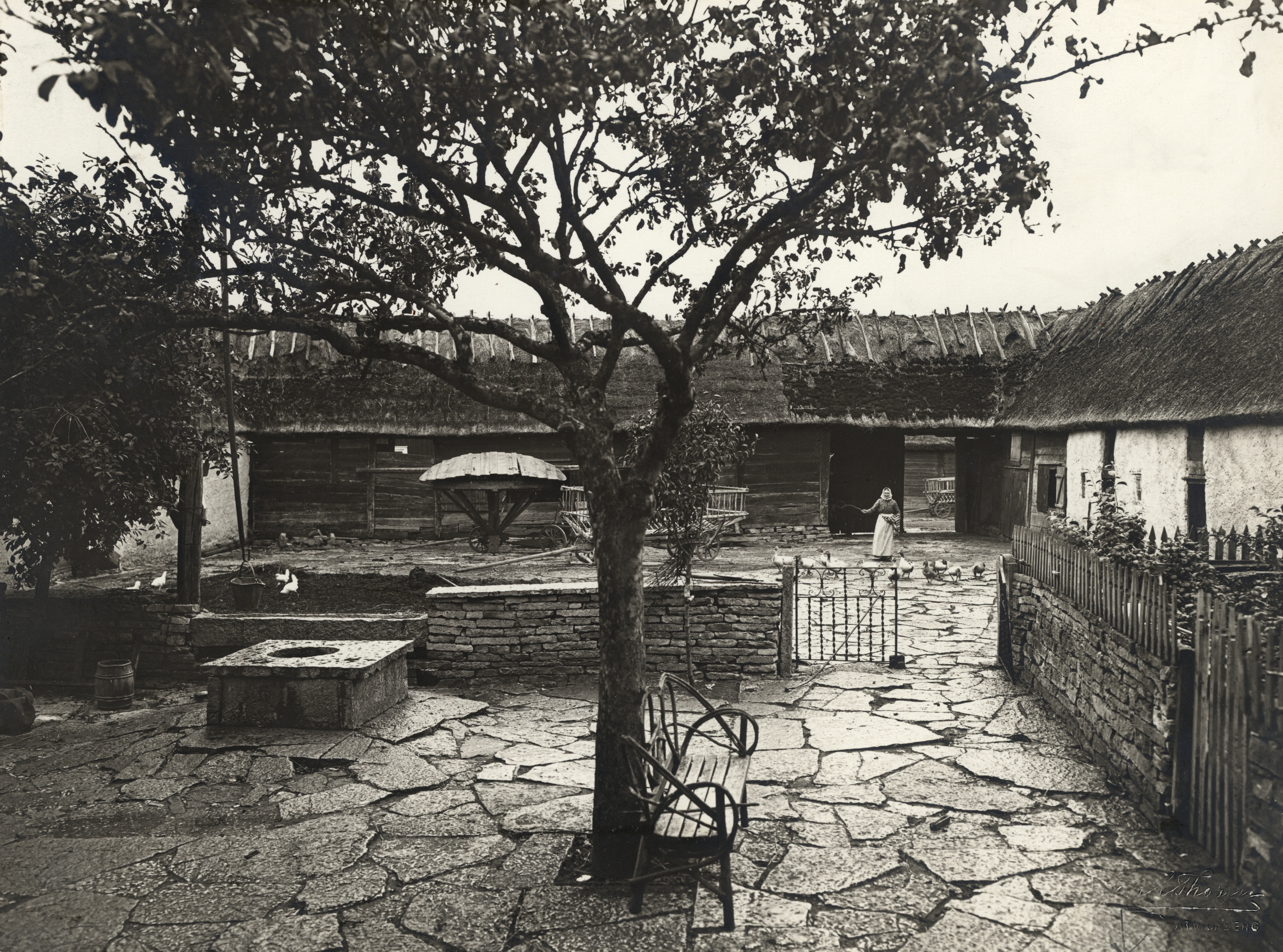
Farm in Triberga, 1906. The farm burned down around the year 1925.

Triberga is a village on the island of Öland in the kingdom of Sweden. For many years Triberga has been investigated for its unusual flora and fauna including littoral species.

== See also ==
- Hulterstad
- Eketorp
