= Bägby =

Village in Öland, Sweden

Coordinates: 56°46′N 16°44′E

Bägby is a village with less than 50 inhabitants (2005) on the Swedish island of Öland. It lies next to the road 136. It belongs to the municipality Borgholm.
