= Kolstad (Öland) =

Village in Borgholm, Sweden

Coordinates: 56.8667°N 16.6833°E

Kolstad is a village with less than 50 inhabitants (2005) on the island Öland. It belongs to the municipality Borgholm.
