= Björkviken =

- Location within Kalmar Location within Sweden
- Coordinates: 56°52′53″N 16°41′25″E
- Country: Sweden
- Province: Öland
- County: Kalmar County
- Municipality: Borgholm Municipality

Area
  - Total: 0.11 km^{2} (0.042 sq mi)

Population (31 December 2010)
  - Total: 208
  - Density: 1,898/km^{2} (4,920/sq mi)
- Time zone: UTC+1 (CET)
  - Summer (DST): UTC+2 (CEST)

Björkviken is a locality situated in Borgholm Municipality, Kalmar County, Sweden with 208 inhabitants in 2010. Supposedly, at 11.01 hectares, it is the smallest town in Sweden.
