= Vedborm, Sweden =

Coordinates: 57°12′N 17°01′E

Vedborm (Swedish pronunciation: [ˈvêːdbɔrm]) is a small village or hamlet (depending on the definition) in the Borgholm Municipality of the island Öland, Sweden. Population (as of 2000): 63.
