= Rälla =

- Location within Kalmar Location within Sweden
- Coordinates: 56°46′25″N 16°34′20″E
- Country: Sweden
- Province: Öland
- County: Kalmar County
- Municipality: Borgholm Municipality

Area
  - Total: 0.80 km^{2} (0.31 sq mi)

Population (31 December 2010)
  - Total: 407
  - Density: 511/km^{2} (1,320/sq mi)
- Time zone: UTC+1 (CET)
  - Summer (DST): UTC+2 (CEST)

Rälla is a locality situated in Borgholm Municipality, Kalmar County, Sweden with 407 inhabitants in 2010.
