= Byxelkrok =

Coordinates: 57°20′00″N 17°00′00″E

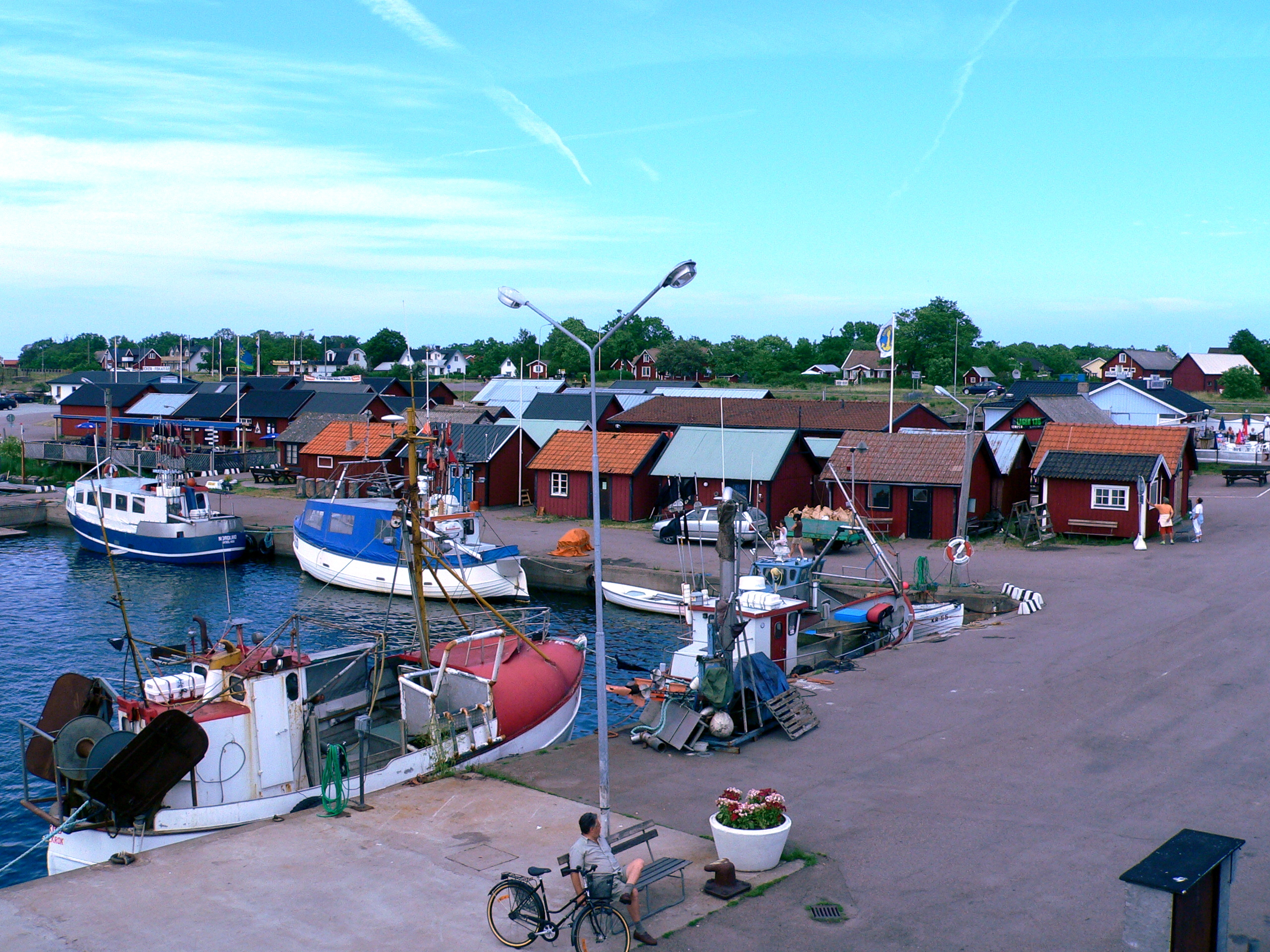
Part of the harbour.

Byxelkrok (Swedish pronunciation: [bʏksɛlˈkruːk]) is a locality situated on the northern end of Öland, Sweden.

A picturesque fishing village in Böda socken, Byxelkrok has a small harbor; tourism is an important source of revenue in summer. The town, on the end of County Road 136 from Ottenby, has a hotel complex, restaurants, and camp sites. In summer, there is a ferry service to Oskarshamn on the mainland, and a boat service to Blå Jungfrun in the Kalmar Strait.

The name derives from Byskogskroken,(The Village Forests bend) in reference to the bend in the coastline toward the south, to cape Tokenäs, two kilometers south of the Byxelkrok harbor, which formerly had a Viking harbor. According to legend, Viking chieftain Toke landed here but was beaten to death by locals.

Byxelkrok is also known for an annual sailing race held in September since the 1960s, a two-day race Västervik–Byxelkrok–Västervik.
