= Köpingsvik =

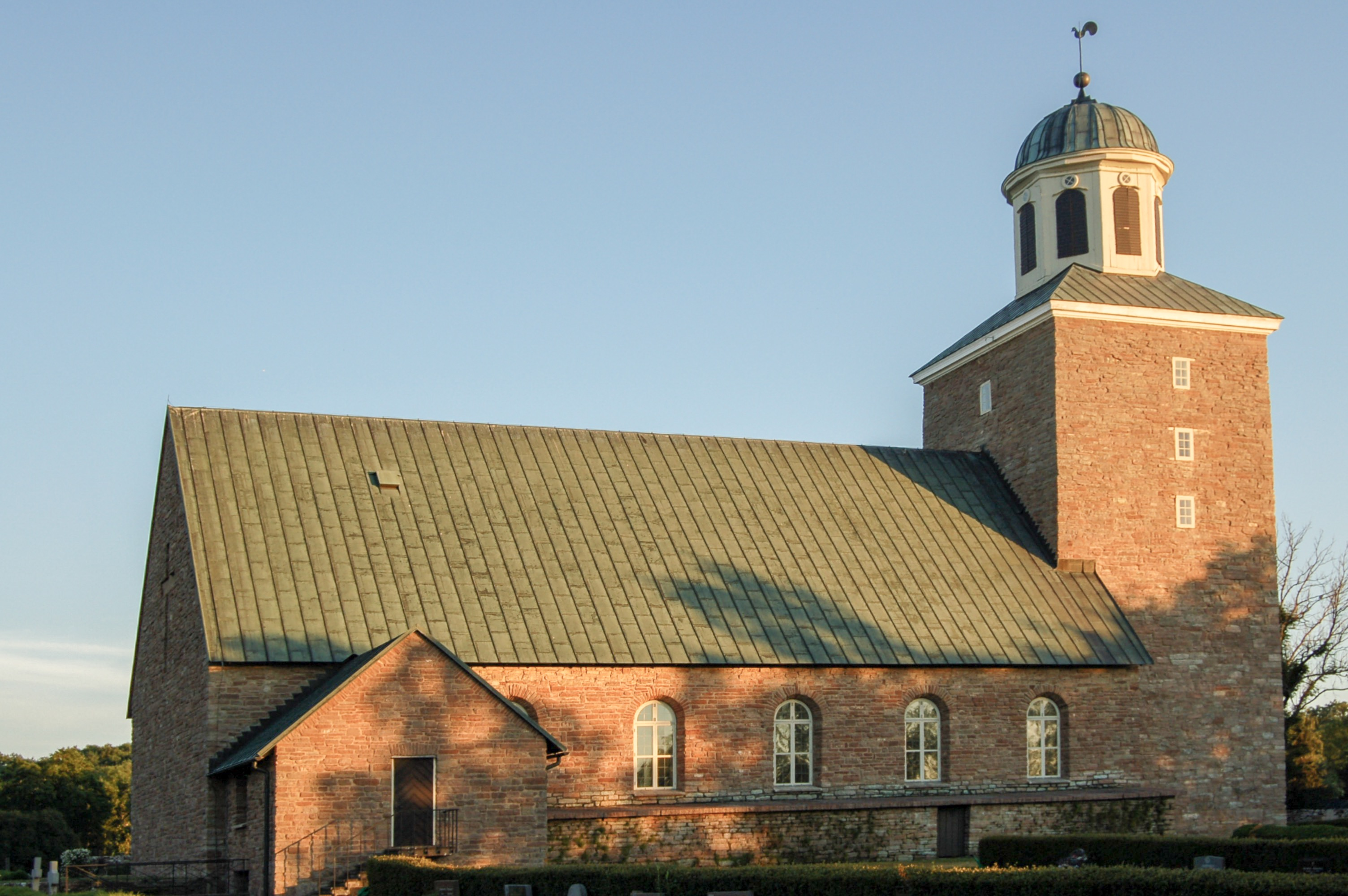
- Köpingsvik Church

- Location within Kalmar Location within Sweden
- Coordinates: 56°53′N 16°43′E
- Country: Sweden
- Province: Öland
- County: Kalmar County
- Municipality: Borgholm Municipality

Area
  - Total: 1.18 km^{2} (0.46 sq mi)

Population (31 December 2010)
  - Total: 599
  - Density: 507/km^{2} (1,310/sq mi)
- Time zone: UTC+1 (CET)
  - Summer (DST): UTC+2 (CEST)

Köpingsvik is a locality situated in Borgholm Municipality, Kalmar County, Sweden with 599 inhabitants in 2010. It is located about 4 kilometres (2 1/2 miles) east of the city of Borgholm on the island Öland.

Köpingsvik is known as a tourist center, offering large and modern camping sites. Nearby are the historic sites of Borgholm Castle and Halltorps Estate.

Köping (historically) was an important Viking Age port of what is today's Sweden, covering an area of approximately 25 hectares (62 acres), almost four times larger than the similar site on the island of Björkö near Stockholm. Köping was in operation from the 7th to the 13th century. It has a significant 10th century grave of a Viking elite woman chiefess known as the Princess of Öland. It was also an important center of early Christianity in Sweden. Remains of an unfinished, massive 12th century church 42 metres (138 feet) long have been excavated as well as the largest collection of the so-called eskilstunakistor, 75 pieces. During the last ten years there have been several small excavations which have confirmed the earlier findings and the importance of the site. Note that these findings are almost unknown to public in Sweden and the ruling view is that the little site on Björkö is Sweden's "oldest town".

Köping faded away around 1200, and Kalmar took over as the most important harbour town in south-eastern Sweden.

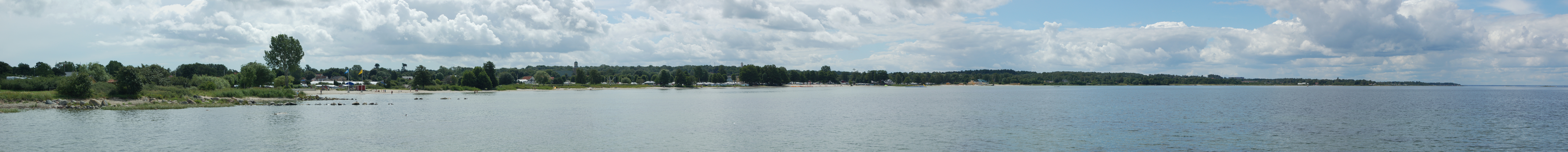
Panorama over Köpingsvik's beach
