= Borgholm Municipality =

Borgholm Municipality Borgholms kommun
- Municipality
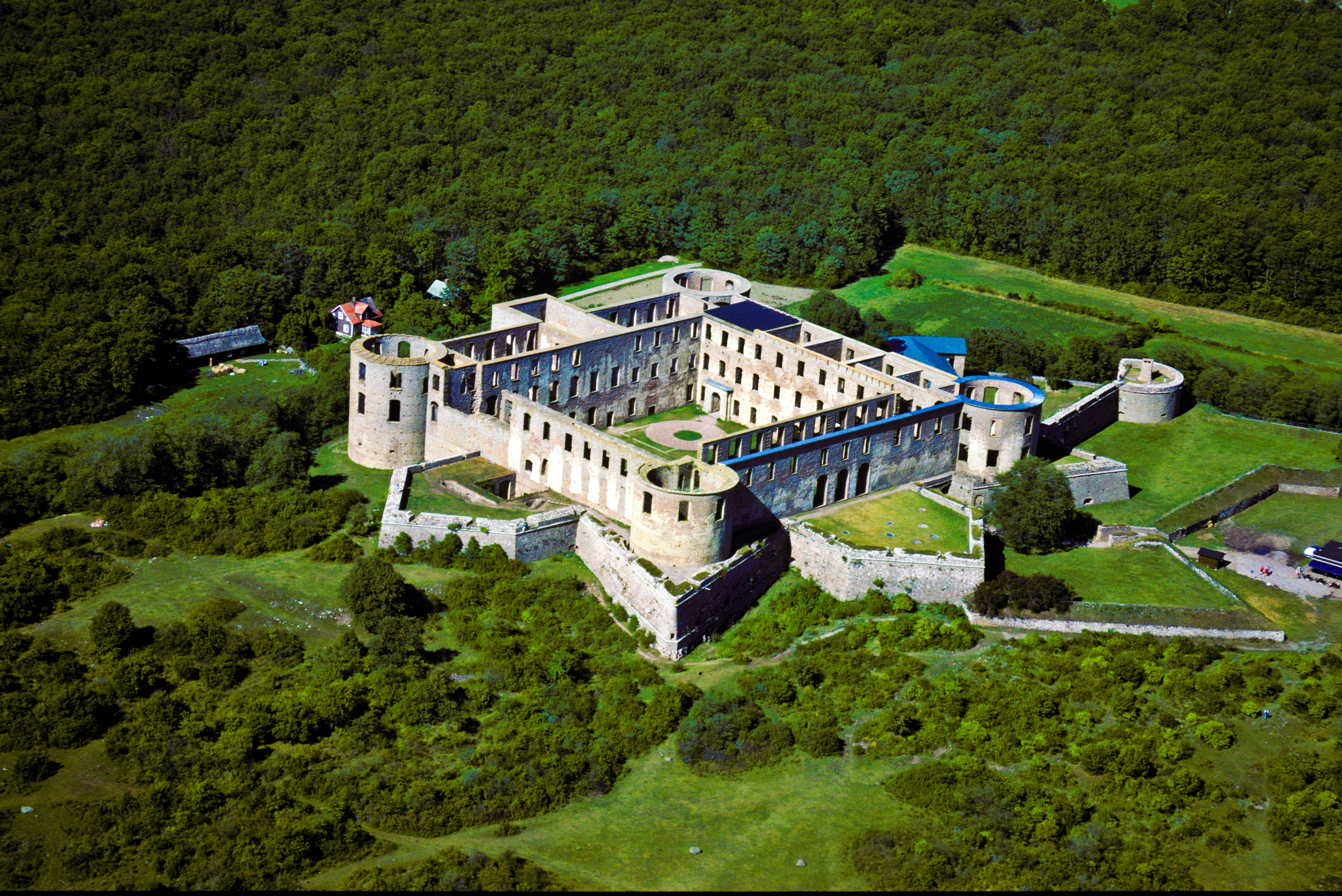
- Borgholm Castle

- Coat of arms

- Coordinates: 56°53′N 16°39′E
- Country: Sweden
- County: Kalmar County
- Seat: Borgholm

Area
  - Total: 3,654.83 km^{2} (1,411.14 sq mi)
  - Land: 678.65 km^{2} (262.03 sq mi)
  - Water: 2,976.18 km^{2} (1,149.11 sq mi)
- Area as of 1 January 2014.

Population (30 June 2025)
  - Total: 10,682
  - Density: 15.740/km^{2} (40.767/sq mi)
- Time zone: UTC+1 (CET)
  - Summer (DST): UTC+2 (CEST)
- ISO 3166 code: SE
- Province: Öland
- Municipal code: 0885
- Website: www.borgholm.se

Borgholm Municipality (Swedish: Borgholms kommun) is a municipality in Kalmar County, south-eastern Sweden, constituting the northern half of the island of Öland in the Baltic Sea. The municipal seat is located in the city of Borgholm.

Notable historic sites in this municipality are Borgholm Castle and Halltorps Estate.

The local government reform in the 1970s saw the creation of two municipalities on the island of Öland. Borgholm Municipality is the northern of the two and consists of sixteen original (pre-1952) entities. The southern half of the island is made up of Mörbylånga Municipality.

It is the birthplace of John Eke, A long distance runner who competed in the 1912 Olympics, He later competed for the Irish American Athletic Club in NYC

== Localities ==
There are 5 urban areas (also called Tätort or localities) in Borgholm Municipality.

In the table the localities are listed according to the size of the population as of December 31, 2005. The municipal seat is in bold characters.

#	Locality	Population
1	**Borgholm**	3,093
2	Köpingsvik	609
3	Löttorp	455
4	Rälla	440
5	Björkviken	243

== Sister cities ==
Borgholm has four sister cities (a.k.a. twin towns):

- Rockford, Illinois, U.S.
- Łeba, Poland
- Zelenogradsk, Kaliningrad, Russia
- Korsnäs, Finland

== Demographics ==
This is a demographic table based on Borgholm Municipality's electoral districts in the 2022 Swedish general election sourced from SVT's election platform, in turn taken from SCB official statistics.

In total there were 10,889 inhabitants, including 8,990 Swedish citizens of voting age. 45.0 % voted for the left coalition and 53.8 % for the right coalition. Indicators are in percentage points except population totals and income.

Location	Residents	Citizen adults	Left vote	Right vote	Employed	Swedish parents	Foreign heritage	Income SEK	Degree
Location			%	%					
Alböke-Föra-Bredsättra	1,133	955	44.5	54.7	84	92	8	22,286	29
Borgholms 1	1,710	1,378	47.1	51.8	74	82	18	21,639	32
Borgholms 2	1,576	1,330	46.5	52.1	77	83	17	21,325	31
Böda	701	630	47.1	51.6	82	91	9	21,335	33
Gärdslösa-Långlöt	1,373	1,057	44.5	54.2	85	92	8	24,480	40
Högby	1,009	864	46.2	51.7	83	91	9	20,728	28
Källa-Persnäs	660	562	48.7	50.2	81	88	12	21,628	31
Köping	1,378	1,119	40.1	59.1	78	85	15	23,459	30
Räpplinge-Högsrum	1,349	1,095	42.5	55.7	80	92	8	24,884	40
Source: SVT

== Politics ==
=== Riksdag ===
These are the results of the elections to the Riksdag held in Borgholm since the first election after the municipal reform that was held in 1973. The results only include parties that have won representation in the Riksdag assembly at least once during this timeframe. The results of the Sweden Democrats were not listed at a municipal level by the SCB between 1988 and 1998 due to the party's small size at the time.

Year	Turnout	Votes	V	S	MP	C	L	KD	M	SD	ND
1973	90.7	7,085	2.2	25.7	0.0	50.1	4.9	3.4	13.7	0.0	0.0
1976	91.8	7,581	2.5	25.8	0.0	50.1	5.2	2.2	14.2	0.0	0.0
1979	90.0	7,614	3.3	25.9	0.0	45.2	5.2	2.5	17.8	0.0	0.0
1982	90.7	7,798	2.6	27.9	1.2	39.2	3.3	3.2	22.5	0.0	0.0
1985	89.0	7,714	2.1	28.3	1.8	35.6	9.9	0.0	22.1	0.0	0.0
1988	86.1	7,408	2.5	29.0	6.1	33.7	7.3	4.9	16.4	0.0	0.0
1991	86.0	7,536	2.3	24.6	3.6	28.4	4.1	9.0	19.9	0.0	7.5
1994	85.7	7,653	3.6	33.3	5.4	24.0	3.7	5.3	22.6	0.0	1.3
1998	79.8	7,025	8.5	25.7	4.0	17.7	2.7	18.2	21.7	0.0	0.0
2002	79.9	7,058	5.7	28.6	3.9	21.2	8.6	14.4	15.9	0.5	0.0
2006	81.4	7,230	3.8	26.8	3.9	21.5	4.5	8.0	26.2	3.5	0.0
2010	84.2	7,340	3.6	23.3	6.2	16.8	5.0	7.3	31.7	5.2	0.0
2014	87.0	7,587	3.7	25.6	4.5	14.7	3.5	5.1	24.6	15.3	0.0
2018	88.6	7,682	5.7	23.7	3.1	14.2	3.4	8.3	18.9	21.4	0.0

Blocs

This lists the relative strength of the socialist and centre-right blocs since 1973, but parties not elected to the Riksdag are inserted as "other", including the Sweden Democrats results from 1988 to 2006, but also the Christian Democrats pre-1991 and the Greens in 1982, 1985 and 1991. The sources are identical to the table above. The coalition or government mandate marked in bold formed the government after the election. New Democracy got elected in 1991 but are still listed as "other" due to the short lifespan of the party. "Elected" is the total number of percentage points from the municipality that went to parties who were elected to the Riksdag.

Year	Turnout	Votes	Left	Right	SD	Other	Elected
1973	90.7	7,085	**27.9**	68.7	0.0	3.4	96.6
1976	91.8	7,581	28.3	**69.5**	0.0	2.2	97.8
1979	90.0	7,614	29.2	**68.2**	0.0	2.6	97.4
1982	90.7	7,798	**30.5**	65.0	0.0	4.5	95.5
1985	89.0	7,714	**30.4**	67.6	0.0	2.0	98.0
1988	86.1	7,408	**37.6**	57.4	0.0	5.0	95.0
1991	86.0	7,536	26.9	**61.4**	0.0	11.7	95.8
1994	85.7	7,653	**42.3**	55.6	0.0	2.1	97.9
1998	79.8	7,025	**38.2**	57.6	0.0	4.2	95.8
2002	79.9	7,058	**38.2**	60.1	0.0	1.7	98.3
2006	81.4	7,230	34.5	**60.2**	0.0	5.3	94.7
2010	84.2	7,340	33.1	**60.8**	5.2	0.9	99.1
2014	87.0	7,587	**33.8**	47.9	15.3	3.0	97.0
2018	88.5	7,682	**32.5**	44.9	21.4	1.2	98.8
