= Carl Malmsten =

Swedish furniture designer, architect and educator

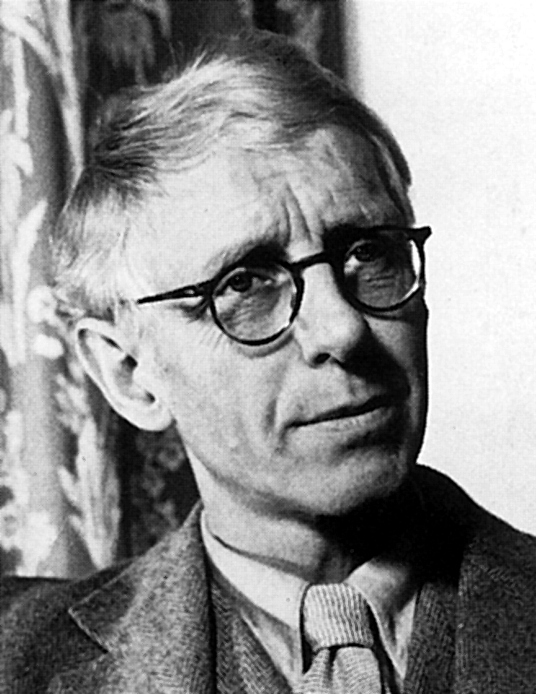
Carl Malmsten

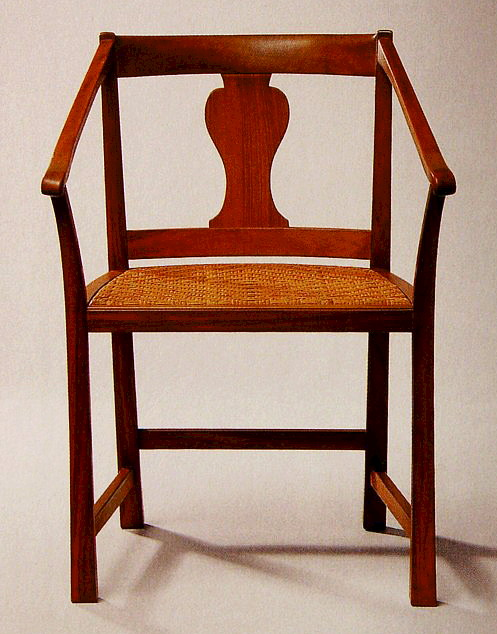
Malmsten designed chair from 1915

Carl Malmsten (December 7, 1888 – August 13, 1972) was a Swedish furniture designer, architect, and educator who was known for his devotion to traditional Swedish craftmanship (slöjd) and his opposition to functionalism. He "considered the rationalization of the home according to functionalist principles a debasement of its traditional role as an intimate place for gathering and repose".

== Biography ==
Malmsten was born in Stockholm, Sweden. He was the son of Karl Malmsten and Inez Cadier. Malmsten's career took off when he won a competition in 1916 to design furniture for the Stockholm City Hall (stadshus); in 1917, he exhibited alongside well-known Swedish architects such as Gunnar Asplund and Uno Åhrén.

Malmsten founded an eponymous furniture store on the riverfront of Stockholm. The store is currently run by his grandson.

In the 1920s he was invited to furnish a room for the crown prince, Gustaf VI Adolf, and his wife Louise in Ulriksdal Palace.

He was honoured with an inaugural Prince Eugen Medal for design in 1945.

== Legacy ==
Malmsten has had a lasting influence on Swedish furniture design through the two schools he founded—the Carl Malmsten Furniture Studies (Carl Malmstensskolan), which has been a part of Linköping University since 2000, is situated on the island of Lidingö on the outskirts of Stockholm. The school had been situated in the city centre until 2009.

Malmsten's second school, Capellagården, is located on the island of Öland in Vickleby. It offers courses in textile craft and design, cabinet making, furniture design, interior carpentry, ceramics, and organic horticulture.

== Personal life ==
In 1917, he was married to Siv Munthe (1894-1972). Together with his wife, he founded the Siv and Carl Malmsten Memorial Foundation (Stiftelsen Siv och Carl Malmstens Minne). The Foundation owns the intellectual property rights from Carl Malmsten.

Malmsten was the paternal grandfather of author Bodil Malmsten (1944–2016).

== See also ==
- Functionalism (architecture)
- Stockholm Exhibition (1930)
