= Geske =

Swedish witch

Geske, also known as Horgeske (died after 1597) was the central figure of a witch trial in Stockholm. Her trial belonged to the first of the witch trials in Sweden in which the Sabbath of Satan in Blockula, the Devils pact and the Devil's mark were mentioned.

Geske was a resident in Stockholm. She was reportedly of Danish origin, and her sobriquet Horgeske stems from the Swedish word "Hora" ('Whore') or "Hor" ('Fornication'), signifying that she was a prostitute. In September 1597, Geske was prosecuted on charges of sorcery alongside another woman by the name Brita Åkesdotter.

Geske was accused to have deprived a number of people of "power and courage" by the use of magic. A widow and her son accused her of having blackmailed them to give her "a golden ring, money and a piece of gold", but still continued to harass them. Her accomplice Brita were accused of having caused illness on the members of a household by having placed magical objects, consistent of magical butter and the foot of a roster in that house. Both of them denied the charges.

During the trial, a woman by the name Karin made a testimony which pointed out both Geske and Brita as guilty. Karin claimed herself to be a witch, who recently had sexual intercourse with Satan, as had many other women in the capital. She explained that Geske and Brita were among those women, that she had recently seen them participate in the black Sabbath of Satan in Blockula, where she had seen Brita have sex with the Devil. Karin claimed that Geske had the mark of Satan in her nose, and that if the court made a physical examination of Brita, they would find the mark of Satan on her as well. Upon the testimony of Karin, the witch trial against Geske grew until it implicated six women. Reportedly, the women had manufactured magical objects of bone and other parts from humans and animals in order to harm their neighbors through magic, "and many other such evils, which was hidden under the floor of her house".

However, the trial never developed into a mass witch trial. The court remained skeptical to the testimony of Karin: "she is not of the best kind; she was also of the kind who rides to Blockula and it is not long since she had carnal knowledge of the Devil. But she was cautioned to confess the truth and not bring forth lies". The court did not take the testimony of Karin seriously and chose to dismiss it. Geske is last mentioned in prison. It is unknown whether she or Brita was prosecuted further, but likely, they were not. The case took place in a period in Swedish history which signified a change in the view of magic. During the Middle Ages, magic was regarded as a relatively harmless superstition in Sweden and prosecuted only if it caused someone's death. Otherwise, the punishment was normally whipping or similar. The late 16th century signified a change, as sorcery were to become associated with Satan and severely prosecuted regardless of use, and the 1590s saw the first series of witch trials in Sweden in which pacts with Satan and visits at Blockula became common. The Swedish witch trials were, however, still managed in accordance with the old, tolerant laws, and the punishments were normally mild. The trial against Geske belonged to these.

It was not until the reform witch law of 1608 that witch trials in Sweden were conducted in the manner of the continent, were all magic practices were associated with the Devil and resulted in executions regardless of how the magic had been used.

== See also ==
- Lasses Birgitta
- Brita Pipare
