= List of shipwrecks in July 1889 =

The list of shipwrecks in July 1889 includes ships sunk, foundered, grounded, or otherwise lost during July 1889.

== 1 July ==
List of shipwrecks: 1 July 1889
Ship	State	Description
Eliza	United Kingdom	The Thames barge was run into by the steamship Herald (United Kingdom) and sank at Wapping, London. Her crew were rescued.
Limosa	United Kingdom	The steamship ran aground on the Blyth Sands, in the Thames Estuary She was on a voyage from Saint Petersburg, Russia to London. She was refloated and taken in to Millwall, London.
Morna	United Kingdom	The ship ran aground in the River Foyle 2 nautical miles (3.7 km) from Londonderry. She was refloated.
Tudor	United Kingdom	The steamship was driven ashore between Dingle Point and Garston, Lancashire. She was on a voyage from Sestri Levante, Italy to Liverpool, Lancashire. She subsequently broke in two and was a total loss.

== 2 July ==
List of shipwrecks: 2 July 1889
Ship	State	Description
Chancellor	United Kingdom	The steamship was wrecked on Watling Island. She was on a voyage from Santiago de Cuba, Cuba to Baltimore, Maryland, United States.
Unnamed	Flag unknown	The wreck of a brig was discovered in the Mediterranean Sea by the steamship Decca (United Kingdom) and was scuttled.

== 3 July ==
List of shipwrecks: 3 July 1889
Ship	State	Description
Isle of Bute	United Kingdom	The barque departed from the River Mersey for Iquique, Peru. No further trace, presumed subsequently foundered with the loss of all eighteen hands.
Mount Baivey	United Kingdom	The schooner ran aground at Teignmouth Point, Devon. She was refloated the next day with the assistance of a tug.

== 4 July ==
List of shipwrecks: 4 July 1889
Ship	State	Description
Matabele	United Kingdom	The steamship ran aground on The Shambles, in the English Channel off the coast of Dorset. She was on a voyage from London to the Natal Colony. She was refloated with the assistance of tugs and taken in to Portland, Dorset in a leaky condition.
William Coulman	United Kingdom	The steamship sank at Philadelphia, Pennsylvania, United States. She was later refloated.

== 5 July ==
List of shipwrecks: 5 July 1889
Ship	State	Description
Aurora	United Kingdom	The ship was abandoned off the coast of New Brunswick, Canada. Her crew were rescued.
Bolan	United Kingdom	The ship was sighted off the Cape of Good Hope, Cape Colony whilst on a voyage from Calcutta, India to Liverpool, Lancashire. No further trace, presumed foundered with the loss of all 32 crew.
Ester	Sweden	The schooner was driven ashore at "Angskar". She was on a voyage from Lübeck, Germany to Degerhamn, Öland.
Guido	Flag unknown	The steamship caught fire at Liverpool. The fire was extinguished.
Kenilworth	Germany	The barque was wrecked entering the North East Channel to the Torres Strait from Bramble Bay, Queensland. Her crew survived. There was some loss of life. She was on a voyage from Newcastle, New South Wales to Java, Netherlands East Indies.
Swan	United Kingdom	The steamship caught fire at Liverpool. The fire was extinguished.

== 6 July ==
List of shipwrecks: 6 July 1889
Ship	State	Description
Teclin Head	United Kingdom	The steamship caught fire at Riga, Russia.

== 7 July ==
List of shipwrecks: 7 July 1889
Ship	State	Description
Collaroy	New South Wales	The ship was driven ashore and wrecked 5 nautical miles (9.3 km) north of Eureka, California, United States. Her ten crew survived. She was on a voyage from Sydney to Eureka.
Victoria	United Kingdom	The ship foundered in the North Sea 7 nautical miles (13 km) west of St. Ann's Head, Pembrokeshire. Her crew survived.

== 10 July ==
List of shipwrecks: 10 July 1889
Ship	State	Description
Alexandra	United Kingdom	The steamship ran aground on the South Patches, India.

== 11 July ==
List of shipwrecks: 11 July 1889
Ship	State	Description
Anadyr	France	The steamship collided with the steamship Oxus (France) and sank at Aden, Aden Governorate. Anadyr was on a voyage from Marseille, Bouches-du-Rhône to a Chinese port.
Turgot	United Kingdom	The steamship caught fire at Bordeaux, Gironde, France. The fire was extinguished.

== 12 July ==
List of shipwrecks: 12 July 1889
Ship	State	Description
Altnacraig	United Kingdom	The steamship struck a rock off Palawan, Spanish East Indies and sank. Her crew survived. She was on a voyage from Yloilo, Spanish East Indies to an American port.
Millfield	United Kingdom	The ship was driven ashore on Perim. She was on a voyage from Penarth, Glamorgan to Hong Kong. She was refloated and resumed her voyage.
Union	United Kingdom	The yacht was driven ashore at Weymouth, Dorset. She was reflaoted on 14 July and resumed her voyage.

== 13 July ==
List of shipwrecks: 13 July 1889
Ship	State	Description
Harley	United Kingdom	The steamship ran aground on the Corton Sands, in the North Sea off the coast of Suffolk. She was refloated and resumed her voyage.

== 15 July ==
List of shipwrecks: 15 July 1889
Ship	State	Description
Foscolina	Flag unknown	The steamship was driven ashore at Barsebäck, Sweden.
Lorenzo D. Baker	United States	The steamship caught fire in the Atlantic Ocean (38°15′N 69°49′W) with the loss of two of the 27 people on board. Survivors were rescued by the schooner Franklin (United States). Lorenzo D. Baker was on a voyage from Port Antonio, Jamaica to Boston, Massachusetts.
Royal Norman	United Kingdom	The steam trawler ran onto the anchor of HMS Clyde (Royal Navy) and sank at Aberdeen.
Susannah	United Kingdom	The schooner was driven ashore near New Romney, Kent.

== 16 July ==
List of shipwrecks: 16 July 1889
Ship	State	Description
Lorenzo D. Baker	United States	The steamship was destroyed by fire in the Atlantic Ocean in the vicinity of (38°15′N 69°49′W). Two of her firemen died. Survivors were rescued by the whaling schooner Franklin (United States).

== 17 July ==
List of shipwrecks: 17 July 1889
Ship	State	Description
Garston	United Kingdom	The full-rigged ship was wrecked on Starbuck Island. Nine of her 29 crew were reported missing. Survivors reached Humphrey Island in a boat on 27 July. They were subsequently rescued by HMS Espiegle (Royal Navy).
Victory	United Kingdom	The tug collided with the paddle steamer Queen Victoria ( (United Kingdom of Great Britain and Ireland) Isle of Man) in the River Mersey and was damaged.

== 18 July ==
List of shipwrecks: 18 July 1889
Ship	State	Description
City of Paris	United Kingdom	The steamship ran aground in the Formby Channel. She was on a voyage from New York, United States to Liverpool, Lancashire.

== 19 July ==
List of shipwrecks: 19 July 1889
Ship	State	Description
Catherine	United Kingdom	The schooner exploded and sank at Thames Haven, Essex with the loss of one of her four crew. She was on a voyage from Thames Haven to Bristol, Gloucestershire.
Fidia D.	Italy	The barque was driven ashore 25 nautical miles (46 km) from Durban, Natal Colony with the loss of two of her crew. She was on a voyage from Moulmein, Burma to a British port.
Mirror	United Kingdom	The steamship lost her propeller in the River Thames and was beached at Rotherhithe, London, being in a sinking condition. She was refloated and taken in to Rotherhithe.
Stranger	United Kingdom	The lugger collided with another vessel and was abandoned by her crew. She was subsequently towed in to Lowestoft, Suffolk by the fishing trawler Chanticleer (United Kingdom).

== 20 July ==
List of shipwrecks: 20 July 1889
Ship	State	Description
Godild	United Kingdom	The dandy was wrecked at the Birling Gap, Sussex.
Royal Prince	United Kingdom	The steamship caught fire at Barry, Glamorgan.

== 21 July ==
List of shipwrecks: 21 July 1889
Ship	State	Description
Carolsides	United Kingdom	The tug sank.
Eduardo	Spain	The steamship was wrecked in dense fog on Old Man Island two miles (3.2 km) south of Cutler, Maine. All 40 crew were rescued.
Klio	Germany	The full-rigged ship collided with the steamship Dotterell (United Kingdom) in the English Channel off the coast of Kent, United Kingdom and was damaged. Klio was on a voyage from Calcutta, India to Dundee, Forfarshire, United Kingdom.

== 23 July ==
List of shipwrecks: 23 July 1889
Ship	State	Description
Agnes	Germany	The brig ran aground in the River Nene at Wisbech, Cambridgeshire, United Kingdom. She was on a voyage from Memel to Wisbech.
Herman Babson	United States	The schooner was wrecked at Baine Harbour, Newfoundland Colony. Her crew were rescued.

== 24 July ==
List of shipwrecks: 24 July 1889
Ship	State	Description
Aries	United Kingdom	The steam yacht was driven ashore at the "Plockton Lighthouse". She was refloated on 26 July and beached at Plockton, Ross-shire.
Svannen	Norway	The barque sprang a leak and was abandoned in the Indian Ocean. Her crew were rescued by the full-rigged ship Libussa (Germany). Svannen was on a voyage from New York, United States to Port Natal, Natal Colony.

== 25 July ==
List of shipwrecks: 25 July 1889
Ship	State	Description
Pamela	United Kingdom	The steam pinnace was wrecked in the River Bann. Her crew survived.

== 28 July ==
List of shipwrecks: 28 July 1889
Ship	State	Description
Bertha	Germany	The schooner was driven ashore at Lemvig, Denmark. Her crew were rescued.
Denia	United Kingdom	The steamship collided with the steamship Craighill (United Kingdom) in the Northern Dvina and was severely damaged. She put back to Archangelsk, Russia.

== 29 July ==
List of shipwrecks: 29 July 1889
Ship	State	Description
Maria Stoneman	United Kingdom	The ship ran aground off Londonderry.
Rosa	United Kingdom	The steam trawler struck a sunken pile and was beached at Montrose, Forfarshire.

== 30 July ==
List of shipwrecks: 30 July 1889
Ship	State	Description
Ocean	United Kingdom	The ship was driven ashore at Rye, Sussex. She was on a voyage from Newcastle upon Tyne, Northumberland to Southampton, Hampshire.

== Unknown date ==
List of shipwrecks: Unknown date in July 1889
Ship	State	Description
Achilles	Norway	The barque ran aground at Kastrup, Denmark. She was on a voyage from Hamina, Grand Duchy of Finland to Amsterdam, North Holland, Netherlands. She was refloated with assistance.
Adara	Flag unknown	The ship was driven ashore near Galaţi, Kingdom of Romania. She was later refloated and taken in to Sulina, Romania, where she arrived on 21 July.
Afghan	United Kingdom	The steamship sank at Newcastle, New South Wales. She was on a voyage from Newcastle to Java, Netherlands East Indies.
Alice	Norway	The brig ran aground on the Shipwash Sand, in the North Sea off the coast of Suffolk, United Kingdom. She was refloated with assistance from the tug Harwich (United Kingdom) and towed in to Harwich, Essex, United Kingdom.
Alliance	United States	The steamship caught fire at sea and was severely damaged.
Ansine	Denmark	The ship was driven ashore at Lemvig. She was on a voyage from Hartlepool, County Durham to Thisted. She was a total loss.
Ardnamult	United Kingdom	The ship ran aground near "Faynes", County Waterford. She was refloated on 24 July and taken in to Limerick.
Bjorke	Sweden	The brig was driven ashore at Kalmar. She was on a voyage from Kalmar to Hartlepool. She was refloated.
Brooklands	United Kingdom	The steamship collided with the brigantine Ismyr (United Kingdom) at South Shields, County Durham and was severely damaged. She was beached.
Carl Rahtkens	United Kingdom	The steamship ran aground near Tunis, Tunisia. She was refloated and resumed her voyage.
Charles Northcote	Norway	The barque ran aground on the Middelgrund, in the Baltic Sea. She was on a voyage from Sundsvall, Sweden to Aberdeen, United Kingdom. She was refloated with assistance.
Darial	United Kingdom	The steamship was driven ashore near Portsmouth, Hampshire. She was on a voyage from London to Philadelphia, Pennsylvania, United States. She was refloated and resumed her voyage, but consequently put in to Cardiff, Glamorgan.
Dago	Flag unknown	The steamship was driven ashore on "Ras Saukirab". She was refloated and resumed her voyage.
David W. Hunt	United Kingdom	The schooner was abandoned in the Atlantic Ocean before 5 July.
Domingo	United Kingdom	The steamship foundered in the Mediterranean Sea. Her crew were rescued by the steamship Napier (United Kingdom). Domingo was on a voyage from Santiago to Philadelphia.
Dorothy Watson	United Kingdom	The schooner was driven ashore at Whitburn, County Durham. Her crew were rescued. She was on a voyage from Cork to Newcastle upon Tyne, Northumberland. She was refloated on 11 July and taken in to Sunderland, County Durham.
Dundonald	United Kingdom	The ship was wrecked at the "Cocos Lighthouse". Her crew were rescued. She was on a voyage from Calcutta, India to Talcahuano, Mexico.
Eduardo	Spain	The steamship was driven ashore and wrecked at "Little Rive, Maine", United States. Her crew were rescued.
Faerder	United Kingdom	The barque was wrecked on Cape Sable Island, Nova Scotia, Canada. Her crew were rescued.
Fleur de Lys	Belgium	The steam yacht was run into by the steam trawler Tertia (Belgium) at Ostend, West Flanders and was severely damaged.
Gerd Heye	United Kingdom	The barque was driven ashore on Moreton Island, Queensland. Her crew were rescued. She was on a voyage from Rockhampton, Queensland to the South Sea Islands.
Gespari	Ottoman Empire	The lighter was driven ashore near Tulcea, Romania.
Hindoo	United Kingdom	The ship was driven ashore at Melbourne, Victoria. She was on a voyage from Hamburg, Germany to Melbourne. She was refloated with assistance.
Ismyr	United Kingdom	The brigantine collided with the steamship Fawcett in the North Sea and was severely damaged.
Jessie Harkness	United States	The barque was severely damaged by fire at Manila, Spanish East Indies.
Kama	United Kingdom	The steamship was driven ashore near Kem, Russia.
Kong Carl XV	Norway	The ship collided with at German vessel and was severely damaged. She was on a voyage from a Baltic port to Dunkerque, Nord, France. She put in to Tønsberg in a waterlogged condition.
Lemuria	United Kingdom	The steamship was driven ashore at Matane, Quebec, Canada. She was on a voyage from Havana, Cuba to Quebec City, Canada. She was later refloated and taken in tow.
Lena	United Kingdom	The ship was driven ashore at Kertch, Russia.
Lisboa	Sweden	The schooner ran aground off "Draco", Denmark. She was on a voyage from Middlesbrough, Yorkshire, United Kingdom to Kalmar.
Louisa	Germany	The brigantine collided with the schooner Leo (Sweden) and was damaged. Louisa was on a voyage from Hamburg to Angostura. She was towed in to Dover, Kent, United Kingdom in a leaky condition.
Mallsgate	United Kingdom	The barque was wrecked on the Middleton Reef. Some of her crew were rescued; the rest were reported missing. She was on a voyage from Newcastle to San Francisco, California, United States.
Mars	Flag unknown	The steamship ran aground on a reef and was abandoned.
Maria Stoneman	United Kingdom	The ship ran aground at Londonderry. She was on a voyage from St John's, Newfoundland Colony to Londonderry.
Mary	United Kingdom	The ship ran aground in the Mediterranean Sea (37°20′N 9°41′E).
Mary A. Greenwood	United States	The barque was driven ashore at Natal, Brazil. She was on a voyage from New York to Brisbane, Queensland.
Neophyte	United Kingdom	The ship was severely damaged by fire off Point Lynas, Anglesey.
Orpheus	Flag unknown	The ship was lost at Tabaco, Spanish East Indies.
Ottilie	Germany	The barque was driven ashore. She was refloated and put back to "Solombal", Russia in a leaky condition.
Port Victor	New South Wales	The steamship was driven ashore at "Cape Direction". She was on a voyage from Newcastle to Java. She was refloated and resumed her voyage.
Rapel	Chile	Eleven lives were lost when the Valparaíso steamer sank, during a severe gale while bound for Montevideo.
Rose Welt	United States	The full-rigged ship sank off Bramble Cay, Queensland. She was on a voyage from Newcastle to Singapore, Straits Settlements.
Shamrock	United Kingdom	The steamship ran aground near Bergen, Norway. She was refloated with assistance.
Southern Cross	United Kingdom	The steam yacht was driven ashore in "Loch Slappin", Isle of Skye, Outer Hebrides.
S. T.	United Kingdom	The barque was wrecked at Port Nolloth, Cape Colony.
Telemaque	France	The brig collided with the steamship Alphons Conseil (France) at Bordeaux. Telemaque was beached, but capsized and sank. She was on a voyage from Martinique to Bordeaux.
Thordisa	United Kingdom	The steamship caught fire at Philadelphia.
Walter Ulric	United Kingdom	The schooner was driven ashore at Helsingør, Denmark. She was on a voyage from Portmadoc, Caernarfonshire to Copenhagen, Denmark. She was refloated with assistance.
Waverley	United Kingdom	The ship was lost east of the Percy Islands, Queensland. Her crew survived. She was on a voyage from Brisbane to Bangkok, Siam.
Wilhelm	Netherlands	The brig was driven ashore on Rottum, Groningen. She was on a voyage from Härnösand, Sweden to Delfzijl, Groningen.
Winstanley	United Kingdom	The steamship collided with the hopper barge No. 1 (United Kingdom) in the River Mersey and was severely damaged. She was on a voyage from Garston, Lancashire to Dublin.
Yoben Vicente	Spain	The ship capsized in a squall. Her seven crew were rescued by the steamship Robert Harrowing (United Kingdom)
