= Brita Pipare =

Swedish witch

Brita, "the wife of Jöran Pipare" (floruit 1595) was an alleged Swedish witch. Her case is a significant one, illustrating a witch trial held when the belief in witchcraft had increased, but the law still did not permit harsh persecution of magic practice.

Brita is described in court protocol as "Brita, fru till Jöran Pipare" ('Brita, wife of Jöran the Flute player'). In September 1593, Brita was charged with sorcery in Stockholm alongside the cunning woman "Margareta from Norrsunda". Margareta was active as a folk magician who practiced medicine, exposed thieves and gave rest to ghosts by magic charms: however, as she denied having used these charms to hurt any one, she was acquitted with a reprimand, as the court did not take her seriously. Brita was accused of having caused illness as well as economical damage to some of the city merchants by use of magic. She admitted to have used signeri (spells) and lövjeri (potions), but she denied having had any dealings with the Devil.

At this point, Sweden still adhered to the old law, were magic was prosecuted only when it was deemed to have caused injury or death, and not necessarily associated with Satan, as it was to become later. In the late 16th-century, however, Sweden was influenced by a new view from the continent, which associated all magic practices with Satan regardless of intent. This was eventually to lead to a reformed witch law in 1608, were all sorcery became punishable by death, and the 1590s signified a decade when witch trials became more common and this conflicted attitude were illustrated, such as in the case of Brita.

Brita had confessed to practice magic, which made her a witch according to the new view on magic. However, she denied having made a Satan's pact, and the existing law did not provide for an interpretation of a person as a witch simply by using magic. Influenced by the witch trials in other countries such as Denmark, the court did discuss the use of torture, but a majority of the court members ruled against it. The court eventually stated "not to do more than the law of Sweden allows, which demands six witnesses or a full confession, before any is put to death". Because she had admitted practicing magic, however, she was still deemed too dangerous for the court to let free, even though they could not judge her. She was therefore simply kept in prison. In September 1595, Brita was released but banished from the city. The act was supported by her spouse Jöran Pipare, who "believed her as much of evil as the others". She is not mentioned anywhere after this.

== See also ==
- Lasses Birgitta
- Geske
