= Stefania Malmsten =

Swedish art director, graphic designer and film producer

Agnes Malmsten
- Born: Agnes Stefania Malmsten; 16 October 1967 (age 57); Sweden
- Occupation: Art director, graphic designer, film producer, child actor

Agnes Stefania Malmsten, born October 16, 1967, in Huddinge, is a Swedish art director, graphic designer, film producer and child actor.

== Career ==
Malmsten was born to Bodil Malmsten (1944–2016) and Peter Csihas (1945–2011) in Huddinge, a municipality in Stockholm County in east central Sweden.

She is one of the founders of the magazines Pop and Bibel, followed by a position as art director of Vogue Hommes International in Paris.

She has also worked on the design of books and catalogs, graphics for films, and brand identities and campaigns. Malmsten received the Berling Prize, for 2006. She was the creative director of fashion and culture magazine Rodeo, between 2012 and 2015. She is a senior lecturer in Visual Communication at Beckmans College of Design and a board member of Malmstenbutiken in Stockholm.

== Malmsten Hellberg ==
In July 2013, Stefania Malmsten and Ulrika Hellberg founded a design studio, Malmsten Hellberg. They used to work in the intersection between fashion and art, where they already have an established network both locally in Sweden and internationally. Their clients include BACK, Färgfabriken, The Hasselblad Foundation, IKEA, Moderna Museet and Story.
