= Arontorp =

- Location within Kalmar Location within Sweden
- Coordinates: 56°39′N 16°32′E
- Country: Sweden
- Province: Öland
- County: Kalmar County
- Municipality: Mörbylånga Municipality

Area
  - Total: 0.37 km^{2} (0.14 sq mi)

Population (31 December 2010)
  - Total: 233
  - Density: 629/km^{2} (1,630/sq mi)
- Time zone: UTC+1 (CET)
  - Summer (DST): UTC+2 (CEST)

Arontorp is a locality situated in Mörbylånga Municipality, Kalmar County, Sweden with 233 inhabitants in 2010.
