= Mörbylånga Municipality =

Mörbylånga Municipality Mörbylånga kommun
- Municipality
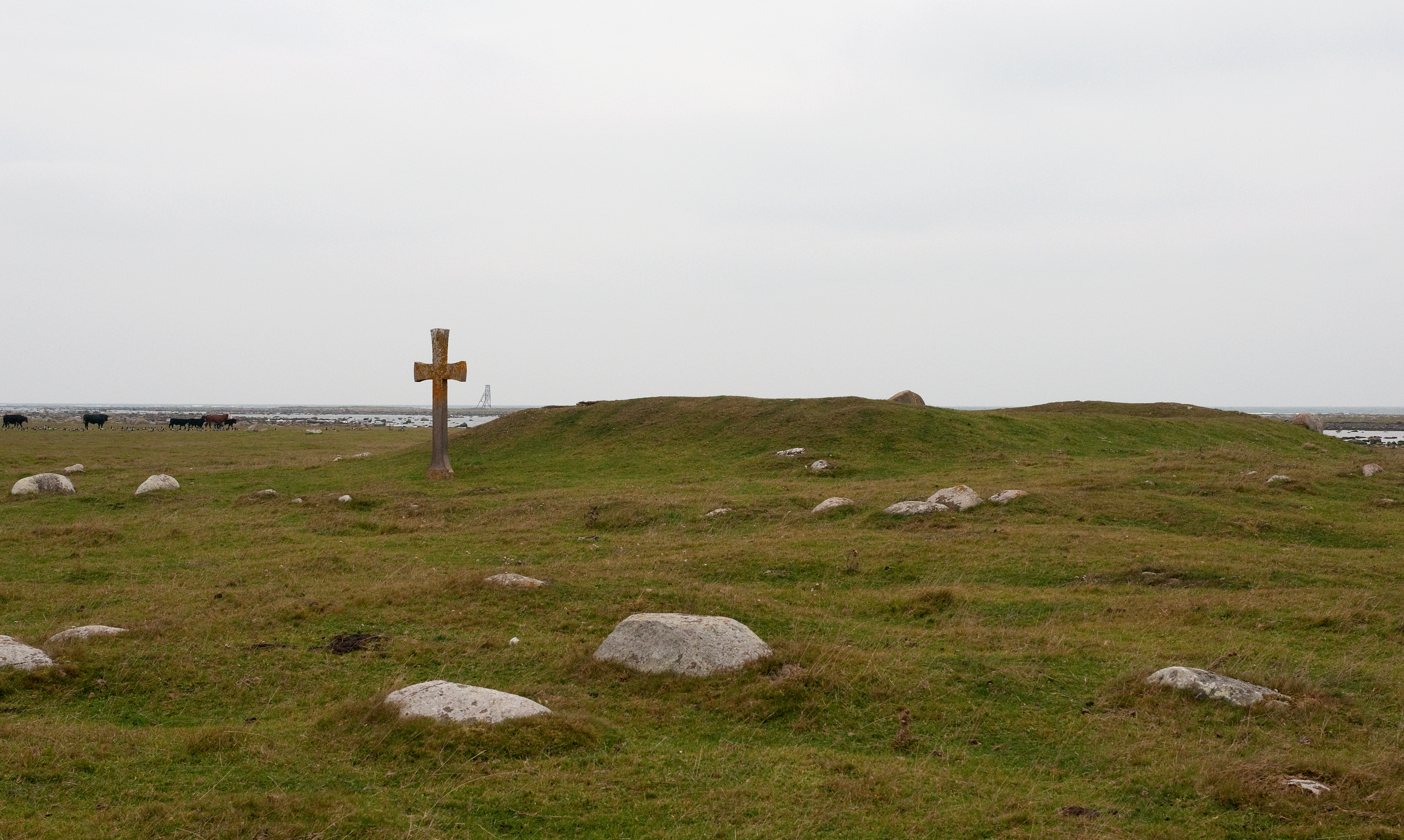

- Coat of arms

- Coordinates: 56°31′N 16°23′E
- Country: Sweden
- County: Kalmar County
- Seat: Mörbylånga

Area
  - Total: 3,043.42 km^{2} (1,175.07 sq mi)
  - Land: 666.79 km^{2} (257.45 sq mi)
  - Water: 2,376.63 km^{2} (917.62 sq mi)
- Area as of 1 January 2014.

Population (30 June 2025)
  - Total: 16,245
  - Density: 24.363/km^{2} (63.100/sq mi)
- Time zone: UTC+1 (CET)
  - Summer (DST): UTC+2 (CEST)
- ISO 3166 code: SE
- Province: Öland
- Municipal code: 0840
- Website: www.morbylanga.se

Mörbylånga Municipality (Swedish: Mörbylånga kommun) is a municipality in Kalmar County, in south-eastern Sweden, located on the island of Öland in the Baltic Sea. The seat is located in the town of Mörbylånga, while the largest town is Färjestaden.

The present municipality, making up the southern part of Öland, was formed in 1974. The eighteen original entities (as of 1863) had during the nationwide subdivision reform of 1952 been regrouped into three larger units. Ottenby was amalgamated with Mörbylånga in 1967 and 1974 Torslunda was added.

Mörbylånga Municipality contains several ancient remains, just like the northern Öland municipality of Borgholm. All in all, there are about 20 hillforts on Öland. The most notable in southern Öland is the fortress Eketorp.

The southern parts of Öland contain certain wildlife areas. Many migratory birds halt here on their way north or south. Especially the southernmost outpost, the lighthouse Långe Jan (Tall John) is visited by many birdwatchers every day, as many birds flock here until setting away over the sea.

== Localities ==
There are 9 urban areas (also called a Tätort or locality) in Mörbylånga Municipality.

In the table the localities are listed according to the size of the population as of December 31, 2005. The municipal seat is in bold characters.

#	Locality	Population
1	Färjestaden	4,636
2	**Mörbylånga**	1,784
3	Skogsby	528
4	Algutsrum	499
5	Degerhamn	372
6	Vickleby	310
7	Gårdby	262
8	Arontorp	231
9	Kastlösa	208

== Demographics ==
This is a demographic table based on Mörbylånga Municipality's electoral districts in the 2022 Swedish general election sourced from SVT's election platform, in turn taken from SCB official statistics.

In total there were 15,717 inhabitants, with 12,229 Swedish citizens of voting age. 46.1 % voted for the left coalition and 53.1 % for the right coalition. Indicators are in percentage points except population totals and income.

Location	Residents	Citizen adults	Left vote	Right vote	Employed	Swedish parents	Foreign heritage	Income SEK	Degree
Location			%	%					
Algutsrum	1,702	1,269	41.6	57.6	90	94	6	28,739	46
Glömminge	673	537	40.6	58.4	87	94	6	27,400	47
Gårdby	1,495	1,176	48.2	51.4	88	95	5	23,869	38
Mörbylånga	2,225	1,781	53.7	45.3	80	82	18	22,923	35
Runsbäck	2,505	1,839	46.8	52.6	88	91	9	27,866	45
Skogsby	1,884	1,449	44.6	54.7	86	91	9	27,331	48
Snäckstrand	1,804	1,422	42.0	57.6	87	92	8	28,633	46
Sydöland	967	849	46.9	52.4	75	86	14	21,700	35
Talludden	1,559	1,178	45.8	53.4	82	85	15	23,450	39
Vickleby-Resmo	903	729	48.0	50.6	81	93	7	27,913	56
Source: SVT

== Elections ==
=== Riksdag ===
These are the results of the elections to the Riksdag since the first election after the municipal reform that was held in 1973. The results only include parties that have won representation in the Riksdag assembly at least once during this timeframe. The results of the Sweden Democrats were not listed at a municipal level by the SCB between 1988 and 1998 due to the party's small size at the time. "Turnout" denotes the number of voters who cast a ballot in the polling station, but "Votes" only counts those casting valid ballots.

Year	Turnout	Votes	V	S	MP	C	L	KD	M	SD	ND
1973	92.0	6,857	1.8	34.3	0.0	39.2	6.8	1.0	16.8	0.0	0.0
1976	92.6	7,915	1.8	35.2	0.0	35.8	7.9	0.6	18.6	0.0	0.0
1979	92.3	8,341	2.7	34.6	0.0	30.1	8.4	0.8	23.3	0.0	0.0
1982	92.2	8,488	2.1	37.1	1.3	27.2	4.9	1.2	26.2	0.0	0.0
1985	90.7	8,463	2.2	36.5	1.3	24.3	11.4	0.0	24.2	0.0	0.0
1988	87.7	8,298	2.7	37.8	4.4	24.6	8.9	2.2	19.0	0.0	0.0
1991	88.9	8,812	2.6	31.7	3.0	19.2	6.4	6.4	21.1	0.0	8.8
1994	87.4	8,848	4.2	40.3	5.1	17.1	5.2	3.4	22.3	0.0	1.5
1998	83.5	8,303	9.4	32.5	4.8	11.5	3.1	15.6	21.5	0.0	0.0
2002	82.9	8,410	6.3	37.7	3.8	13.1	10.4	12.0	15.3	0.6	0.0
2006	85.5	8,757	4.1	34.9	4.2	13.3	6.0	7.2	25.2	3.0	0.0
2010	87.9	9,490	4.3	28.2	6.3	11.0	5.8	6.5	31.2	5.9	0.0
2014	90.3	10,127	3.8	29.4	5.5	9.7	4.1	4.5	24.8	15.2	0.0
2018	91.7	10,367	5.9	27.1	4.0	11.2	3.9	7.3	18.5	20.6	0.0

Blocs

This lists the relative strength of the socialist and centre-right blocs since 1973, but parties not elected to the Riksdag are inserted as "other", including the Sweden Democrats results from 1988 to 2006, but also the Christian Democrats pre-1991 and the Greens in 1982, 1985 and 1991. The sources are identical to the table above. The coalition or government mandate marked in bold formed the government after the election. New Democracy got elected in 1991 but are still listed as "other" due to the short lifespan of the party. "Elected" is the total number of percentage points from the municipality that went to parties who were elected to the Riksdag.

Year	Turnout	Votes	Left	Right	SD	Other	Elected
1973	92.0	6,857	**36.1**	62.8	0.0	1.1	98.9
1976	92.6	7,915	37.0	**62.3**	0.0	0.7	99.3
1979	92.3	8,341	37.3	**61.8**	0.0	0.9	99.1
1982	92.2	8,488	**39.2**	58.3	0.0	2.5	97.5
1985	90.7	8,463	**38.7**	59.9	0.0	1.4	98.6
1988	87.7	8,298	**44.9**	52.5	0.0	2.6	97.4
1991	88.9	8,812	34.3	**53.1**	0.0	12.6	96.2
1994	87.4	8,848	**49.6**	48.0	0.0	2.4	97.6
1998	83.5	8,303	**46.7**	51.7	0.0	1.6	98.4
2002	82.9	8,410	**47.8**	50.8	0.0	1.4	98.4
2006	85.5	8,757	43.2	**51.7**	0.0	5.1	94.9
2010	87.9	9,490	38.8	**54.5**	5.9	0.8	99.2
2014	90.3	10,127	**38.7**	43.1	15.2	3.0	97.0
2018	91.7	10,367	**37.1**	41.0	20.6	1.4	98.6

== Mörbylånga and surroundings ==
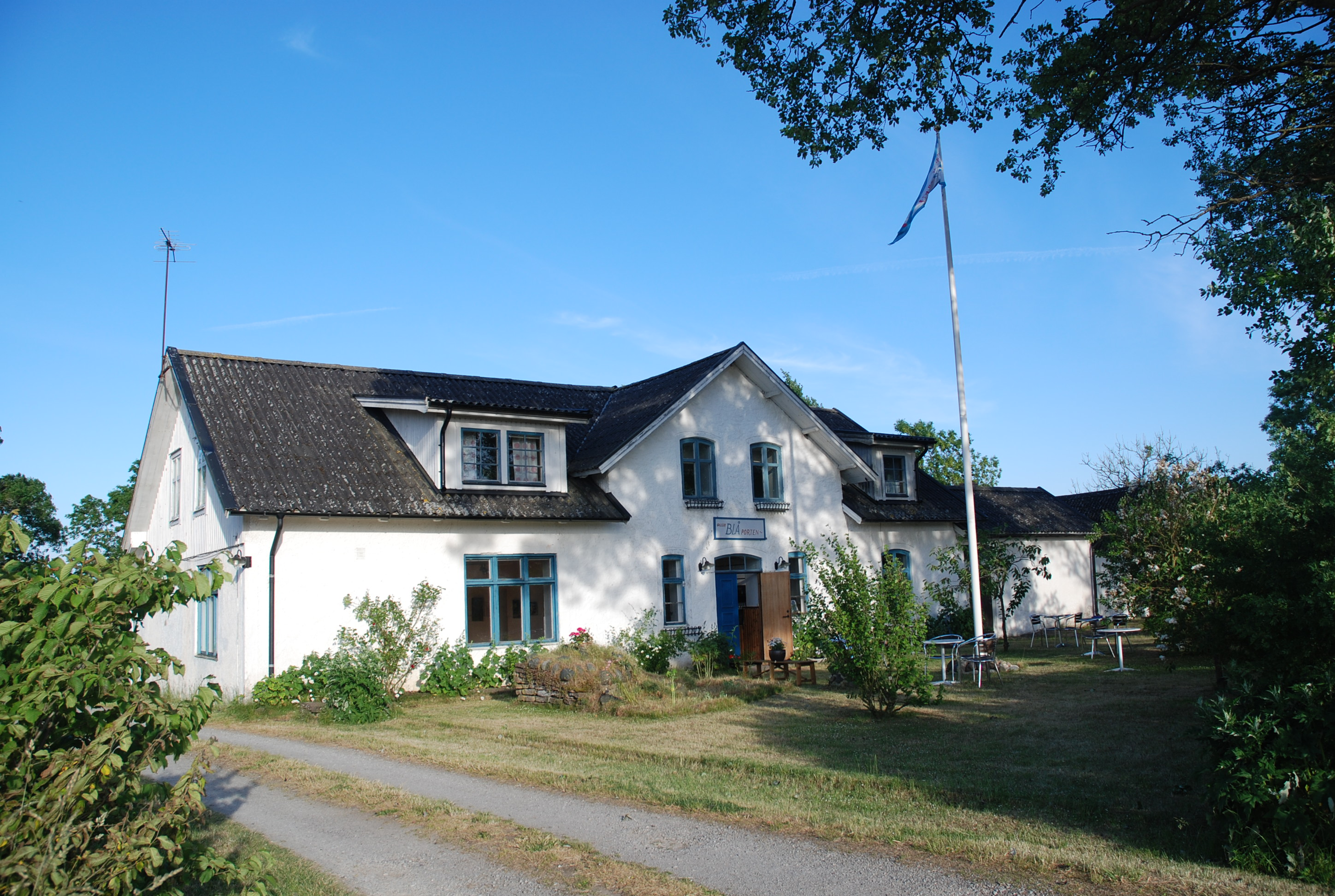

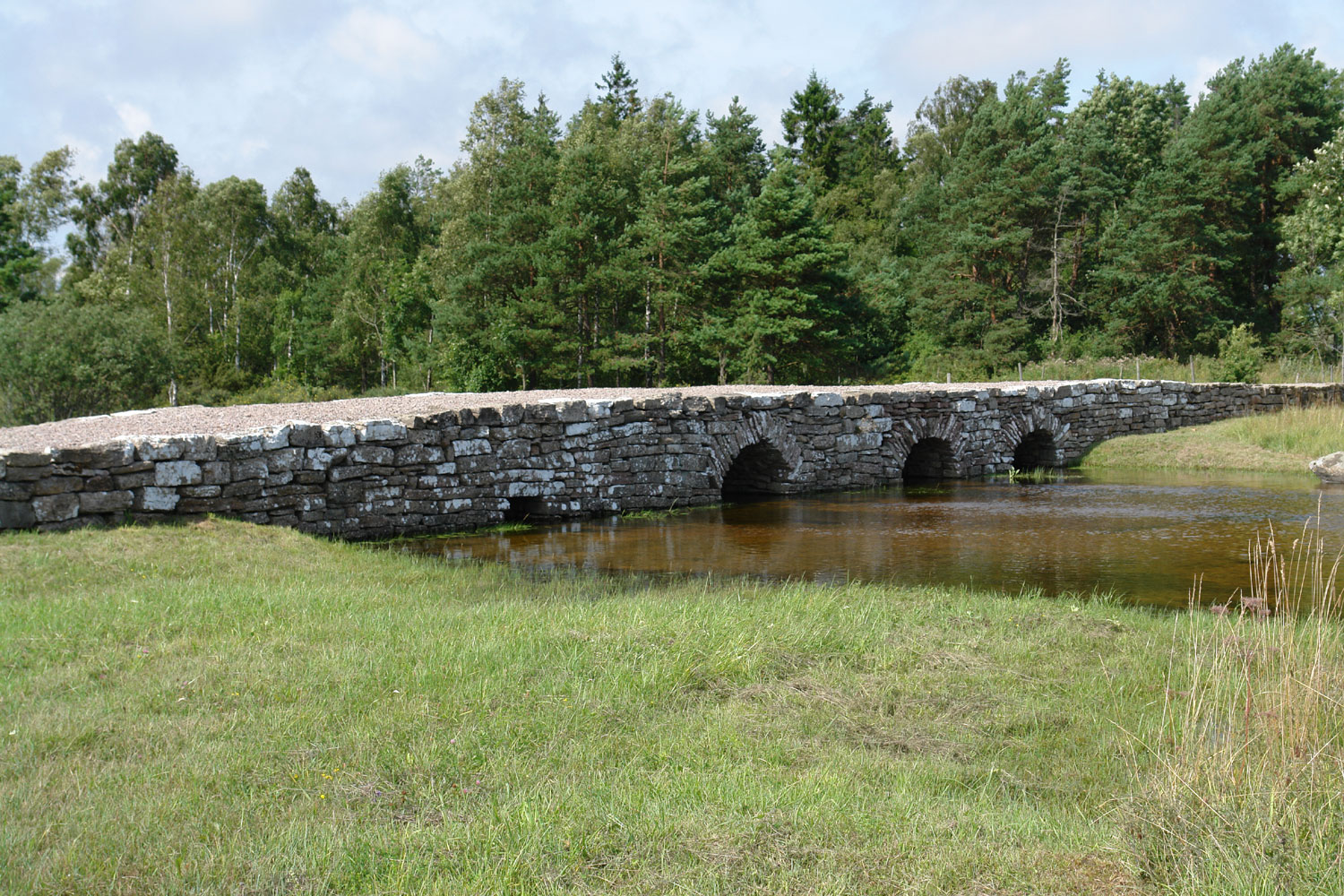

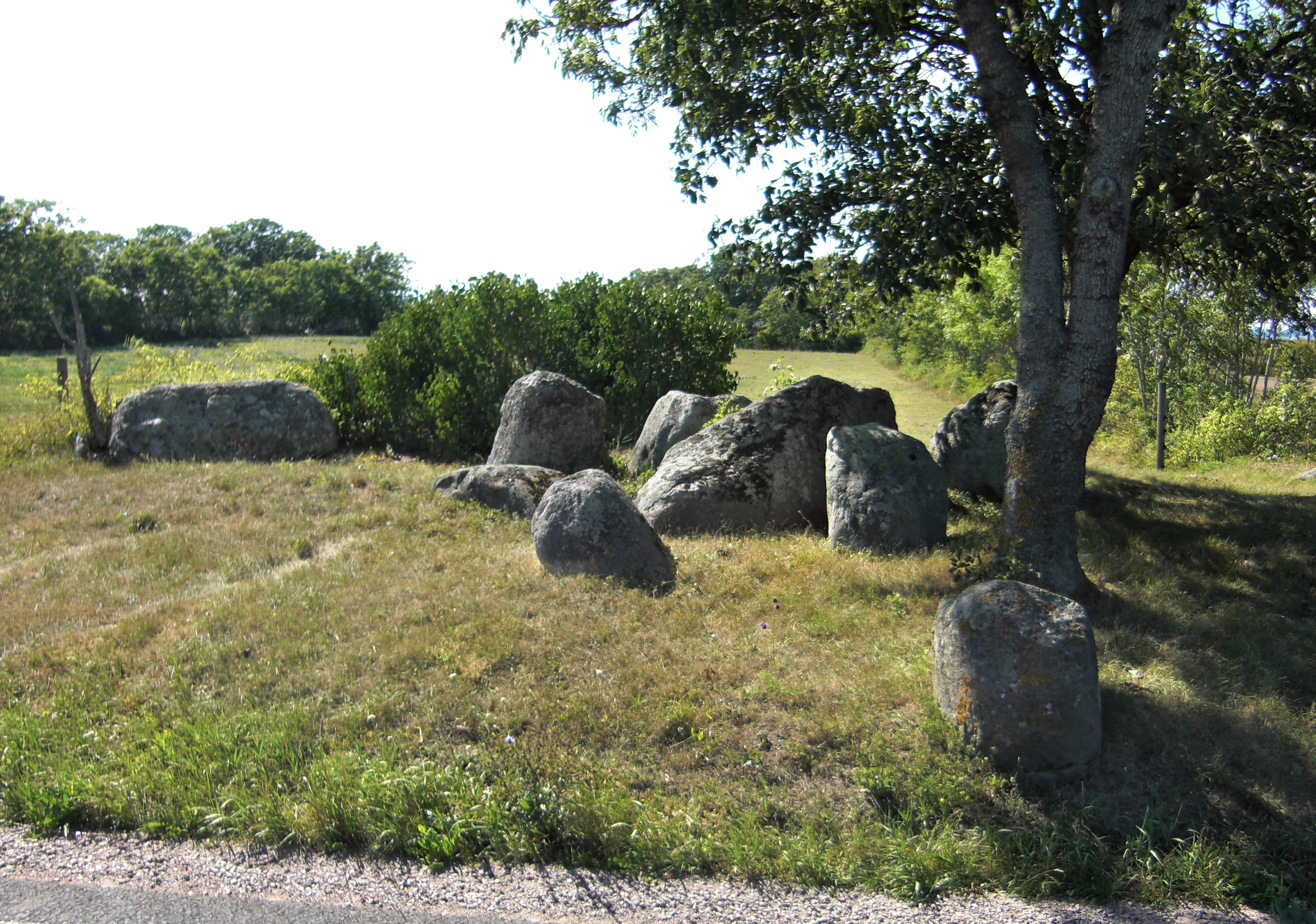

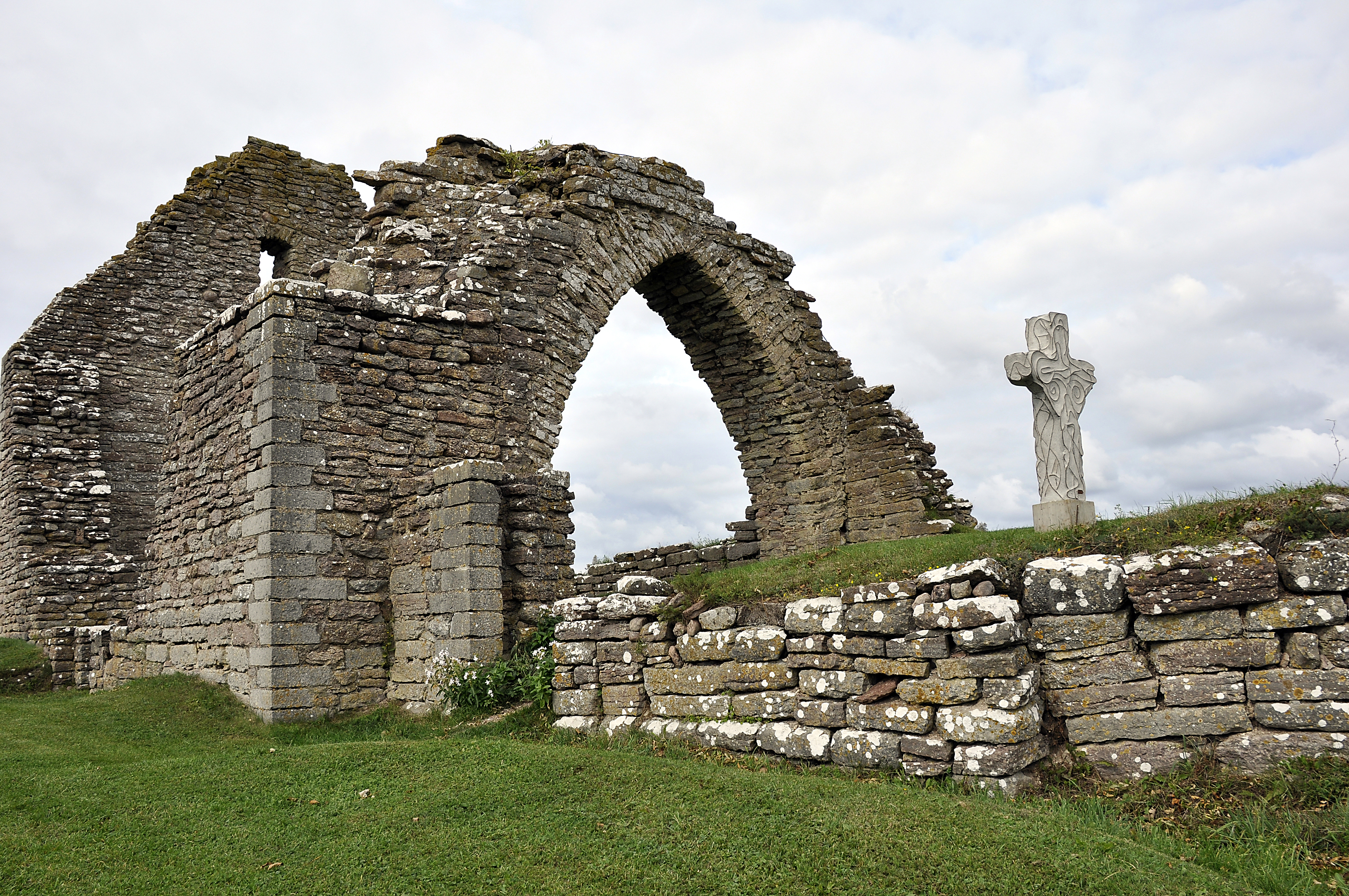

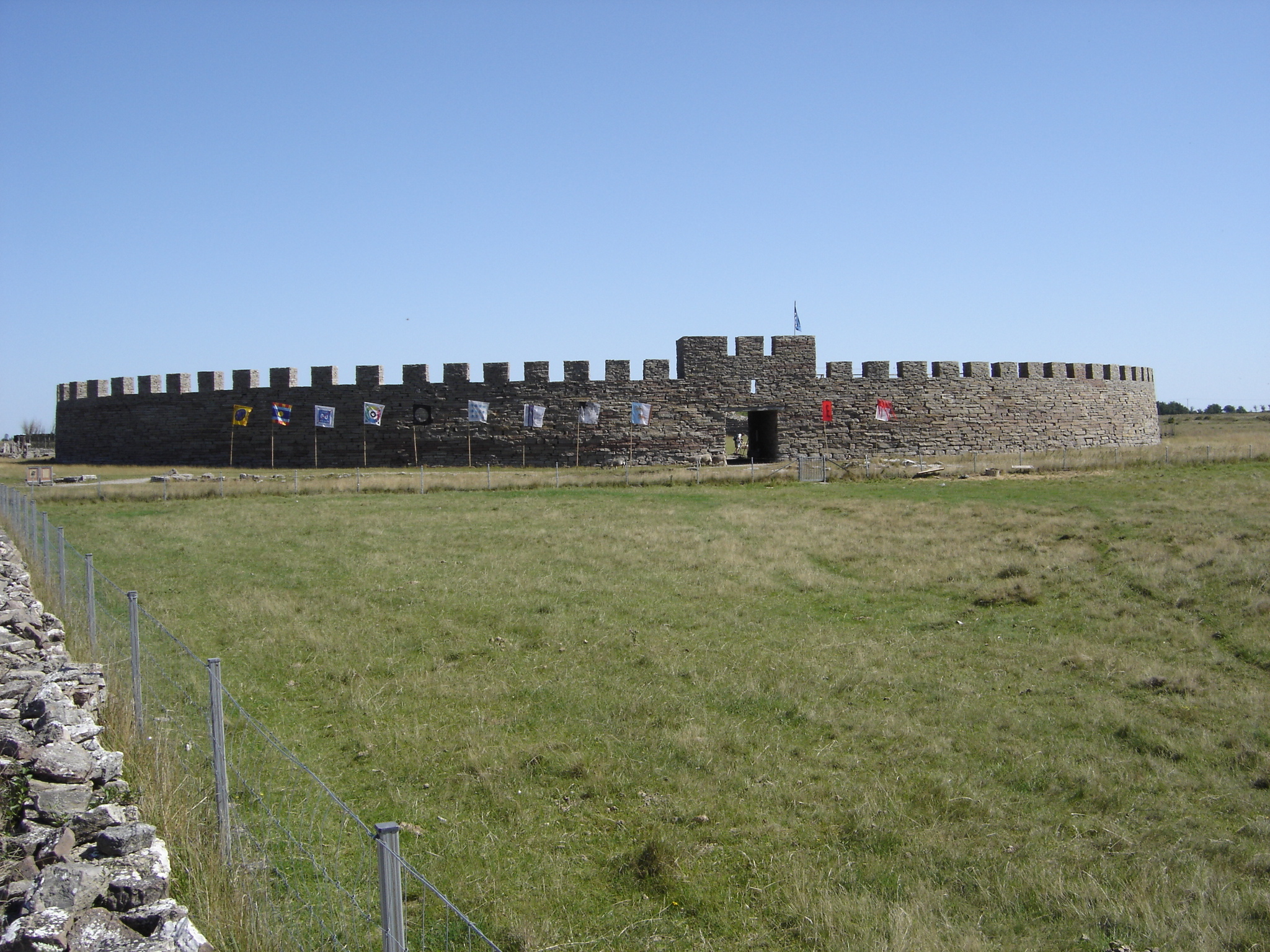
