= Mörbylånga =

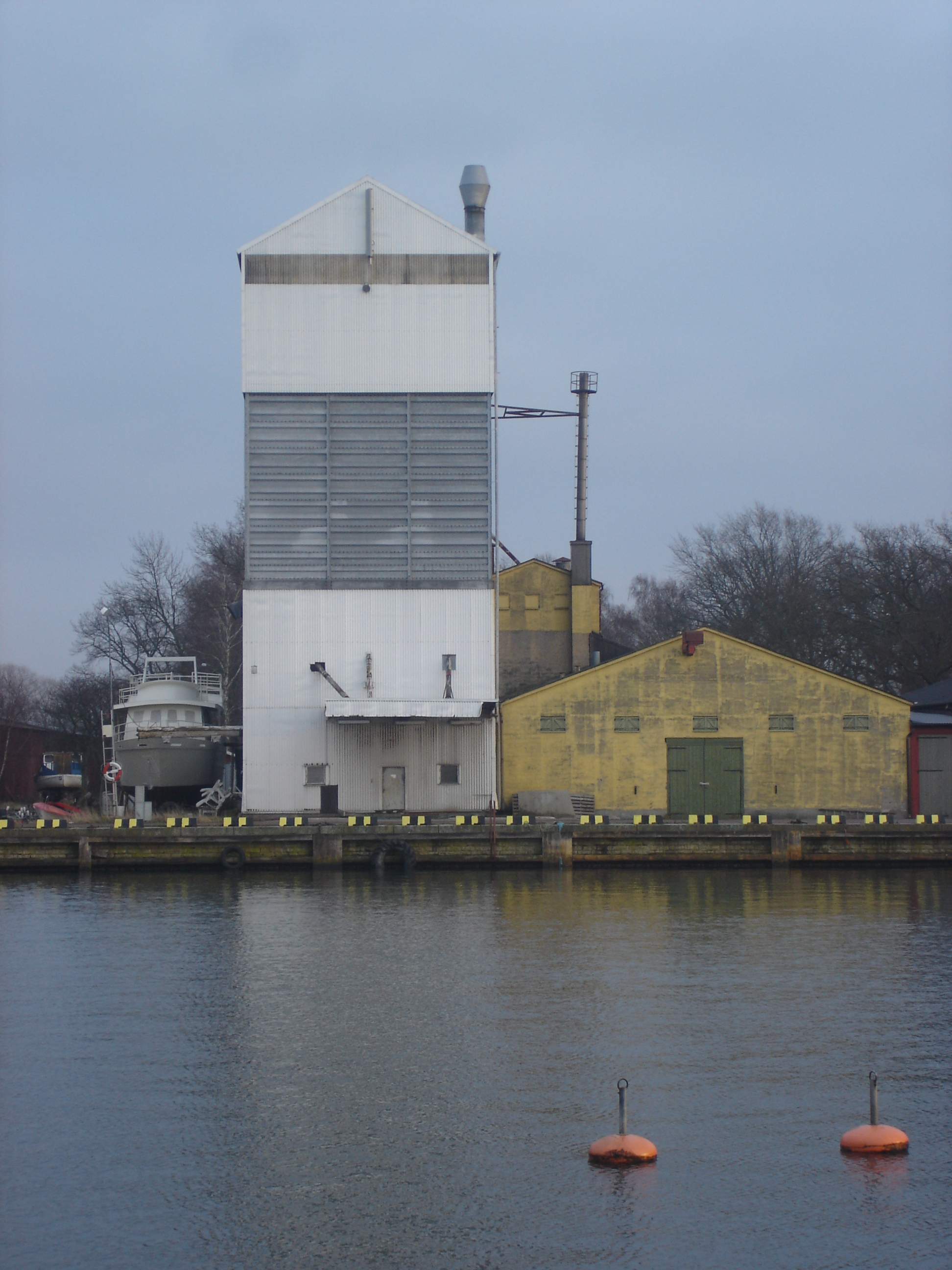
- Harbour of Mörbylånga

- Location within Kalmar Location within Sweden
- Coordinates: 56°31′N 16°23′E
- Country: Sweden
- Province: Öland
- County: Kalmar County
- Municipality: Mörbylånga Municipality

Area
  - Total: 2.44 km^{2} (0.94 sq mi)

Population (31 December 2010)
  - Total: 1,780
  - Density: 729/km^{2} (1,890/sq mi)
- Time zone: UTC+1 (CET)
  - Summer (DST): UTC+2 (CEST)

Mörbylånga is a locality situated on the southern part of the island of Öland and is the seat of Mörbylånga Municipality, Kalmar County, Sweden with 1,780 inhabitants in 2010.

Other settlements in southern Öland are Alby, the site of a Mesolithic settlement, and Hulterstad. The town also has some industrial activity.
