= Lasses Birgitta =

Swedish woman accused of witchcraft (died 1550)

Lasses Birgitta (died 1550) was an alleged Swedish witch. She was the first woman executed for sorcery in Sweden.

In April 1550, Lasses Birgitta, which means "Birgitta, Wife of Lasse", from Algutsrum in Öland, confessed to the bailiff and the secretary on Kalmar Castle that she had tried to awaken a dead man in Kastlösa cemetery at midnight.

One night, Birgitta and two men had entered the church yard with the intent of awakening one of the dead by magic. Birgitta had passed the place in a circle three times and then blew through the keyhole of the church until it opened. She had tried to get a hold of the stole, but did not find it and had to leave, after which she locked the door the same way she entered it. After another attempt on a different occasion, she had succeeded in getting the stole, passed the church three times against the sun, renounced God and swore herself to the Devil. The court judged Birgitta as guilty of sorcery and sentenced her to death by decapitation. The men who accompanied her were given a fine.

After the trial of Birgitta, the Swedish witch hunt remained more or less inactive until the 1590s, and the real witch hysteria was not to break loose until 1668. The last person to be executed for sorcery in Sweden was Anna Eriksdotter.

== Trivia ==
In 2021, the Band Volbeat recorded a song about Lasses Birgitta, released on the Album Servant of the Mind
