= Bodil Malmsten =

Swedish poet and novelist

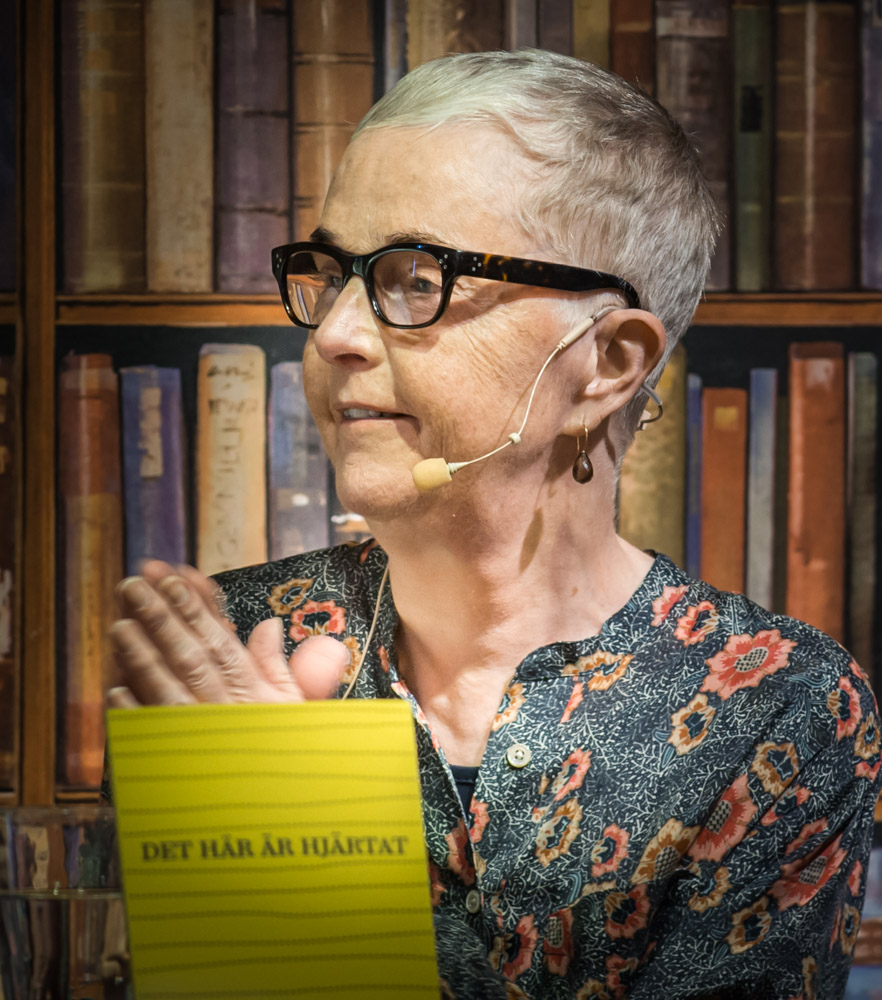
- Malmsten in 2015
- Born: Bodil Malmsten; 19 August 1944; Bjärme, Jämtland, Sweden
- Died: 5 February 2016 (aged 71); Stockholm, Sweden
- Occupations: novelist, poet
- Writing career
- Period: 1970–2016
- Genre: Literary

Bodil Malmsten (19 August 1944 – 5 February 2016) was a Swedish poet and novelist.

Malmsten was born in Bjärme, Östersund Municipality. Due to her parents' early separation, she grew up at her maternal grandparents and at foster care in Vällingby, Stockholm. Her paternal grandfather was designer and architect Carl Malmsten. She debuted as author in 1970 together with Peter Csihas (1945–2011) with their children's book Ludvig åker. Csihas and Malmsten had a relationship during the 1960s and 70s and have a daughter, Stefania, born 1967, who is a designer and actor.

The English translation of her novel, Priset på vatten i Finistère (The Price of Water in Finistère, translated by Frank Perry), was selected as a Book of the Week on BBC Radio 4. In the novel, having decided to pack up and leave her country of birth, she recounts the story her settling into her new home in the Finistère département, in Brittany. It is told in a series of vignettes about gardening, learning the language, dealing with French bureaucracy, and struggling with writer's block.

She was awarded a doctorate honoris causa ad gradum (honorary degree) by the Faculty of Human Sciences at the Mid-Sweden University in Östersund in 2006.

Malmsten died of cancer at her home in Stockholm on 5 February 2016, aged 71.

== Published works ==
- Dvärgen Gustaf (1977) ISBN 91-0-041910-9
- Damen, det brinner! (1984) ISBN 91-0-046074-5
- Paddan & branden (1987) ISBN 91-0-047171-2
- B-ställningar (1987) ISBN 91-0-047423-1
- Svartvita bilder (1988) ISBN 91-7448-975-5
- Nåd & onåd Idioternas bok (1989) ISBN 91-0-047741-9
- Nefertiti i Berlin (1990) ISBN 91-0-047980-2
- Landet utan lov (1991) ISBN 91-0-055283-6
- Det är ingen ordning på mina papper (1991) ISBN 90-364-8761-7
- Inte med den eld jag har nu : dikt för annan dam (1993) ISBN 91-0-055573-8
- Den dagen kastanjerna slår ut är jag långt härifrån (1994) ISBN 91-0-055900-8
- Nästa som rör mig (1996) ISBN 91-0-056230-0 — The next one who touches me
- Undergångarens sånger (1998) ISBN 91-0-056660-8
- Priset på vatten i Finistère (2001) ISBN 91-0-057718-9 (published in English as The Price of Water in Finistère ISBN 1-84343-164-5)
- Det är fortfarande ingen ordning på mina papper (2003) ISBN 91-0-010147-8
- Kom och hälsa på mig om tusen år (2007) ISBN 978-91-86067-40-3
- Det här är hjärtat (2015) ISBN 9789174333336
- Loggböckerna 2005–2013 (2016) ISBN 9789177011552
