= Skogsby =

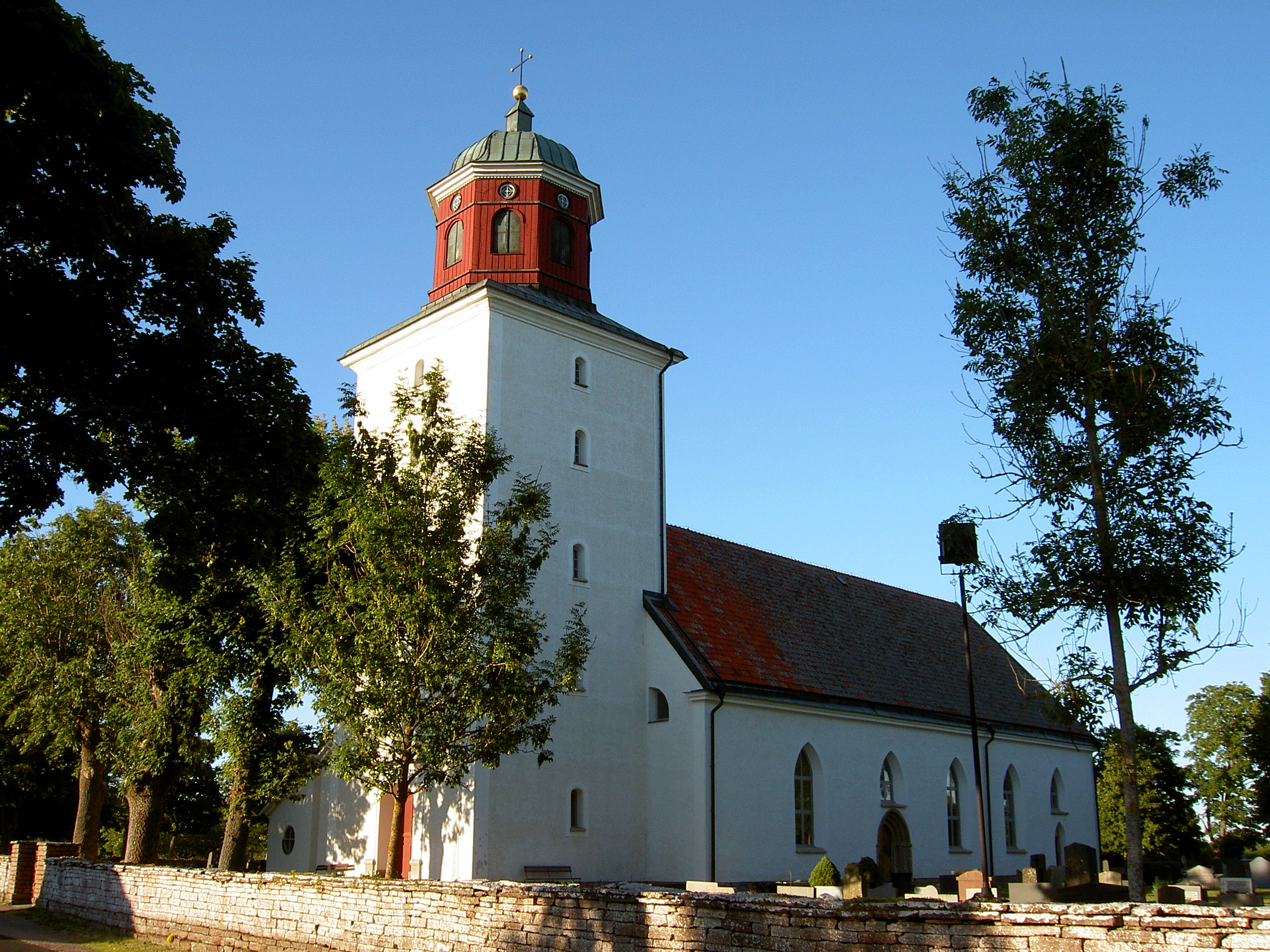

- Location within Kalmar Location within Sweden
- Coordinates: 56°38′N 16°30′E
- Country: Sweden
- Province: Öland
- County: Kalmar County
- Municipality: Mörbylånga Municipality

Area
  - Total: 0.79 km^{2} (0.31 sq mi)

Population (31 December 2010)
  - Total: 569
  - Density: 725/km^{2} (1,880/sq mi)
- Time zone: UTC+1 (CET)
  - Summer (DST): UTC+2 (CEST)

Skogsby is a locality situated in Mörbylånga Municipality, Kalmar County, Sweden with 569 inhabitants in 2010.
