= Kastlösa =

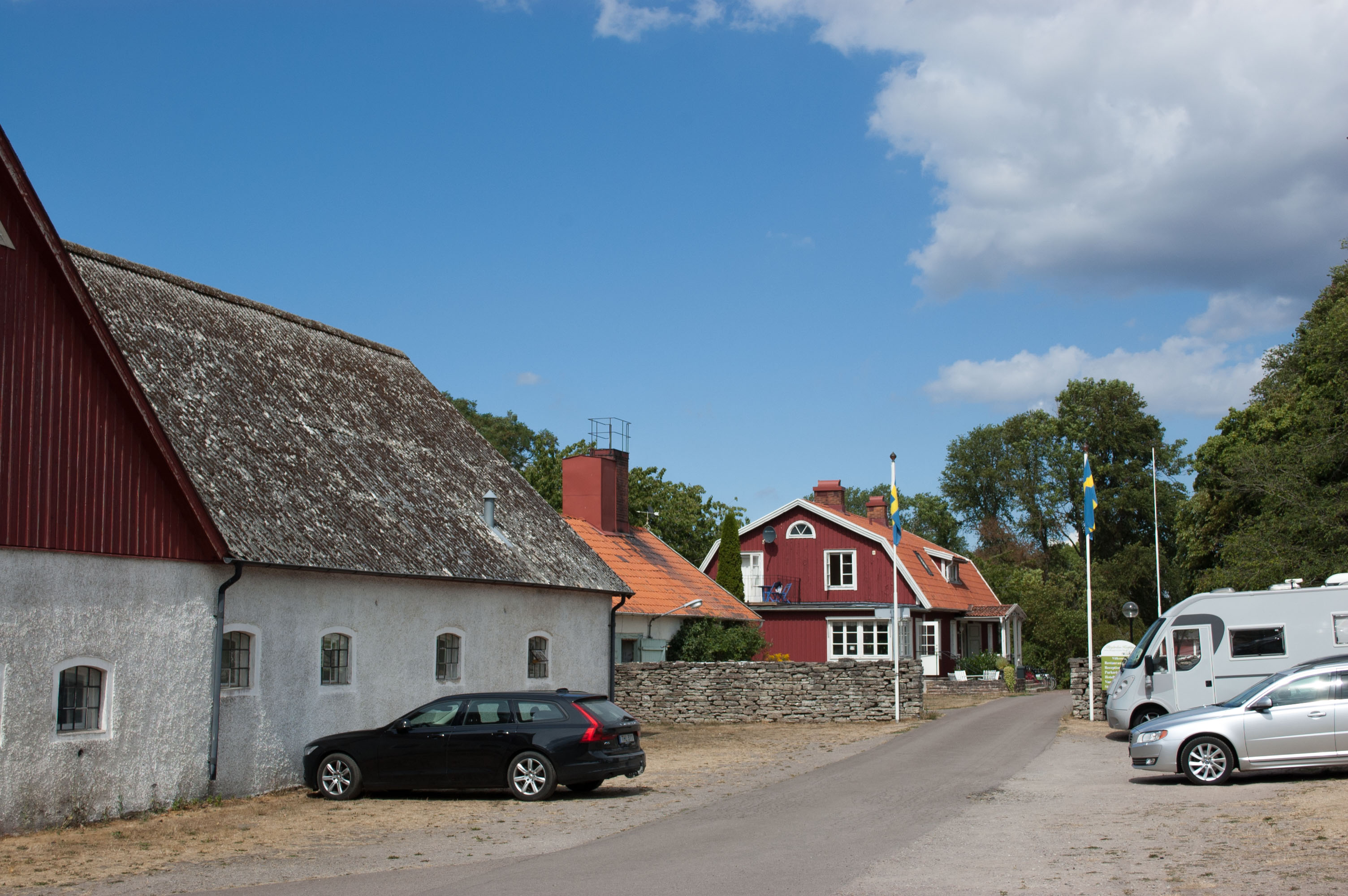

- Location within Kalmar Location within Sweden
- Coordinates: 56°28′N 16°26′E
- Country: Sweden
- Province: Öland
- County: Kalmar County
- Municipality: Mörbylånga Municipality

Area
  - Total: 0.91 km^{2} (0.35 sq mi)

Population (31 December 2010)
  - Total: 201
  - Density: 222/km^{2} (570/sq mi)
- Time zone: UTC+1 (CET)
  - Summer (DST): UTC+2 (CEST)

Kastlösa is a locality situated in Mörbylånga Municipality, Kalmar County, Sweden with 201 inhabitants in 2010.
