= Degerhamn =

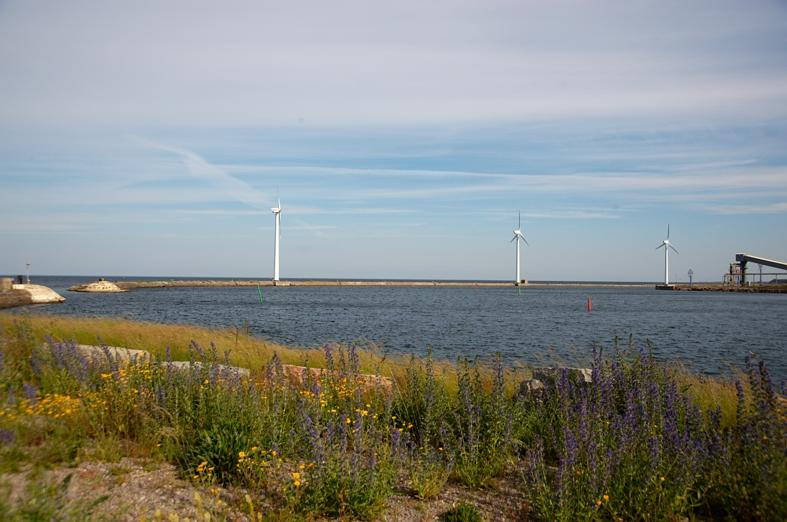

- Location within Kalmar Location within Sweden
- Coordinates: 56°21′N 16°24′E
- Country: Sweden
- Province: Öland
- County: Kalmar County
- Municipality: Mörbylånga Municipality

Area
  - Total: 1.03 km^{2} (0.40 sq mi)

Population (31 December 2010)
  - Total: 331
  - Density: 321/km^{2} (830/sq mi)
- Time zone: UTC+1 (CET)
  - Summer (DST): UTC+2 (CEST)

Degerhamn (Swedish pronunciation: [dɛɡɛrˈhamn]) is a locality situated in Mörbylånga Municipality, Kalmar County, Sweden with 331 inhabitants in 2010.
