= Algutsrum =

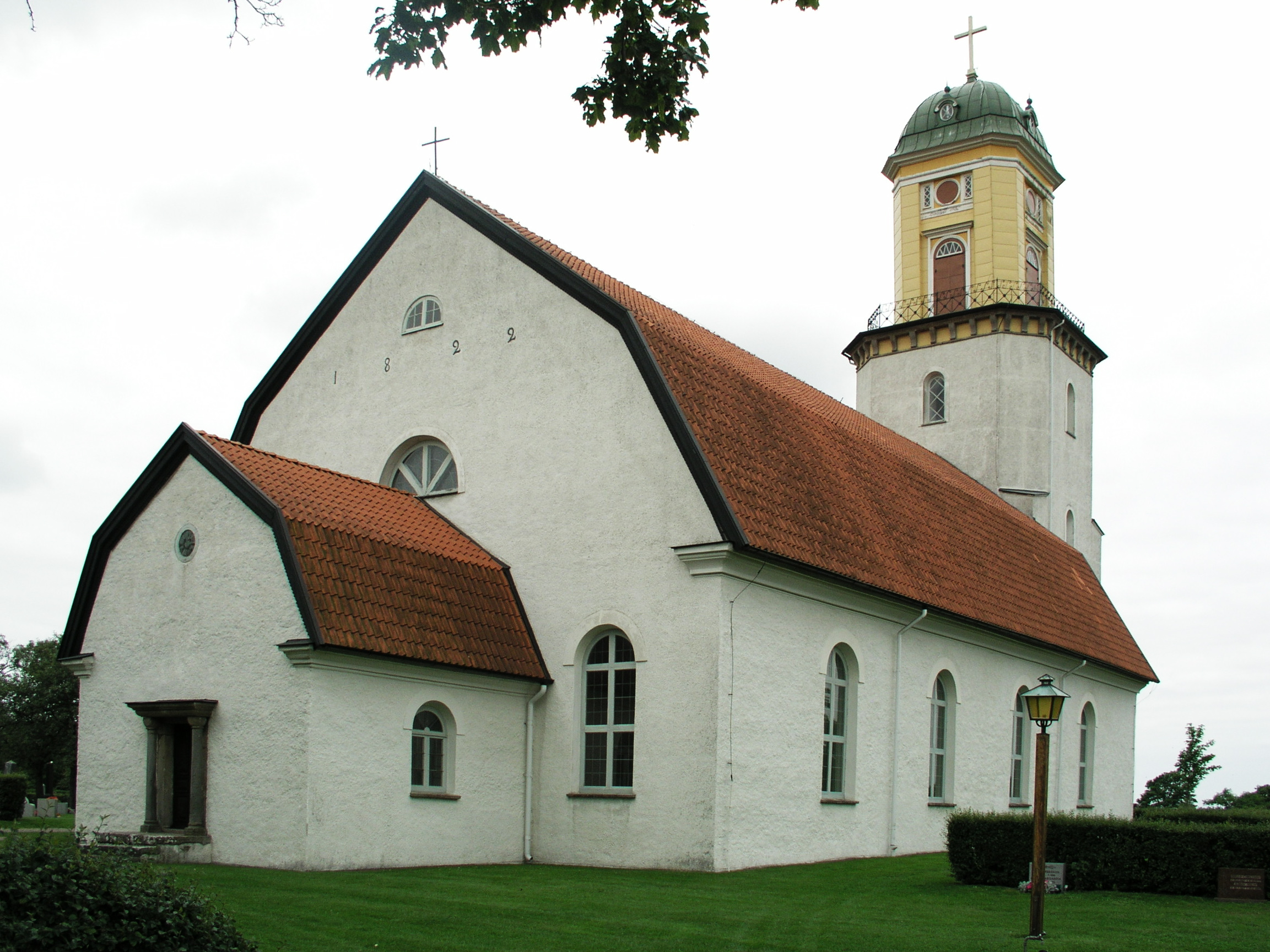
- Algutsrum Church

- Location within Kalmar Location within Sweden
- Coordinates: 56°40′51″N 16°31′49″E
- Country: Sweden
- Province: Öland
- County: Kalmar County
- Municipality: Mörbylånga Municipality

Area
  - Total: 0.57 km^{2} (0.22 sq mi)

Population (31 December 2010)
  - Total: 532
  - Density: 929/km^{2} (2,410/sq mi)
- Time zone: UTC+1 (CET)
  - Summer (DST): UTC+2 (CEST)

Algutsrum is a locality situated in Mörbylånga Municipality, Kalmar County, Sweden with 532 inhabitants in 2010.

Algutsrum Hundred (Swedish: Algutsrums härad) was a hundred of Öland in Sweden.

== Born ==
- Ramon Pascal Lundqvist (born 10 May 1997), footballer
