= Dreki =

Dreki (plural: drekar), Icelandic for "dragon", can refer too:

- Dragon ship, largest class of Norse warship, called "dragon", see Longship
- Norse dragon, dragons of Norse mythology, see Germanic dragon

== Se also ==
- Drakkar (disambiguation)
