= Drakkar =

Drakkar may refer to:

- Dragon (French: drakkar), the largest class of Norse warship, see longship

== French ==
- Baie-Comeau Drakkar, a Canadian junior ice hockey team
- Drakkar, the name of the building in which 58 French paratroopers were killed in the 1983 Beirut barracks bombing
- Drakkar Noir, a line of men's cologne marketed by Guy Laroche

== Music ==
- Drakkar (band), an early-1970s Cambodian hard rock band
- Drakkar Entertainment, German record label
- Drakkar Productions, a French underground black metal record label
- Drakkar Sauna (2003-2015), a country-folk band from Lawrence, Kansas

=== Songs ===
- Drakkar Noir (song), song by French band Phoenix
- Drakkar (NCS song) song by Distrion and Electro-Light

== See also ==
- Dreki
