= Longship =

Specialized Scandinavian warship

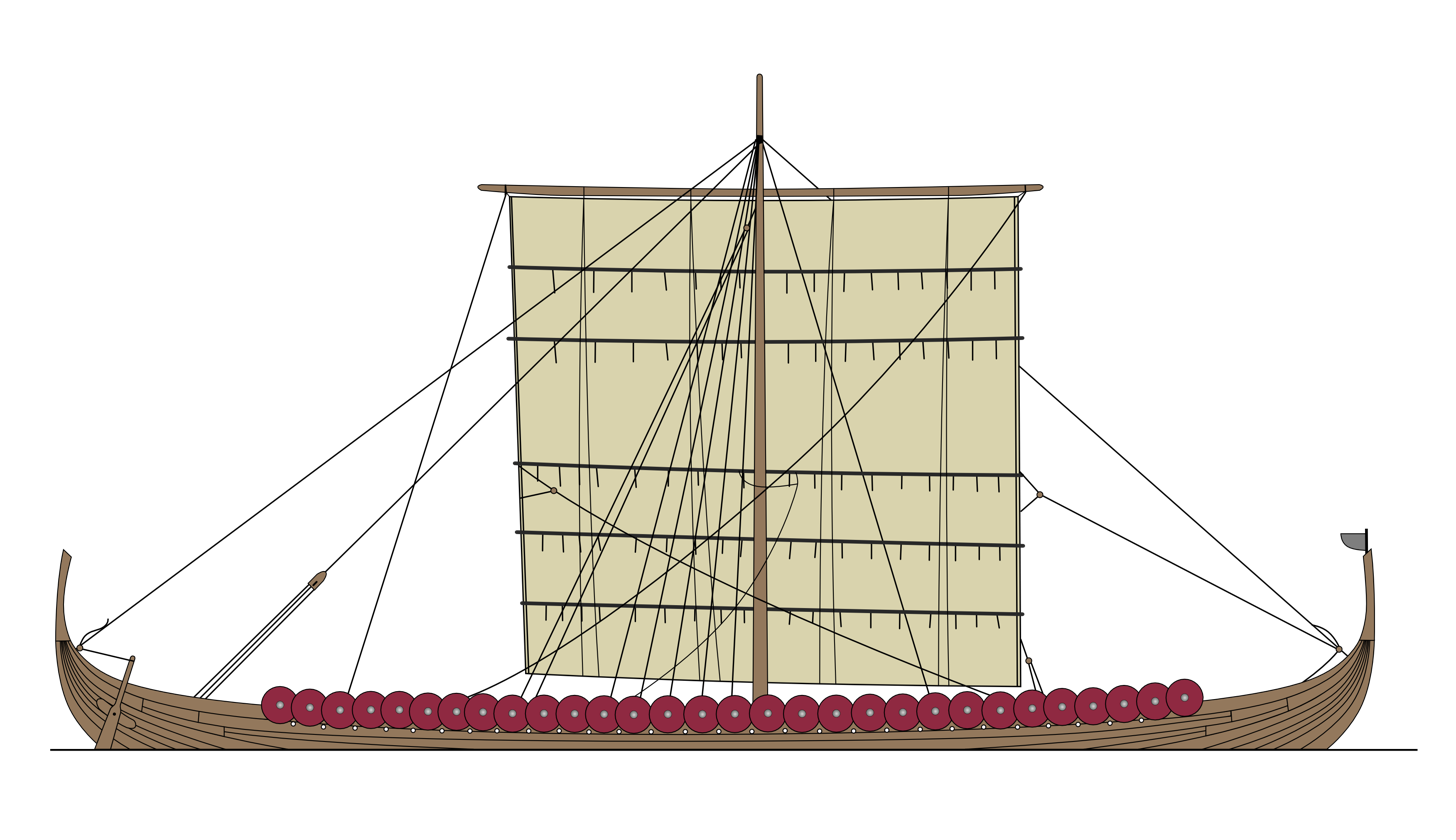
Schematic drawing of the longship type

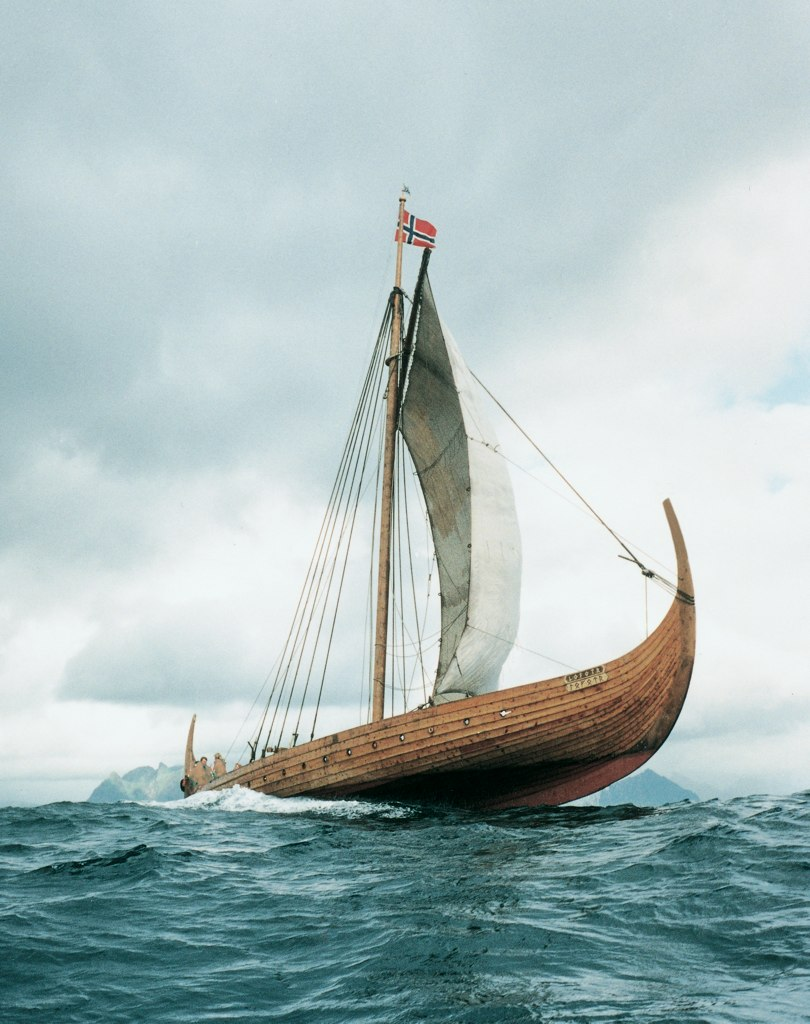
Gokstad ship replica, "Lofotr"

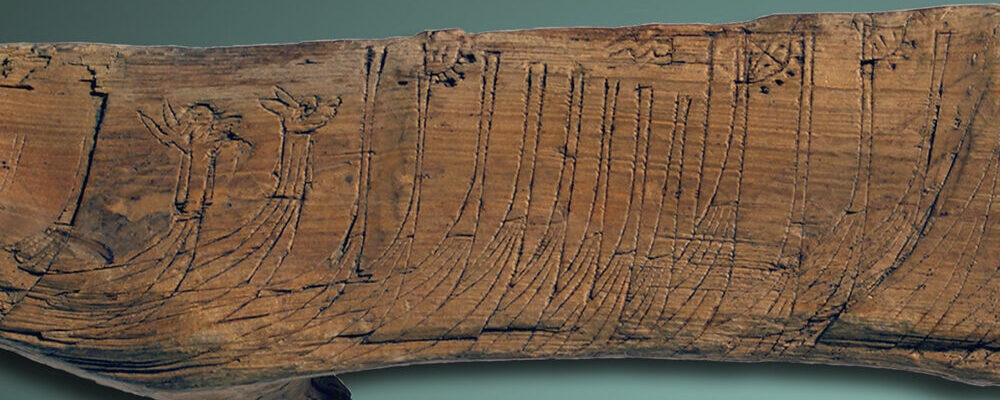
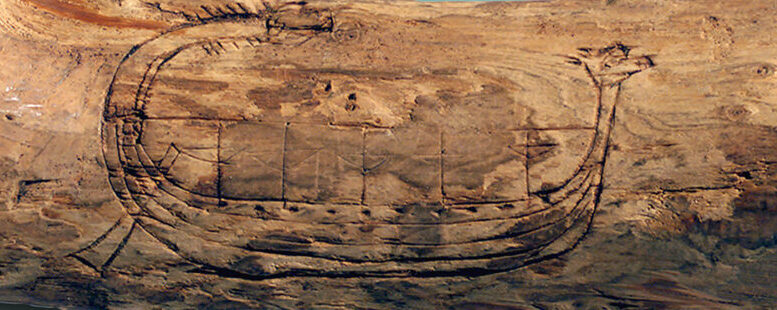
One of the Bryggen runic sticks with graffiti of longships, some featuring dragon heads, or weather vanes, on the bowstem (late 13th c.)

Longships (Old Norse: langskip) were long clinker-built warships (Old Norse: herskip, Old Swedish: hærskip) propelled by oars, and later also by sail, used by the Norse and surrounding Germanic tribes from at least the 4th century AD and throughout the Viking Age, being part of the Nordic ship building tradition. As the name suggests, they were long slender ships, intended for speed, with the ability to carry a large crew of warriors. They are sometimes called "dragonships" (Old Norse: drekaskip) due to a tradition of the fore and aft ends being decorated with a raised dragonhead (Old Norse: drekahofud) and tail respectively, with the sail making up the "wing" of the dragon. The largest types were thus called "dragons" (dreki), while smaller types had names such as karve (karfi), snekke (snekkja), and skeid (skeið). In modern times, the term drakkar exist for longships, originally a French borrowing from Swedish drakar (plural of drake).

Archaeological finds have been made of longships from the 9th, 10th and 11th centuries in Denmark, Norway and Germany, with motifs on Gotlandic picture stones dating to the 8th century or earlier. It is thought that the Norse specifically invented the design for Viking usage, which included raiding and warfare, exploration and commerce. The longship is a rather distinctly Norse (Scandinavian) construction, with bronze age petroglyphs in Sweden indicating a long tradition of building long animal-headed naval ships in Scandinavia. Equivalent clinker-built naval ships by the Wends (a South Baltic Slavic people) were much smaller and shorter in comparison.

The principles leading to the longship's design evolved over a long period of time. A big technological advancement came around 300 AD, when clinker-building was invented, as seen in the Danish Nydam boat and Swedish Björke boat, both from around 320 AD, with their features being subsequently adopted in the ships of other cultures, including those of the Anglo-Saxons, as seen in the 7th century Sutton Hoo ship. They continued to influence naval engineering for centuries, and the character and appearance of these ships have been reflected in Scandinavian boat building traditions to the present day. The particular skills and methods employed in making longships are still used worldwide, often with modern adaptations. They were all made out of wood, with cloth sails (woven wool), and had various details and carvings on the hull.

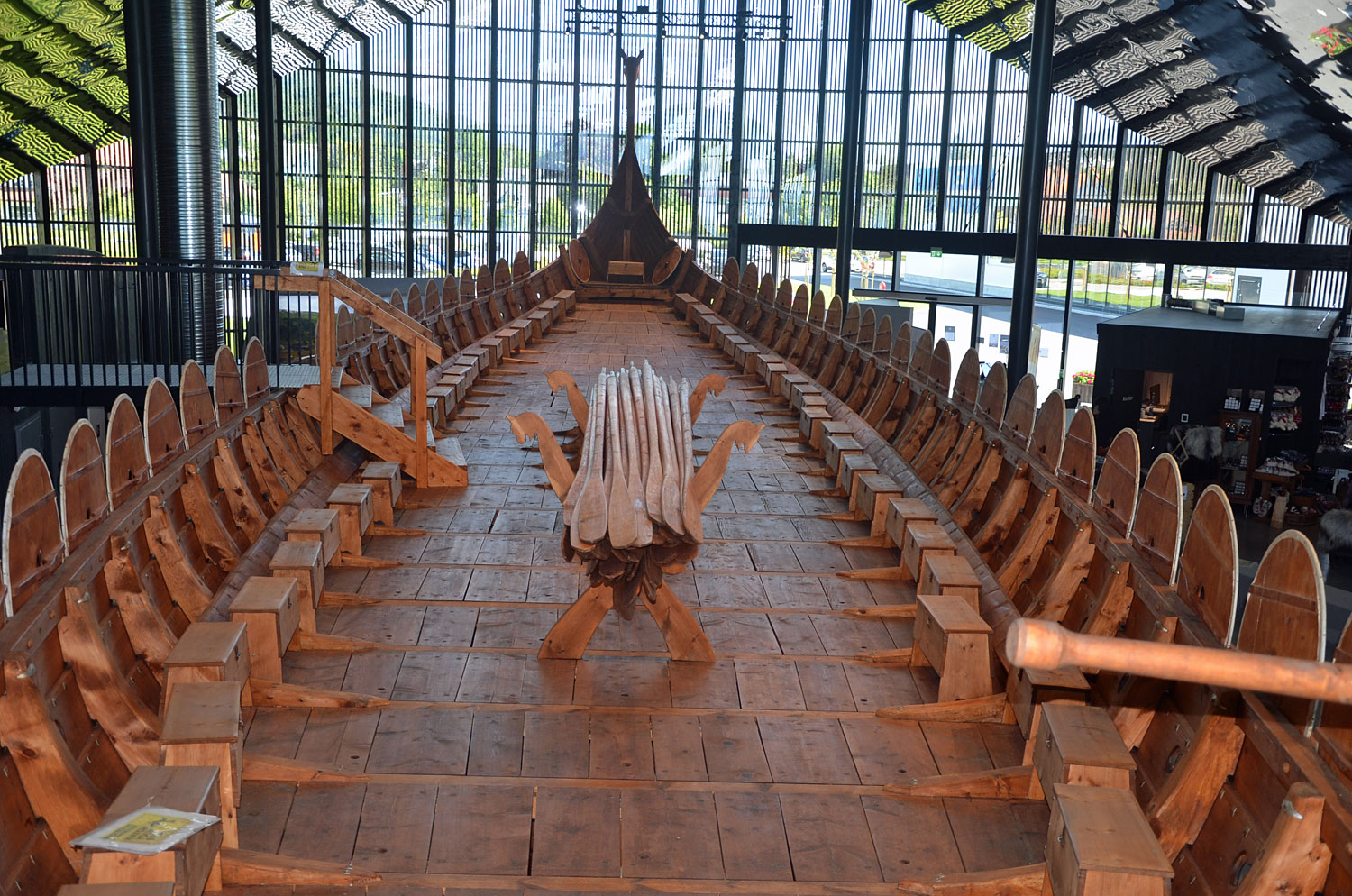
The replica of the Myklebust ship on display at Sagastad. Assumed to be the largest found Viking ship in terms of displacement.

== History ==
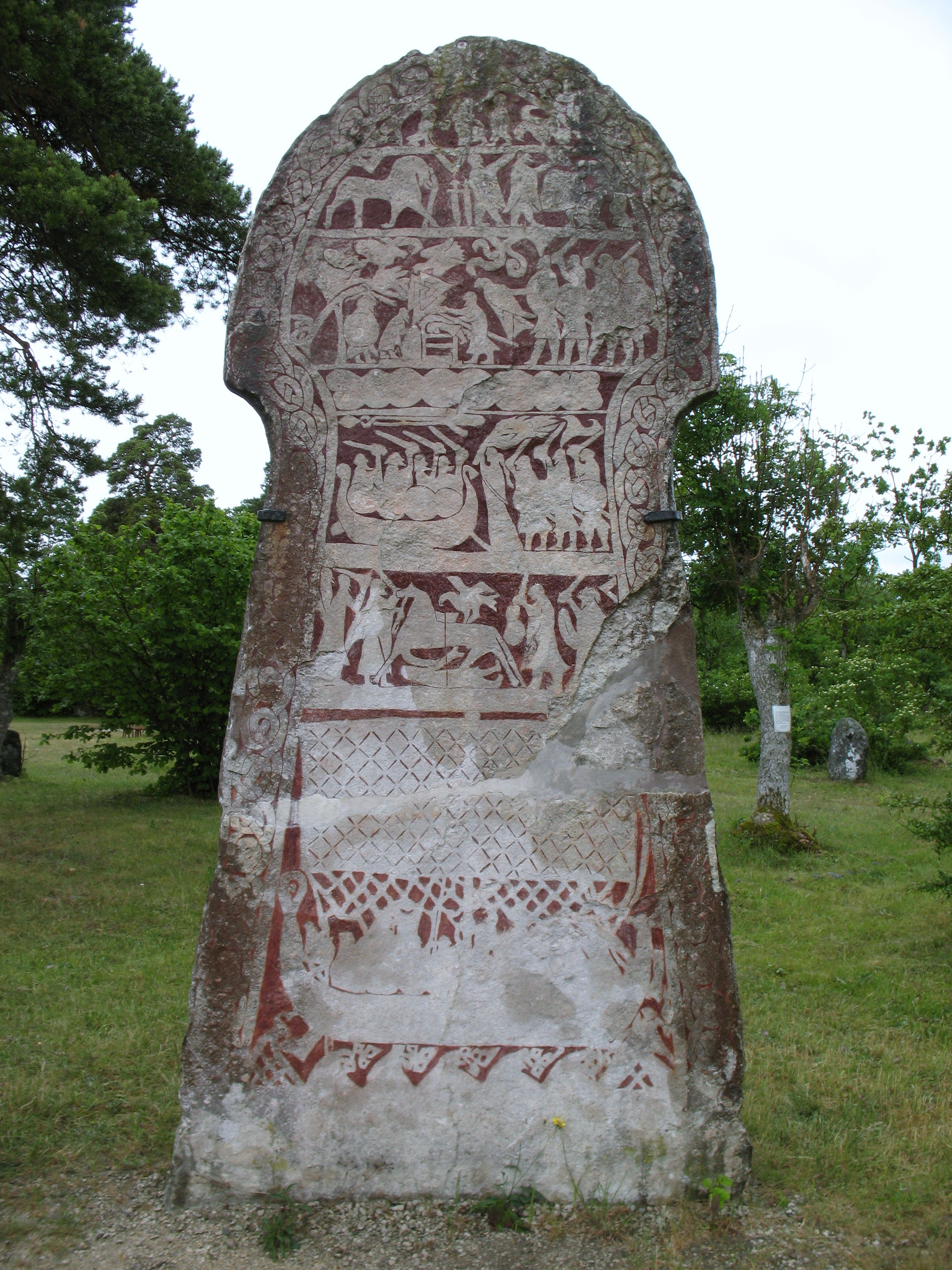
The Stora Hammars I stone, Sweden showing armed warriors in a period longship

The evolution of shipbuilding in Scandinavia was facilitated by development of the iron industry. There was a great increase in iron production in the later Viking Age with the exploitation of bog ore as a source of iron ore to smelt into metal for iron tools, including farm implements and weaponry, as well as shipbuilding tools. With this technology, and the ready availability of seemingly unlimited timber in the vast forests of Norway, the Norsemen acquired a high degree of skill in boat construction. Scandinavians developed the shipbuilding, navigation, and seamanship capabilities needed to exploit the undefended ports and coastlines of continental Europe. They became its foremost maritime people and the Viking Age began with Norse overseas expansion.

The archaeologists Julie Lund and Søren M. Sindbæk cite a dataset generated by a reconstruction of annual summer temperatures over the past 2,000 years that indicates a distinct warming trend in the 8th and 9th centuries, reviving earlier hypotheses that a milder climate was an impetus for the expansion of Norse maritime activity and colonization. Neil Price proposes that the maritime raiding practices which constitute what he calls the "Viking phenomenon" may have begun earlier than ordinarily believed, and beyond the environs of the North Sea. He argues that recent finds such as the Salme ship burials from c. 750 suggest that raiding might have originated in the Baltic region, especially in the east.

The Norse had a well-developed naval architecture, and during the early medieval period, their ship designs were advanced for their time. The ships were owned by coastal farmers, and under the leidang system, every section in the king's realm was required to build warships and to provide men to crew them, allowing the king to quickly assemble a large and powerful war fleet. The historians David Bachrach and Bernard Bachrach say that Viking longships were part of a long tradition of oared warships operating in the northern seas. The main purpose of their warships was to "land troops rather than to engage in combat at sea", and to swiftly carry as many warriors as possible to a scene of conflict. In the 10th century, longships would sometimes be tied together in offshore battles to form a steady platform for infantry warfare. However, examples of more traditional naval combat also exist, such as the Battle of Svolder, where various projectiles and bow and arrow were used, as well as naval boarding.

The Viking longships were powerful naval weapons in their time and were highly valued possessions. Archaeological finds show that the Viking ships were not standardized. Ships varied from designer to designer and place to place and often had regional characteristics. For example, the choice of material was mostly dictated by the regional forests, such as pine from Norway and Sweden, and oak from Denmark. Moreover, each Viking longship had particular features adjusted to the natural conditions under which it was sailed.

During the 9th-century peak of the Viking expansion, large fleets set out to attack the declining Frankish empire by attacking navigable rivers such as the Rhine, the Seine, the Loire and others. Rouen was sacked in 841, the year after the death of Louis the Pious, a son of Charlemagne. Quentovic, near modern Étaples, was attacked in 842 and 600 Danish ships attacked Hamburg in 845. In the same year, 129 ships returned to attack the Seine. They were called "dragonships" by enemies such as the English because some had a dragon-shaped decoration atop the bowstem.

On 1 October 844, when most of the Iberian peninsula was controlled by the Emirate of Córdoba and was known as al-Andalus, a flotilla of about 80 Viking ships, after attacking Asturias, Galicia and Lisbon, ascended the Guadalquivir to Seville, and after a brief siege and heavy fighting, took it by storm on 3 October. They inflicted many casualties and took numerous hostages with the intent to ransom them. Another group of Vikings had gone to Cádiz to plunder while those in Seville waited on Qubtil (Isla Menor), an island in the river, for the ransom money to arrive. Meantime, the emir of Córdoba, Abd ar-Rahman II, prepared a military contingent to meet them, and on 11 November a pitched battle ensued on the grounds of Talayata (Tablada). The Vikings held their ground, but the results were catastrophic for the invaders, who suffered a thousand casualties; four hundred were captured and executed, some thirty ships were destroyed. It was not a total victory for the emir's forces, but the Viking survivors had to negotiate a peace to leave the area, surrendering their plunder and the hostages they had taken to sell as slaves, in exchange for food and clothing.

In 859, a major long-distance Viking expedition set out for al-Andalus. They tried to land at Galicia and were driven off. Then they sailed down the west coast of the peninsula and burned the mosque at Išbīliya (Seville), but were repelled by a large Muslim force there before entering the Mediterranean through the Straits of Gibraltar and burning the mosque at al-Jazīrah (Algeciras), following which they headed south to the Emirate of Nekor in modern Morocco, plundered the city for eight days, and defeated a Muslim force that attempted to stop them.

The Vikings made several incursions into al-Andalus in the years 859, 966 and 971, but with intentions more diplomatic than bellicose, although an attempt at invasion in 971 was frustrated when the Viking fleet was totally annihilated.

== Development ==
=== Pre-historic ships ===
The origin of the longship design can be traced back to the Nordic Bronze Age, as various ships of similar principle can be found on period petroglyphs around Sweden (for example the Rock Carvings in Tanum, spanning about 600 panels dated to between 1800 and 500 BC). Such show various features later found on longships, such as having raised stems fore and aft, sometimes decorated with what appear to be animal heads.

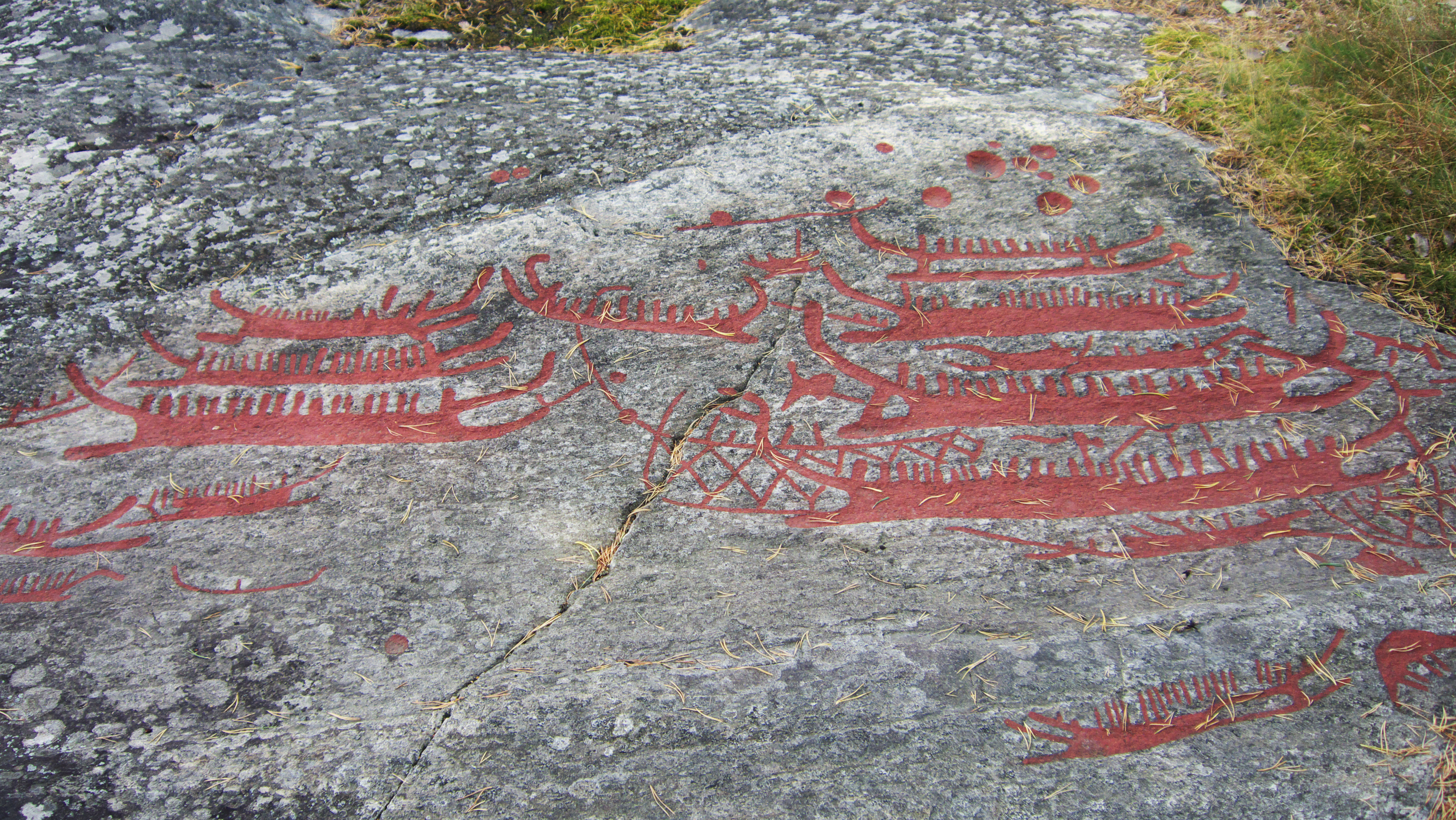
Hemsta petroglyphs of the Nordic Bronze Age

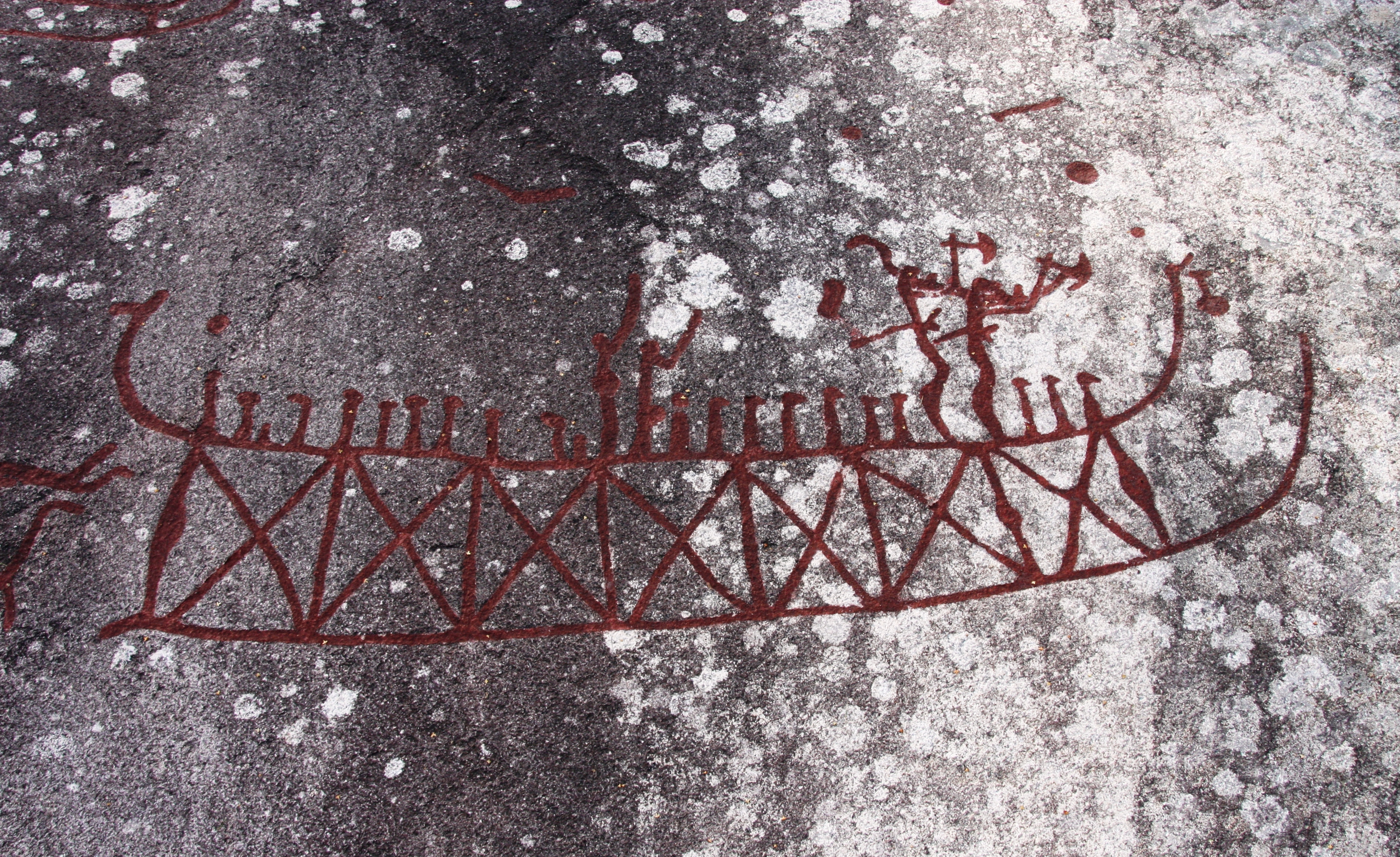
Tanum petroglyphs of the Nordic Bronze Age

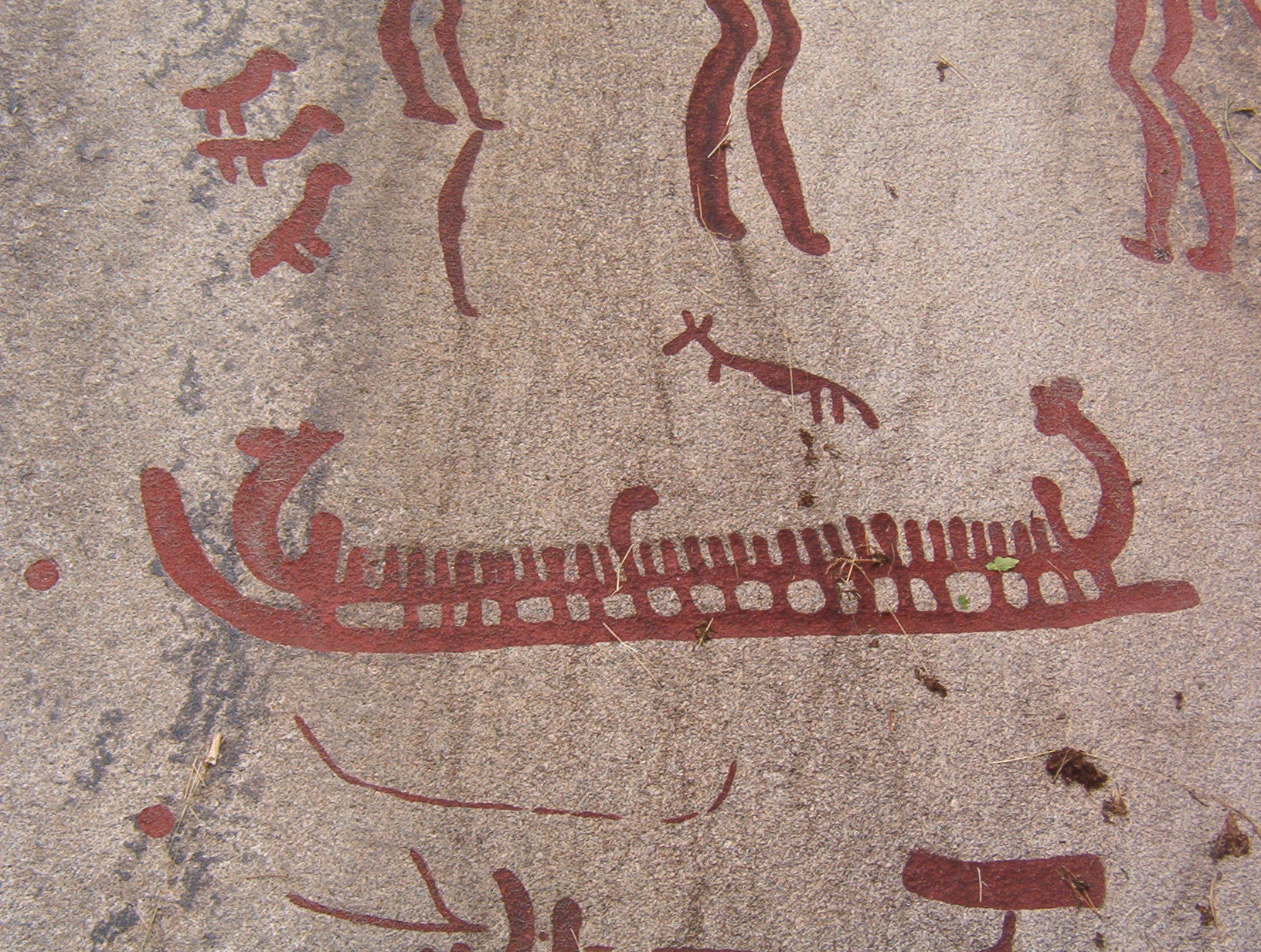
Tanum petroglyphs of the Nordic Bronze Age

The Hjortspring boat, a vessel designed as a large canoe, closely resembles the thousands of petroglyph images of Nordic Bronze Age ships found throughout Scandinavia. Dating to the 4th century BC, it was found in a bog in southern Denmark. About 19 metres (62 ft) long and 2 metres (6 ft 7 in) wide, the boat is the oldest find of a wooden plank-built ship in the Nordic countries. A large array of weaponry, including shields, spears, and swords, was found with the boat.

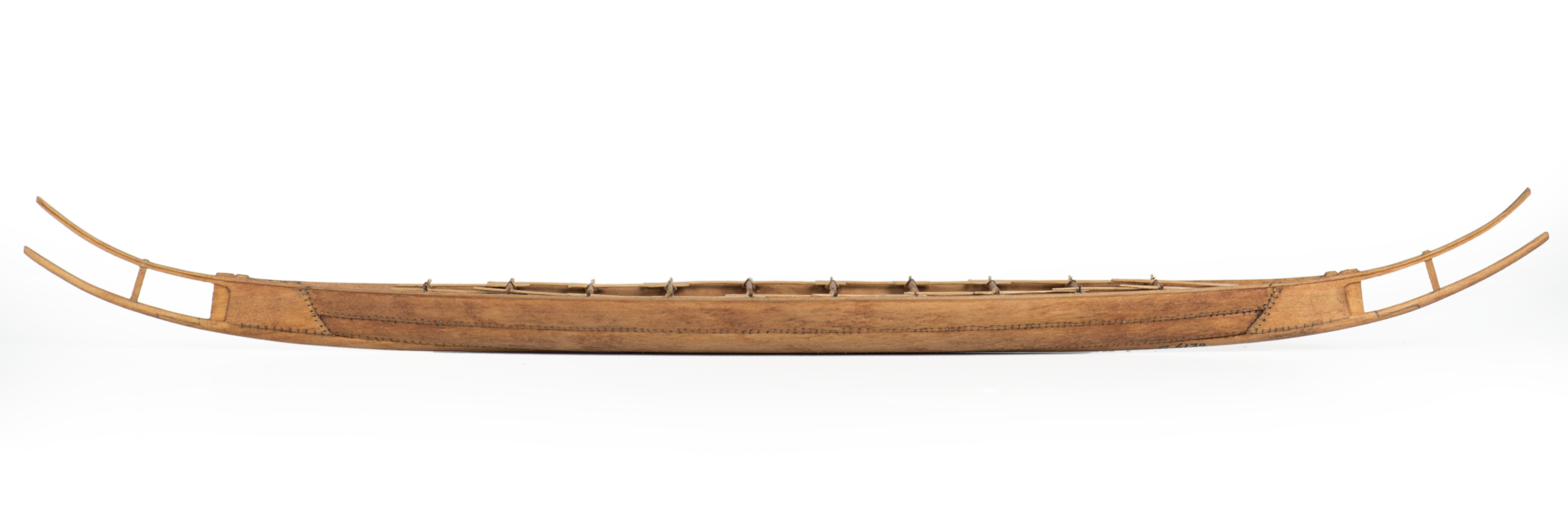
Hjortspring boat design (c. 350 BC: 19 m)

=== Rowed longships ===
The earliest rowed true longship that has been found is the Nydam ship, built in Denmark around 400 AD. It also had very rounded underwater sections but had more pronounced flare in the topsides, giving it more stability as well as keeping more water out of the boat at speed or in waves. It had no sail. It was of lapstrake construction fastened with iron nails. The bow and stern were slightly elevated. The keel was a flattened plank about twice as thick as a normal strake plank but still not strong enough to withstand the downwards thrust of a mast. The ribs were selected from timber that had grown to the specific shape, and were lashed to the planks with lime-bast rope through raised "cleats" (spacers) on the inside that had been shaped from the solid timber.

A later development of this style of ship is the Sutton Hoo ship, found in an Anglo-Saxon grave in Sutton Hoo, England, dating to around 620. The Anglo-Saxons were at this time very cognate to the Norse, and the finds in the grave shows a close relation between these cultures. Albeit completely rotted away, the remnant shape in the earth shows a low prow and stern like the Nydam ship, with a total length of 27 metres (89 ft).

The Kvalsund ship, one of two vessels found in a Danish bog, was built in the late 8th century. According to the dendrochronology research team led by Sæbjørg Walaker Nordeide, a specialist in Medieval archaeology, the Kvalsund ship is a link in the transition from the ship technology of the early Iron Age to that of the Viking Age. They say that based on dendrochronological dating of the wooden remains, the trees used to construct the two vessels are estimated to have been felled at the end of the 8th century, ca. 780–800, dating the vessels to "the threshold of the Viking Age". The ship, known as Kvalsund II to distinguish it from the boat that was found with it, is estimated to be 18 m (59 feet) long and 3.2 m (10 feet) wide, with 10 pairs of oars. A mast was found, but it is not known to which it belonged.

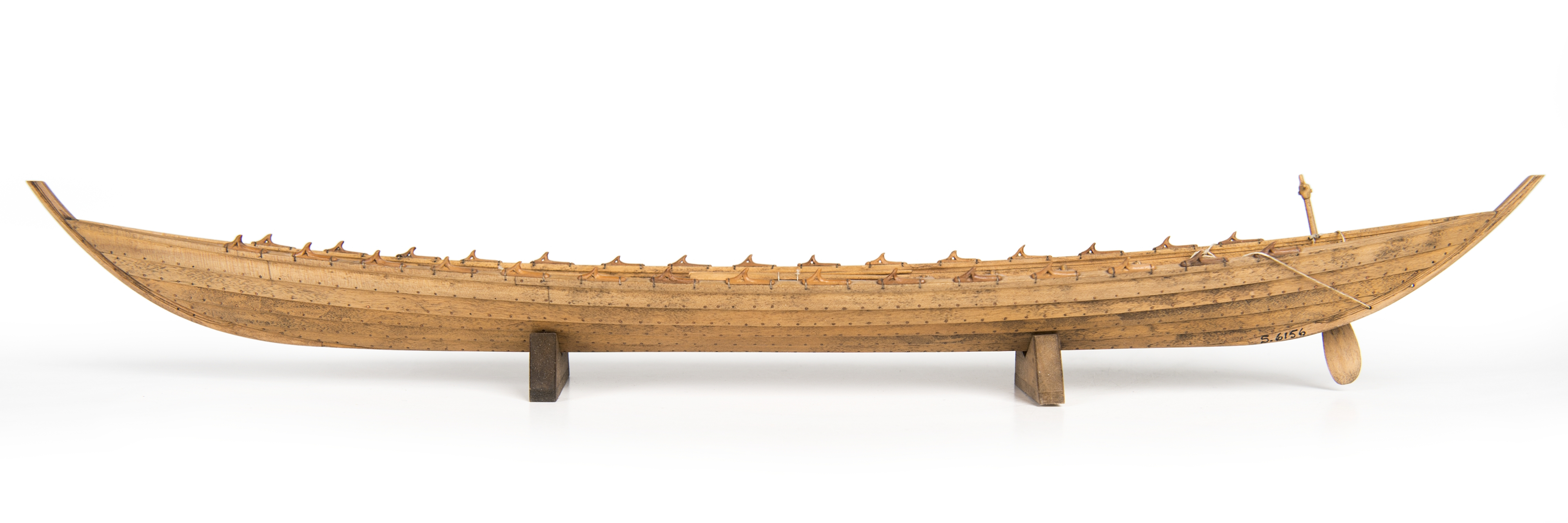
Nydam ship design (c. 320 AD: 23 m)

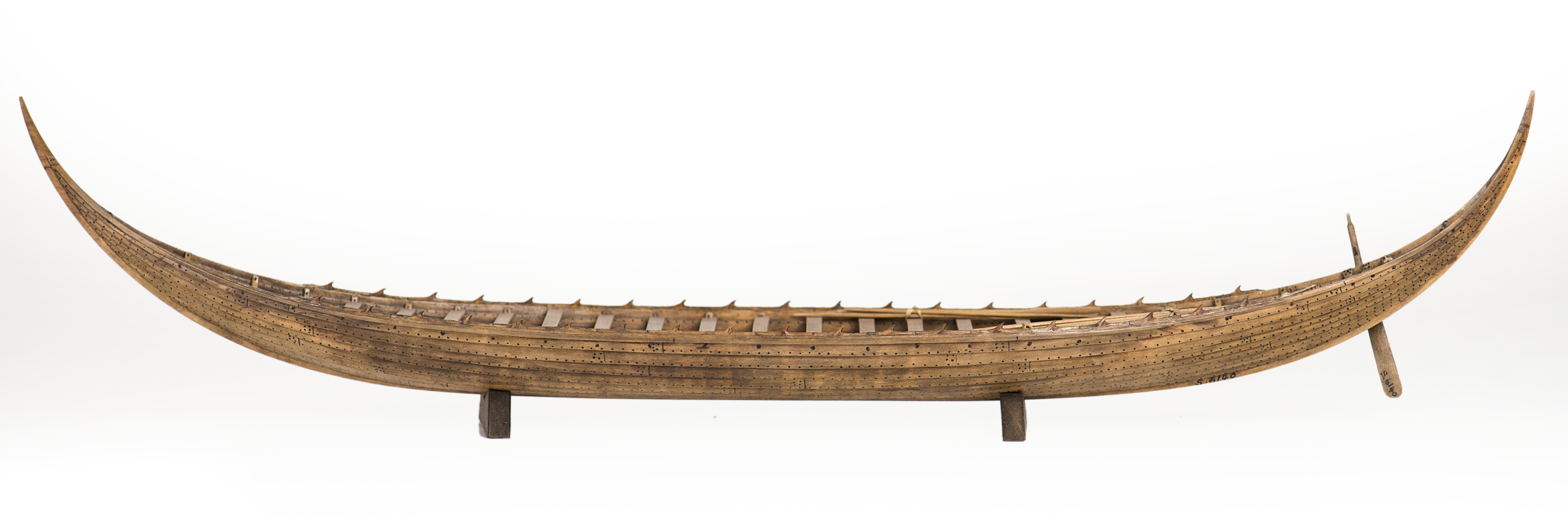
Sutton Hoo ship design (c. 600 AD: 27 m)

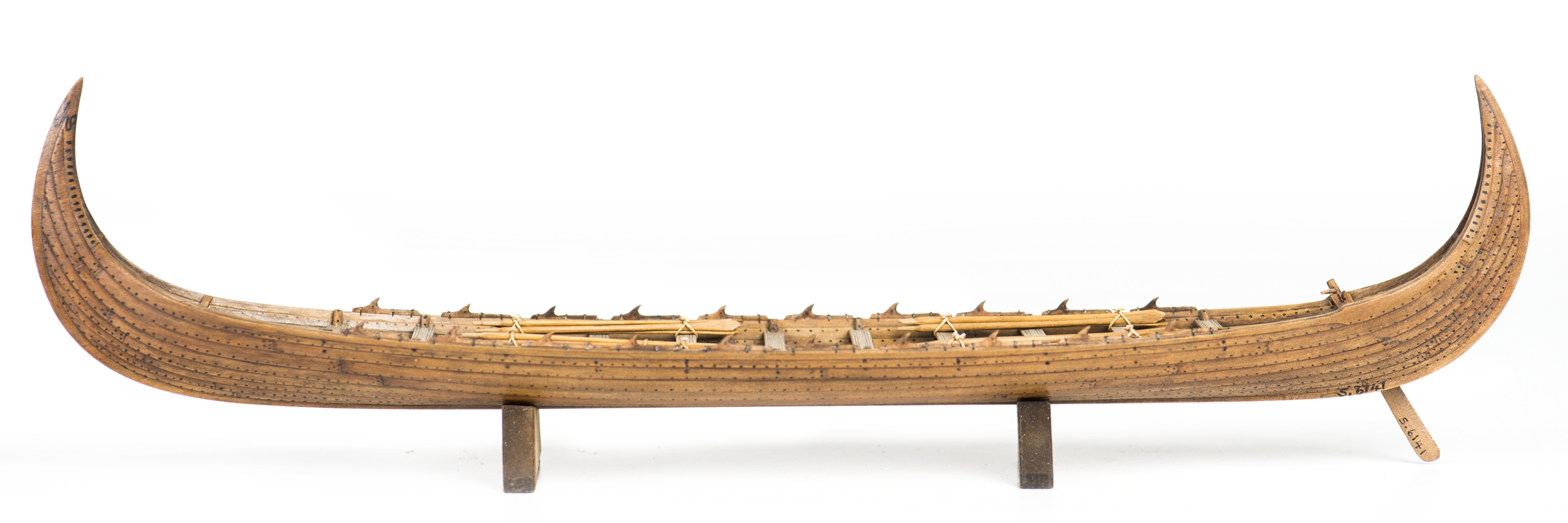
Kvalsund ship design (c. 780 AD: 18 m)

=== Sailed longships ===
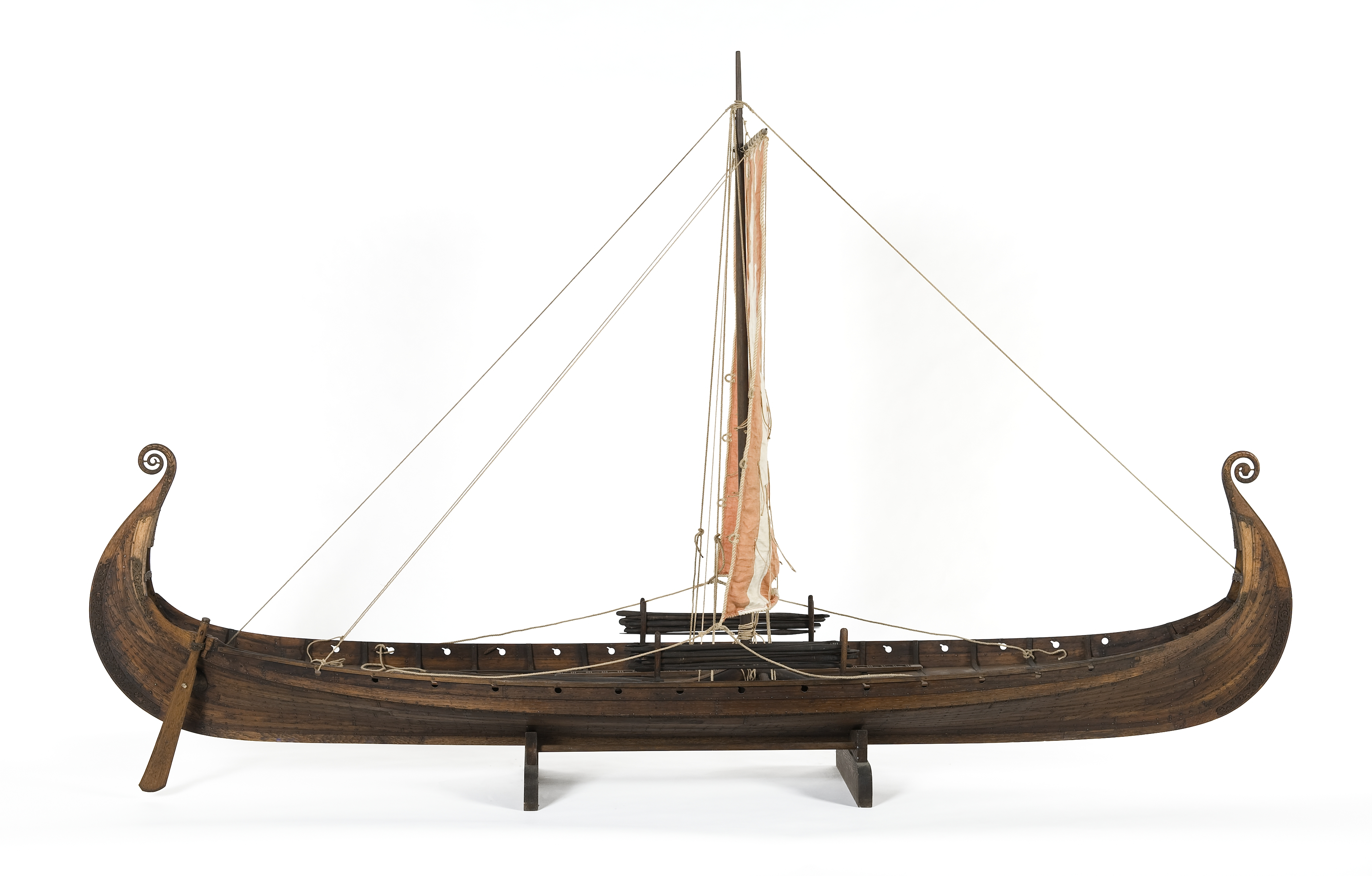
Oseberg ship design (c. 800 AD: 22 m)

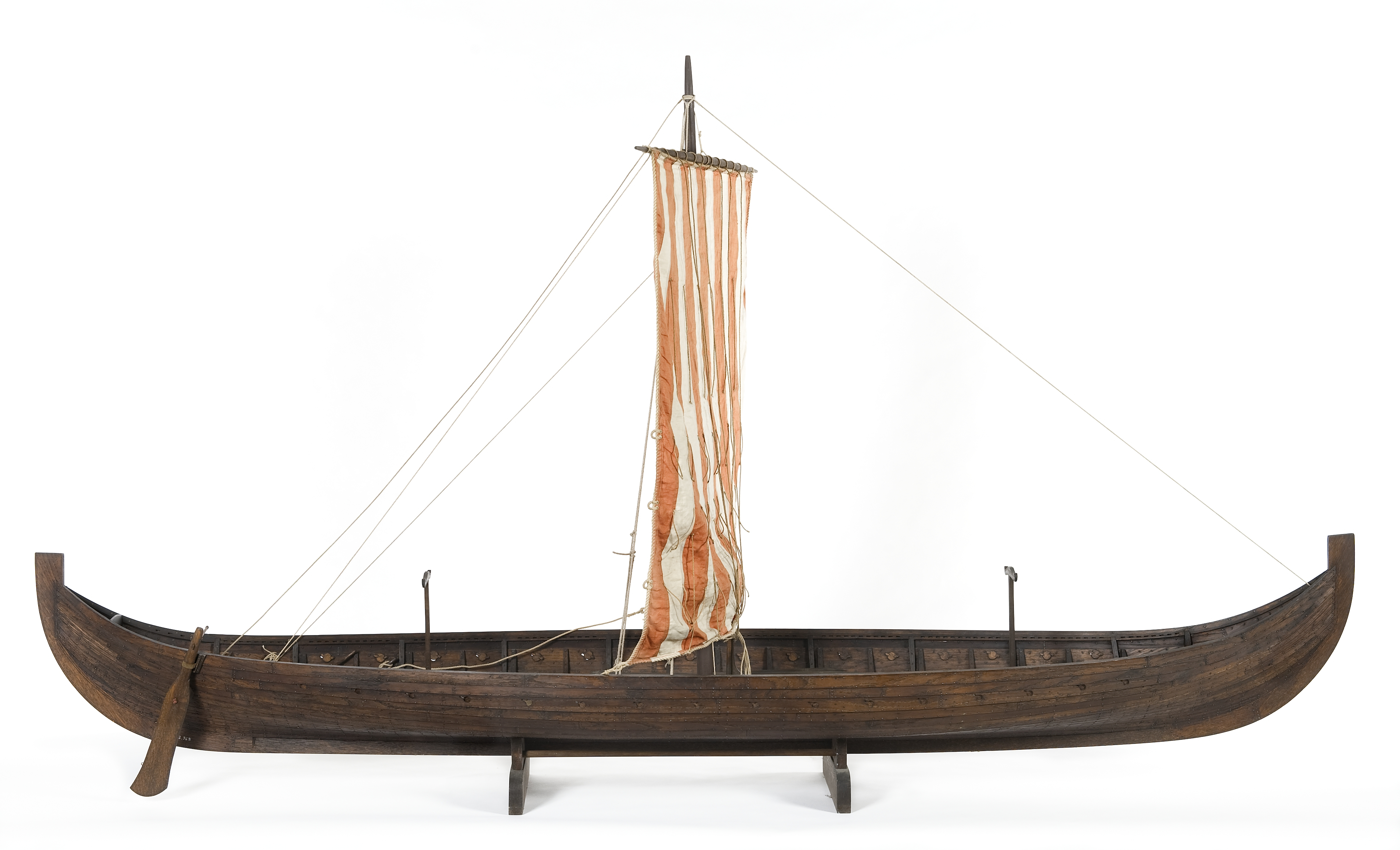
Gokstad ship design (c. 890 AD: 24 m)

== Types of longships ==
There was no single type of Viking ship: there were many kinds. The archeologist and historian Olaf Olsen and the maritime archaeologist Ole Crumlin-Pedersen say that according to the sagas, a Viking ship had to have at least 13 pairs of oars to be regarded as a longship and at least 25 pairs of oars to be considered a great-ship. They varied in size from about 6 to 25 metres (20 to 82 ft), were powered either by oars or by sail and oars, and were built for various purposes, such as warfare, fishing, or trade. Longships can be classified into a number of different types, depending on size, construction details, and the prestige of the owner. The word 'longship' appears to describe ships characterized by their length, rather than being a name for a ship type. The most common way to classify longships is by the number of rowing positions on board. The proper type names for ships in this category were skeið, dreki, askr and snekkja.

Crumlin-Pedersen refers to the word 'longship' as being commonly used to mean the "swift raiding vessels and landing crafts of the Vikings". Longships made it possible for the Vikings to raid the coastal regions of Western Europe and to sail up its rivers. The Vikings were successful in warfare with these ships of advanced design, using them in sea operations as landing vessels for warriors to be deployed in land battle. Longships also enabled the establishment of permanent Scandinavian settlements in the Northern Isles of Scotland, parts of Ireland, the Danelaw area of England, and Normandy in France.

According to Judith Jesch, a scholar of the Viking Age and Old Norse language and literature, the Old Norse word langskip occurs just twice in the skaldic stanzas. 'Longship' is used only once in the Anglo-Saxon Chronicle, in the form langscip, in an entry for the year 896 that describes King Alfred's part in the Anglo-Saxon and Viking warfare of the late 9th century. In the Chronicle and other Anglo-Saxon written sources, the Danish ships are called æscas or they are referred to by the type names snekkja, skeið or dreki. Crumlin-Pedersen says skeið appears to have been the most common name for longships in Scandinavia.

Modern-day knowledge of Viking ships comes from iconography such as the pictures found on runestones, in written accounts, especially the Old Norse sagas, and finds of the remains of actual ships. The philologist Eldar Heide argues that most classification schemes used in introductions to the subject of old Scandinavian ship types, such as knorr, snekkja, or karfi, are problematic, and calls for more emphasis on research of the textual evidence to understand what they were called and what they were like. Jesch says that any kind of Scandinavian ship could be long, and that longship is not a technical term. She says furthermore that text in the skaldic corpus calling a large warship a dragon, whether or not it has a dragonhead prow, is more likely a poetical conceit rather than a technical term for warships.

Ole Crumlin-Pederson was the founder of the Viking Ship Museum in Roskilde and made important contributions to maritime archaeology research. According to Crumlin-Pedersen, information on the origin and dating of early ships from Northern Europe can "be determined by independent natural scientific methods, primarily by dendrochronology", and it is not necessary to use sequential typology to date archaeological finds of such vessels.

=== Karve (karfi) ===
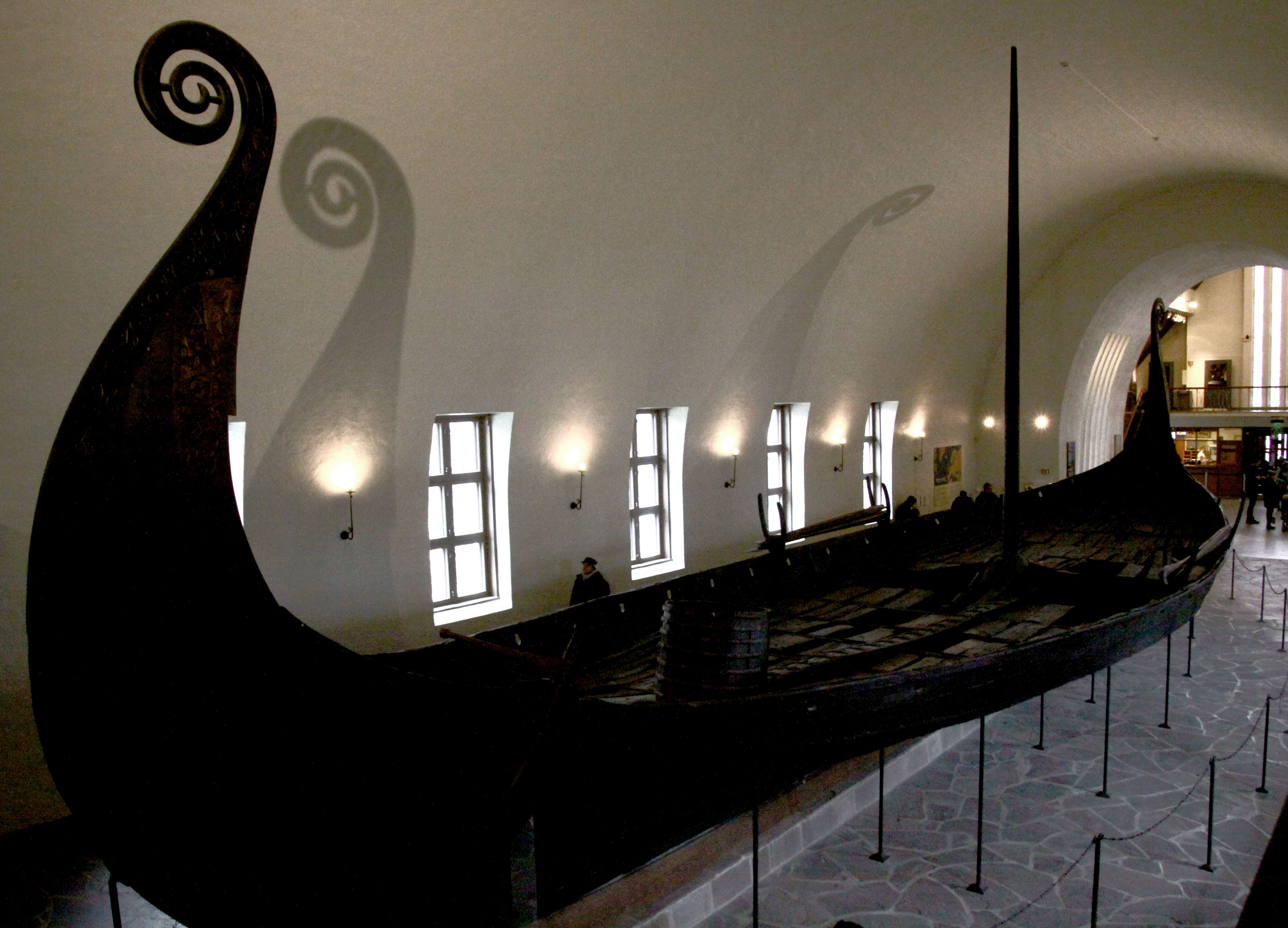
The Oseberg ship, a karve from around 834 AD.

The karve, or karvi (Old Norse: karfi; Old Swedish: karve; Old East Slavic: корабль, korablĭ; also a Proto-Finnic form of Finnish: karvas, "small boat"), is the smallest vessel that is considered a longship. The Gokstad ship is a famous Viking ship that was probably a karvi built around the end of the 9th century and buried c. 900; it was excavated in 1880 by Nicolay Nicolaysen. It is nearly 24 m (79 feet) long with 16 rowing positions, i.e., it carried 32 oarsmen.

=== Snekke (snekkja / snacc) ===
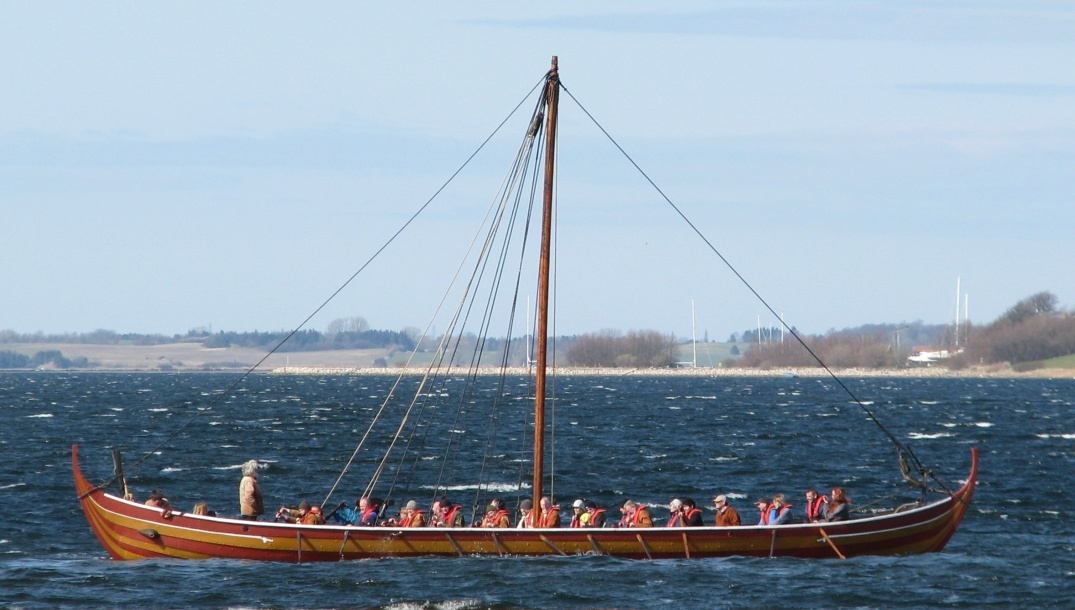
Replica of the snekke Skuldelev 5

The snekke (Old Norse: snekkja, Old Danish: snække, Old Swedish: snækkia, Old English: snacc) was one of the most common types of ships. With 13 benches, that is, 26 oarsmen, a snekke was regarded as the smallest ship usable for warfare. Jesch writes that eight skaldic stanzas use the word snekkja, with seven of them dating to the mid-11th century. She says it is clearly related to the Old English snacc, but its etymology is uncertain. The name survives for a smaller boat type in the Nordic countries; in Danish: snekke, Norwegian: snekke, Swedish: snäcka; also in German as Schnigge (Middle Low German: snicke, Low German: snick), and Dutch as snik (Old Saxon: snik, snikke, Middle Dutch: snicke); although in Swedish, the most commonly used term is "snipa", which has historically been translated as "gig".

=== Skeid (skeið / scegð) ===
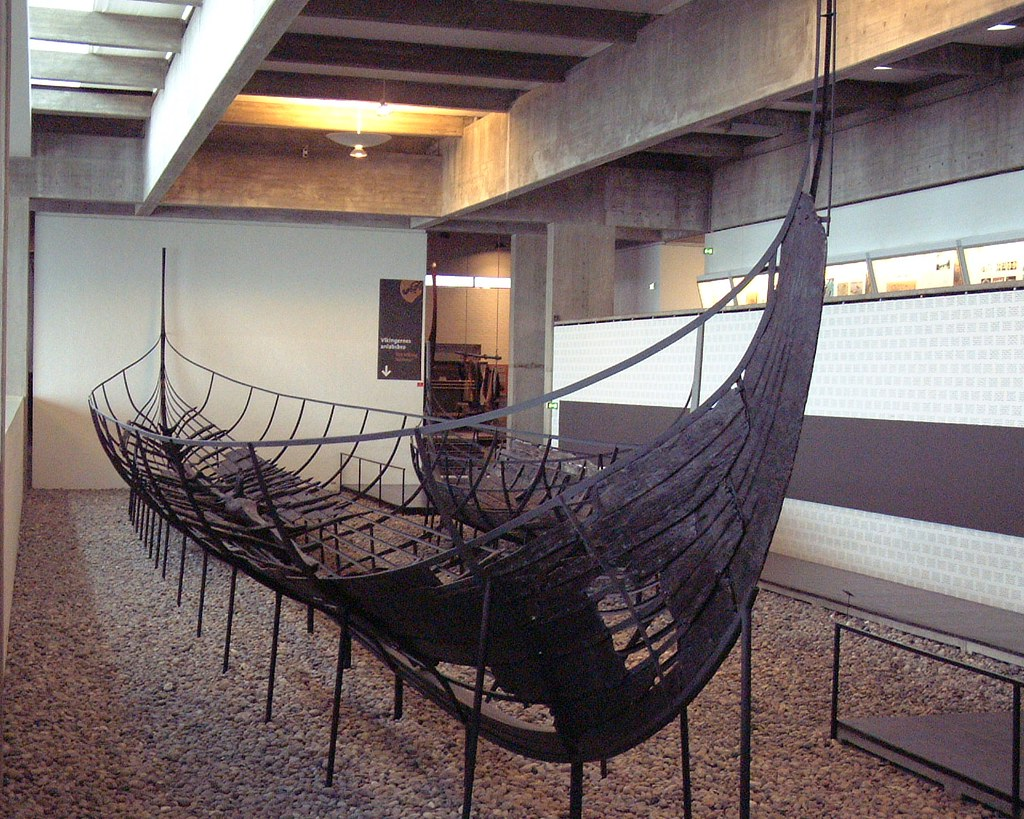
The skeid Skuldelev 2

Skeid (Old West Norse: skeið; Old East Norse: skæið, (Note: Södermanland Runic Inscription 171: ᛋᚴᛅᛁᚦᛅᚱ ᛫ ᚢᛁᛋᛁ, skaiþaʀ · uisi, Old East Norse: skæiðaʀ vīsi, "ship's leader") *skeði; Old East Slavic: скедии, skedii; Old English: scegð), meaning 'skid, slider, cleaver (of water)', with the connotation of "speeder", was a type of narrow and fast longship.

A Viking Age skeid known as Skuldelev 2, a long, slender warship about 30 metres (98 ft) long, was discovered in the Roskilde finds of 1962. Dendrochronology shows that this vessel was built in Dublin around 1042. Skuldelev 2 had 30 benches and could carry a crew of 65 to 70. It was likely a skeid, and considering its size certainly belonged to a high-ranking chieftain, according to the linguist Angus Somerville and the historian R. Andrew McDonald. In 1996–97 archaeologists discovered the remains of another ship in the harbor. This ship, called the Roskilde 6, is the longest Viking ship ever discovered and has been dated to around 1025. It was 36 metres (118 ft) long and had a beam of 3.5 metres (11 ft). The vessel drew about 1 metre (3.3 ft) of water, and carried about 100 men, including 78 rowers. Skuldelev 2 was replicated as Seastallion from Glendalough (Havhingsten fra Glendalough) at the Viking Ship Museum in Roskilde and launched in 2004.

=== Dragon (dreki / ormr) ===
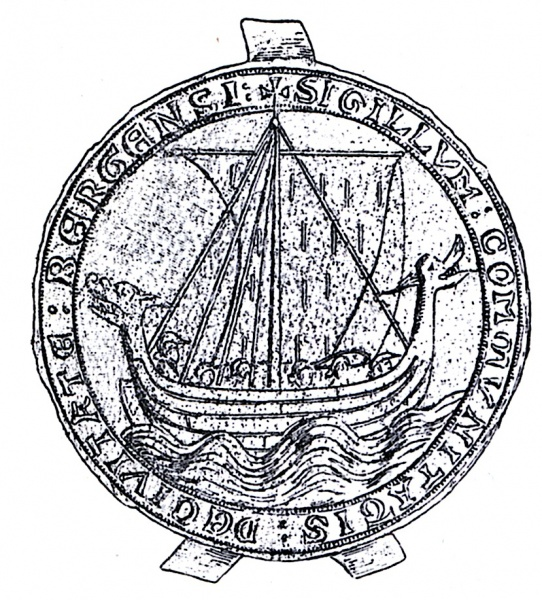
The city seal of Bergen depicts a Viking longship—possibly a dreki.

The term "dragon" (Old West Norse: dreki, Old East Norse: draki; also Old Norse: ormʀ, lit. 'worm', "serpent, dragon") was used for ships with thirty rooms and upwards. These ships were likely skeids that differed only in the carvings of the head and tail of a flying dragon, carried on the prow and stern of the ship. Judith Jesch, an expert in runic inscriptions, says, "The word dreki for a ship derives from this practice of placing carved dragonheads on ships... but there is no evidence that it was a technical term for any particular kind of ship."

The earliest mentioned dreki was the ship of unstated size owned by Harald Fairhair in the 10th century. Short says that warships were measured by the number of rúm, "rooms", they contained, a room being the space between the crossbeams, a little less than 1 metre (39 in). A room could accommodate two oars, one on each side of the ship. According to N.A.M. Rodger, ships of 30 rooms or more were very unusual. The first drekki ship whose size is known was Olav Tryggvason's 30 room Tranin (Crane), built at Nidaros in 995. His later ship Ormrinn langi (Long Serpent) of 34 room (assumed to be 45 metres (148 ft) long) built during the winter of 999 to 1000, was the most well-known of such ships in this period. The common word for dragon in old Germanic languages such as Old Norse was not "dragon" (dreki), but rather "serpent", specifically "worm" (Old Norse: ormr, Old English: wyrm, Old High German: wurm). This is mirrored in the name "Long Serpent" (Ormrinn langi), or "Long Dragon", as given by the philologist Hans-Peter Naumann, for example.

The city seal of Bergen, Norway, created in 1299, depicts a ship with a dragon's head at either end, which might be intended to represent a dreki ship.

== Propulsion ==
The longships had two methods of propulsion: oars and sail. At sea, the sail enabled longships to travel faster than by oar and to cover long distances overseas with far less manual effort. Sails could be raised or lowered quickly. Oars were used when near the coast or in a river, to gain speed quickly, and when there was an adverse (or insufficient) wind. In combat, the variability of wind power made rowing the chief means of propulsion. The ship was steered by a vertical flat blade with a short round handle, at right angles, mounted over the starboard side of the aft gunwale.

Longships were not fitted with actual benches, and apparently had movable seats. When rowing, the oarsmen may have sat on sea chests (chests containing their personal possessions) that would otherwise take up space. These chests would be brought aboard the ship when it was manned. Oars were fashioned of varying lengths according to their position in the ship. In the construction of longships, rounded or rectangular oarports were cut through the upper strake on both sides along the full length of a warship, while on merchant ships they were fitted only near the ends.

An innovation that improved the sail's performance was the beitass (Old Norse), a wooden luff or tacking spar that stiffened the sail, thus allowing the vessel to tack (sail into the wind, on a zig-zag course). It was used especially on the knarr. The windward performance of the ship was poor by modern standards as there was no centreboard, deep keel or leeboard. To assist in tacking, the beitass kept the luff taut. A step was built into the ship just forward of the mast with one or two sockets on each side. The heel of the beitass was stepped into one of these when the vessel was underway. Sometimes blocks of wood were treenailed to the sides of the hull, with each hole angled forward to receive the end of the tacking spar.

== Navigation ==
During the Viking Age (900–1200 AD) Vikings were the dominant seafarers of the North Atlantic. One of the keys to their success was the ability to navigate skillfully across the open waters. According to the medievalist and archaeologist, James Graham-Campbell, however they achieved their navigational feats, the Vikings appear to have developed ocean navigation to a high degree, possibly using innate skills that modern people have forgot they possess. They sailed their ships from Arctic waters to the Volga River and the Caspian Sea and across the Atlantic Ocean to North America. They could not have accomplished these feats without a mastery of seamanship and navigation. They used their ships to raid coastal towns, but also went on trading expeditions and made voyages to explore foreign lands and establish new settlements.

The steersman was the skipper (styrimaðr) of the vessel and set its course and speed, sailing by observation of the sea, the sky, and the wind, as well as by weather signs such as the behaviour of seabirds. The maritime archaeologist Timm Weski cites Schnall for the information that a number of coastal currents are mentioned in the Nordic sources, along with the danger they represented to sailors, who, however, seemed to pay no attention to currents on the open sea. They did not take them into account when steering a course in a long-distance passage, nor did they take advantage of following currents that would have given them a boost in their direction of travel.

The historian and research scientist Tatjana N. Jackson writes that when Vikings began to migrate from Norway to Iceland in the 9th century, they brought with them the names of the four cardinal directions: norðr, austr, suðr, and vestr, as well as the names of the ordinal directions, those that referred to the features of the western coast of Norway. Consequently landnorðr ('north by the land') meant north-east, útnorðr ('north and out, away') meant north-west, while landsuðr meant south-east, and útsuðr south-west.

According to the Old Norse philologist and runologist Tristan Mueller-Vollmer writing with Kirsten Wolf, a specialist in Old Norse and Scandinavian linguistics, it is nearly certain that the Vikings could set their latitude on a voyage, but little is known of how they might have done this. Viking mariners probably depended on oral headings when they set a course to sail, having no magnetic compass and no charts. They likely used basic celestial navigation, tracking the sun's movement during the day and the position of the stars at night, primarily Polaris, called leidarstjarna (lode star) in Old Norse. However, the Pole Star would only have been visible in the early and late parts of the sailing season because of the long hours of summer daylight in the north. Weski says that nowadays the position of the Pole Star is almost directly overhead at the pole, but in 1000 it circled around the pole at a distance of about 7° in the sky.

Þorsteinn Vilhjálmsson, a specialist in the medieval history of science in Iceland and Norway, considers the voyages to Vinland made by the Vikings as "the crowning medieval Norse achievement in the field of seamanship and navigation." They were the culmination of hundreds of years of experience sailing across the northern Atlantic. The influence of these voyages on later historic events may have been negligible, but they had a lasting impact as an essential part of the Norse heritage of the Icelandic sagas.

=== Sunstone hypothesis ===
According to the scientific journal Philosophical Transactions of the Royal Society, the Danish archaeologist Thorkild Ramskou in 1969 proposed that so-called "sunstones" might have been used by the Vikings to determine the azimuth direction of the sun, even when it is or obscured by clouds or mist or below the horizon. Sightings of the sun's position at sunrise and sunset were necessary for their ships to stay on course. These sightings would frequently be obstructed by thin layers of fog or low clouds, even though the sky overhead remained blue. Under such conditions, he theorized that sunstones could have been used to determine the position of the obscured sun because of their property of polarizing light. These stones, crystals of Iceland spar (a variety of calcite), or of cordierite, are doubly refracting, meaning that objects viewed through them appear to be doubled.

In 1975, the maritime historian Uwe Schnall published a study, Navigation der Wikinger, about Viking-Age navigation based on Old Norse texts held at the University of Göttingen. Schnall wrote that navigational aids such as the supposed '"sun stone" (sólarsteinn), often associated with sun compasses, are mentioned only once in the Icelandic sagas, in the second section of Snorri's Heimskringla, a biography of Saint Olaf, "St. Olaf's Saga". The story is about a wager between King Olaf and the farmer Sigurծr, but not in a navigational setting. Sigurծr declared that he could find the sun's position in the sky, even though it was an overcast day with snow being blown in the wind. King Olaf held a sunstone in the air and viewed the sun, confirming Sigurծr's claim. Schnall says that all other references to sólarsteinn concern precious stones, which were not used to navigate.

No sunstone has ever been found in Viking archaeological investigations. Consequently it is not known if Vikings ever actually used sunstones, but they could have been useful navigational aids, as much of the area they sailed over and explored in the North Atlantic was near polar latitudes, where the sun is very close to the horizon for much of the year.

An astronomer for the Smithsonian Astrophysical Observatory, Bradley E. Schaefer, writes that there is no useful textual, ethnographic, or archaeological evidence for the use of "sunstones" as celestial navigation aids, thus their nature is unknown. He declares that his extensive tests with "many crystals, many configurations, and many cloud conditions, all throughout the North Atlantic around Iceland and Greenland" show that in real-world practice, the crystals perform very poorly and can be used to determine the sun's direction "only when the sky has large blue patches", in which case its location is already obvious from observations with the naked eye.

=== Sun compass ===
According to the archaeologist and researcher Colleen Batey, although some scholars have proposed that the Vikings sailed by latitude on their Atlantic voyages, it is unknown whether they could estimate the altitude of the Pole Star by eye in their navigation, or whether they had some simple instrument for this purpose. She notes that Captain Søren Thirslund and the Danish archaeologist Christen Vebæk suggested that Vikings might have used a rudimentary sun compass. Although It is difficult to estimate directions when the sun is not due South, on voyages of at least a few days with little change in latitude it can be done fairly accurately. Thirslund and Vebæk hypothesize that using a sun compass permitted the Vikings to estimate their sailing direction much more accurately, possibly within a range of ±5°.

In 1946–1948, Christen Vebæk excavated a broken wooden disc made of spruce or larch, dated to c. 1000, at a Norse site near Uunartoq fjord in the Eastern Settlement of Greenland. The disc had markings similar to a gnomon curve. A triangular piece of soapstone found at Vatnahverfi in the Eastern Settlement also had such markings. It is possible that the hole in its centre could have held a gnomon, and that this object might also have been a sun compass. In 1984, several successful tests using a sun compass resembling the wooden one found at Uunartoq were made aboard Saga Siglar, a modern reconstruction of one of the Skuldelev ships, that was sailed across the North Atlantic.

== Crew ==
The Gulating Law (Gulatingslova) of Norway, passed down orally until about 1100, contained a number of rules regarding the duties of a warship's steersman (styrimaðr), who functioned as its skipper. The styrimaðr was appointed by the king and bore responsibility for the ship before, during and after a voyage. If the ship was yet to be built he supervised its construction. When the king summoned the leidang to war, the styrimaðr chose the crew for his ship. He was responsible for its navigation on voyages, while the leiðsögumaðr was the crew member who actually plotted the ship's course.

Rowing positions on longships were assigned so that each man had a designated place. The position of a rower on a ship, known as an "oar bench", was called a sess. Aft was the lypting, a raised half deck, where the helmsman and the commander stood. Forward of this was the fyrirrum (foreroom) where a chest, "the high-seat chest" (hásætis-kista), held the crew's weapons and was also used to store treasure. Next was a bailing station called the austr-rúm and then the long amidships section, the krappa-rúm, where the oarsmen manned the oars and managed the sails, and where they lived on a voyage. The forepart of the ship also had its bailing station between the krappa-rúm and the raised half deck, the stafn, in the bow. Some ships had a space at the bow called the rausn (forecastle) where the stafnbuar (lookout man) and the merkis-maðr (standard bearer) were stationed. Crumlin-Pedersen says that when rowing, the crew of the Oseberg ship for example sat on moveable chests which were used to stow the warriors' personal belongings. Equipment could also be stored in their skin sleeping bags in the daytime and when boarding the ship or going ashore.

Cook duty on voyages was assigned by the cast of lots among the men who lived in a fylki, i.e. ship district, or county, who had thralls to carry on the work at their farmsteads. The cook was paid the same wages as the sailors, who received one øre per month.

== Construction ==
Aina Margrethe Heen-Pettersen, a specialist in Viking Age archaeology, says a substantial social and economic investment was demanded to build and outfit a ship for expeditions. Estimates derived from experimental archaeology show that building a 30-metre (98 ft) longship may have required the labour of 100 persons for a year, counting that necessary to produce the needed ropes, sails, and iron. Assuming 12-hour working days, as many as 40,000 work hours would be expended. Equipping, crewing, and feeding a fleet also needed considerable resources.

A master shipwright called the "hofudsmidir" (hǫfuðsmiðr) was in charge of the construction of large ships. It was his responsibility to ensure that all required materials were available at the shipyard or worksite and that the craftsmen were fed and paid for their labour. McGrail says building the ships required a large number of workers, with various skills and levels of expertise. Long Serpent (Ormr inn langi) was built for Olaf Tryggvason at Trondheim in 998 or 999 by a team with these job descriptions: labourers, tree fellers, general carpenters or plank-cutters ("filungar"), and stem-and-stern wrights or "stafnasmidir" (stafnasmiðr). who were paid twice the wages of plank cutters. The stafnasmidir shaped the keel and carved the stems. which were sometimes carved artistically, while the filungr used axes and adzes to cleave the planks. In one scene of the Bayeux tapestry a man, almost certainly a stafnasmidir, is depicted standing in front of the stem of a boat, inspecting the workmanship and checking that its lines are fair.

=== Characteristics ===
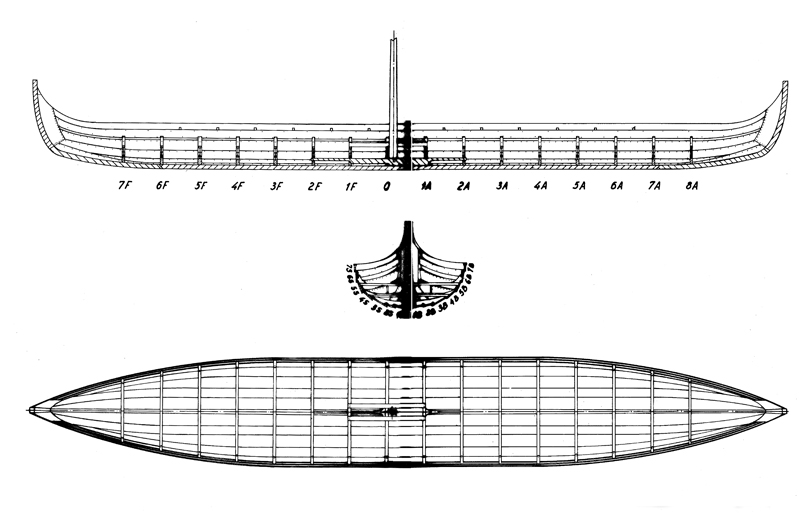
Schematic drawing of a longship construction representing the Sebbe Als ship. It is a reconstructed snekke from Denmark.

The longships were characterized as graceful, long, narrow, and light, with a shallow-draft hull designed for speed. The ship's shallow draft allowed navigation in waters only one metre deep and permitted arbitrary beach landings, while its light weight enabled it to be carried over portages or used bottom-up for shelter in camps. Longships were fitted with oars along almost the entire length of the hull. Later versions had a rectangular sail on a single mast, which was used to replace or augment the effort of the rowers, particularly during long journeys. The average speed of Viking ships varied from ship to ship, but lay in the range of 5–10 knots (9–19 km/h) and the maximum speed of a longship under favorable conditions was around 15 knots (28 km/h). The Viking Ship Museum in Oslo houses the remains of three such ships, the Oseberg, the Gokstad and the Tune ship.

Ole Crumlin-Pedersen writes that the Viking warship was differentiated from the merchant ship by its long continuous deck and the long line of oar ports, the deck being made of loose planks placed in grooves in the sides of the cross-beams. The fore and aft ends of the deck were raised slightly—the forward end was called the stafn-lok and the afterward was called the lypting. This was not what would be considered a deck in modern times. It was little more than a raised floor, and it offered no shelter from foul weather.

=== Timber ===
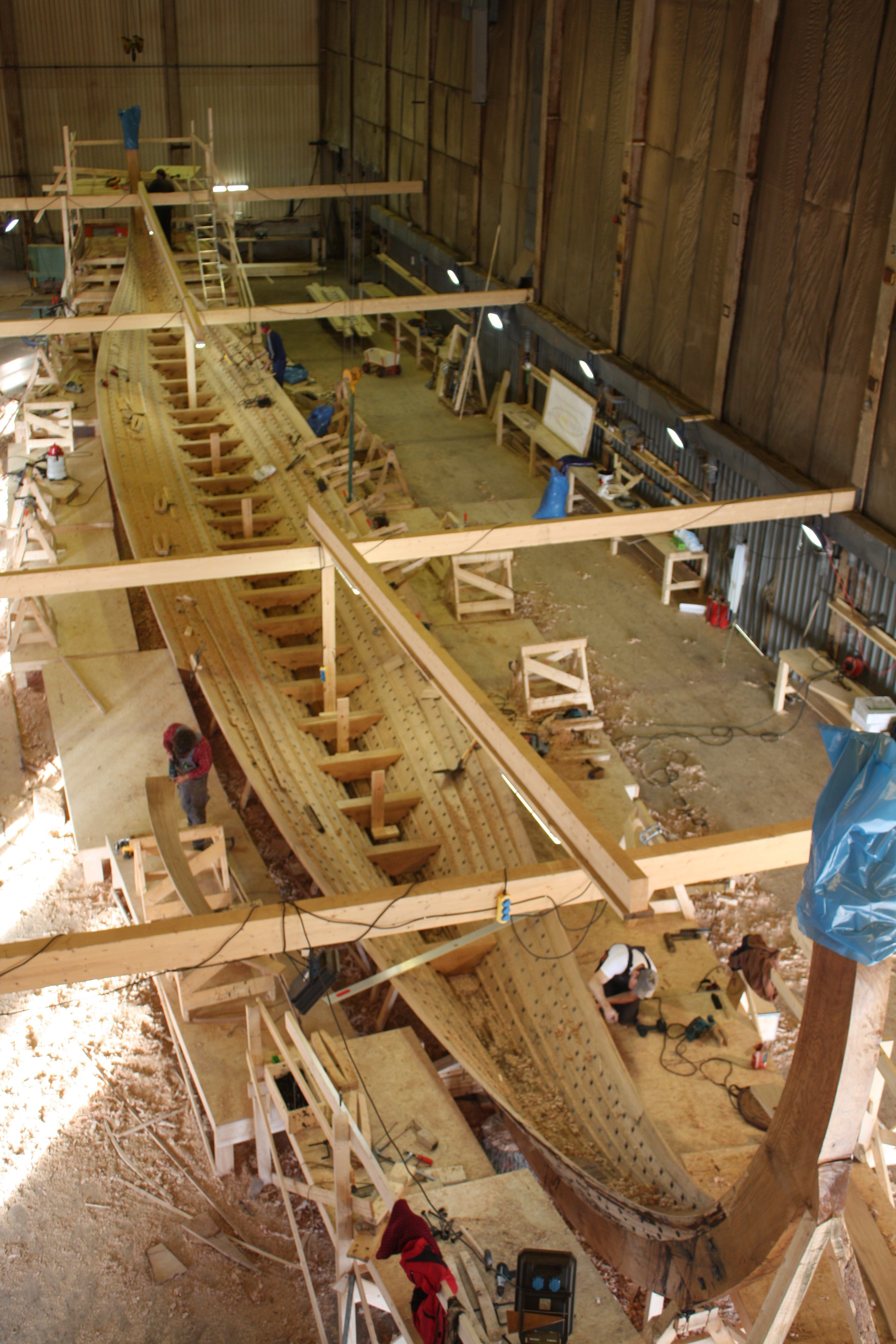
Construction of the 35 m long Skeid longship Draken Harald Hårfagre

Although analysis of timber samples from Viking longships shows that a variety of timbers were used to build them, oak was most often used because it was strong, durable, and rot resistant. Although oak is a heavy timber, it can be easily worked by adze and axe when green (unseasoned). Generally large and prestigious ships were made from oak. Morten Ravn, a curator and researcher at the Viking Ship Museum in Roskilde, says the skaldic stanzas describe which wood species were used to craft a specific type ship or ship component. Pine (Old Norse: fura) and fir (þella), maple (hlynr), ash (askr), and linden or lime (lind), are noted, but especially oak (eik). Eik and eikikjǫlr (a keel made of oak), are used in referring to well-made ships. The size of the mast, vandlangt (long-masted), is also used to define a high-status ship.

According to Angelo Forte, a maritime historian, Viking shipwrights used timber that had been recently cut, and may have immersed it in water to make it flexible enough to bend in the shape of the hull. They took advantage of the natural shapes of tree trunks, branches and roots to form those parts required for a ship's construction. These are very strong because they are aligned with the tree's fibres. Tall, straight trees were most suitable for working into masts, keels, and planking for the hull. The forestem and sternpost would be carved as single pieces from curved trunks. Forked branches were made into floor timbers, and curved ones were made into frames. The natural bend where a trunk joined a root was optimal for fashioning into knees, used as braces to stiffen the joint between two pieces of timber fastened at angles to each other. Boatbuilders chose a log with a branch that had the correct shape. Generally made from a straight piece of timber and fastened using a knee in each side of the hull, biti were the cross beams that functioned as the rower's seat. They are an essential part of the frame—a bite with its floor timber, knee and futtocks is the stiffest joinery in the boat.

Timber was worked with iron adzes and axes. Most of the smoothing was done with a side axe. Other tools used in woodwork were hammers, wedges, drawknives, and planes.

=== Sail, mast, and rigging ===
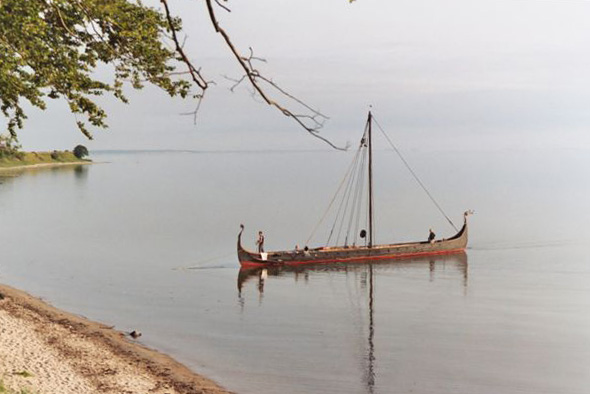
The pictured ship is the reconstructed Imme Gram.

According to the archaeologist Ole Thirup Kastholm, curator of the Roskilde Museum, sails and rigging, for the most part, are not represented in the archaeological record. These primary components of a functional sailing ship are known only by negative impressions on hulls, contemporary representations of ships, and detached objects. Kastholm writes that modern-day reconstructions of Viking Age warships are rigged with a more elevated type of square sail, based largely on the Norwegian square-rigged vessels of the 19th century. He says these contrast with the evidence of images of ships from the Viking Age on rune stones, graffiti, picture stones, and coins that depict warships equipped with low, square sails significantly wider than their height. Sails and rigging have, therefore, been reconstructed on the basis of ethnographic evidence, rather than evidence from the archaeological record revealed in maritime archaeological finds. In his view, data gathered from prehistoric remains should take precedence over the hypotheses of ethnography and experiments derived from them.

The historian F. Donald Logan says the sail of the Gokstad ship was rectangular in shape or nearly a square of possibly 11 metres (36 ft), and that it was made of rough wool cloth (vaðmál), probably striped or checked, and hung from a yard. Lines were attached from the bottom of the sail to points along the gunwale, allowing the ship to reach (sail across the wind) and to tack (sail towards the wind). Logan says that the mast of Gokstad ship, for example, has not survived in its original state, thus its height and the height to which the sail was raised are not certain. However long the mast was, apparently between 10 and 13 metres (33 and 43 ft), it was set into the keelson, a heavy wooden housing on the keel amidship, from which it could be removed as necessary.

Lise Bender Jørgensen, an archaeologist, writes that because Viking ship sails were made of wool, large amounts of it would have been necessary for their production, as demonstrated by experimental archaeology. With the introduction of sails in Scandinavia around 700, there would have been a great increase in demand for wool sailcloth and the labour of women to produce it. The researchers that Jørgensen cites say 100 square metres (120 yd^{2}) of sailcloth, 100 kilometres (62 mi) warp yarns and 80 kilometres (50 mi) weft had to be spun and woven into 15–16 lengths of cloth before the sailmakers could begin their work.

The nautical archaeologists Cooke et al describe how, with the aim of reconstructing sails to rig replicas of four of the Skuldeleve ships from Roskilde Fjord, the Viking Ship Museum initiated research in the archaeological record and in the literature to define its specifications for weaving the fabric. Because woollen square-sails had been used until the 20th century in Scandinavia and in the Faroe Islands, a good deal of practical information about making them was still available, and a few sailmakers who worked in wool were still alive. The museum began its research into woollen sails in 1977, and in the years afterwards several reconstructions of Viking Age ships were outfitted with wool sails. According to the museum, it appears that three types of weave were used to produce wool sail cloth in Viking times, depending on the available resources and the local traditions of the area where it was made. The museum decided to use 2/1 twill (tuskept) for the weaving of the wool sail for its reconstructed ships, basing this decision on the only available archaeological material, fragments of heavy woollen sailcloth dated to the mid-13th century found at Trondenes church in Norway.

According to the mariner and archaeologist Seán McGrail, masts have only rarely been found in excavations, and these are the lower parts of them. Little evidence of the standing rigging needed to support a ship's mast has survived to modern times, other than that found in iconography, and the slight evidence that does exist comes mostly from the Norse tradition. Depictions on sources such as the Bayeux tapestry indicate that the masts of ninth- to 12th-century vessels were braced by a forestay to the bowstem or a forward beam and shrouds to the top strakes or to an accessible crossbeam. The halyard may have served also as a backstay to support the mast from an after thwart or beam.

Willow withies, or osiers, were also required for attaching rigging to the hull and securing the rudder to its frame. MacGrail says the consensus among modern scholars is that cordage in Early Medieval times was made from the bast of linden trees or possibly from hemp. In situations where extra strength was needed, ropes were made from seal, whale, or walrus hides cut spirally. McGrail says the whale skin and seal skin ropes described by Ohthere to King Alfred were 60 ells, or 15 fathoms long. Jørgensen says ropes made of walrus hides were renowned for their strength. Pine tar was used to preserve organic materials such as the wood of boats, ropes, sails and fishnets.

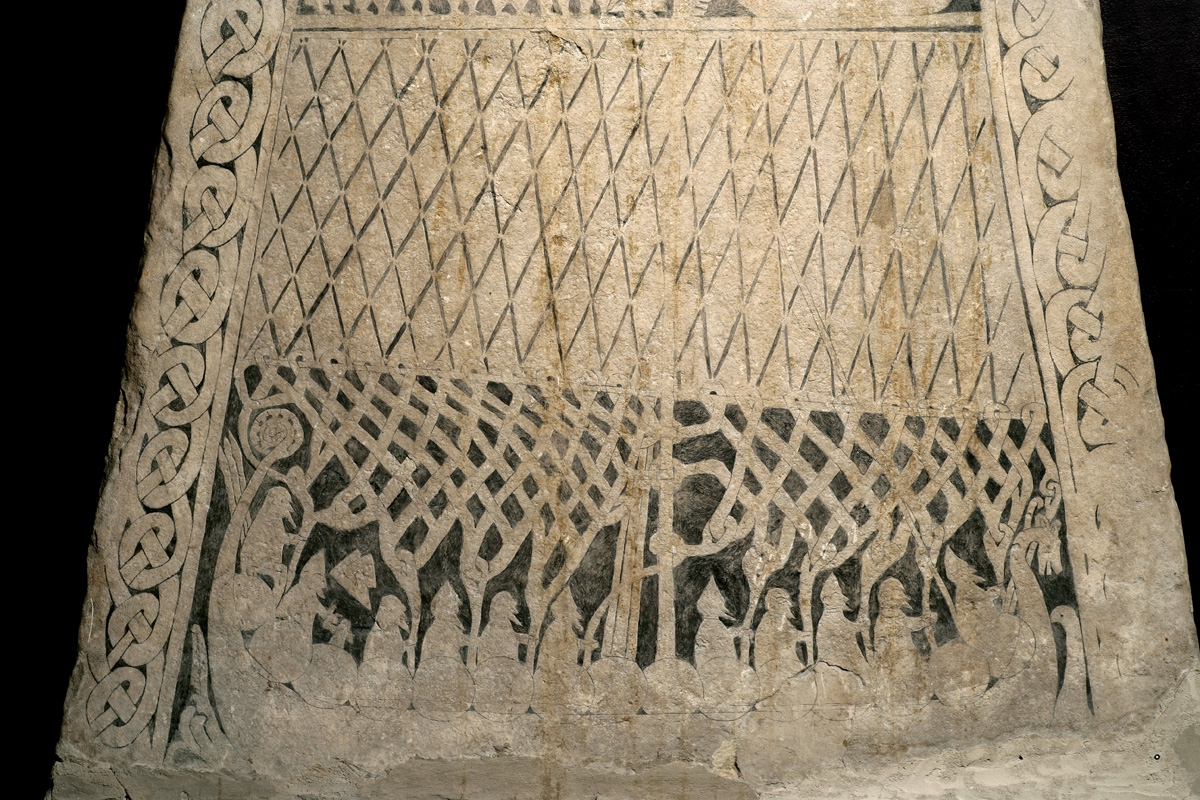
Smiss I picture stone, showing the rigging of a longship

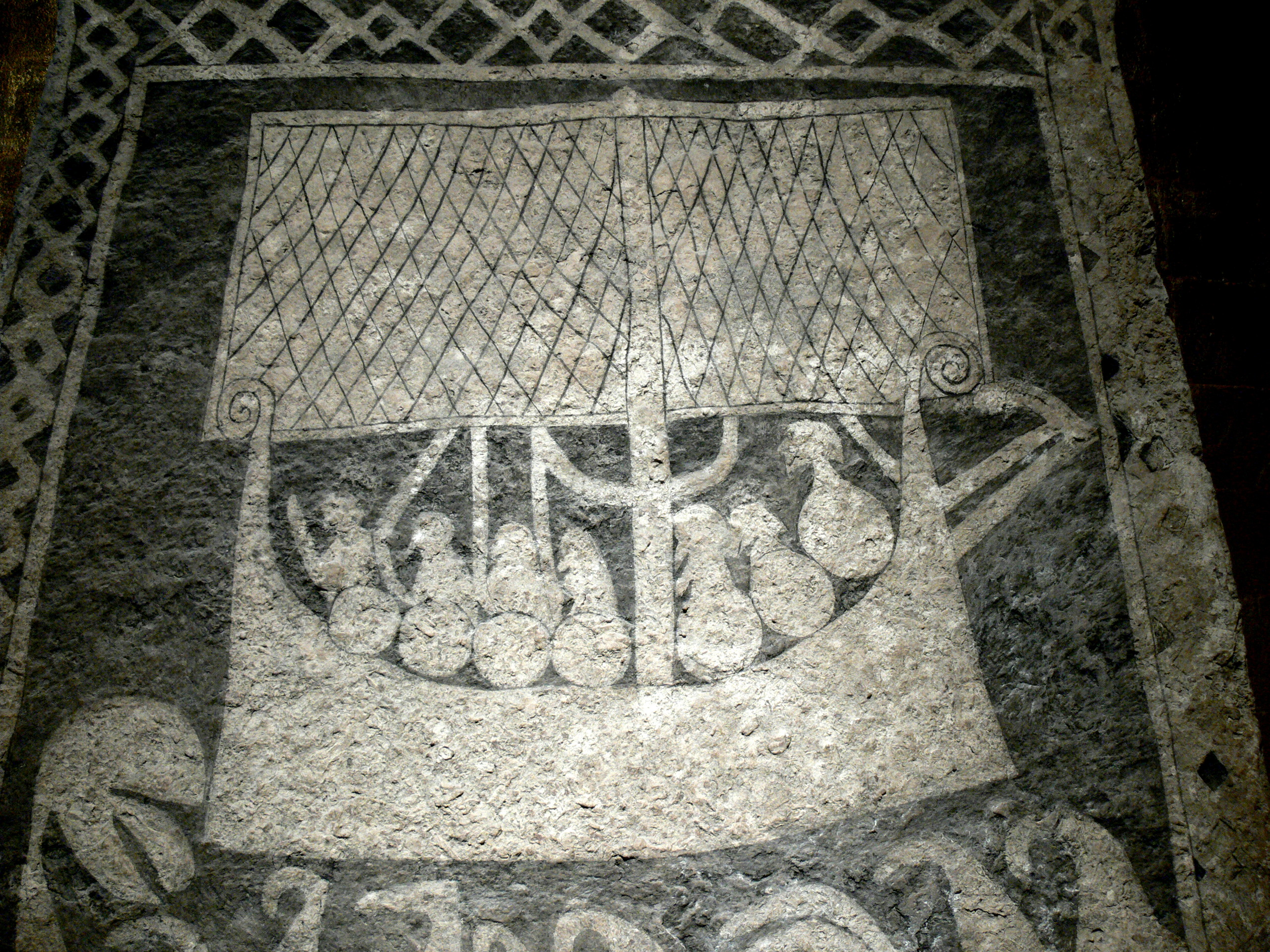
Hunninge Image Stone, showing the rigging of a longship

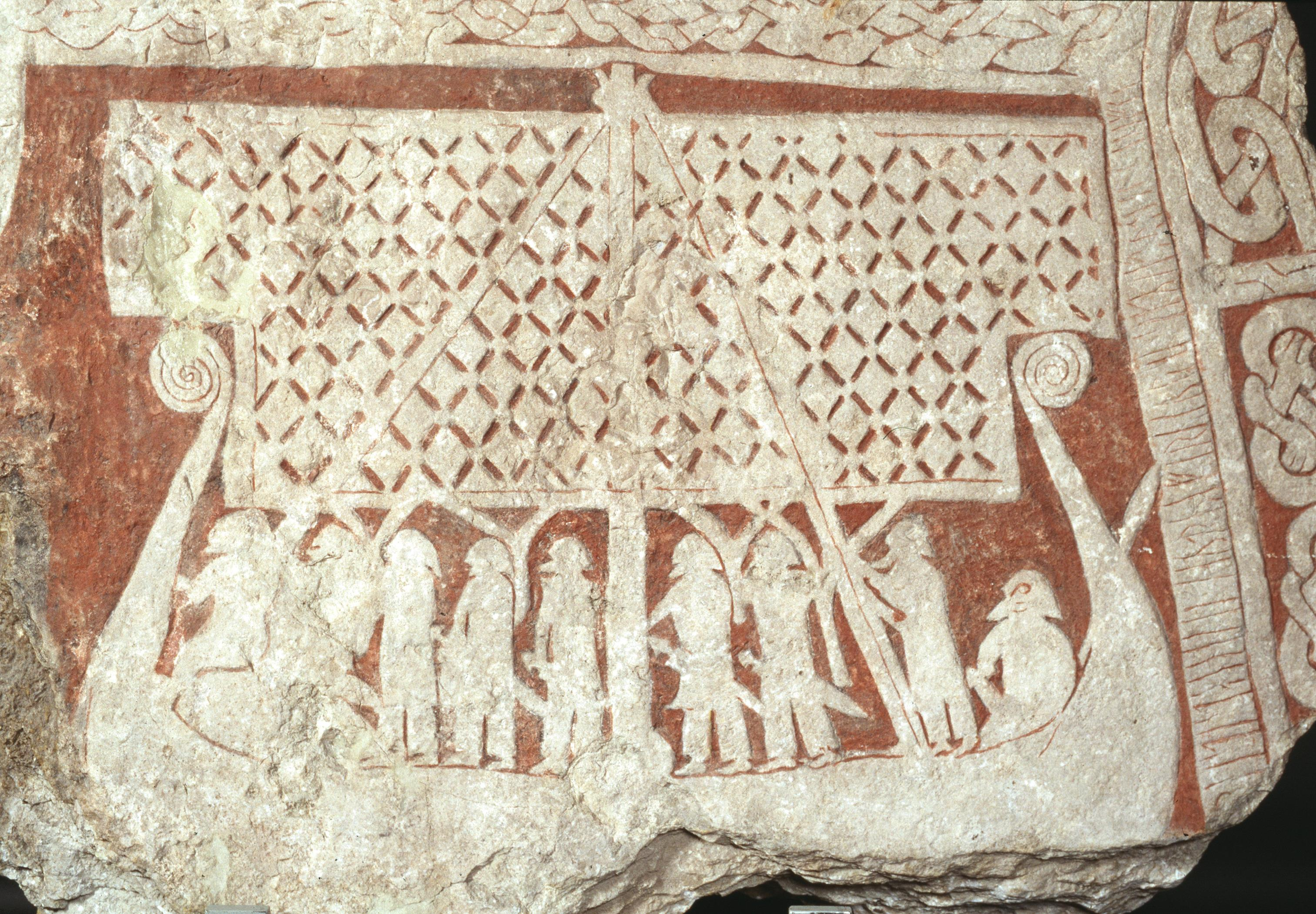
Tjängvide image stone, showing the rigging of a longship

=== Rudder ===
Viking ships were steered by a long rudder (stýri) fastened to a cylindrical piece of oak wood that according to the Viking Ship Museum in Roskilde was called a rorvort. It was mounted on the outside of the hull on the starboard (steer-board, from Old Norse styrbord) quarter of the vessel. The rudder on the Gokstad ship was 3.3 metres (11 ft) long. Nicolaysen, the excavator of the Gokstad ship, gives the Old Icelandic terms for the rudder and its different parts mentioned in the Icelandic sagas. He says the rudder (stýri) on Scandinavian vessels had since ancient times a fixed position forward of the sternpost, on the right side of the vessel, thus the name "starboard" (stjórnborði), while the opposite side to the left of the helmsman, was called the bakborði. The helmsman had behind him an upright wooden bulkhead (hǫfða-fjǫl) made from a forked piece of oak standing across the beam.

The helm consisted of a plank in the shape of a broad oar, the lower portion of which (stjórnarblað) as may be seen in the Tune ship's's rudder. This had a round hole in the middle to allow it to be fastened to the side of the vessel by a loop of rope called the stýrihamla. The tiller (stýrisdrengr) stýrisstöng (rudder-post), hjalmunvǫlr (lit. helm-pin) was stuck in a square hole in the upper part of the neck. The rudder was mounted with iron, to which one or more cramps were added down near the heel of the rudder. When the rudder was set in position up and down, a bit aslant so that its blade was almost parallel with the gunwale, it was said to leggja styri i lag (steady the helm), while the opposite action was termed to leggja styri or lag, which meant to raise the helm. This was done in shallow water when the rudder might strike the bottom, with the helmsman laying off the helm and the crew steering with the oars.

The Norwegian newspaperman and seafarer, Captain Magnus Andersen, considered the rudder of a Viking ship "greatly preferable to a stern rudder", based on his experience sailing a replica of the Gokstad ship across the Atlantic in 1893.

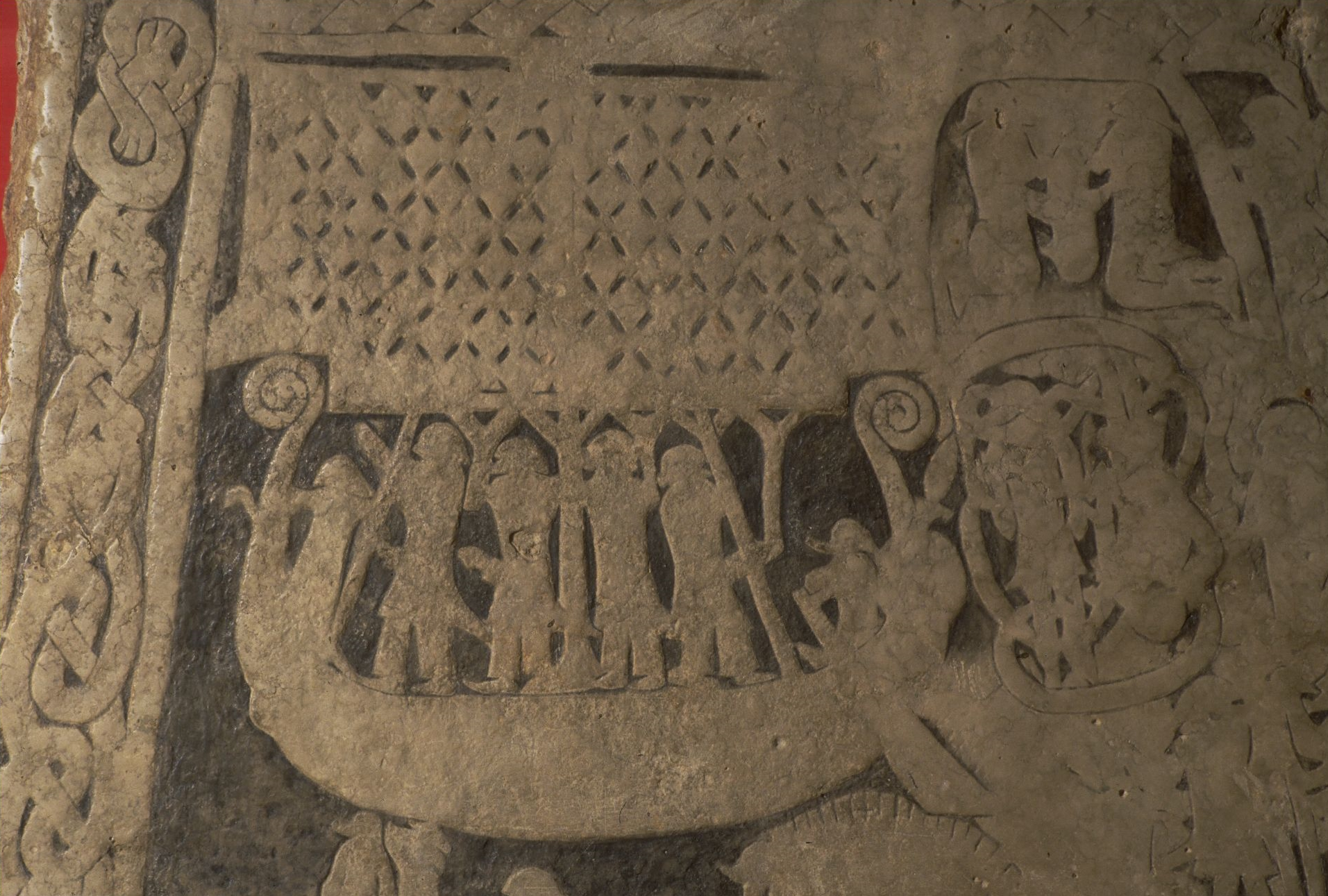
Ardre VIII picture stone, showing a longship with rudder

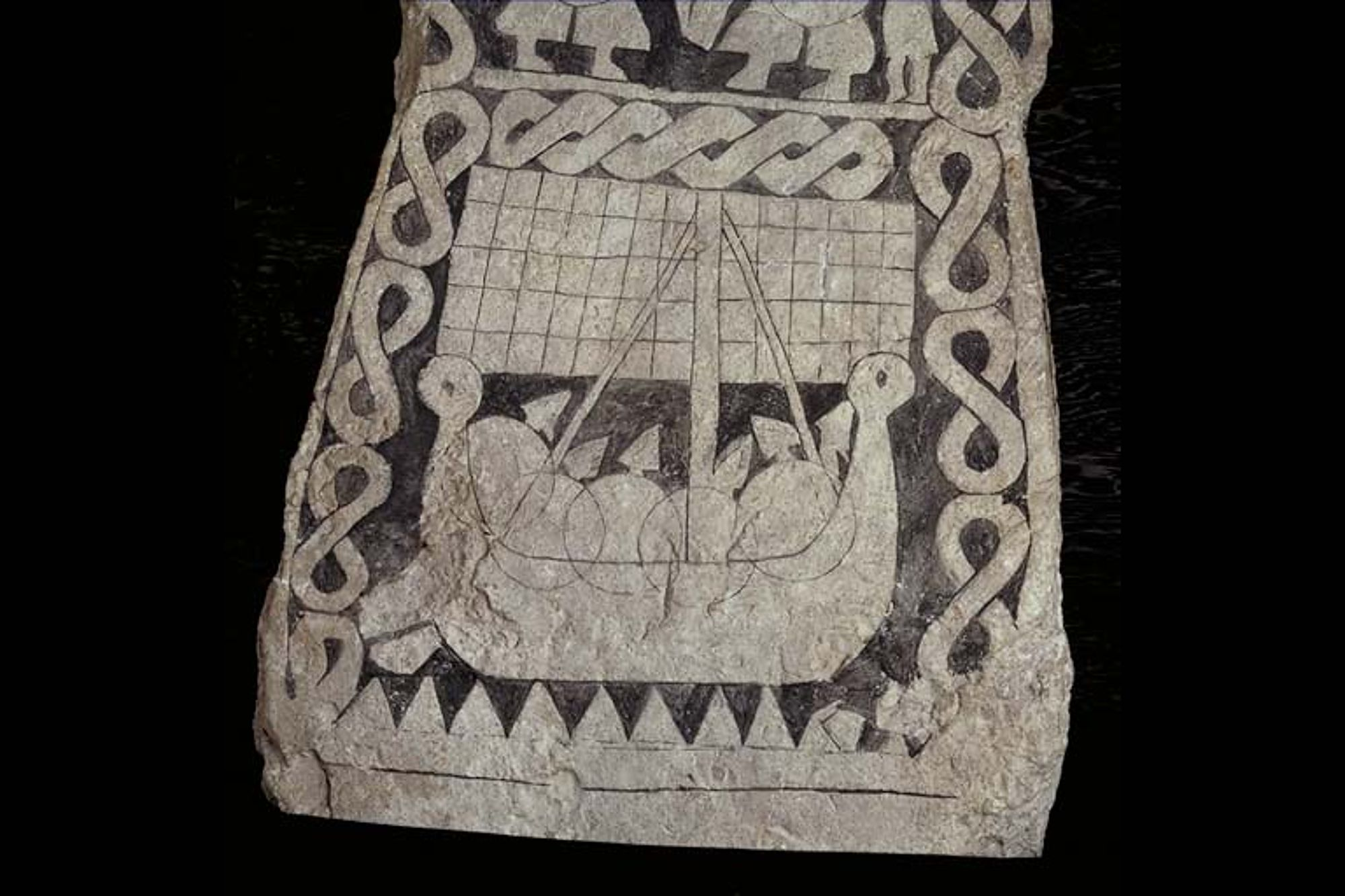
GP 280 När Smiss I picture stone, showing a longship with rudder

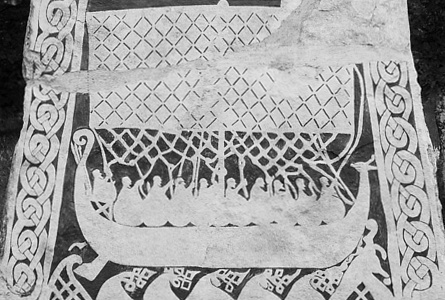
Stora Hammars I picture stone, showing a longship with rudder

=== Anchors ===
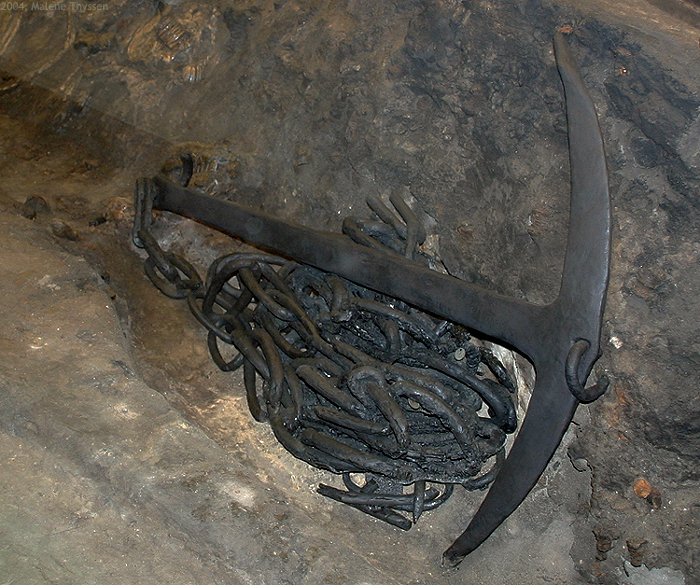
Anchor from the Ladby ship. The construction of this anchor—made of Norwegian iron— has several advantages when anchored in deep waters or in rough seas.

The anchor and its cable were essential parts of a ship's equipment. As described by Crumlin-Pedersen, anchors could be made of wood weighted with stone (stjóri) or of iron with a wooden stock (akkeri). The anchor from the ship-grave at Ladby on the island of Funen in Denmark was found well preserved in the bow of the ship. It is 1.26 metres (4 ft 2 in) long and 0.83 metres (2 ft 9 in) wide and attached to a chain which is estimated to originally have been ca. 11 metres (36 ft) long. It was shaped like a modern-day anchor but had smaller flukes. The anchor weighed only 40 to 50 kilograms (88 to 110 lb), but the length of iron linked chain attached between it and the anchor line provided a spring that helped damp out the snatch of the rope in a swell, and prevented its being abraded on the stones of the seafloor.

The archaeologist and historian Haakon Shetelig describes how the Gokstad grave-ship's anchor, which had been placed on the deck-boards forward of the mast for the burial, was so rusted when excavated that it disintegrated immediately, but the oaken anchor stock was intact. It measured 2.75 metres (9 ft 0 in) long, from which he deduces that the anchor itself was 1.10 metres (3 ft 7 in) long, assuming that the proportions would have been the same as in the Oseberg ship.

=== Ship builders' tools ===
The Mästermyr chest, a jointed Viking Age tool chest made of oak and found in Gotland in Sweden, contained blacksmithing and woodworking tools. Recent research suggests that it was lost during transportation in what was possibly a lakeshore environment at the time. A farmer found the chest in 1936 while plowing a field. Many tools from the Mästermyr find are part of an exhibit at the Swedish History Museum. The wood-working tools have previously been interpreted as boat-building and fine carpentry tools, based on the fact that similar tools are used in traditional carpentry nowadays. The tools include augers, scrapers, draw knives, axes, adzes, wedges, sledge hammers, and planes, along with a rivet iron for forging ship's rivets. The Mästermyr chest may date to 950-1000. Given that most finds of Norse tool chests have occurred on the shores of lakes, Julie Lund believes that the chests were likely to have been deliberately placed in such locations for a ritual purpose, similarly to the locating of smithies in Old Norse folklore. Christer Westerdahl, a field archaeologist and ethnologist, calls the unknown owner of the chest an "itinerant boatbuilder and smith" who may have lost or sacrificed his complete toolkit.

Writing on the process of the working of wood in the period when Viking ships were built, Forte describes the contents of a 13th-century Norwegian treatise, Konungs skuggsjá, which lists the tools used by shipwrights of the time. These include broadaxes, augers, and gouges, but no saws. He notes that the Bayeaux Tapestry contains a scene that shows the construction of a ship from the felling of trees for its timber to its fitting out. The scene depicts men using axes to fell trees, cut branches, and cleave planking for the hull. An axe with a longer blade and a shorter handle is shown being used to shape the planking. Adzes, a router plane, and a bore are also shown, but again no saw is in evidence. Some of the planks of the Skuldelev vessels had distinct axe cuts, and possibly adze cuts as well. The smooth cutting marks and occasional gouges left by planes are visible in the wood worked during the ships' construction. The marks left by routers, drawknives, and scrapers are apparent. Drilled holes are also to be seen.

Seán McGrail writes that woodworking tools excavated in a number of Viking Age burials demonstrate that Viking shipwrights used a wide variety of handtools. He says inspection of these tools, of toolmarks found on the wooden remains of Viking boats, and of boatbuilding scenes portrayed by artists of the early Middle Ages, such as on the Bayeux Tapestry, indicate that the premier Viking Age shipbuilder's tool was the axe. The craftsmen who used the tools were so skilled that they commonly performed the final dressing of oak planks with axes. The planks of the ships in the Skuldelev finds were finished with a drawknife, and adzes apparently were used to shape some curved surfaces. Hammers and mallets, knives, gouges, wedges, and chisels were often employed, while holes were bored with a bit inserted in a T-shaped handle.

== Legacy ==
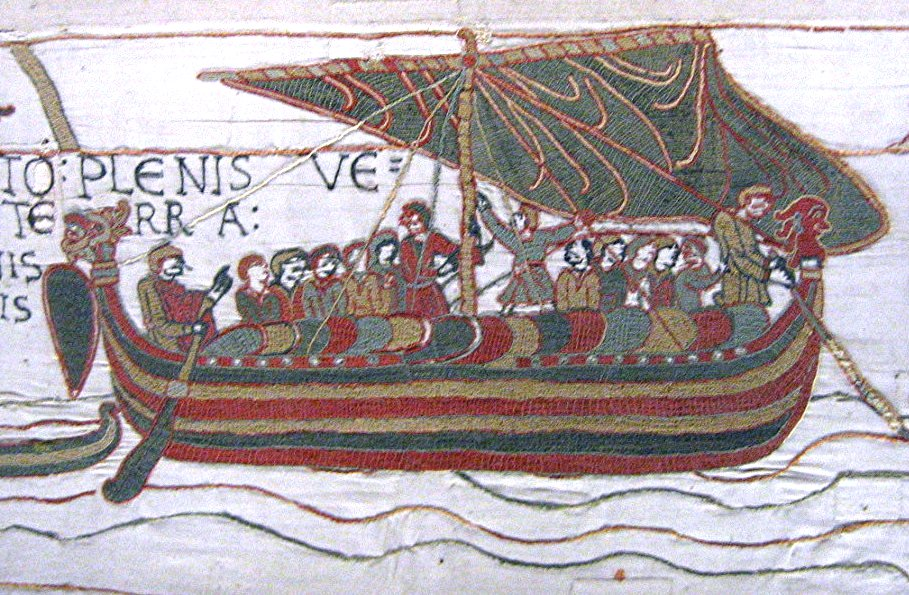
Image from the Bayeux Tapestry showing Harold Godwinson's ship approaching a beach, probably in the Somme Estuary

The archaeologist Dagfinn Skre writes that Viking warriors, who used their ships to reach Northern European coasts where they raided settlements and monasteries, had inherited a long tradition of expertise in naval warfare that evolved over three thousand years. Their light and swift ships were eminently suited to storming these locations and making off before counter attacks could be mounted. These ships were the basis of warrior identity and their battle tactics, while the sea provided a theatre of operations where they attained power and prestige. Thus they developed matchless seamanship, naval warfare, and shipbuilding skills. According to the historian Régis Boyer, an argument can be made that the Vikings provoked the West into an awareness of itself as a global entity, forcing it to set up a common defence and to reorganize itself politically with stronger centralized powers. He says, "[T]hey possessed a ferment of activity and dynamism that lay dormant in the south. They came at just the right moment to breathe new life into the (Indo-)European personality."

Historians, archaeologists and adventurers have reconstructed longships in an attempt to understand how they worked. The longship was light, fast, and nimble. The true Viking warships, or langskips, were long and narrow, frequently with a length to beam (width) ratio of 7:1; they were very fast under sail or propelled by warriors who served as oarsmen. The overall length to beam (width) ratio of the excavated Viking longships Skuldelev 5 and the Ladby ship was 7:1, and that of Skuldelev 2 was 8.3:1.

In Scandinavia, the longship was the usual vessel for war until the 12th–13th centuries. Leiðangr fleet-levy laws remained in place for most of the Middle Ages in Norway, where the active participation of the leiðangr was still strategically necessary —their military obligations had not been fully replaced by systems of taxation as they had been in Sweden and Denmark. These laws required that when summoned by the Crown, the freemen peasantry should build, man, and furnish ships for war—ships with at least 20 or 25 pairs of oars (40 or 50 rowers). By the late 14th century, these low-boarded vessels were at a disadvantage against newer, taller warships. When the Victual Brothers, in the employ of the Hansa, attacked Bergen in late 1393, the "great ships" of the pirates could not be boarded by the Norwegian levy ships called out by Margaret I of Denmark, and the raiders were able to sack the town with impunity. While earlier times had seen larger and taller longships in service, by this time the authorities had also gone over to other types of ships for warfare. The last known mobilization of the leiðangr occurred in 1429, when the Victual Brothers defeated the naval levies of the Norwegian western counties (fylker) outside Bergen.

== Notable longships ==
=== Preserved originals ===
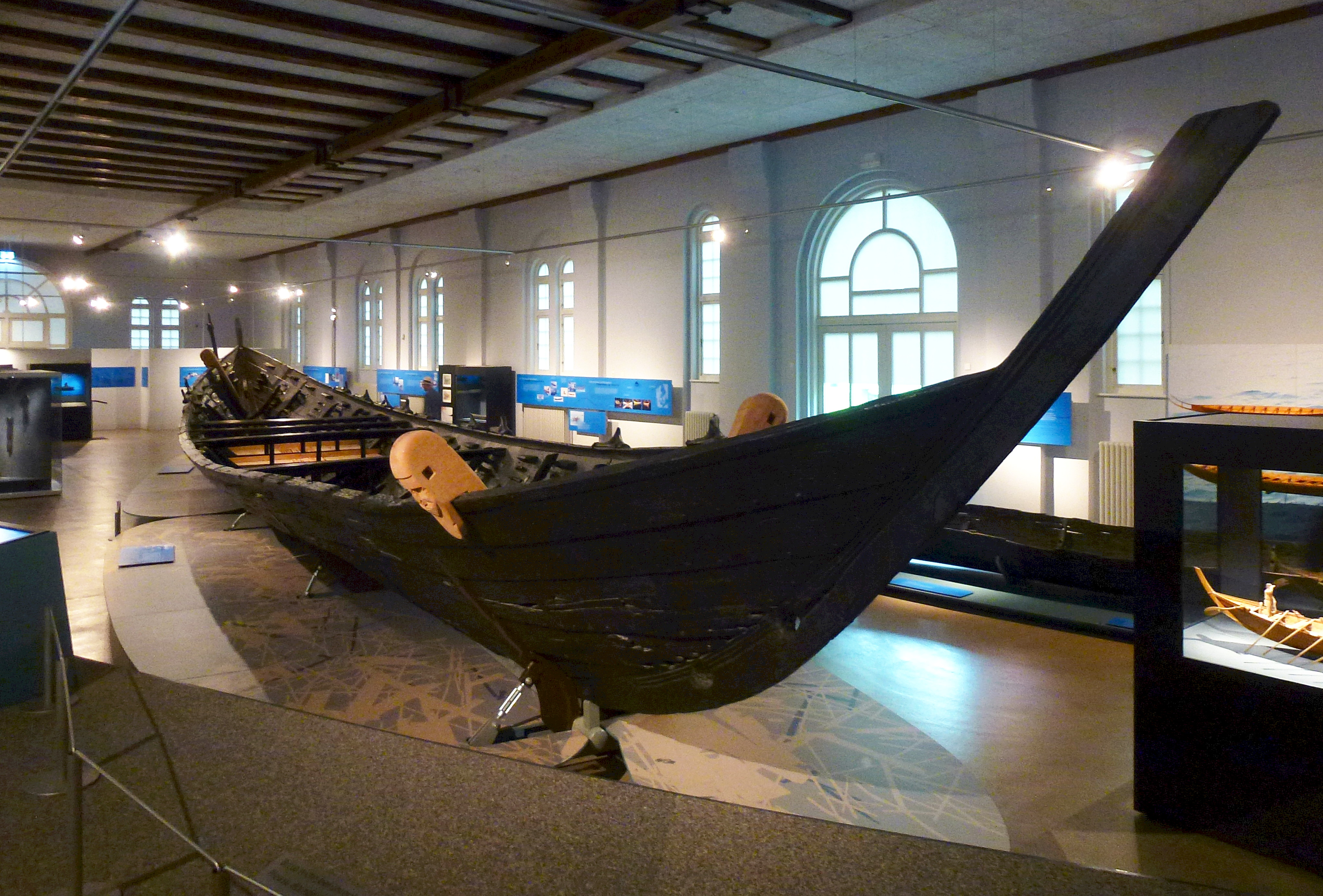
The Nydam ship in Germany

Several of the original longships built in the Viking Age have been excavated by archaeologists. The following is a list of vessels that have been important to knowledge of longship design and construction:

- The Nydam ship (c. 310–320 AD) is a burial ship from Denmark. This oaken vessel is 24 m (80 feet) long and was propelled by oars only. No mast is attached, as it was a later addition to the longship design. The Nydam ship shows a combination of building styles and is important to understanding of the evolution of the early Viking ships.
- "Puck 2" is the name given to a longship found in the Bay of Gdansk in Poland in 1977. It has been dated to the first half of the 10th century and was 19 to 20 metres (62 to 66 ft) long in its day. It is peculiar and important because it was constructed by Western Slavic craftsmen, not Scandinavian. The design differs only slightly from that of the Scandinavian-built longships. Instead of iron rivets as in Norse vessels, small wooden treenails were used to fasten the planks, and they were caulked with moss, rather than tarred wool and animal hair.
- Hedeby 1 is the name given to a longship found in the harbour of Hedeby in 1953. At nearly 31 metres (102 ft) long, it is of the Skeid type, built around 985 AD. With a maximum width of just 2.7 metres (8.9 ft) it has a width-to-length ratio of more than 11, making it the slimmest longship ever discovered. It is made of oaken wood and its construction would have required a very high level of craftsmanship.
- The Oseberg ship and the Gokstad ship – both from Vestfold in Norway. They both represent the longship design of the later Viking Age.
- Roskilde 6 is the name given to the longest longship ever found at approximately 37.4 metres (123 ft). It was discovered in 1996–97 at the Viking Ship Museum in Roskilde, Denmark. The ship was constructed around 1025.
- The Gjellestad ship, built in Norway around 732, was discovered in 2018. Excavations were completed in December 2022, and the remains of the keel are undergoing preservation.

=== Historical examples ===
Important longships known only from written sources include:

- The Ormr inn langi ("The Long Serpent") was the most famous longship of Norwegian king Olaf Tryggvason. According to saga texts, the vessel had 34 rúm, that is, the number of spaces for the rowers between the frames, corresponding to 34 pairs of oars. It was high-sided, with its gunwales as high as those on a sea-going ship. As described in the saga text accounts of sea-battles between the great warships, attacking such ships is difficult because of their height.
- The Mora was the longship given to William the Conqueror by his wife, Matilda, and used as the flagship in the Norman conquest of England.
- The Mariasuda (Maríusúð), the large flagship of Norwegian king Sverre at the Battle of Fimreite, had 33 rúm after its length was extended by 12 ells (alin) at the command of the king, who was dissatisfied with its size. Sverris saga describes the construction of the ship and is critical of its appearance after the extension. The historian Rudolf Simek, a specialist in Nordic studies, says that the ship had been lengthened against the advice of his shipbuilders and "it was a rotten ship altogether, both ugly to look at and hardly seaworthy, although it was huge." It was significantly taller than any other ship in the battle and carried between 280 and 320 men. The ship was later burned in Bergen by king Sverre's enemies.

=== Replicas ===
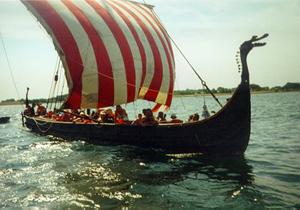
Replica of the Ladby ship, "Imme Gram"

Crumlin-Pedersen says that experimental ship archaeology can provide a methodology to gain insight studying the remains of ancient ships in context of the past—their construction, use, and maintenance being reflections of its maritime aspects. Sometimes, however, a research-driven approach to such projects is subordinated to other, opposing goals. A number of full-scale replicas of several ships of the past have been built in various places, their builders claiming to make important contributions to a modern understanding of the practice of navigation in the past. He says that sometimes "the use of the terms 'experimental' and 'replica' is just a cover-up for raising money for a project whose aims have little relevance to scholarly study."

Even in those instances where archaeological, iconographic or textual evidence is available for the replica builder to consult, there are frequently large gaps in the original sources on the nature of the equipment and rigging of ancient ships, and even of important hull components. A lack of research, poor construction techniques, and inept seamanship on the part of the crew because of inadequate experience, may lead to false conclusions about the characteristics and seaworthiness of the ancient vessels. The naval historian Alan Binns says even modern-day replica Viking ships that are accurate reproductions of the originals must be treated cautiously as historical evidence for a ship's capabilities, as they are usually sailed by professional sailors with modern backup, and are not representative of the actual ships that sailed in the Viking Age.

According to Anton Englert, an archaeologist and curator of the Viking Ship Museum, most of the trial voyages of reconstructed ancient ships have been performed by amateurs who wanted to prove a certain hypothesis by re-enacting a voyage. He says it is arguable whether or not such hypotheses have contributed to experimental archaeology. Only a few projects were built on substantial archaeological evidence, as with the construction of Viking and Saga Siglar. Forte writes: "The fact that a reconstruction of the Gokstad ship successfully crossed the Atlantic should not be interpreted as indicating that this was the type of vessel that travelled the North Atlantic runs to Iceland and Greenland a thousand years ago." Binns says Magnus Andersen's replica of the Gokstad ship, with its deeper keel, buoyancy fender, continuous deck, and anachronistic rig (including staysails), cannot reasonably be considered evidence for the sailing characteristics of the original.

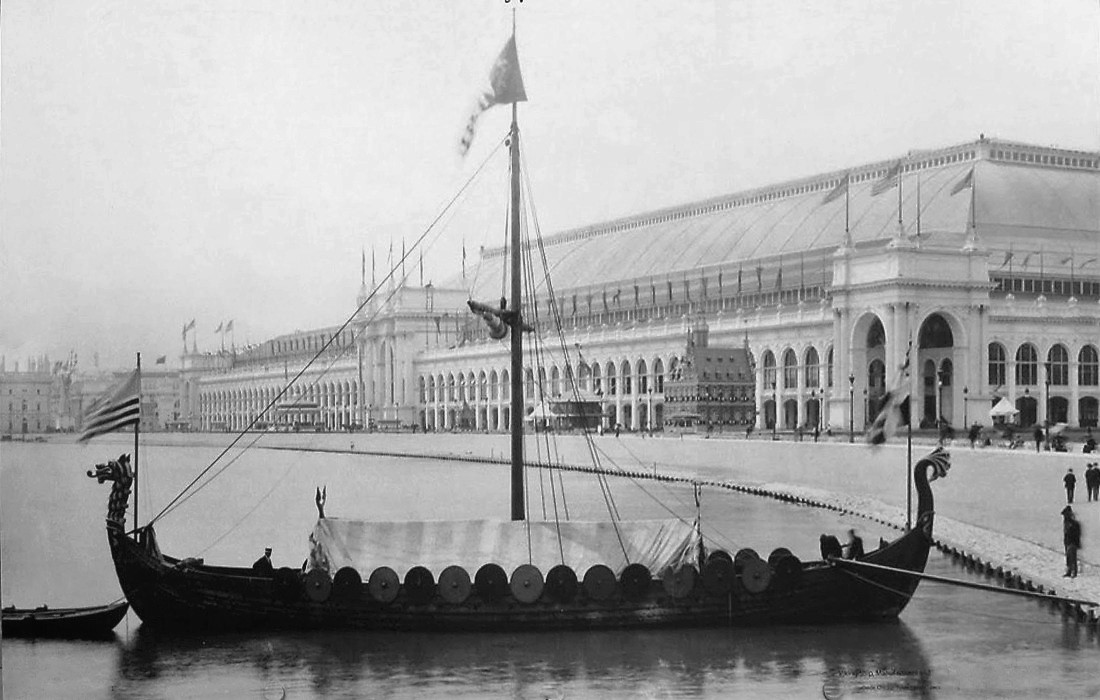
A replica of the Gokstad ship, named Viking, sailed across the Atlantic to the World's Columbian Exposition in 1893.

- Viking In 1893 Captain Magnus Andersen and a crew of 11 men sailed a reconstruction of the Gokstad ship, called Viking, from Bergen, Norway across the north Atlantic to Newfoundland and on to New York City, and then to the World's Columbian Exposition in Chicago. Andersen kept a log of the voyage and noted the ship's performance in storms and heavy seas, reporting speeds greater than 10 knots. The Gokstad ship replica was commissioned by Andersen with the support of the Norwegian-American Seamen's Association and built by a Norwegian boatbuilder, Christen Christensen, at Framnæs shipyard in Sandefjord, southern Norway, near the location of the Gokstad find. The Norwegian Navy provided plans drawn from the original vessel, and the replica was constructed in five months, from September 1892 until late January 1893, built mostly of oak timber sourced in Norway. The antiquarian Nicolay Nicolaysen, who had excavated the Gokstad ship burial in 1880, opposed the project of building and sailing a replica of the ship to the world's fair, arguing that this kind of ship was never intended to be sailed across the Atlantic.
- The Skuldelev replicas. All the five Skuldelev ships have been replicated, some of them several times. They are each of a different design and only Skuldelev 1, 2 and 5 are longships.
- The Sea Stallion is a replica of the Skuldelev 2 ship, constructed by authentic methods. At 30 m (98 feet), it is the second longest Viking ship replica ever made. Skuldelev 2 was originally built near Dublin around 1042 for sailing on the rough Irish Sea, and was rediscovered in Roskilde, Denmark in 1962. The Sea Stallion sailed from Roskilde to Dublin in the summer of 2007 to commemorate the voyage of the original. In late 2007 and early 2008, the ship was exhibited outside the National Museum in Dublin. In mid-2008, it returned to Roskilde on a sea route south of England.
- The Íslendingur (Icelander) is a 22 m (72-foot) replica of the Gokstad ship that was built using traditional building techniques. In 2000, it was sailed from Iceland to L'Anse aux Meadows in Newfoundland, to participate in the 1000th anniversary of the Viking landing in North America.
- The Munin is a half-sized replica of the Gokstad ship. Berthed at the Vancouver Maritime Museum, built at the Scandinavian Community Centre, Burnaby, British Columbia and launched in 2001.

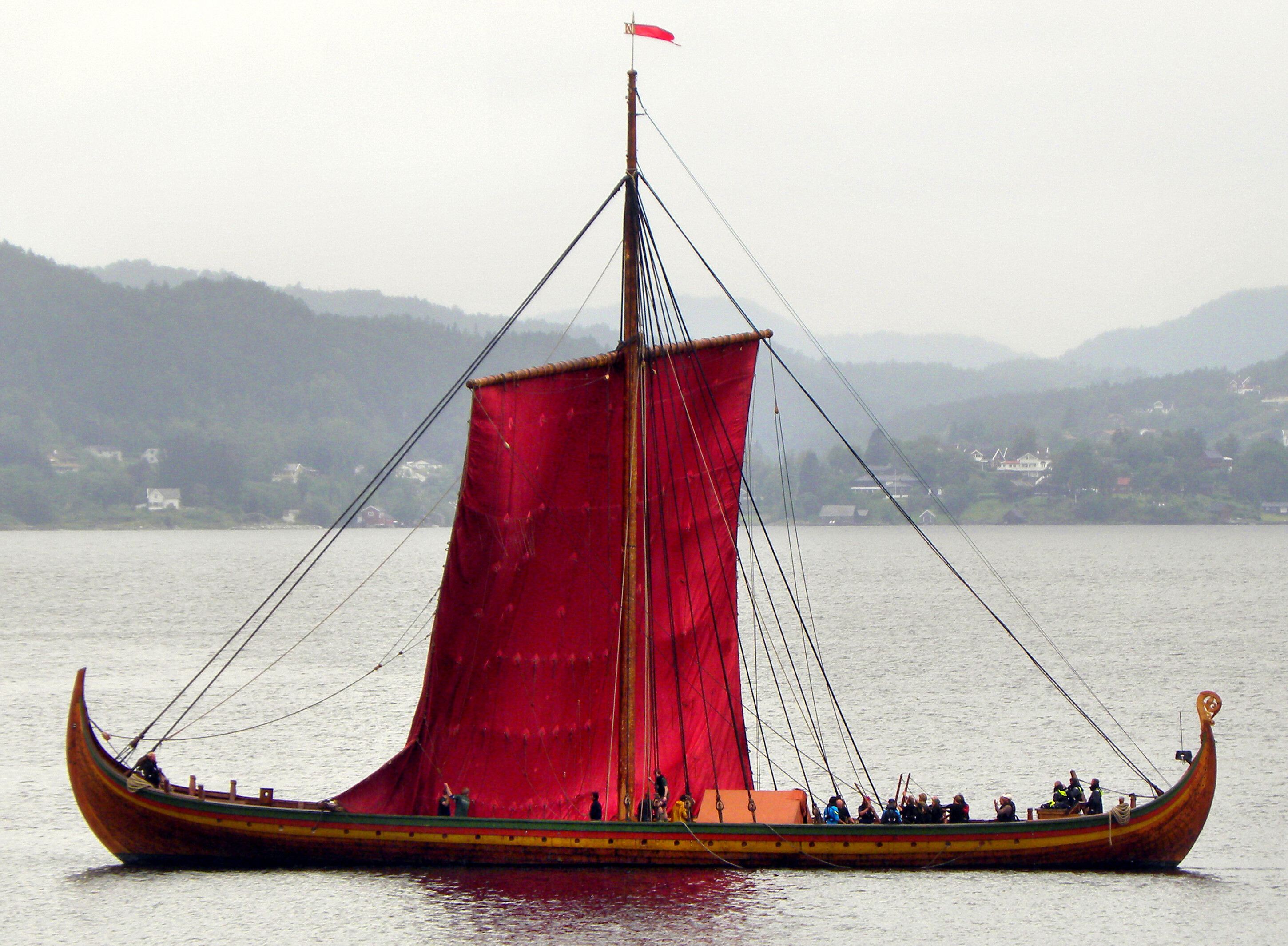
The modern longship Draken Harald Hårfagre raising its sail

- The Myklebust Ship is a 30 m (100 ft) replica of the original ship of the same name found in Nordfjordeid, Norway. The replica is in the Sagastad knowledge center, and is the largest replica based on an original find. The replica was christened in 2019, as part of the opening of Sagastad.
- Draken Harald Hårfagre is the largest longship built in modern times at 35 m (115 feet). The ship is not a replica of any original longship, since ships resembling it never existed—it was built by boatbuilders skilled in the modern Norwegian clinker-built tradition, but scaled up to dimensions not used during Viking or Medieval times. It was constructed in Haugesund, Norway and launched in 2012.

== See also ==
- Birlinn
- drakkar (disambiguation page), term used in popular contexts for Viking ship, adopted through French adaptation of modern Swedish drakar (plural for "dragon ship")
- Hugin (longship)
- Leidang
- Medieval ships
- Nordland (boat)
- Sutton Hoo ship burial
- Viking ship
