= Drakkar Sauna =

Musical duo from Lawrence, Kansas

- Origin: Lawrence, Kansas
- Genres: Country folk Freak folk
- Years active: 2003–2015
- Labels: Marriage Records; Third Man Records
- Members: Wallace Cochran; Jeff Stolz

Drakkar Sauna was a Lawrence, Kansas-based musical duo active from 2003 to 2015. Their members were Jeff Stolz and Wallace Cochran. Their music incorporated elements of country, bluegrass, and folk.

== History ==
Drakkar Sauna formed when Stolz and Cochran worked together on the soundtrack to Blood Feud, a B-movie that Cochran directed. They subsequently began collaborating on additional music after completing the soundtrack. They released their debut album, Rover, in 2004. Its music reflected such disparate influences as Mandy Patankin and the musical Guys and Dolls. It was followed by 2005's Drakkansasauna and 2006's Jabraham Lincoln. In 2008, they released War and Tornadoes, an album of nine Louvin Brothers covers. Stolz and Cochran have identified the Louvin Brothers' music as a major influence on their own vocal styles. In 2009, the band released 20009, a space travel-themed album that originated in The Moon For Its Citizens, a book that Cochran had previously written. They broke up in 2015, because Cochran was moving to Maui, Hawaii. Their final performance took place on August 7, 2015. In 2017, the band briefly reunited to release the album Very Much Cologne.

== Style ==
Critics who reviewed Drakkar Sauna's music consistently noted the duo's unusual style and subject matter. For instance, Paste described their songs as "...very idiosyncratic and complicated", and Jason Harper wrote that the duo "...have perfected a merry strangeness while singing rattly, circus-wagon folk songs about bears, spears, wolf tits and obscure historical figures such as would-have-been president-napper John Surratt". Nikki Miller-Rose described their style as "kinda country folk bluegrass and also old-timey" and as "uniquely quirky". She also referred to the duo as "They Might Be Giants meets Alison Krauss". Joshua Klein of Pitchfork wrote that Drakkar Sauna "...embrace the rich traditions of American folk, bluegrass, and country, yet do it as outsiders, sticking to the backroads and playing up the Old Weird America eccentricities with a subversive wink."

== Discography ==
=== Studio albums ===
- Rover (Marriage, 2004)
- Drakkansasauna (Marriage, 2005)
- Jabraham Lincoln (Marriage, 2006)
- Wars and Tornadoes (Marriage, 2008)
- 20009 (Marriage, 2009)
- Very Much Cologne (Bandcamp, 2017)

=== Singles ===
- Leave That Hole Alone (Third Man 7", 2010)
