= Kvalsund ship =

8th-century longship found in Norway

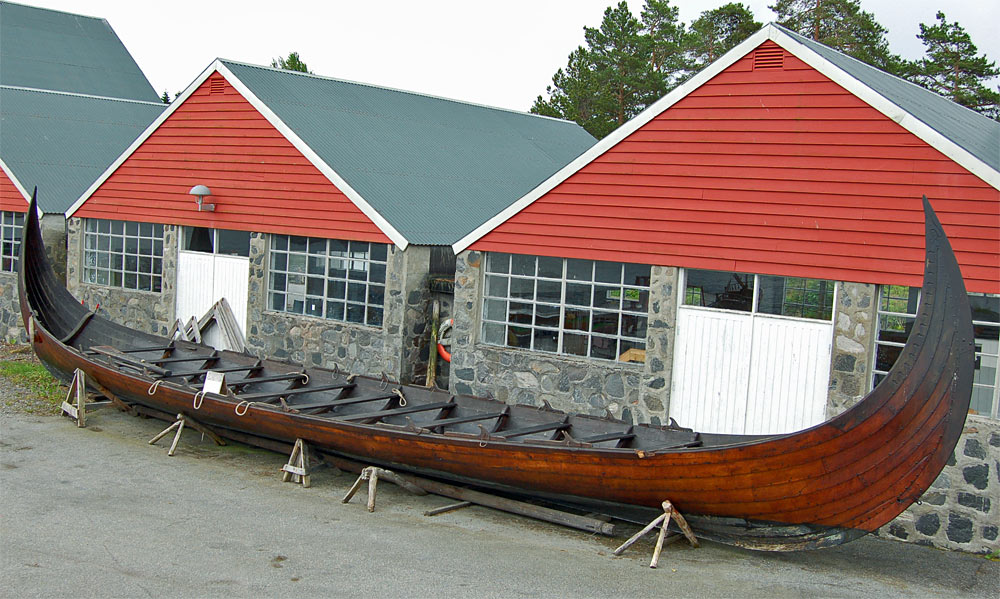
- Replica of the Kvalsund ship

History

Norway
- Name: Kvalsund Ship
- Launched: 780-800 AD
- Notes: Discovered June 1920

General characteristics
- Length: 18 m (59 ft)

The Kvalsund ship (Norwegian: Kvalsundskipet, also known as Kvalsund II) is a late 8th century rowing ship, discovered in 1920 embedded in a marsh at Kvalsund in Herøy Municipality (near Ålesund) in Norway. It was about 18 m (59 ft) long and was discovered together with a smaller, 9.5 m (31 ft) long rowboat called Kvalsund I. Detailed dendrochronology analysis has placed the construction of the Kvalsund ship at 780-800 AD (originally, it was believed to be older), which is the start of the Viking Age.

The Kvalsund ship is of an earlier and less advanced construction than the Oseberg ship, also found in Norway, which dates to the early ninth century. Being from around the start of the Viking Age and likely part of an offering in a pond or bog, the Kvalsund ship represents an important link between later Viking Age ships and earlier, pre-Viking Age vessels (like the Nydam boat) and rituals. Both the ship and the smaller rowboat that was found with it were deliberately destroyed before being placed in the pond or bog, and no human remains have been found (i.e., the offering does not appear to have been part of a burial). This resembles earlier, pre-Viking Age finds from Denmark, but is unlike typical Viking Age ship burials. The ship featured a detachable rudder on one side that could be removed in shallow water, and its shape suggests it might have had a sail. If so, it would have been of a very simple type, as it lacks some features typical of sailing ships; thus it appears to have been transitional between earlier, pre-Viking Age rowing ships and the later typical Viking ships, sharing some features with both. A mast was found at the smaller Kvalsund I boat, but it is unclear if it belongs to it. The earliest Scandinavian ship confirmed to have had a sail was the Oseberg ship.
