= Myklebust =

Myklebust may refer to:

== Places ==
- Myklebust, a farm in Nordfjordeid, Stad Municipality in Vestland county, Norway.
- Myklebust, Bremanger, a village in Bremanger Municipality in Vestland county, Norway
- Myklebust, Eigersund, a village in Eigersund Municipality in Rogaland county, Norway
- Myklebust, Harøya, a village on Harøya island in Ålesund Municipality in Møre og Romsdal county, Norway
- Myklebust, Herøy, a borough in the town of Fosnavåg in Herøy Municipality in Møre og Romsdal county, Norway
- Myklebust, Sunnfjord, a village in Sunnfjord Municipality in Vestland county, Norway
- Myklebost, Ålesund (or Myklebust), a village on Ellingsøya island in Ålesund Municipality in Møre og Romsdal county, Norway
- Myklebust Verft, a Norwegian shipyard located in Gursken in Sande Municipality, Møre og Romsdal county, Norway
- Myklebustbreen (or Myklebust Glacier), a glacier in the Nordfjord region of Vestland county, Norway

== People ==
- Agnar Mykle (1915–1994), Norwegian writer (born Agnar Myklebust)
- Anders Myklebust (born 1928), Norwegian politician
- Christian Myklebust (born 1992), Norwegian football player
- Egil Myklebust (born 1942), Norwegian businessperson and lawyer
- Einar Myklebust (born 1922), Norwegian architect and professor
- Magnus Myklebust (born 1985), Norwegian football player
- Merete Myklebust (born 1973), Norwegian former football player
- Oddmund Myklebust (1915–1972), Norwegian politician
- Ole Jørn Myklebust (born 1977), Norwegian musician
- Ragnhild Myklebust, Norwegian paralympian
- Thor Myklebust (1908–1989), Norwegian politician

== Other uses ==
- Myklebust Ship, the remains of a burned Viking ship
- Myklebust Burial Mound , a Viking age burial mound

== See also ==
- Myklebostad (disambiguation)
- Myklebost (disambiguation)
