= Myklebust farm =

Farm in Nordfjordeid

Coordinates: 61°54′36″N 5°59′27″E

Myklebust is a historic farm and former estate located in Nordfjordeid, Norway. Known historically as the oldest and largest estate (storgård) in the region, it is most notable as the site of the Myklebust burial mound and its status as a major regional power center during the Viking Age. Throughout its history, the estate has transitioned from a prehistoric chieftain's seat to a medieval noble estate, a clerical trading post, and eventually into the modern town center of Nordfjordeid.

== Etymology and geography ==
The name Myklebust is derived from the Old Norse words mikill (meaning "large" or "great") and bólstadr (meaning "farm" or "homestead"). This naming convention historically designated the largest and most significant farm in a given settlement.

At the height of its influence, the Myklebust estate was geographically massive. Situated on the north side of the valley floor, it originally encompassed the majority of the isthmus (eidet) stretching from the inner reaches of Eidsfjorden in the west and extending 2 to 3 kilometers east to Horningdalsvatnet. This immense footprint included lands that would later become the separate farms of Gjerde and Langeland.

== History ==
=== Prehistory and the Viking age ===
Myklebust functioned as a continuous center of power for centuries before the Viking era. Archaeological evidence, including multiple large burial mounds, indicates the estate was home to wealthy and powerful figures dating as far back as the Bronze Age and early Iron Age. Significant early excavations in 1847 first brought the immense historical wealth of the farm's early owners to national attention.

By the Viking Age, Myklebust was the established seat of power for the kings of the Kingdom of Firda. The farm is the location of several significant grave mounds, including Rundehogjen, where King Audbjørn of the Fjords was buried in the Myklebust Ship following the Battle of Solskjel in 876 AD. The mounds were actively used from the late 8th to the mid-10th century.

In 2024, georadar scans conducted by Riksantikvaren (The Norwegian Directorate for Cultural Heritage) confirmed the vast scale of the farm's operations. The scans revealed flat graves, a production facility, and over 1,000 ship rivets, cementing its status as a historical power centre.

=== Medieval era and noble ownership ===
As Christianity arrived in the region, the estate established early ties to the church. Historical records indicate the first stave church in Nordfjordeid was constructed on Myklebust grounds before later iterations of the church were moved to nearby plots.

During the high Middle Ages, the estate became part of the Nordfjordgodset (The Nordfjord Estate) and was owned by Audun Hugleiksson, a prominent baron and politician in 13th-century Norway. Following Hugleiksson's execution for treason in 1302, the Crown confiscated his properties. The king granted the estate to the fief lord (lensherre) of Bergen, Otte Svaleson Rømer, in 1361. The property remained in the Rømer family until their line died out, at which point it transitioned into the hands of other elites, including a canon in Nidaros in 1548 and the noble Bille family in 1626.

=== Clergy, Jotunet, and subdivision ===
From 1660 until the mid-19th century, the expansive estate was largely controlled by the local clergy, beginning with the priest Jens Bugge and his descendants. The Bugge family established themselves at a farmstead known as Jotunet, located a short distance from the main farm.

During the 18th century, Jotunet became a prominent local hub for trade and innkeeping. It was operated by a succession of priests, military officers, and bailiffs (futer), including Thomas Friis in the early 1700s, the German nobleman Johan Ludvig von Warnestedt (commander of the Nordre Nordfjordske Compagnie) in 1745, and the bailiff Søren Michaelson Mørch in 1751.

As the estate grew, it was systematically partitioned to be leased or sold. By the time of the major land consolidation (jordskifte) of 1863, the original singular Myklebust farm had been divided into eight distinct, smaller farming operations sharing the main farmyard.

In the 1880s, a subdivided section of the farm known as Svehogjen played a role in the political phenomenon known as myrmannsvesenet (the swamp men system). Small, agriculturally useless plots of swampland were sold to men strictly so they could meet the property ownership requirements necessary to secure voting rights.

=== Modern era ===
In the modern era, the vast agricultural lands of the original Myklebust estate were gradually repurposed to accommodate the expansion of Nordfjordeid's town center. The historical farmlands are now home to the town's primary and secondary schools, sports halls, a folk high school, and nursing homes. The estate's outfields in Myklebuståsen have been developed into one of the largest residential neighborhoods in the municipality.

Today, portions of the historical property still operate as a visitor farm, existing directly alongside the major archaeological sites and the Sagastad Viking Center, which houses a full-scale replica of the Myklebust Ship.

== See also ==
- Myklebust Burial Mound
- Myklebust Ship
- Sagastad
