= Jacob Bredesen =

Norwegian politician (born 1998)

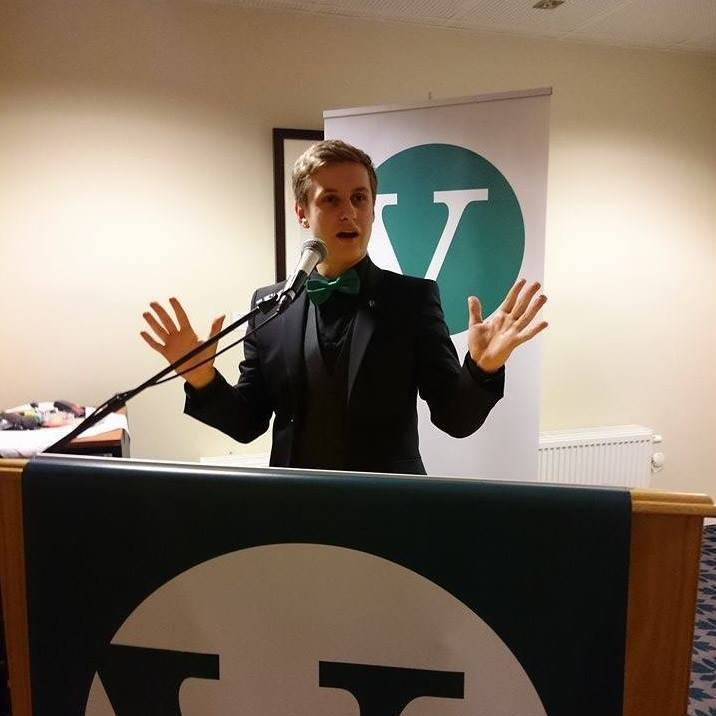
Jacob Bredesen

Jacob Jansen Bredesen (born 21 November 1998) is a British–Norwegian marketing executive and former youth politician. He serves as the marketing director for Sagastad, where he is known for campaigns promoting Norwegian Viking heritage. His initiatives, including the sea launch of the Myklebust ship replica and a 2026 FIFA World Cup supporter activation, attracted international attention and engagement. Footage he produced has been utilized by Norwegian state and royal institutions. His work has been featured by international media including appearances on NRK, NDR, and Amazon Prime Video.

== Career ==
In 2024, Bredesen directed the digital marketing strategy for the sea launch of the Myklebust ship replica. The campaign reached over 85 million users online and increased the social media following to nearly 100,000, positioning Sagastad as one of the most followed cultural attractions in Norway. During the campaign he managed collaborations with automotive influencer Supercar Blondie. and coordinated a Viking wedding with Norway's former Minister of Culture Abid Raja acting as lawspeaker.

In connection to the UNESCO World Heritage bid for the Myklebust Burial Mound with the Norwegian Directorate for Cultural Heritage Bredesen captured footage of an archaeological find that generated viral content, resulting in reports by international media such as Newsweek.

During 2025 Bredesen coordinated a stunt where 2019 Worlds Strongest Man Martins Licis pulled the Myklebust ship out a wagon independently. He also coordinated a documentary starring Chris Pontius and later entered a partnership with Norwegian TV personality Leif Einar Lothe By February 2025, this established Sagastad as the most-followed cultural institution in Norway. In a 2025 article discussing Norwegian Viking heritage, Forbes described Sagastad as "one of the best examples" of how Viking heritage can be presented, highlighting the interpretation, investment and community engagement. National Geographic noted continued public visibility through content shared on social media, including depictions of Viking raids on cruise ships and humorous voyages inspired by contemporary geopolitical events.

By 2026, under Bredesen's ongoing management, Sagastad had become the most followed attraction in Scandinavia, accumulating over 180,000 followers and hundreds of millions of views. During the April 2026 royal visit by Crown Prince Haakon and Prince Sverre Magnus, Bredesen served on the reception committee and accompanied the royal delegation to the Myklebust burial mound. As part of the official tour, he briefed the Crown Prince on his digital storytelling strategy and its role in expanding the site's international audience.

Later that summer during the 2026 FIFA World Cup, Bredesen engaged with the Norwegian national football team's "Viking row" supporter trend by organizing an event on the Myklebust ship. The event was coordinated in collaboration with the chant's creator, "MrRowrow", and the national supporter group Oljeberget.

Digital content from the campaign was shared by Norwegian national team footballer Erling Haaland. Concurrently, the Norwegian Royal House featured drone footage Bredesen had filmed of the royals rowing the ship during their visit in social media broadcasts. Media assets from the campaign were integrated into efforts by state entities, including Visit Norway and the Norwegian Ministry of Foreign Affairs.

Sagastad surpassed 200,000 followers on Instagram and nearly 400,000 followers across all platforms.

Bredesen was also responsible for technology at the Sagastad Viking Center. In the role he developed a Virtual reality experience that recreates Nordfjordeid during the Viking Age.

Since 2024 he has also been the marketing director for the cruise port in Nordfjordeid.

== Early life and education ==
=== Background ===
Bredesen was born in the United Kingdom, as the son of the dance teacher and choreographer Candice Bredesen and photographer and painter Tommy Bredesen. His parents had both studied art at the same university. He is the oldest of his siblings

He moved to the small Norwegian town of Florø in 2003 with his family; his father was from the town. His family moved to Nordfjordeid, in Stad Municipality.His mother was busy when the family lived in Florø, consequently she learned little Norwegian. When she was shopping he had to translate for her. This became important in 2006, when Bredesen was only seven years old. He saved the life of his 3-month-old sister, when her face turned blue and she struggled to breathe. As his mother knew little Norwegian she called the British emergency number 999 instead of the Norwegian 113. Jacob called the correct number and assisted emergency services.

When Bredesen was confirmed he traveled to Malawi with the Norwegian Church Aid, to learn about aid work in the region . He was later involved in the youth organization Changemaker. After this his interests moved over to politics he joined the regional youth council and the political party Venstre.

Bredesen attended Eid Upper Secondary School. He then studied International Baccalaureate at UWC Red Cross Nordic in Fjaler Municipality.

=== Political work ===
Bredesen was the president of Sogn og Fjordane Unge Venstre, and thus also a member of the county council of Venstre in Sogn og Fjordane, and a member of the national board of Unge Venstre.

He was also employed as the election secretary during the 2015 election.

Bredesen was the first sixteen year old to vote in the 2015 municipal election in Eid Municipality He was unable to vote in the county elections due to this being a trail for 16 and 17-year-old's being able to vote in select municipalities.

Bredesen has supported more liberal drug laws in Norway, such as legalizing cannabis. He has supported the right for students to freely chose the school they want to attend in the county and expressed that he believes the school days should start later. When he lived in Fjaler as a student at UWC he started work on a E-sports class for Dale Upper Secondary School. He has also demanded that asylum seekers get to work as they wait for judgement in Norway. Bredesen has also criticized the Solberg cabinet for not focusing on climate issues.

In 2016 he was opposed to Christian songs being used in the county parliament and said that religion and politics should not mix. He was later appointed as the chair of the Norwegian Humanist Association in Nordfjord. He has also been a vocal critic of Donald Trump and far-right ideology.

Bredesen stepped down from his roles in 2017 to focus on his studies.

In 2023 he was a candidate for Stad Venstre in the municipal elections.

== Ventures ==
Bredesen studied game design in England, but dropped out to focus on his own projects. Since 2018 he has run the video game company. He has published games on Nintendo Switch, Xbox and PlayStation platforms.
