= Vemund Kamban =

9th-century petty king of Firdafylke

- Petty king of Firdafylke Vémundr Kamban
- Reign: c. 870
- Predecessor: Audbjörn Frøybjørnsson
- Successor: Håkon Grjotgardsson (as Earl under Harald Fairhair)
- Died: c. 870; Naustdal, Firdafylke (modern Stad, Norway)
- Cause of death: Executed by hús-brenna (hall-burning)
Names
- Vemund Frøybjørnsson
- House: Myklebust dynasty
- Father: Frøybjørn
- Religion: Old Norse religion

Vemund Kamban was a 9th-century King of the Kingdom of Firda (in modern-day Vestland, Norway). He briefly assumed control over the region following the death of his brother, King Audbjørn of Firda, during the unification of Norway by Harald Fairhair. Vemund is most prominently recorded in Snorri Sturluson's Heimskringla (specifically Harald Fairhair's saga), which details his resistance against King Harald and his subsequent death in a traditional hall-burning (hús-brenna) at Naustdal.

== Kingship and conflict with Harald Fairhair ==
Vemund belonged to the ruling lineage of Firdafylke. He was the son of Frøybjørn and the brother of King Audbjørn. The brothers ruled during a period when western Norway was organized into a series of independent petty kingdoms actively challenged by the expanding power of Harald Fairhair.

During the Battle of Solskjel (c. 866), King Audbjørn aligned with King Arnvid of Sunnmøre to halt Harald Fairhair's southern expansion. The coalition was defeated, and King Audbjørn was killed in battle. Following his brother's death—whose remains are associated with the Myklebust Ship cremation at the Myklebust Burial Mound in Nordfjordeid—Vemund Kamban took up the mantle of kingship over Firdafylke.

Vemund refused to submit to Harald Fairhair's authority. He maintained control over Firdafylke into the late autumn. Because the weather made sailing south around the perilous Stad peninsula dangerous late in the year, King Harald opted to winter in Trondheim, leaving his newly appointed ally, Rognvald Eysteinsson (Jarl of Møre), to secure the western districts.

== Death at Naustdal ==
According to the sagas, Rognvald Mørejarl took the tactical initiative during the winter. Rather than braving the open sea, Rognvald and his men took the "inner way" overland across Eid (modern Nordfjordeid) and traveled south into the fjords.

Through the use of scouts, Rognvald learned that King Vemund was attending a feast (veitsle) at an estate in Naustdal. Arriving under the cover of night, Rognvald and his forces surrounded the guest-house. In a brutal but culturally established method of assassination known as a hús-brenna, they set fire to the building, burning King Vemund and 90 of his men alive.

Following the massacre, Rognvald seized Vemund's longships and all of his movable wealth. The event effectively ended formal resistance in Firdafylke, allowing Harald Fairhair to absorb the district into his unified kingdom the following spring.

=== Geographical location ===
Historically, there has been some geographical confusion regarding the exact location of Vemund's death, as there are multiple locations named Naustdal in western Norway. Local tradition, topographical evidence, and historical encyclopedias associate the event strictly with the Naustdal settlement located in the modern Stad municipality (historically Eids prestegjeld), rather than the larger Naustdal in Sunnfjord.

At this specific Naustdal in Stad, two large standing stones (bautasteiner) are erected, including a six-meter-high stone situated on a local farm. Local folklore maintains these were raised in memory of King Vemund and the men who perished in the fire.

== Historiography and genealogical discrepancies ==
In some modern genealogical reconstructions, Vemund Kamban is occasionally conflated with another contemporary figure: Vemund Vikingsson (often referred to as Vemund den Gamle or Vemund the Old) of Bremanger.

The confusion stems from geographic proximity and narrative overlap in the sagas. Immediately after Vemund Kamban was killed in Naustdal, the berserker Berle-Kåre (from Berle in Bremanger) arrived at the site with a fully manned longship and allied himself with Rognvald Mørejarl. Because Berle-Kåre's father was named Vemund Vikingsson, and both operated in the same geographic theater (Bremanger, Stad, and the Nordfjord network), some later readers incorrectly assumed they were the same individual. Vemund Kamban was a petty king of Firdafylke and brother to Audbjørn, entirely separate from the Bremanger chieftain lineage that eventually produced the skald Egill Skallagrímsson.

== Celtic connections and the Kamban byname ==
The ruling lineage of Firdafylke—frequently referred to in modern historiography as the Myklebust dynasty—demonstrates strong evidence of high-status contact with the British Isles during the 9th century. This Norse-Gael connection is physically and linguistically preserved through the history of the brothers Audbjørn and Vemund.

While Old Norse naming conventions typically relied on patronymics, individuals were often given descriptive bynames. Vemund's byname, Kamban, is not of Old Norse origin. Linguists and historians establish that it derives from the Old Irish word cambán (from camb, meaning "crooked," combined with a diminutive suffix), translating directly to "the crooked one" or "the cripple." The use of a Gaelic loanword for a western Norwegian petty king's nickname suggests direct interaction with Norse-Gael settlements, or potentially a physical trait recognized by Celtic-speaking thralls or mercenaries in his retinue.

This linguistic link is firmly corroborated by the archaeological evidence from his brother's burial. Following Audbjørn's death at Solskjel, his cremated remains were interred in the Myklebust Burial mound at Nordfjordeid. The ashes were placed inside an imported Irish bronze vessel adorned with enameled mounts depicting human figures (often referred to locally as the Myklebustmannen).

Archaeological consensus identifies this vessel not as a depiction of pagan fertility deities, but as looted ecclesiastical metalwork. It was originally created as a holy vessel—likely a reliquary or hanging bowl—in a Christian monastery or church in Ireland before being stolen by Viking raiders and repurposed as a high-status cremation urn. Together, the looted Celtic vessel containing the fallen king and the Gaelic byname of his surviving brother firmly anchor the Firdafylke rulers to the western sea routes and the early Viking expansion into the British Isles.
