= Sagastad =

Coordinates: 61°54′31″N 5°59′05″E

Sagastad Viking Center
- Sagastad Vikingsenter
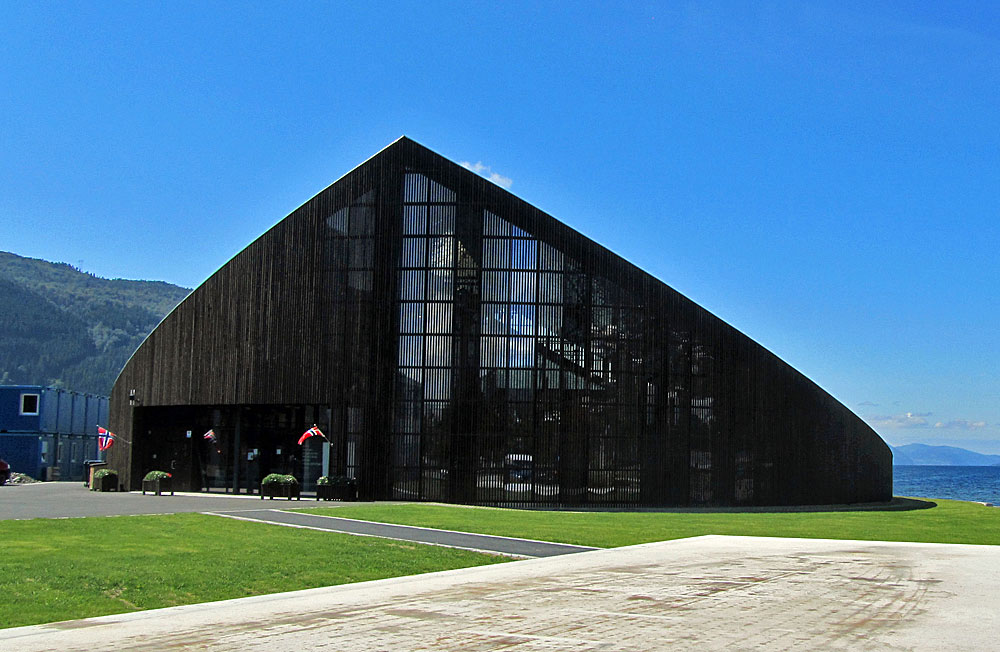
- The Sagastad Viking Center building
- Established: 10 May 2019
- Location: Nordfjordeid
- Type: Knowledge Center
- Accreditation: University of Bergen
- Collections: Myklebust Ship
- Visitors: 120 000+ (2023)
- CTO: Jacob Bredesen
- CEO: Eli Førde Aarskog
- Chairperson: Kjell A. Storeide
- Architect: Arild Wåge
- Employees: 3 in administration
- Parking: On site (no charge)
- Website: sagastad.no

Sagastad Viking Center (Norwegian: Sagastad Viking Senter) is a knowledge center situated in Nordfjordeid in Western Norway. It is considered a landmark in the town, and is the most visited attraction in the area. The center is the home of the full-scale reconstruction of the largest Viking long ship ever discovered; the Myklebust ship. Sagastad is the most followed attraction in Norway on Instagram.

The center also houses an exhibition on the Viking history of the town of Nordfjordeid. The center was opened in 2019. The center focuses on the Viking age, mainly the mid to late 9th century. It also presents the story of King Audbjorn of the Firda Kingdom whom ruled from Nordfjordeid and the story of the excavation of the Myklebust Burial Mound.

The building also serves as a cultural center hosting concerts and other events.

== Location and visit ==
The Sagastad Viking Center is located in the town center of Nordfjordeid, in Sjøgata next to the Sagapark and west of Eidsgata. The building sits on the shore, with a slipway for sea launching of the Myklebust ship. It is a 1.1 km walk from the port where cruise tourists disembark. The closest airport is Sandane Airport, Anda. The closest bus station is the Nordfjordeid Bus Station that is situated 1km from the center.

The centers entrance conditions are varied dependent on season. From May to August the center is open to the public throughout the entire week. During the Autumn and Spring it is usually closed on weekends, however during cruise days it will open for cruise guests regardless of seasonal variation.

The use of cameras and video recorders is permitted inside, including flash photography.

Cruise tourists can also enter the museum through the zero emission bus tours offered at the docks, that include entrance in the ticket.

== Exhibition ==
The center houses an interactive exhibition that presents the history of the Viking age in the region. It is divided into three main sections, "Nordfjordeid in the Viking Age", "The findings of Myklebust" and information about the Myklebust ship itself, including further information about long ships and the construction methods used

=== Accreditation ===
The content presented in the center is rooted in research in collaboration with the University of Bergen, ensuring historical accuracy in the exhibition.

=== The Myklebust Ship ===
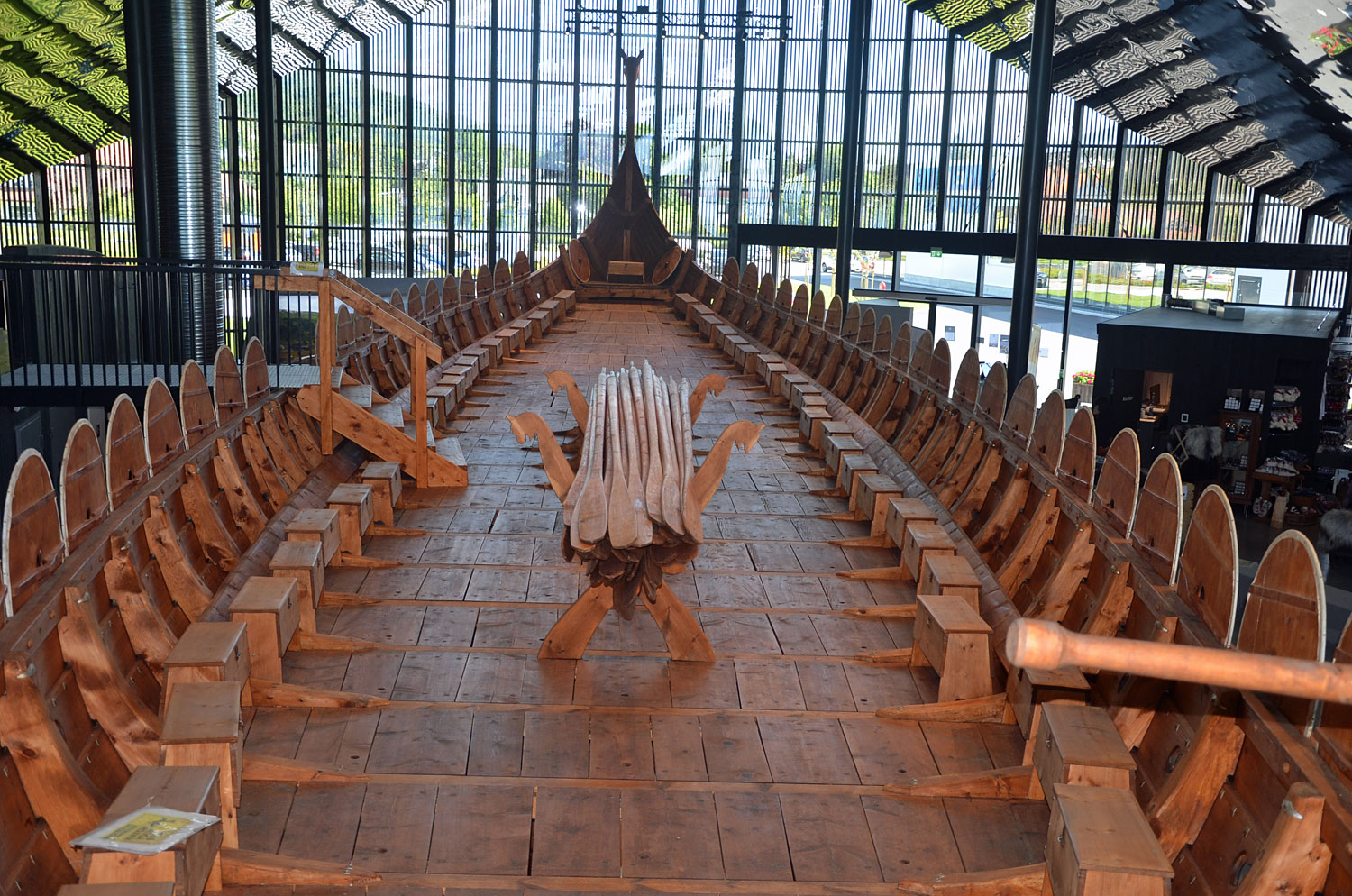
The deck of the Myklebustship seen from inside Sagastad

The most important exhibit at Sagastad is the reconstruction of the Myklebust ship, the largest viking ship ever discovered in Norway. Visitors are able to board the 30 meter long ship inside the center. The entire ship is accessible from a boarding ramp. The ship is situated in the middle of the center, surrounded by interactive exhibitions that are mainly connected to the ship and the other burial sites at Nordfjordeid.

The rear of the building features large rear doors and a ramp down to the fjord to facilitate launching of the vessel, something that happens on special occasions.

=== Graves in Nordfjordeid ===
The Myklebust gravemound known as Rundehågjen is both the last and largest cremation grave found from the Viking Age. It was excavated in 1874 by Anders Lorange.

He came to Nordfjordeid from Bergen in 1874 to investigate the large burial mound that is locally called Rundehågjen or Lisje Skjoratippen. The mound stands on Myklebust farm which used to houses 5 burial mounds. But this very mound turned out to be unique.

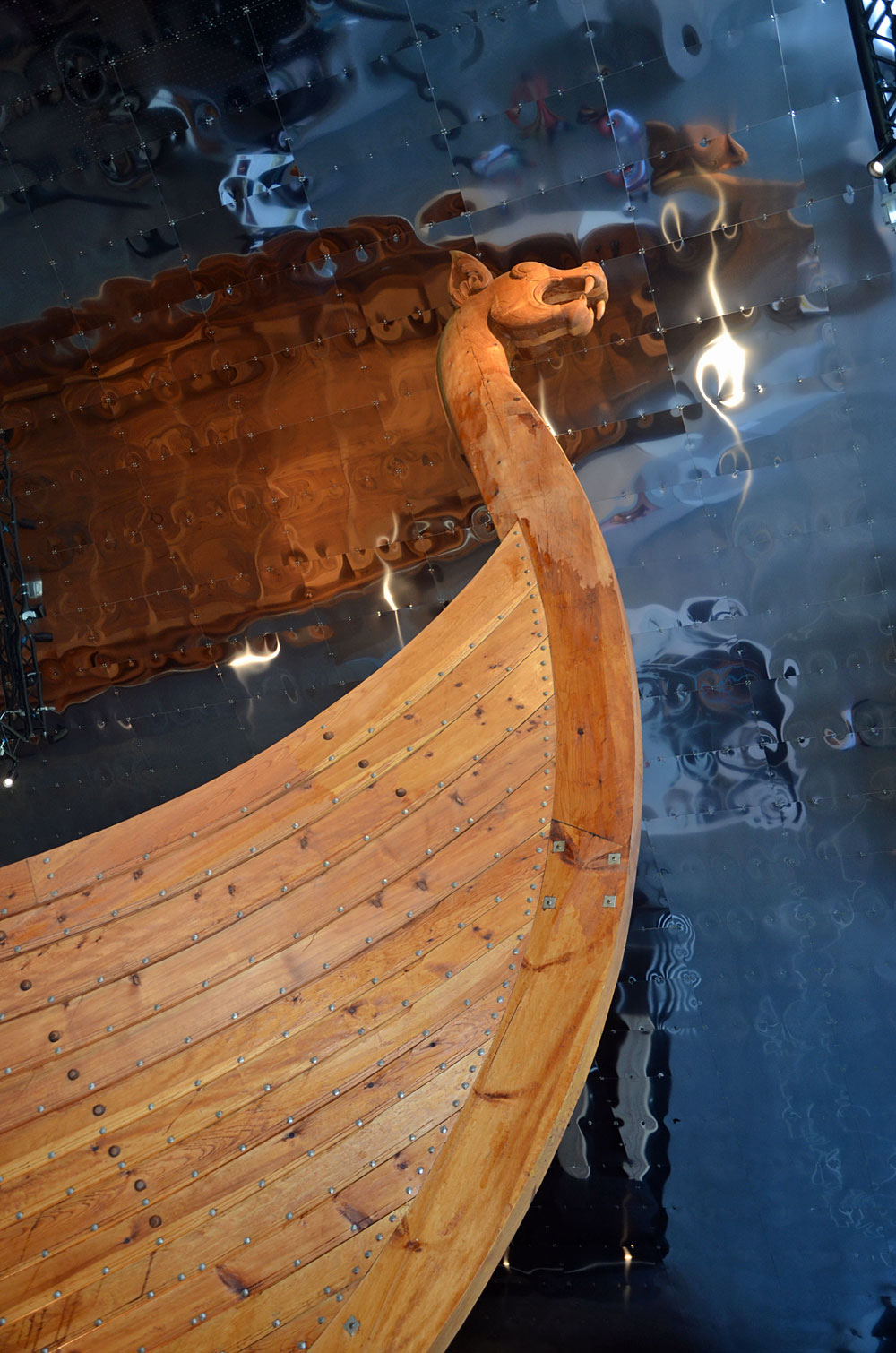
The head of the Myklebust ship

The mound was about 30 meters in diameter, was almost 4 meters tall, and had a wide moat around it. The mound contained the remains of a unique Viking ship and a number of high-status objects from the end of the ninth century. The sumptuous burial remains in the mound and traces of the mysterious rituals performed at the burial, provided a fascinating insight into the way of life and worldview of the Norse society that lived in Nordfjordeid more than a thousand years ago.

The ship in the mound was named Myklebustskipet, after the farm name where it was found. Unfortunately, the ship came in the shadow of the Viking ships that were found some years later: the Gokstad ship in 1880 and the Oseberg ship in 1904. The reason was that the Gokstad ship and the Oseberg ship were found intact, while the Myklebust ship had been burned during the burial. There was therefore not much to see of the Myklebust ship.

=== King Audbjørn of Firda ===
The exhibition claims that King Audbjørn of the Fjords final resting place was in the Myklebust grave. The King was mentioned in the Sagas and died in the battle of Solskjell in the year of 876. The colossal size of the Myklebustship suggests it was owned by a powerful chieftain and the ship is also dated to the late 9th century. Nordfjordeid was the center of power in the old kingdom of Firda during this period.

=== Virtual reality ===
The center offers a virtual reality experience for visitors in the exhibition. The experience offers a 3D recreation of Nordfjordeid during the 9th century. Guests are able to teleport around the Viking village, examine artifacts, and test their archery skills. The VR offering was launched in 2020 and developed in house by the centers CTO, Jacob Bredesen.

=== Audio guide ===
Visitors at the center are able to use a companion app when visiting the center that provides an audio guide in French, Mandarin, Spanish and German. There is also a webapp that provides the same functionality.

== Opening ==
The center was opened in 2019, by the Minister of Research and Higher Education, Iselin Nybø. Prior to the official opening the famous reconstruction of the Myklebustship was christened, by the Minister of Culture Trine Skei Grande, on the Eidsfjord.
