= Storeide =

Storeide is a surname. Notable people with the surname include:

- Hjalmar Olai Storeide (1901–1961), Norwegian politician
- Kjell A. Storeide (born 1952), Norwegian businessman
