= Kingdom of Firda =

Petty Kingdom of Norway

Kingdom of Firda Firðafylkí
- Status: Petty kingdom
- Capital: Myklebust (Nordfjordeid)
- Common languages: Old Norse
- Religion: Old Norse religion
- Government: Monarchy
- King
  - c. 710s: Frøygard Gardsson
  - c. 830s: Frøybjørn Frøygardsson
  - ?–868: Audbjörn Frøybjørnsson
  - 868–870: Vemund Kamban
Succeeded by
Kingdom of Norway (872–1397)
- Today part of: Norway

The Kingdom of Firda (Old Norse: Firðafylkí) was a petty kingdom in western Norway during the Viking Age. It was one of several independent realms that existed prior to the unification of Norway.

The kingdom was ruled by a local dynasty whose primary seat of power was located at the Myklebust farm in modern-day Nordfjordeid. Its independence ended circa 868–870 AD following a series of conflicts with King Harald Fairhair, culminating in the deaths of its last independent kings, Audbjørn Frøybjørnsson and his brother Vemund Kamban. After their fall, the region was governed by Earls (Jarls) appointed by the Norwegian crown.

== Etymology and geography ==
The name of the kingdom derives from the Old Norse word Firdir, meaning "The Fjords," while the inhabitants were referred to as firdir. Combined, the term Firdafylke translates to the "Fjord-people's county."

Following the Viking Age, it was common practice to divide large counties into two halves (halvfylke). Firdafylke was split geographically into Nordfirda halvfylke and Sunnfirda halvfylke. Over the centuries, these names were contracted to form the modern traditional districts of Nordfjord and Sunnfjord in Vestland county.

== Legendary origins ==
The early lineage of the Firda kings is rooted in Old Norse mythological genealogies. According to the medieval Icelandic tract Hversu Noregr byggðist ("How Norway was Inhabited"), the early rulers of Firdafylke descended from the mythical sea-king Gorr Thorrasson, whose lineages were said to have populated the western coast of Scandinavia.

Tracing the immediate pre-unification lineage, the text explicitly establishes the rulers of the district: "Freygarðr átti Fjörðu ok Fjalir. Hans synir váru þeir Freysteinn gamli ok Freybjörn, faðir Auðbjarnar." (Freygard ruled Firda and Fjaler. His sons were Freysteinn the Old and Freybjörn, father of Audbjørn). This dynastic record firmly places Audbjørn and his brother Vemund Kamban as the direct inheritors of the kingdom.

== Seat of power and the Myklebust mound ==
The geographical and political center of Firdafylke was based in Nordfjordeid. The name Myklebust derives from the Old Norse mikill (large) and bólstadr (farm), an etymological indicator of a region's central estate and seat of power.

Archaeological evidence strongly supports the area's political importance. The site is home to the Myklebust Burial Mound (locally known as Rundehogjen). The mound was first excavated in 1874 by archaeologist Anders Lorange on behalf of the Bergen Museum.

Lorange's excavation uncovered the cremated remains of the clinker-built Myklebust ship. With an estimated length of over 30 meters, it is one of the largest Viking ships ever discovered. The burial included a Celtic bronze bowl containing cremated human remains, along with 44 shield bosses, indicating a king buried with his full crew. The massive scale of the burial mound and the wealth of imported goods underscore the immense regional power and maritime reach of the Firda kings.

== Solve Klofe and the Battle of Solskjel ==
During the mid-to-late 9th century, the kingdom was ruled by Audbjørn Frøybjørnsson. As Harald Fairhair began his aggressive campaign southwards to unify Norway under a single crown, the western petty kingdoms formed a coalition to resist him.

The resistance was instigated in large part by Solve Klofe (Sölve Klofi), the son of the defeated King of Nordmøre. After surviving Harald's initial northern conquests, Solve spent the winter raiding before fleeing south to Firdafylke to appeal to King Audbjørn for military aid.

Persuaded by Solve's warnings, King Audbjørn allied with King Arnvid of Sunnmøre to halt Harald’s expansion. The combined forces lashed their ships together stem-to-stem, a standard Viking naval tactic used to create a massive floating platform for infantry combat. They clashed with Harald's fleet at the Second Battle of Solskjel (c. 868). According to the saga, Harald's flagship was heavily defended at the bow (rausn) by his elite berserkers. The fighting was fierce, with Arnvid's forecastle men driven backward behind the mast. Harald eventually boarded the allied flagship, leading to a rout where both King Audbjørn and King Arnvid were killed on the deck, while Solve Klofe managed to flee.

Modern osteological analysis of the burned bones found in the Myklebust mound's bronze bowl revealed they belonged to a well-built man between the ages of 30 and 35 who had sustained fatal cuts and stab wounds. This physical evidence closely aligns with the saga accounts of King Audbjørn's battlefield death and his subsequent burial at the seat of his power.

== Fall of Firda ==
Following Audbjørn's death, his brother Vemund Kamban assumed control of Firdafylke. Vemund refused to submit to Harald's authority, maintaining the kingdom's resistance into the late autumn.

King Harald's advisors explicitly warned him against trying to sail south around the perilous Stad peninsula so late in the year. Because the autumn seas were too dangerous, Harald retreated north to Trondheim for the winter, leaving his newly appointed ally, Rognvald Eysteinsson (Jarl of Møre), tasked with securing the western districts.

Taking the tactical initiative, Rognvald avoided the impassable open sea and instead took the "inner way" overland across Eid (modern Nordfjordeid). Utilizing this land-bridge to bypass the coast, Rognvald's scouts discovered that King Vemund was attending a veitsle (a royal feast for collecting tribute) at an estate in Naustdal. Arriving under the cover of darkness, Rognvald and his men surrounded the hall. Using a traditional Norse assassination method known as hús-brenna (hall-burning), they set fire to the building, burning King Vemund alive along with ninety of his men. Rognvald subsequently seized all of Vemund's longships and movable wealth, breaking the military backbone of Firdafylke.

== Rule of the Jarls ==
The following spring, King Harald sailed south to formally absorb the leaderless district into his unified kingdom. He appointed Hákon Grjótgarðsson as Jarl (Earl) of both Firdafylke and Sygnafylke (Sogn). Hákon's rule over the region was brief; shortly after taking control, he was killed in a naval battle at Fjaler against a rival Earl named Atli the Slender.

In the early 10th century, administration of the region passed to a powerful lineage of hersar (local military commanders). This included Hroald of Firdafylke and his son, Thorir Hroaldsson, who maintained strong ties to the Norwegian crown. Thorir's son, Arinbjørn Thorirsson (c. 935–950), became one of the most famous lords of the era, traveling to England and Scotland alongside the exiled King Eric Bloodaxe.

== Olav Tryggvason and Christianization ==
While Harald Fairhair had broken Firdafylke's political independence, the region remained fiercely pagan for over a century. The district was forced to adopt Christianity in the late 10th century during the reign of King Olaf Tryggvason, a transition deeply tied to the legend of Saint Sunniva.

According to the 12th-century Latin hagiography Acta Sanctorum in Selio and Oddr Snorrason's Saga of Olaf Tryggvason, Sunniva was an Irish princess who fled an unwanted marriage to a pagan king. She and her followers sailed east without oars or sails, eventually washing ashore on the island of Selja, located off the Stad peninsula in northern Firdafylke.

The local pagan inhabitants viewed them with suspicion and drove them into the island's coastal caves, where they were entombed and martyred by a sudden rockslide. In 996 AD, King Olav Tryggvason and Bishop Sigurd landed on Selja and reportedly discovered the illuminated, uncorrupted remains of Sunniva and the "Seljumen". The king immediately ordered the construction of a church and a shrine at the site. This established Selja as the first major pilgrimage center in Norway and laid the groundwork for the Bishopric of Selja, which served as the formal ecclesiastical center for all of western Norway until the see was relocated to Bergen in 1170.

The following year, in 997 AD, King Olav took definitive military action to secure the spiritual conversion of the mainland. He summoned the chieftains and farmers of Firdafylke, Sygnafylke, Sunnmøre, and Romsdal to a major assembly (thing) at Dragseidet. Located on the Stad peninsula, Dragseidet was a strategic mountain pass and overland portage used by sailors to haul their ships across the land to avoid the deadly waters of the Stad ocean (Stadhavet). Arriving with a massive military force, King Olav issued a harsh ultimatum to the western leaders: accept baptism or face his army in battle. Vastly outnumbered, the chieftains of Firdafylke submitted to the king's demands, formally ending the district's pagan era.

== Legacy and the Gulating ==
Despite the loss of its independent kings, the district of Firdafylke remained a central pillar of political and legal power in western Norway. Following the unification, Firdafylke was integrated into the jurisdiction of the Gulating, the oldest and largest regional parliamentary assembly (thing) and law court in Norway.

According to the sagas, the Gulating laws were formalized by King Haakon the Good (c. 945–960) in consultation with local chieftains. The original core jurisdiction of this legislative assembly comprised only three western counties: Sygnafylke, Hördafylke, and Firdafylke. Representatives (nevndemenn) from Firdafylke traveled south annually to the assembly site in Gulen (modern Gulen Municipality) to negotiate laws, settle disputes, and formally submit to or reject the policies of the Norwegian kings. This foundational legal framework heavily influenced the later development of the Icelandic Althing and cemented Firdafylke's enduring legacy in the structural formation of the Norwegian state.

== Districts ==
Firda was divided into 15 districts :

=== Norðfirðir (Nordfjord) ===
- Stađ
- Davika
- Eygis
- Horninjadal
- Gloppa
- Breiđefnis
- Innvika
- Alda
- Strjón
- Jólstr
- Brandseyar

=== Sunnfirðir (Sunnfjord) ===
- Fjarđar
- Askvallar
- Ytri Dala
- Innri Dala
