= Myklebostad =

Myklebostad may refer to the following locations:

- Myklebostad, Møre og Romsdal, a village in Molde Municipality in Møre og Romsdal county, Norway
- Myklebostad, Bodø, a village in Bodø Municipality in Nordland county, Norway
- Myklebostad, Tjeldsund, a village in Tjeldsund Municipality in Nordland county, Norway
- Myklebostad, an area in Leinesfjord in Steigen Municipality in Nordland county, Norway

== See also ==
- Myklebustad
- Myklebost (disambiguation)
- Myklebust (disambiguation)
