= Myklebost =

Myklebost may refer to:

== Places ==
- Myklebost, Fjord, a village in the Valldalen valley of Fjord Municipality in Møre og Romsdal county, Norway
- Myklebust, Harøya (sometimes spelled Myklebost), a village on Harøya island in Ålesund Municipality in Møre og Romsdal county, Norway
- Myklebost, Ålesund, a village on Ellingsøya island in Ålesund Municipality in Møre og Romsdal county, Norway
- Myklebost, Vanylven, a village in Vanylven Municipality in Møre og Romsdal county, Norway

== See also ==
- Myklebust (disambiguation)
- Myklebostad (disambiguation)
