= Battle of Solskjell =

Battle of Solskjell may refer to either of two battles that took place ca. the year 870 AD in the process of unification of Norway:

- First battle of Solskjell
- Second battle of Solskjell
