= Nordfjordeid =

Village in Stad Municipality, Norway

Nordfjordeid Eid
- Village
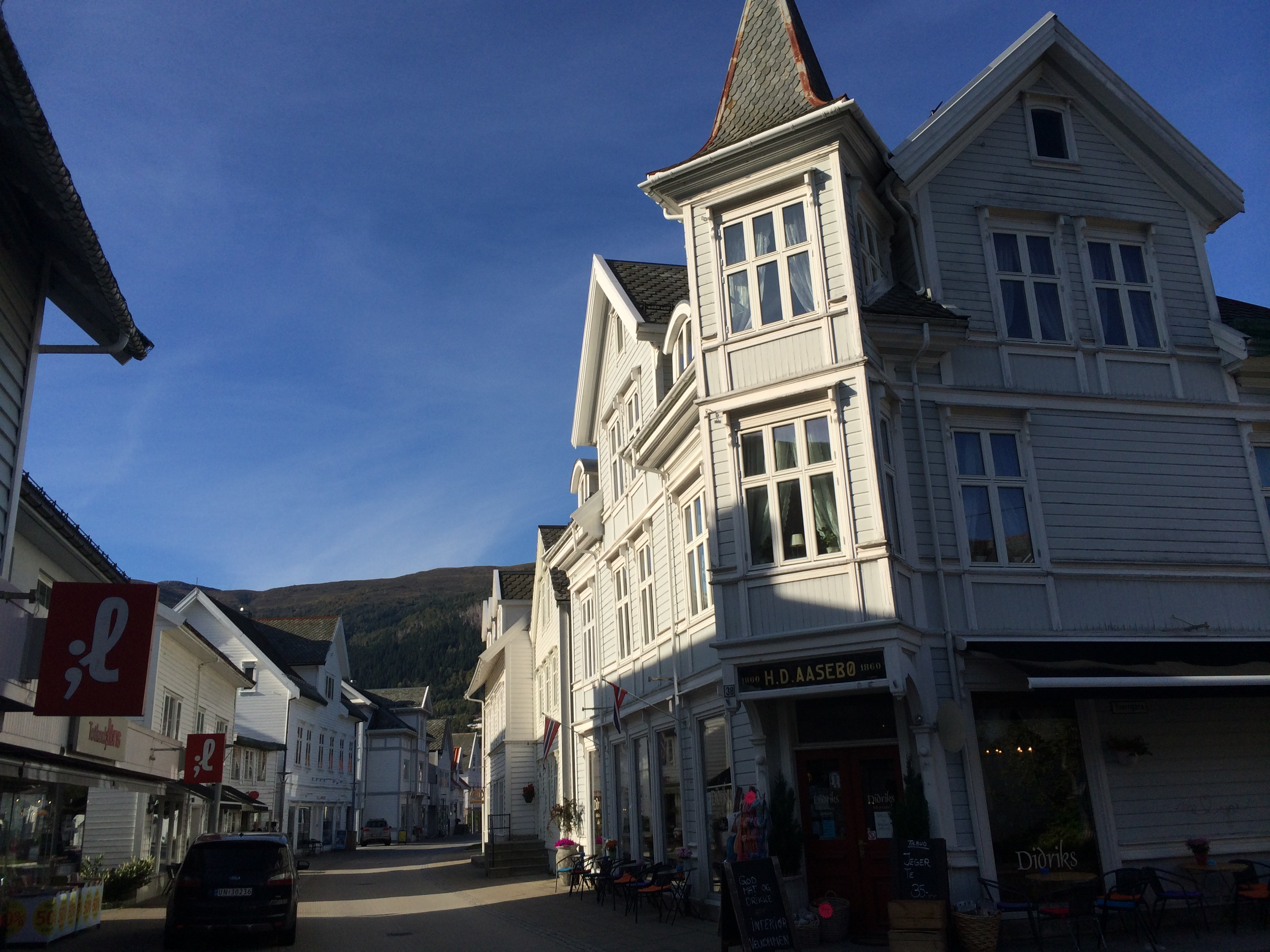
- View of Eidsgata the primary shopping street of the town.
- Motto: The Viking Destination
- Interactive map of Nordfjordeid
- Location within Vestland Location within Norway
- Coordinates: 61.9122°N 5.9856°E
- Country: Norway
- Region: Western Norway
- County: Vestland
- District: Nordfjord
- Municipality: Stad Municipality

Area
  - Total: 2.53 km^{2} (0.98 sq mi)
- Elevation: 6 m (20 ft)

Population (2024)
  - Total: 3,178
  - Density: 1,256/km^{2} (3,250/sq mi)
- Time zone: UTC+01:00 (CET)
  - Summer (DST): UTC+02:00 (CEST)
- Post Code: 6770 Nordfjordeid
- Vehicle registration: UAXXXXX

Nordfjordeid is the regional capital of Nordfjord and the administrative centre of Stad Municipality in Vestland county, Norway. Situated at the end of Eidsfjorden (an arm of Nordfjorden), west of the lake Hornindalsvatnet. The village serves as a commercial and cultural hub for the greater Nordfjord region..

As of 2024, the 2.53-square-kilometre (630-acre) urban area (tettsted) has a population of 3,178.

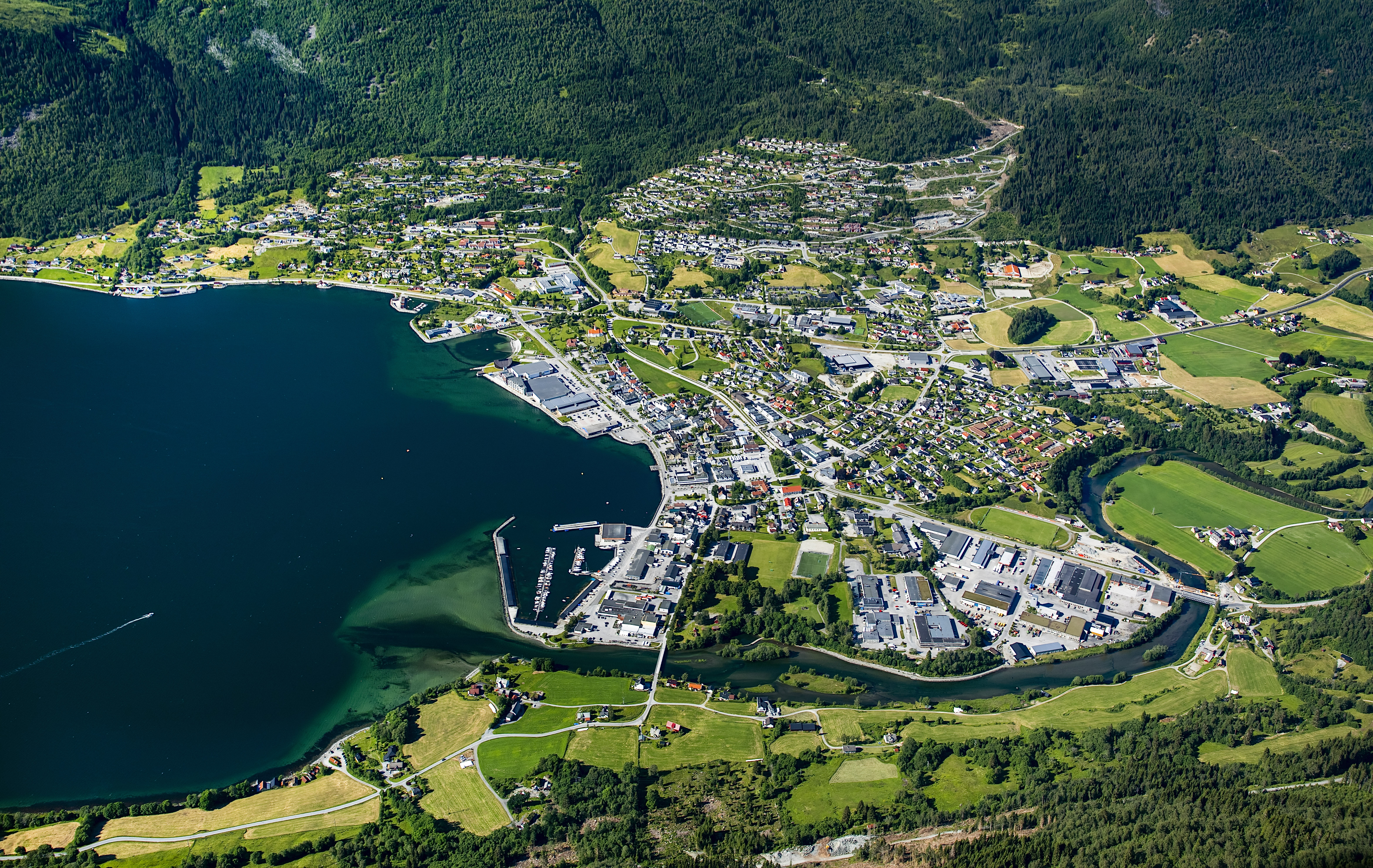
Nordfjordeid as seen from the air (2021)

The local economy is driven by commerce, agriculture, timber, and a growing tourism sector. This growth is heavily supported by the Port of Nordfjordeid, which serves as a major gateway for international cruise traffic as the 10th most visited passenger terminal in Norway.

Nordfjordeid functions as the primary shopping destination for the surrounding areas, centered around its historic main street, Eidsgata and modern commercial street Sjøgata along the towns waterfront where Alti Nordfjord the largest shopping centre in Nordfjord is located.

Historically serving as the centre of power for the Kingdom of Firda during the Viking Age the town is known for its cultural and historical attractions, most notably the Sagastad Viking Center—which houses a full-scale replica of the Myklebust ship - the largest Viking ship ever found, the Norwegian Fjordhorse Center, and Ekserserplassen, Norway's oldest military parade ground.

The regional capital the village is home to several regional institutions, including the Nordfjord Hospital, the Statens Hus government complex, a branch of the Sogn og Fjordane District Court, Eid Church, and Operahuset Nordfjord, which connects to Eid Upper Secondary School.

Nordfjordeid is a regional transport junction, located at the intersection of the European route E39 highway (connecting Bergen to Ålesund) and Norwegian National Road 15.

== Geography ==
Nordfjordeid is situated in a valley at the eastern head of Eidsfjorden, an inner branch of the larger Nordfjorden. The physical landscape is characterized by the fjord's coastline to the west and steep mountainous terrain to the north and south. Just to the east of the village lies Hornindalsvatnet, which holds the record as the deepest lake in Europe. The Eidselva river flows westward out of Hornindalsvatnet, cutting directly through the Nordfjordeid valley before emptying into the fjord.

The village acts as a central hub for several smaller surrounding settlements. The village of Stårheim is located about 12 kilometres (7.5 mi) to the west along the northern shore of the fjord, Mogrenda is about 5 kilometres (3.1 mi) to the east, and Lote lies approximately 7 kilometres (4.3 mi) to the southeast.

Nordfjordeid is deeply integrated into the western Norwegian highway network via the European route E39 and National Road 15. The closest regional aviation hub is Sandane Airport, Anda (SNDL), located roughly 45 minutes south by car via the Lote–Anda ferry crossing.

The highway network connects the village to major cities such as Ålesund, Bergen, and the national capital of Oslo, though road travel is heavily dictated by the mountainous fjord terrain.

== Climate ==
Nordfjordeid has a temperature oceanic climate (Cfb in the Köppen climate classification). The yearly average precipitation is around 2100 mm, which makes it significantly wetter than the nearby villages Sandane and Stryn. This large amount of precipitation is caused by orographic lift, while the other villages are more sheltered by the mountains.

Climate data for Nordfjordeid-Nymark 1991–2020 (34 m)
Month	Jan	Feb	Mar	Apr	May	Jun	Jul	Aug	Sep	Oct	Nov	Dec	Year
Average precipitation mm (inches)	256.1 (10.08)	216.1 (8.51)	189.8 (7.47)	112.3 (4.42)	94.8 (3.73)	89.1 (3.51)	90.4 (3.56)	118.3 (4.66)	182.6 (7.19)	209.6 (8.25)	237.4 (9.35)	276.1 (10.87)	2,072.6 (81.6)
Average precipitation days (≥ 1.0 mm)	18	17	17	13	12	13	13	14	16	17	17	19	186
Source: Noaa WMO averages 91-2020 Norway

== Etymology ==
During the Viking Age, Nordfjordeid was referred to as Eygis or Eid, meaning the inner most part of a fjord. Nordfjord directly translated means 'North Fjord'. The kingdom of Firda was known as the kingdom of the fjords, and was divided into Sunnfjord and Nordfjord, meaning South Fjord and North Fjord. In old Norse the administrative region of Nordfjord was referred to Nyrðri hlutr sýsla and later Nordfjorð sýsla at the time of the Gulating.

Thus Nordfjordeid is a literal description of the location of the village: the inner part of the northern fjord.

== History ==
=== Pre History ===
==== Old Stone age ====
The oldest archeological discovery made in Nordfjordeid is over 6,000 years old. An axe from the Paleolithic Period. The area was well suited for fishing and hunting during the Stone Age, however little is known about human activity during this period.

==== Neolithic and Bronze age ====
During the late Stone Age, there was a transition from hunter-gatherer societies to agriculture. In Nordfjordeid there is archeological evidence of human settlements dating back to the late Neolithic and Bronze Age. Remains of pits used for cooking, firepits, stone axes, technical production establishments, and up to ten huts have been discovered in the area known as Golvsengane. This is believed to be the predecessor settlement to the Myklebust farm that was central during the later Iron and Viking Ages.

=== Viking age ===
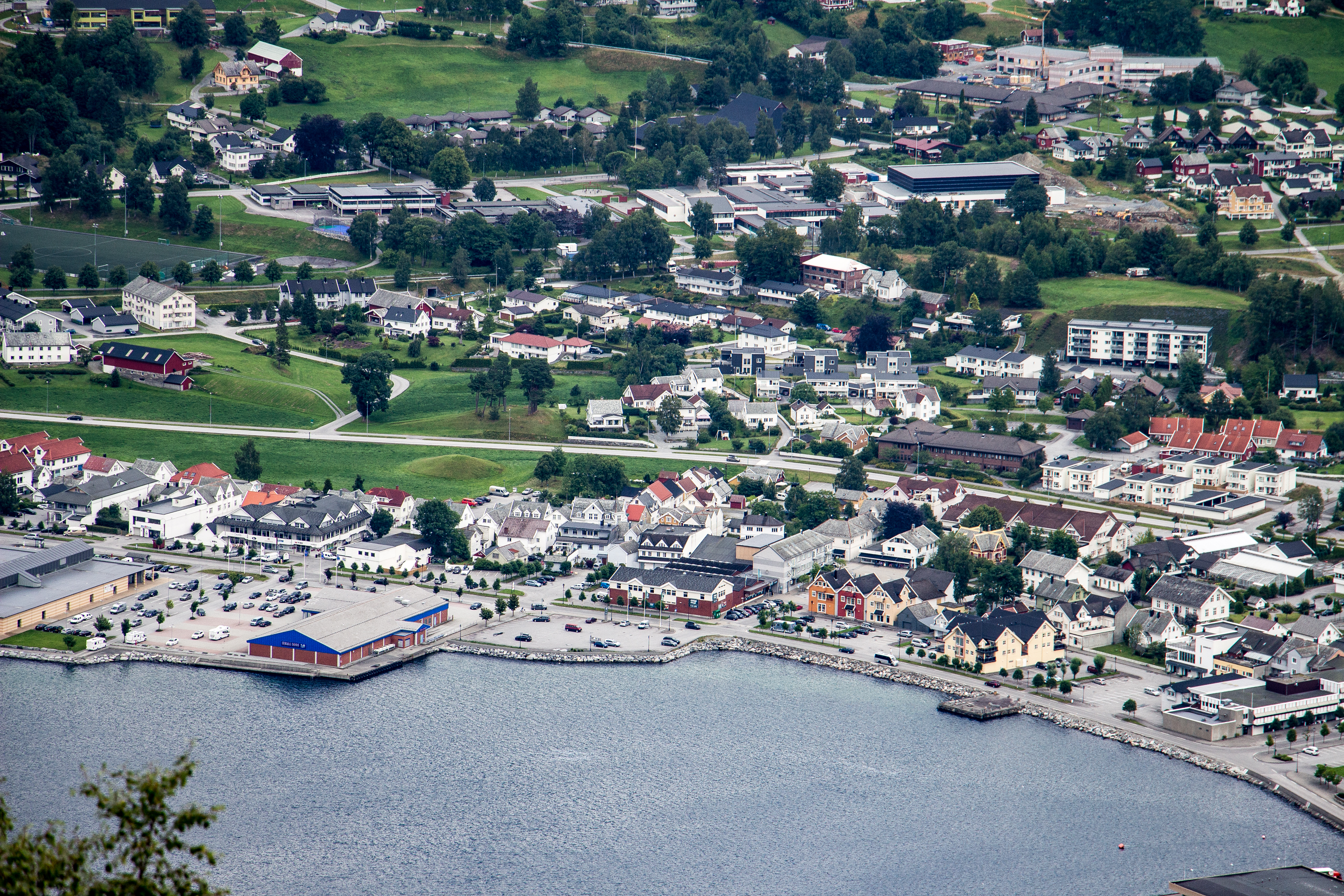
Part of the modern developments of Nordfjordeid

During the 7th century, the farm Myklebust (mykill) was the home of the Viking king, Audbjörn Frøybjørnsson, who ruled the kingdom of Firda (Firðafylkí). Myklebust was the largest farm in Nordfjordeid (Eygis) and the center of power in Firda. Based on archeological evidence it is assumed that Nordfjordeid was the home of a family dynasty that ruled the area for centuries prior. The inhabitants were known as Norðfirðir, and were mainly farmers and merchants. There were archeological finds of Saxon objects that originated from Ireland, thus it is believed that the Vikings of the farm participated in the Great Heathen Army, that conquered eastern Mercia during the 8th century. Nordfjordeid was strategically well placed, with large amounts of land available for agriculture, timber and other natural resources. The residents could easily prepare for incoming attacks as the only way to arrive was through the Eidsfjord, offering many vantage points, allowing early warnings when unknown travelers were spotted. Being close to the coast made travel easy, both north and south in Norway, and also toward England.

==== Death of King Audbjörn ====
Audbjörn was killed during the second battle of Solskjel in 870 against Harald Hairfair. Harald was on a quest to unite Norway under one rule leading to the Unification of Norway. Audbjörn wanted to maintain the current structure of petty kingdoms in Norway, in order to maintain his power. When news arrived that Harald was marching south from Trondheim, with a massive army; Audbjörn and King Arnvid of Sunnmøre gathered an army to defend their territories. A massive battle ensued with many casualties on both sides. Both kings fell during the battle.

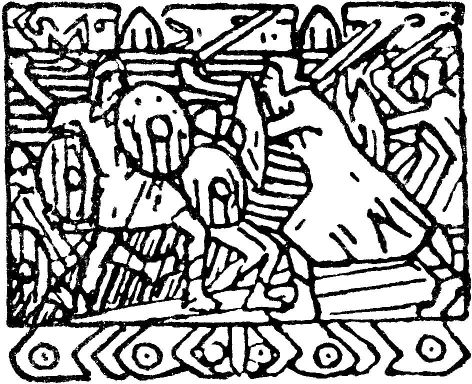
The battle of the Viking Kings

Audbjörn was returned home to Nordfjordeid, and buried in the gravemound known as "Rundehogjen" with the original Myklebust Ship. Excavations of the burial mound in 1864 resulted in the findings of a male skeleton aged approximately 25–35 with shoulder damage resulting from a sword or axe. The age of the ship and skeleton date back to the late 800s, confirming that Audbjörn was buried in the location.

==== Siege of Mørejarl Ragnvald ====
After the death of Audbjörn, his half brother Vemund Kamban became the ruler of Firda by birthright. Vemund rallied the remaining men in preparation for Harald arriving at Stad the next spring. Harald elected not to travel further south during the Autumn due to the challenging conditions in the area.

Instead his ally, Jarl Ragnvald of Møre was instructed to defeat Vemund. He sent spies over the mountains to report of Vemund.

Later the same year, there was a large gathering at the Naustdal farm, 10 km from Nordfjordeid. Vemund and 90 of his men participated in festivities at the farm. There was a large banquet, when Jarl Ragnvald traveled to the farm during the night aware of Vemunds location due to his spies. Ragnvald and his men set fire to the building where all of Vemunds men were sleeping. Killing them all, along with the King. This ended the reign of the Myklebust dynasty, and Harald successfully took control.

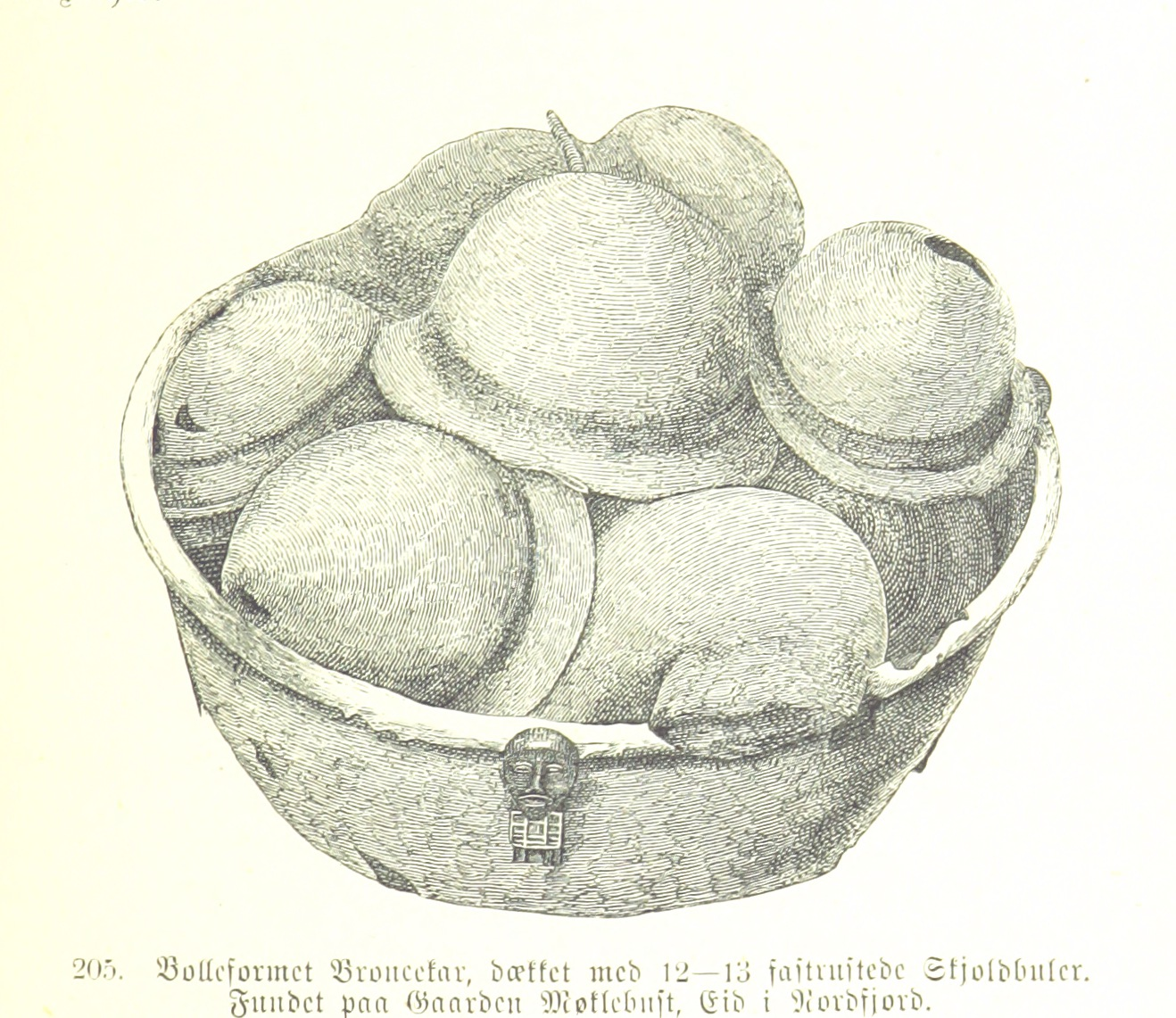
Drawing of a basket of shield bosses found within the Myklebust viking ship in Nordfjordeid

=== Middle ages ===
==== Shift to Christianity ====
During the Middle Ages there was a shift to Christianity. Nordfjordeid was Christianized when King Olav Tryggvason in 997 called a meeting with the peasants of the area. The peasants arrived peacefully, but were met by Olav and his army. The peasants were given the choice of converting to Christianity or death. Faced with overwhelming force, the peasants converted, resulting in Nordfjordeid and surrounding areas becoming Christian.

==== Queen Ingerid Ragnvaldsdotter and the Stodrheim dynasty ====
Árni Ívarsson á Stoðreimi (Arne of Stodrheim) was named Lendmann of Bergenhus Len by the king. Today Stodrheim is known as the village Stårheim.

Arne was the godfather of King Magnus Erlingson (Magnus V of Norway). He married Queen Ingerid Ragnvaldsdotter of Norway around 1140, as her fourth husband. Ingerid received the title Queen Consort as she was previously married to King Harald Gille.

Queen Ingerid settled in Stårheim (Stodrheim) 10 kilometres (6.2 mi) from Nordfjordeid. Arne controlled the entire Western coast of Norway from his home in Stårheim. Ingerid was later murdered in an attack by a rival clan. The Stårheim dynasty continued to be influential throughout the Middle Ages. Bishop Nicholas Arnesson was among the children of Arne and Ingerid.

==== Stave church and burning of the Myklebust farm ====
Around 1000 the first church in Nordfjordeid was erected on the Myklebust farm, on the same grounds the Vikings had their place of worship. This was a stave church, described as well decorated. It was dedicated to Mary Magdalene and named the St. Mary Church. This church at the time acted as the regional administrative center, strengthening the power of the Myklebust farm.

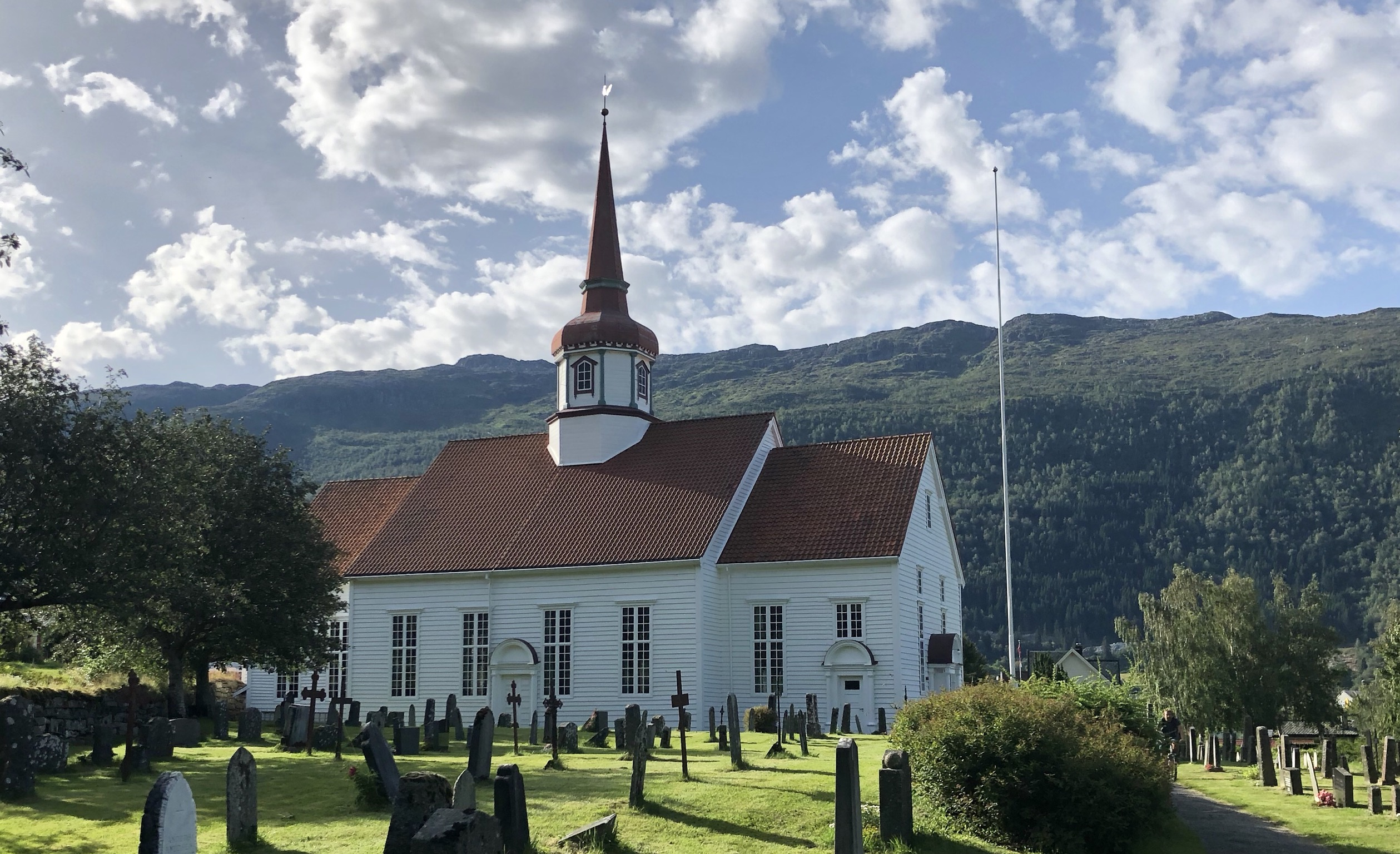
The current Eid Church (Nordfjord)

The church was lost when the entire Myklebust farm burned to the ground in the early 1200s. A new church was erected in the 13th century, in Mel slightly north of Myklebust. During this period the village acted as a harbor, all trade and communication with Bergen to the eastern parts of Nordfjord went through Nordfjordeid.

==== Barons and Bjørgvin ====
During the later Middle Ages the Myklebust farm was part of the Nordfjord Estate. Owned by Baron Audun Hugleiksson. In 1306 the Barons were abolished by the King, who took control over their fiefs and other possessions. In 1361 the King turned over control of the Nordfjord Estate to the Lensherre og Bjørgvin.

=== Military age ===
Nordfjordeid was transformed during the 1600−1800s from a mainly agricultural society to one more focused on trade. The Myklebust farm was during this period owned by the priest Jens Bugge and his heirs. It was gradually split into several smaller farms. By 1863 the Myklebust farm had been divided into a total of eight.

==== Establishment of the Military training grounds ====
In the early 1600s there was established a military training ground in Nordfjordeid, on the Osnes farm. The grounds were used to train soldiers from surrounding areas. The establishment was responsible for training around 300 soldiers annually. During battalion training there could have been up to 1200−1500 soldiers in the area. The soldiers rented private property during training; this had a large positive impact on the local economy, leading to economic growth in the village. In modern times the military training ground is known as Malakoff.

A rock festival called Malakoff Rock Festival is held there annually.

==== Trade boom ====
Tradesmen within areas such as bakers, shoemakers and smiths enjoyed massively increased revenue. This led to the formation of the old street, known as Eidsgata. Filled with shops, and residential buildings. The first trade business is believed to have been established in 1638 on the Gjerde farm.

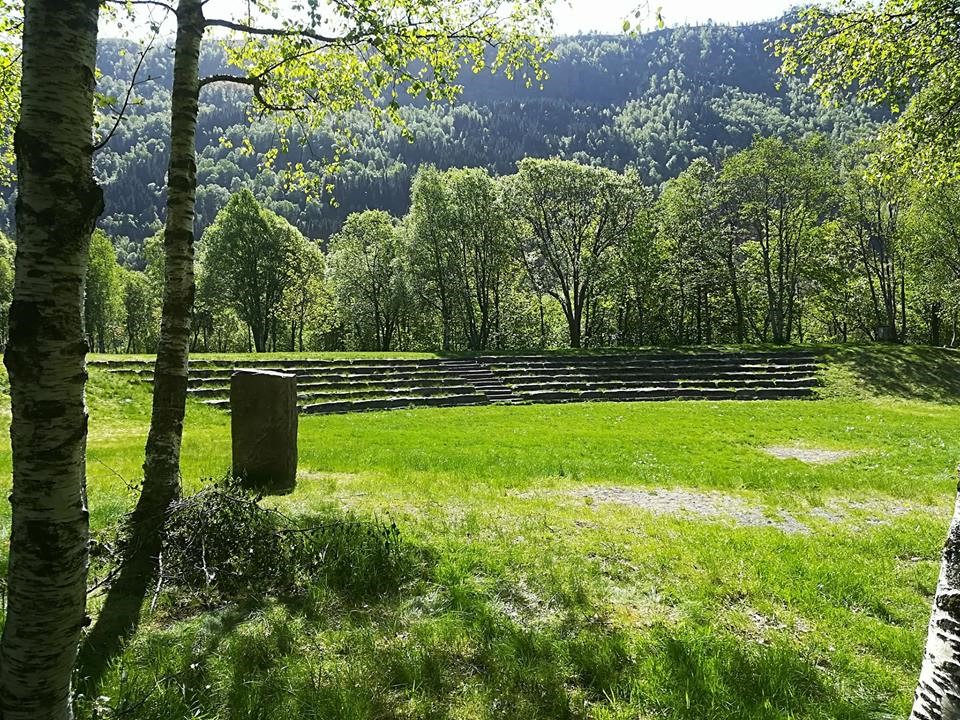
The military training grounds and amfi theatre.

=== World War II ===
Early in the Second World War, in April 1940, a defense battalion of 110 soldiers was stationed at the military training grounds in Nordfjordeid, ordered there by General Steffens as part of the forces mobilized for defence the West Coast from the German invasion. The war for the West Coast ended on 1 May 1940 when Steffens fled north from Sandane when overwhelmed by the invading forces.

==== British escape ====
British soldiers fled to Nordfjordeid through Stryn, by walking over the mountains, attempting to get to the coast after the battles in Gudbrandsdalen. Twenty-nine soldiers were smuggled from Nordfjordeid to the coast where they were saved by British warships.

==== Nazi war school ====
Once the German occupation of Norway was under way, the Germans constructed installations to house up to 1000 soldiers in Nordfjordeid. From 1943 the training grounds at Nordfjordeid became a war school for the Wehrmacht. The school was known as Kampfschule Nordfjordeid. It was a recruit school, and also offered anti-tank courses, skiing courses and educated petty officers.

==== Weapon smuggling ====
The Norwegian resistance movement established an arms smuggling route from the island of Silda to Nordfjordeid. From Norfjordeid the route fed into the eastern parts of Norway. The activity was discovered in 1943, three men from Nordfjordeid were arrested by Gestapo and sent to a Nazi concentration camp.

==== The bombing of Wartheland ====
On 12 December 1944, twenty-three allied aircraft participated in a bombing campaign targeting a German ship convoy stationed close to Nordfjordeid. The convoy consisted of three trade ships and two military escort ships. They were traveling from Ålesund to Bergen.

20 de Havilland DH.98 Mosquito aircraft attacked the convoy. The 4,000-ton Wartheland was hit, capsizing less than 200 meters from the Nordfjordeid shoreline. Three German soldiers were killed in the attack. The wreckage can still be found today in the fjord.

==== Nazi capitulation ====
After the Nazi capitulation in 1945 the remaining German soldiers stationed in Sogn og Fjordane, were all sent to Nordfjordeid, before returning to Germany. The soldiers were forced to build a football field in Nordfjordeid before returning.

== Tourism ==
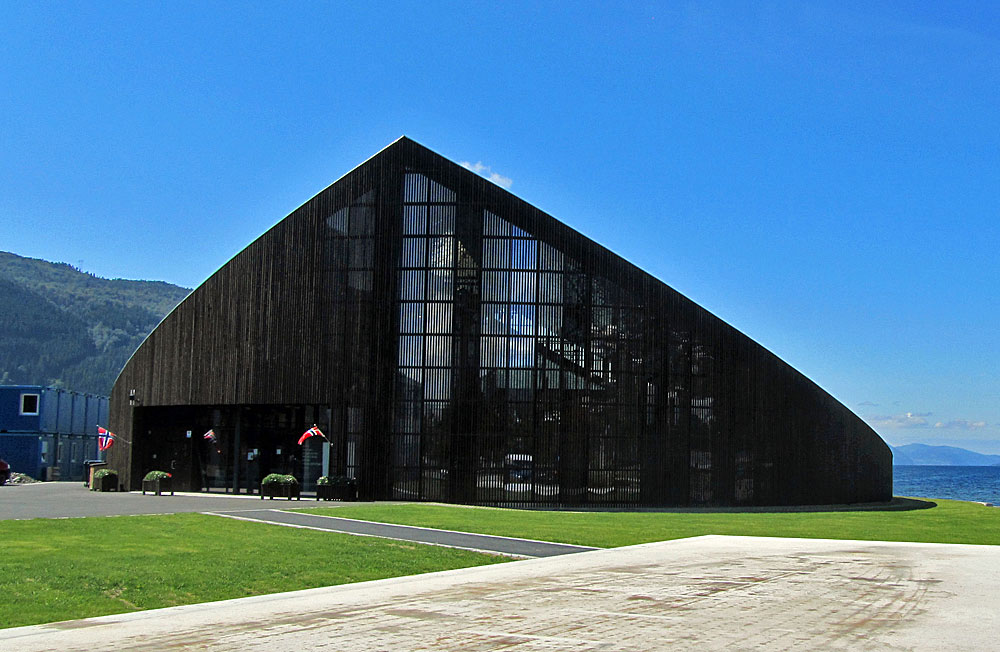
The Sagastad Viking Center

Nordfjordeid is a tourist destination situated in the fjords of western Norway. Hundreds of thousands visit each year. Forbes has highlighted the village as a "must-see".

=== Cruise ===
Since 2019 Nordfjordeid has operated a cruise ship port known as Port of Nordfjordeid. In 2019 it received nineteen ships with 60,000 visitors. After the COVID-19 pandemic the number rose to 57 ships in 2022, and grew to 70 calls in both 2023 and 2024. One of the fastest growths for a port in Europe ever recorded.

The port of Nordfjordeid has a cruise terminal and a SeaWalk. The SeaWalk is 220-metre (720 ft) long and 4.2-metre (14 ft) wide. Floating on eight wave-damping pontoons with a capacity of more than 4,000 passengers per hour it can carry a passenger load of more than 300 metric tons (300 long tons; 330 short tons). SeaWalk consists of three bridges, two link pontoons and the hinged landing section. The bridges are 72-metre (236 ft) long. The walkway is approximately 200 centimetres (79 in) above sea level and the railings are 110 centimetres (43 in) high.

== Attractions ==
There are many tourist attractions in this area. Nordfjordeid has a rich Viking history and military history. The fjords and mountains offer attractive views to visitors. In addition due to its location visitors can easily travel to other top destinations on the Vestland (West Coast), such as the West Cape, and world heritage fjords such as Geiranger.

=== Sophus Lie Conference Center ===
Nordfjordeid is the location of the Sophus Lie Conference Center for mathematics. Notable mathematician Sophus Lie was born in the village in 1842.

=== Norwegian Fjordhorse Center ===
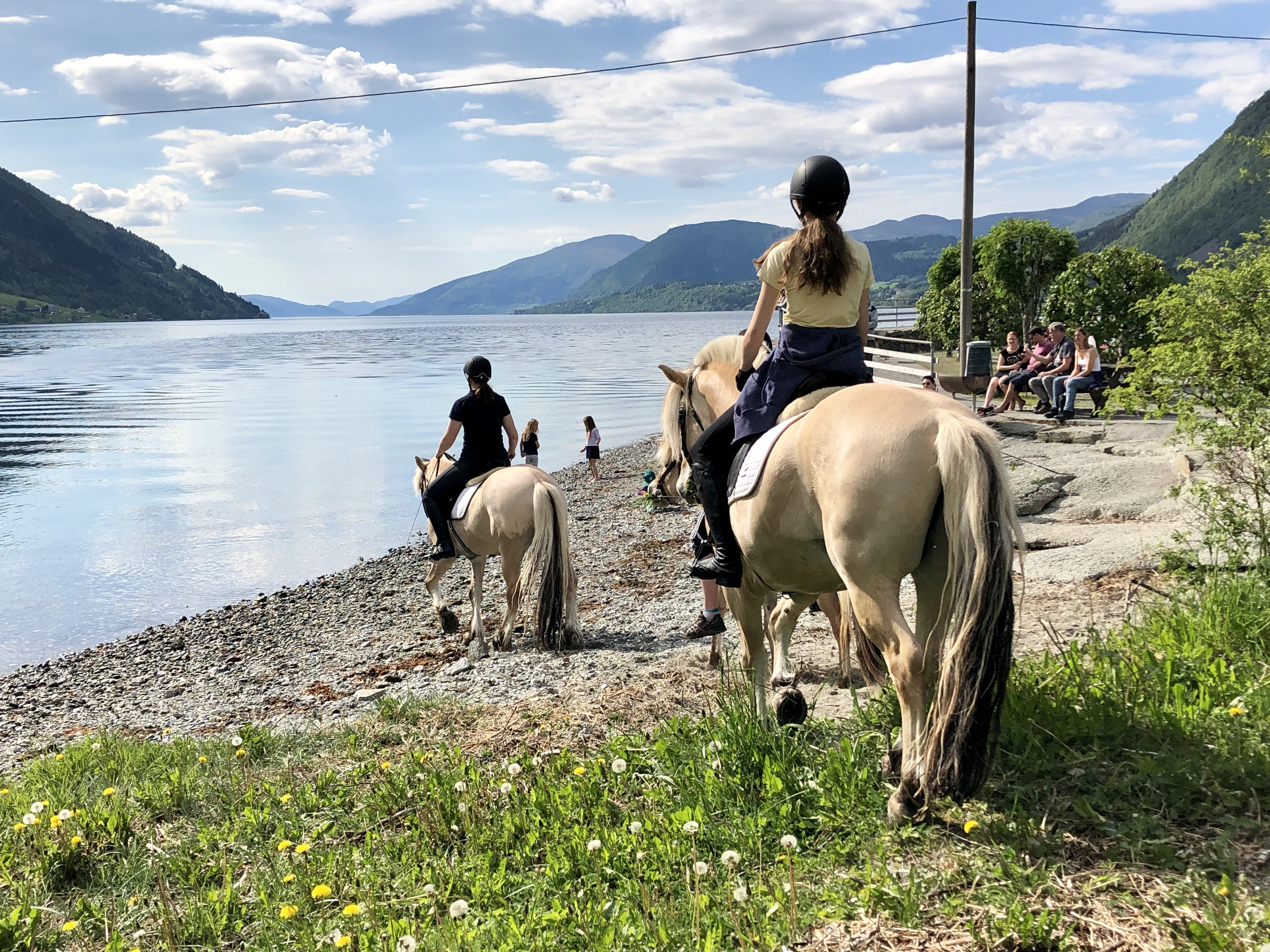
Fjord Horses by the fjord in Nordfjordeid

The Norwegian Fjordhorse Center is a national resource centre for Norway's national symbol: the Fjord horse, located in Nordfjordeid. Nordfjordeid is known as "the Mecca of the Fjord Horse". The reason for this is historic, because the village is famous for its long-standing horse traditions. Stallion shows have been held in the village since 1886. Today, the village has an active community of Fjord horse owners and breeders. It is in this environment steeped in tradition that the Norwegian Fjord Horse Centre is based, and it is not uncommon to meet Fjord horses on the local roads. The Norwegian Fjord Horse Centre is a resource centre for the Fjord horse and runs an information and advice service for all matters relating to this all-Norwegian horse breed. One of the centre's main functions is to promote the breeding and use of the Fjord horse. Many courses are held at the centre throughout the year, and Fjordane Folk High School's horse programmes use the premises for teaching activities.

=== Nordfjord Golf Park ===
The Nordfjord Golf park is a 9-hole golf course located along the Eid river (Eidselva). The course is considered by many to be one of the best golf courses in Western Norway. It is administrated by the local Nordfjord Golf Club.

=== Museums ===
==== Sagastad Viking Center ====
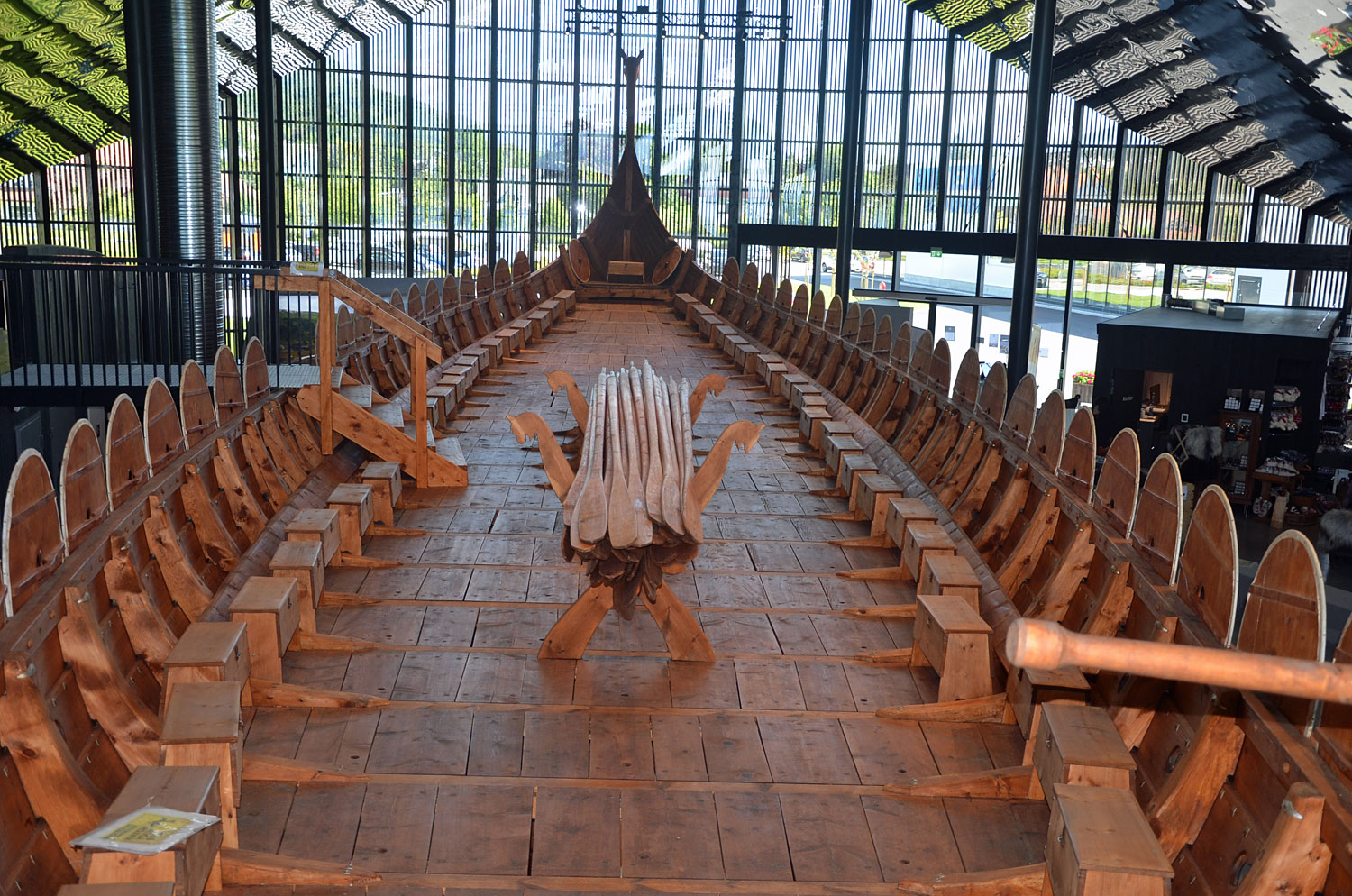
The Myklebust ship deck, as seen from inside the Sagastad museum.

The most visited attraction in Nordfjordeid is the Sagastad Viking Center, a museum that houses a replica of the largest viking longship ever discovered in Norway, the Myklebust Ship.

The content in the exhibition is anchored in research in collaboration with the University of Bergen and the Medieval Cluster. The ship is located in the middle of the center, surrounded by interactive exhibitions that are mainly related to the ship and the other grave finds in Nordfjordeid. The center opened May 10, 2019, and has year-round operations with opportunities for parties, concerts, lectures and other events.

The building is located near the fjord, with a slipway allowing for sea launching of the ship. In 2019 the center had over 20,000 visitors, during the COVID-19 pandemic it was partially closed, receiving only 8000 guests in 2020, and 9000 in 2021.

The building is also used as a cultural center, hosting concerts and other cultural events. The architectural design of the building with one giant room, and a polished aluminum roof results in unique acoustics. The ship building technique used by the boatbuilders to construct the Myklebustship is now listed under UNESCO world heritage. The Myklebust ship is believed to have belonged to King Audbjørn of Firda.

=== Nature ===
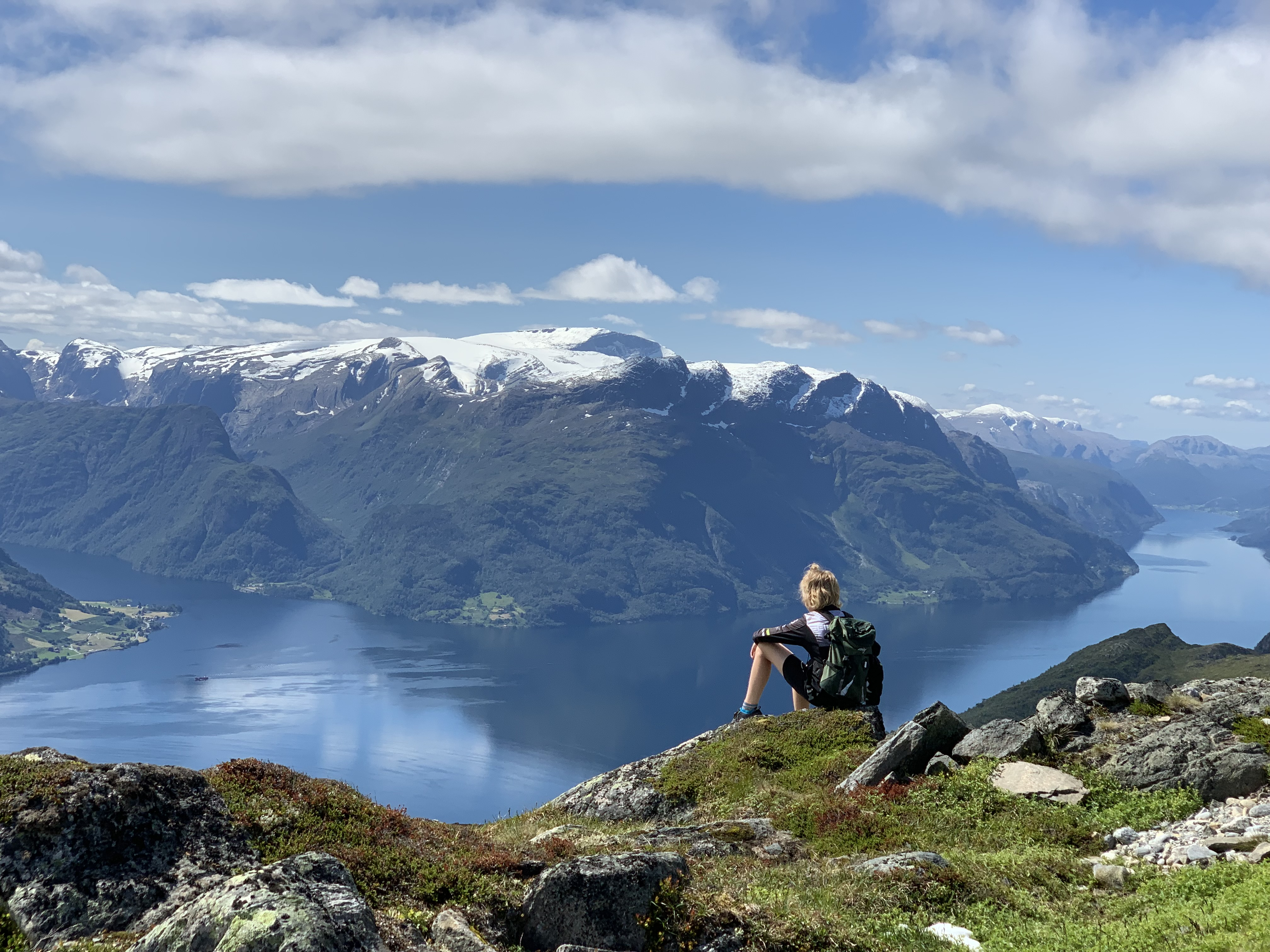
View from Sagatindene

Geirangerfjord and the Briksdalen glacier are located near Nordfjordeid. Several marked hiking trails originate near the village center. Mountain trails extend both north and south of the village; a trail starting near the Lote Tunnel leads south to a viewpoint 900 metres (3,000 ft) above the Nordfjorden.

==== Harpefossen ski resort ====
Harpefossen Ski Resort is situated in the Hjelmeland valley, 10 kilometres (6.2 mi) from the center of Nordfjordeid. Harpefossen is the largest, most complete resort in the county, offering slopes of some 550 metres (1,800 ft), starting at 300 m (980 ft) above sea level. Harpefossen's varied terrain is well known nationally, and its geographical position ensures regular powder snowfall throughout the season. There are seven ski lifts, thirteen well-groomed trails, 15 kilometres (9.3 mi) of pathways for cross country and a trail network running through five idyllic mountain summer farms. A separate biathlon arena forms part of the cross-country trails, and both resorts and the cross-country trails are floodlit ensuring good evening visibility.

==== Gravemound ====
Located next to the old street, where the shoreline used to be, lies a burial mound known as Rundehogjen. It is the burial site of the Viking King Audbjørn of Firda. This is where the largest viking long ship ever discovered was unearthed: the Myklebust Ship. The gravemound is located on the Myklebust farm, the oldest establishment in Nordfjordeid.

Excavation was carried out in 1864 by Anders Lorange, however half the mound still remains unexplored. Today it is possible to visit the mound, and even walk on it.

==== Eid river ====
Spanning over 10 kilometres (6.2 mi) the Eid (Eidselva) is a river that flows through Nordfjordeid. It has its outlet from the Hornindalsvatnet and extends down to the Eidfjorden in Nordfjordeid. The river is famous for its salmon fishing, the largest salmon ever caught in the river was 27.6 kilograms (61 lb). It was caught by Martin Hjelle in 1944. The fishing season is from June to the end of August. The river is listed as a national salmon river by the Norwegian government. This offers it special protection against harmful interventions and activities in the watercourses and against aquaculture and pollution.

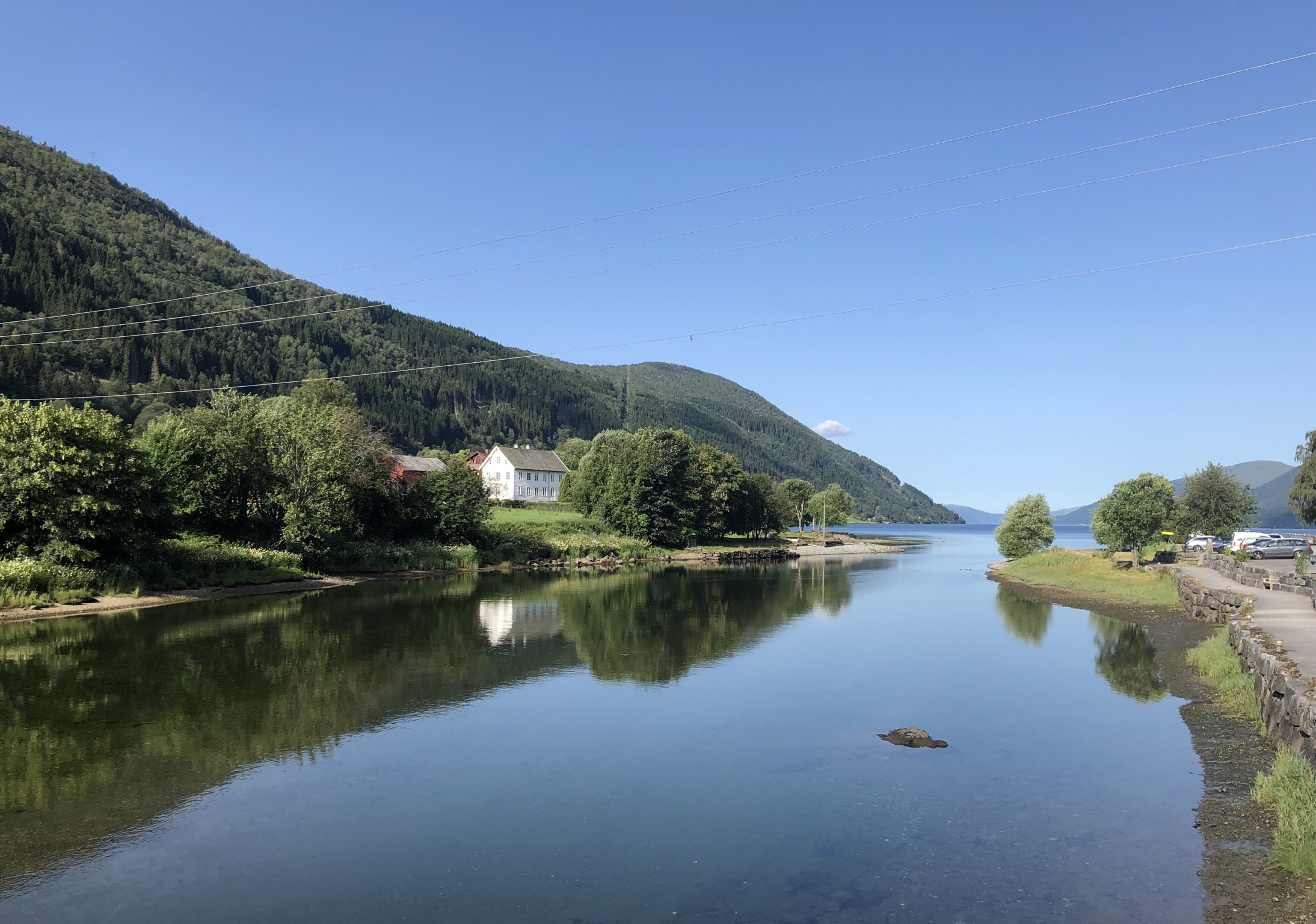
Eidselva

The Eidselva has a total length of 58.5 kilometres (36.4 mi) including Horndøla and Terdøla. The average water flow is 25.99 cubic metres per second (918 cu ft/s). The watercourse is affected by watercourse regulation in that 5 percent or 20 km^{2} (7.7 sq mi) of the high-lying field to Horndøla is laid in pipes. The precipitation field is 428.48 m^{2} (4,612.1 sq ft).

There are traces of human activity along the river dating back to the Viking Age. It is believed to have been used for timber transport and access to water, for drinking and cleaning. During the military age of Nordfjordeid, the river was used by woman to clean the clothes of soldiers in the area known as Jektehola. The river was central in the development of the docks.

=== Festivals ===
Malakoff Rockfestival is an annual music festival, with a primary focus on rock music. It is held in Nordfjordeid. The festival has developed considerably since its debut in 2003. Both national and international artists appear in featured lineups. The festival is hosted on the old military training grounds, using the old amfi theatre for its secondary stage, while the main stage used for headliners is located to the south of the grounds.

The festival attracts over 30,000 attendees, and lasts for three days.

Artists such as Ylvis, Oselie, The School, Bertine Zetlitz, Marit Larsen, Lukestar, Jim Stärk, Animal Alpha, Åge Aleksandersen, Eye Emma Jedi, Svelekameratane, and Turbonegro have performed.

=== Theatre and culture ===
==== The Opera House ====
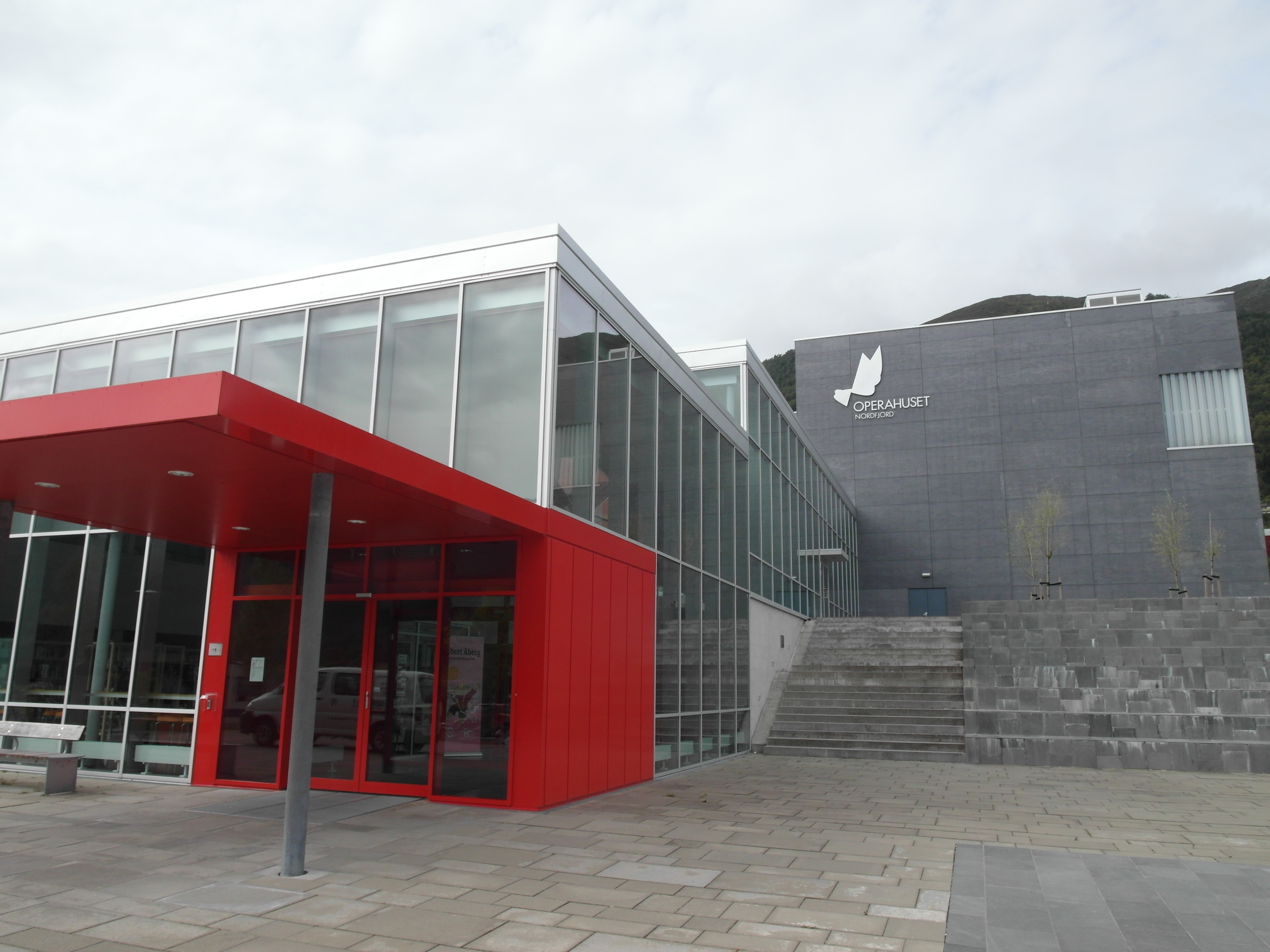
The Operahouse in Nordfjordeid

In 2009 Nordfjordeid became the location of Operahuset Nordfjord, the second opera house in Norway. The building was opened on 1 March 2019, by the then minister of Culture from the Labour Party, Trond Giske.

The building also houses a cinema, and a library and is connected to the local upper secondary school. The main stage is 14-metre (46 ft) wide, and 10 m (33 ft) deep, with a capacity of 530 seats. Of these, 218 seats are located in the gallery. When the orchestra pit is in use, capacity is 484. The chamber is specially constructed and adapted for acoustic music, using the same techniques as found in the Oslo Opera House.

The local opera company known as Opera Nordfjord has annual productions in the building. Both opera and operetta are produced, alongside family productions such as musicals and ballet productions. The productions are a hybrid of professional soloists in cooperation with the local amateur choir.

==== Opera Nordfjord ====
The initiative for opera in a remote place with only 3,000 inhabitants is owed to Kari Standal Pavelich who organises the productions and also founded the Nordfjord Opera Company. She plays the violin in the orchestra, her husband Michael conducts. Vakre kostymer - Hoffmanns Eventyr | Fantastiske kostymer - Hoffmanns Eventyr. Sjå intervju med Kari Standal Pavelich frå kostymelageret til Opera Nordfjord | By Opera Nordfjord | Facebook A 2016 performance of Jacques Offenbach's Tales of Hoffmann was reviewed in a German opera blog.

In 2018 Kari and Michael Pavelich were awarded a royal distinction, the King's Medal of Merit for their 20 years of work and commitment connected to Opera and culture in Nordfjordeid. Kongens Fortjenstmedalje til operaektepar

In addition to Opera, the main stage is also used for concerts in other genres, stand-up comedy, monologues, conferences and also the annual school musicals, produced by the local upper secondary school.

==== Eidsgata ====
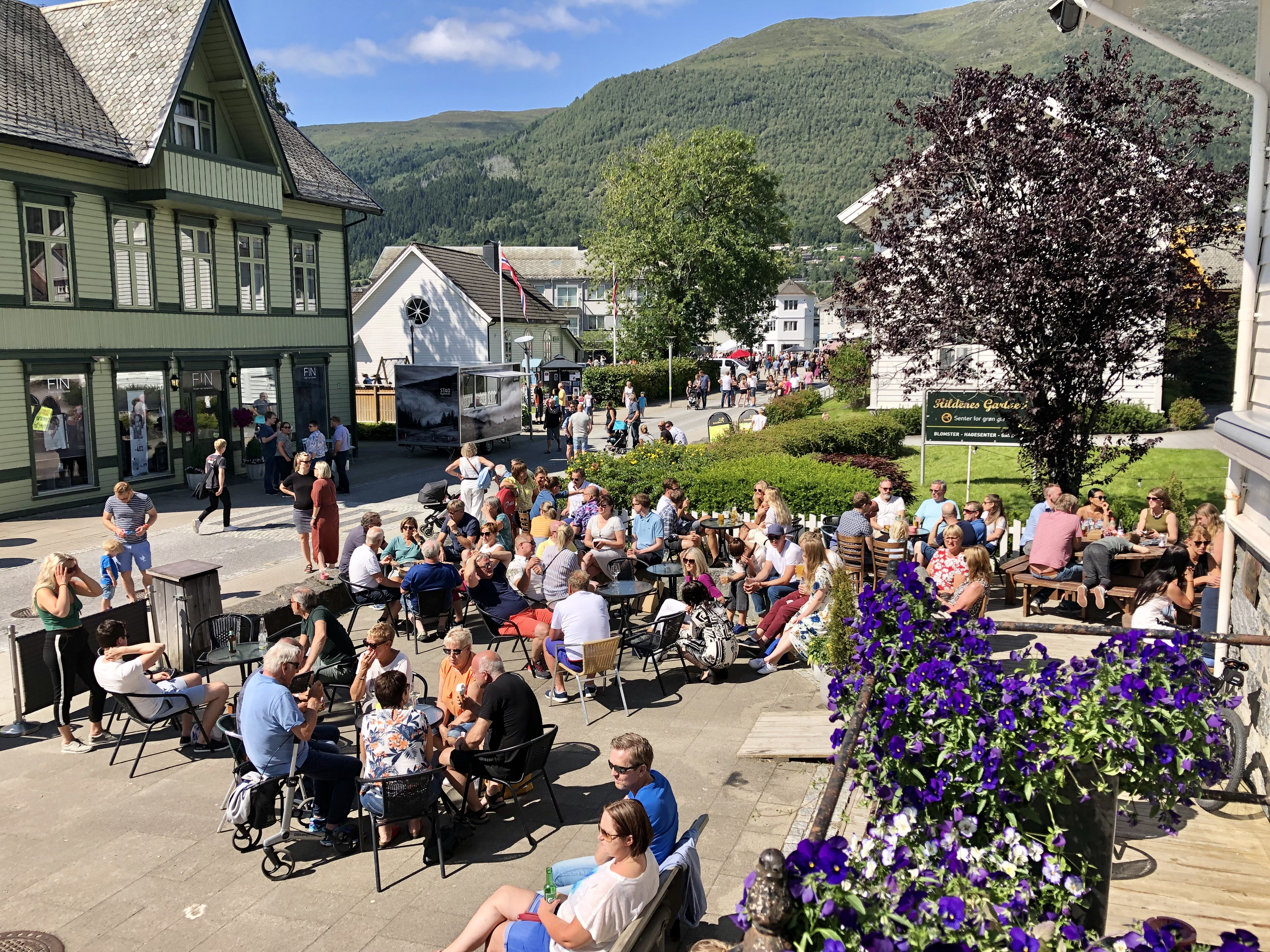
Eidsgata during the summer

The old street known as Eidsgata is a collection of old protected wooden buildings from 1700 and 1800. The street is a popular tourist attraction and also houses different shops, cafés and other local offerings.

==== The Old Bank ====
The old bank building (Gamlebanken) was built in 1882 by the bank Nordfjord Sparebank. The building remained a bank until 1961 when it was repurposed as a library. In 1997 the bank was repurposed as a cultural building used for art exhibitions and cultural events. Today the building houses a tourist information and has several art exhibitions and events throughout the year. The building is a central part of the old street Eidsgata.

=== Yris Hotel ===
An historic protected cultural heritage property from the 1790. Originally a trading post and later a hotel.

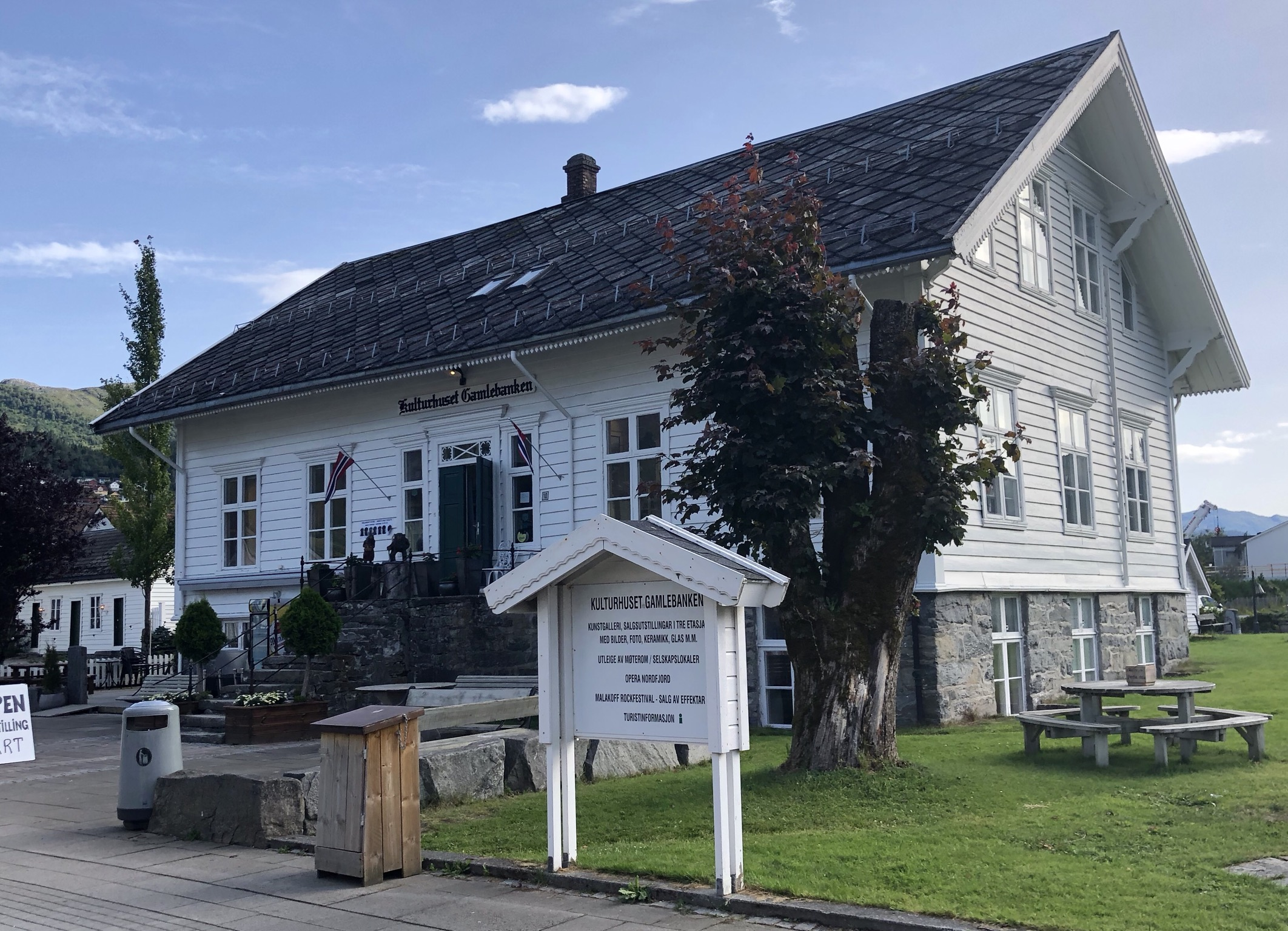
The old bank

==== Gymmen ====
Situated next to the Opera House, the Gymmen building is used as a stage and recording studio. It houses many concerts throughout the year. Local bands use the building for recording and practice, and there are club nights, conferences and offerings for local youth. The main stage can host up to 250 standing guests, or 150 in a seated arrangement.

== See also ==
- Eidsgata
- Kulturhuset Gamlebanken
- Operahuset Nordfjord
- Sagastad
- Port of Nordfjordeid
- Eksersisplassen
- Myklebust Burial Mound
- Stad Municipality
