= Myklebust Burial Mound =

Viking burial mound in Nordfjordeid

- Rundehogjen / Lisjeskjoratippen
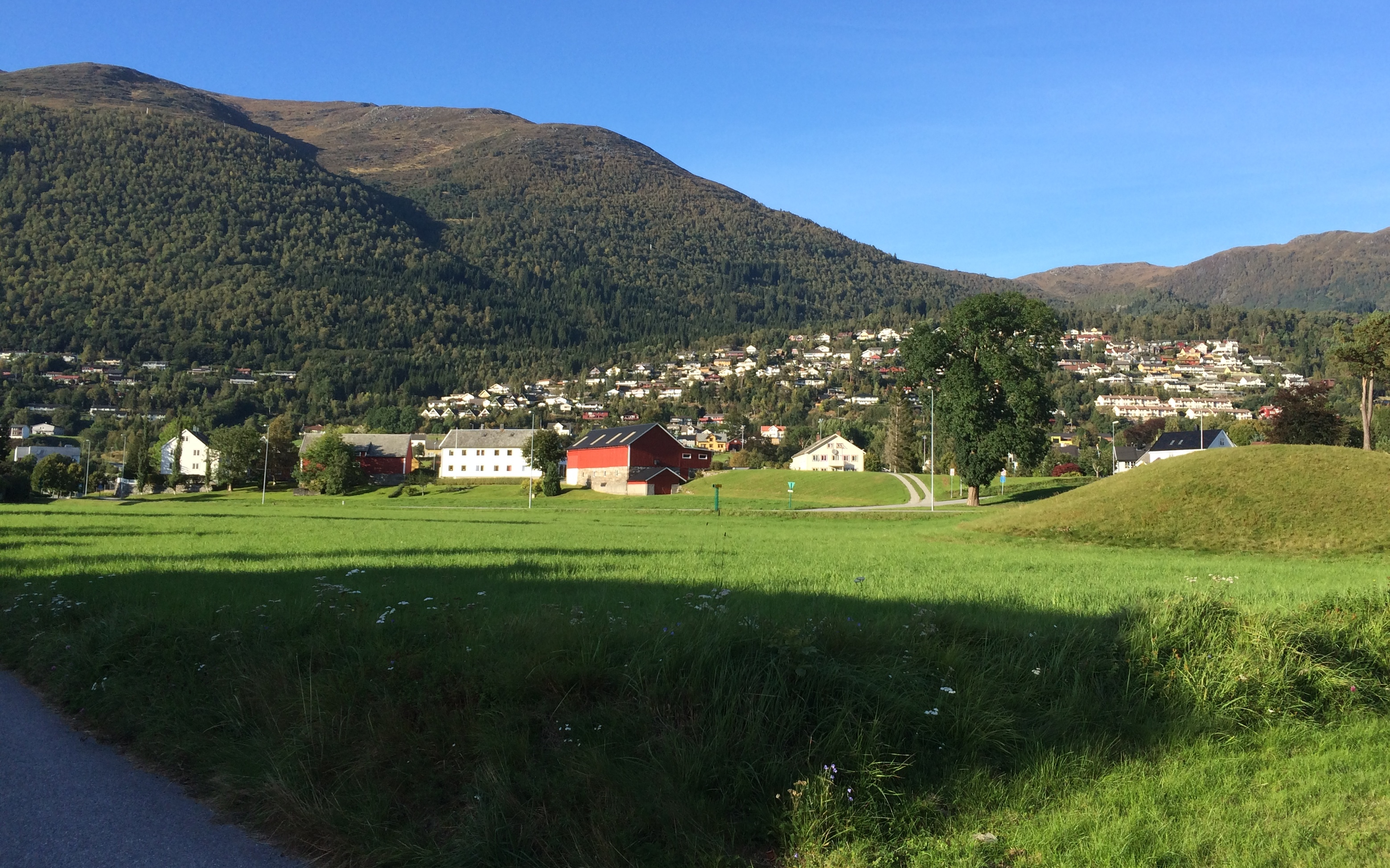
- Myklebust Burial Mound (on the right)
- Interactive map of Myklebust Burial Mound
- Coordinates: 61.909265°N 5.988542°E
- Width: 30 meters
- Completion date: Mid 9th century

The Myklebust burial mound also known locally as Rundehogjen or Lisje Skjoratippen (Norwegian: Nynorsk) or simply Mound 1 is a burial mound from the Viking age. It is located on the Myklebust Farm in Nordfjordeid in Norway. The mound is one of the seven major Viking burial mounds in Norway, of which it is the only cremation grave.

The mound was where the remains of the Myklebust ship was discovered; Possibly the largest Viking ship in the world. It is assumed to have been the final resting place of King Audbjørn of Firda.

== Etymology ==
The name Myklebust comes from the old Norse mikill meaning large, and bólstadr meaning farm. This name can be found several places in Norway and usually refers to the largest farm in a given area. The Myklebust farm in Nordfjordeid was the largest in the region, and is assumed to have been the seat of power.

The modern name Myklebust is an evolution of the older Myklebostad.

== Location ==
The Myklebust mound is located on the Myklebust farm in Nordfjordeid. The mound can be found in the town centre, west of the Eidsgata street.

It is surrounded by a field that has been used primarily for grazing. The field has been scanned by ground-penetrating radar showing evidence of a large farm with several structures and production establishments from the Viking age. There was a total of 5 mounds on the farm, only two remain today.

The mound is approximately 250 meters north of the Sagastad Viking Center that houses a reconstruction of the Myklebust ship and an exhibition on the finds on the Myklebust farm.

== Features ==
The mound was about 30 meters in diameter and 4 meters high.

Around the foot of the mound there had been a 1 meter deep and almost 4 meter wide ditch. It is believed that it had originally been "considerably larger". This circular ditch also had two "bridges" to the surrounding field, one to the south and one to the east.

At the bottom of the mound there was a thick oval layer of charcoal that extended all the way to the ditch at both ends.

== Excavations ==
The mound has been excavated twice. The original excavation was performed in 1874 by Anders Lorange. In 2024 a second excavation was performed by the University of Bergen in cooperation with the Norwegian Directorate for Cultural Heritage in preparation for a possible nomination as a UNESCO World Heritage site.

The nomination was recommended by Directorate in December 2025 and is now awaiting cabinet approval.

=== Original excavation in 1874 ===
In 1874, farmer Johannes Myklebust in Nordfjordeid contacted Bergen Museum about a discovery he had made in one of the large burial mounds on his farm.

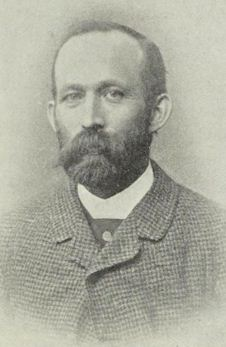
Anders Lorange the original excavator

Anders Lorange was the first archaeologist at the University of Bergen and museum curator. Lorange travelled to Nordfjordeid in 1874 to investigate the Myklebust mound. He dug a trench into the mound, covering roughly 1/4 of the total volume.

Lorange found a massive layer of coal assumed to be the remains of a Viking long ship. There was two layers of ash, Lorange assumed this was due to the ends of the ship collapsing and then being moved onto the rest of the ship. He then found around 750 iron ship rivets and nails. The length of the nails confirmed that the ship was of a formidable size. Much larger than Gokstad and Oseberg.

In addition Lorange found a total of 44 shield bosses. The number of bosses was taken as further evidence of the large size of the ship, as they give an indication of the number of rowers on the ship. The ship was named the Myklebust ship after the farm where the mound is located.

In addition Lorange found an enamelled bronze vessel. The vessel contained the skeleton of a male between 30 and 35 years of age. On top of the bowl there was 12 further shield bosses that covered it. It is assumed that the 12 shield bosses belonged to the kings Hird.

In addition to this Lorange found a large amount of further items, ranging from swords, long bows and spears to glass beads, combs, tools and animal remains. In total this was one of the richest grave finds in Norway to date.

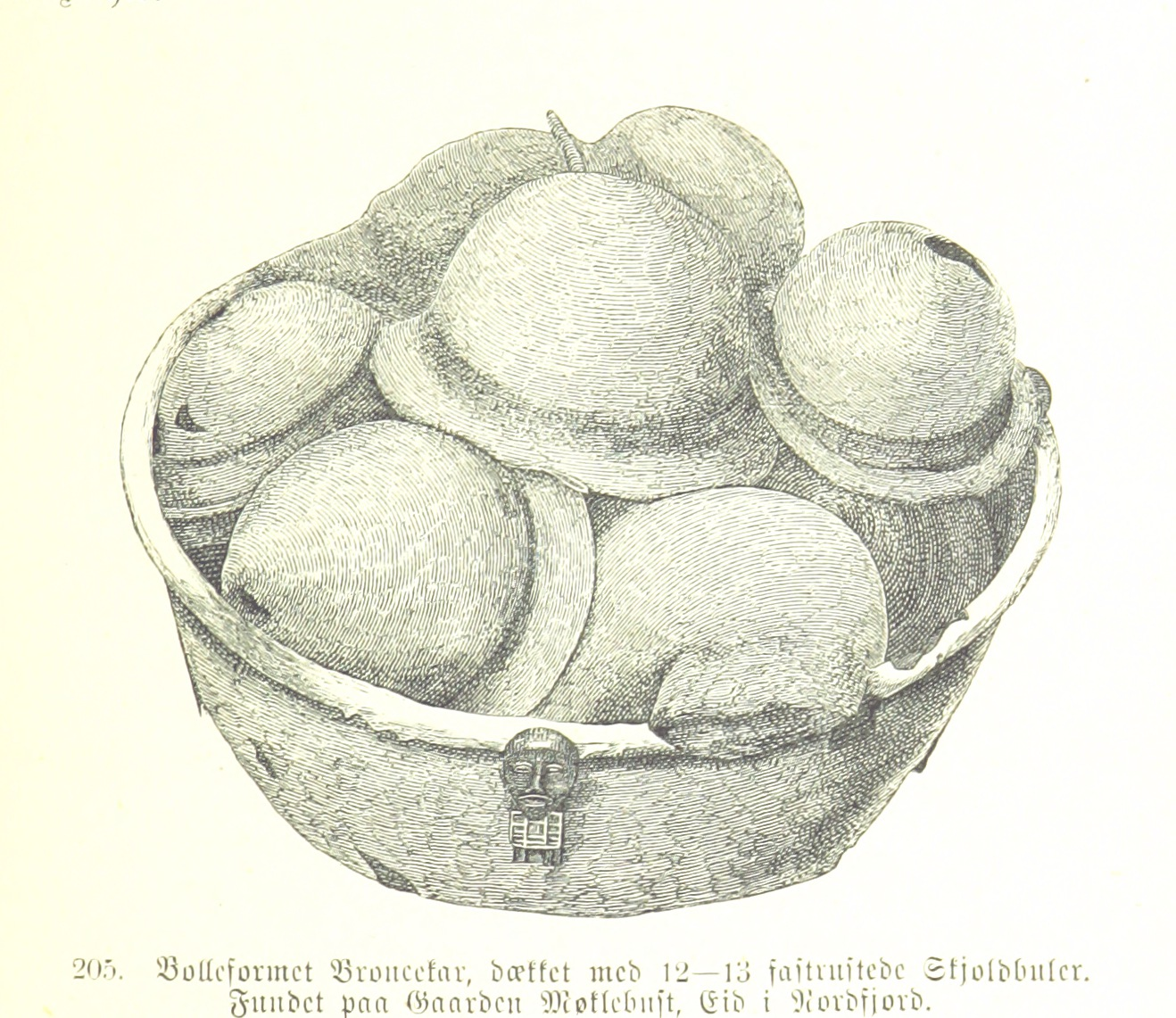
The shield broches covering the bronze bowl

Once the excavation was completed Lorange refilled the mound leaving it as close to the original as possible. During the second excavation in 2024 the archaeologists discovered that Lorange had left a glass bottle with a letter for future archaeologists.

It is speculated that the man buried here is King Audbjørn of Firda. Audbjørn lived during the mid 9th century, concurrent with the dating of the artefacts. He is mentioned in Snorri's Saga on Harald Fairhair. According to the sagas Audbjørn fell during the Second battle of Solskjel in 870.

The evidence in the grave confirms it is a cremation grave for someone of great importance. Many parallels can be drawn to the burial customs of the Volga Vikings described by Ahmad ibn Fadlan in the 10th century. As there is no other named person with the status required for such a ritual, and that the Myklebust farm was of great importance in Firda one can conclude that it is highly likely the burial of Audbjørn.

=== Second excavation in 2024 ===
In April 2024 the Director General of the Norwegian Directorate for Cultural Heritage announced that they would begin surveying whether Norway's Viking Age burial mounds should be placed on Norway's tentative list for UNESCO World Heritage.

The Myklebust mound was pointed out as one of the seven great mounds in Norway that were appropriate for such a nomination. As the excavation from 1874 was lacking it was decided that a new excavation would be performed. The first opening of a ship burial in over 100 years in Norway. The dig was started exactly 150 years after Lorange's excavation.

The excavation was performed during October 2024. The dig followed Lorange's original trench although a slightly larger area was surveyed. The archaeologists from the University of Bergen in cooperation with the University of Stavanger made several new discoveries. Among the discoveries was an additional 600 ship rivets, 4 shield bosses, a bronze ring of Keltic origin and a glass bottle containing a message from Anders Lorange himself.

Before opening the mound a survey was performed by ground-penetrating radar. The radar scans highlighted an area on the mound that was different to the rest, this was assumed to be the original trench. Once dig began this was confirmed to be correct.

After surveying the dig for a week the mound was closed, and reconstructed to its original form.

==== Ground-penetrating radar survey ====
The survey indicated a Viking village was located directly north of the mound. In total the radar and metal detector survey indicated potentially upwards of 8000 unique artefacts.

== See also ==
- Myklebust ship
- Sagastad
- Nordfjordeid
- Audbjörn Frøybjørnsson
