= Kjell A. Storeide =

Norwegian businessperson (born 1952)

Kjell Arvid Storeide (born 1952) is a Norwegian businessperson.

He was the CEO of Stokke Gruppen from 1990 to 2004. He is the chairman of the board of Innovation Norway and Rem Offshore, and a member of the board of Aker ASA, Salmar ASA and Investinor (formerly known as Statens Investeringsselskap). He is a former member of the board of the Norwegian Industrial and Regional Development Fund, SND Invest, the Confederation of Norwegian Enterprise, the Federation of Norwegian Manufacturing Industries, and the Norwegian Food Research Institute (Matforsk).

When Storeide was appointed chairman of the board of Innovation Norway in 2006, this was criticized by the political opposition. Conservative politician Børge Brende cited that companies in which Storeide was an owner or board member had received NOK 35 million from Innovation Norway over the past two years.

Storeide hails from Stranda Municipality, and lives in Ålesund Municipality.
