= Audbjörn Frøybjørnsson =

9th century petty Viking king

- King of Firda Auðbjörn Frøðbjörnsson
- Reign: Until c. 870
- Successor: Vemund Kamban (as half-brother)
- Born: c. 840
- Died: c. 870; Solskjel, Nordmøre
- Cause of death: Killed in battle (Second Battle of Solskjel)
- Burial: Myklebust Burial Mound, Nordfjordeid
Names
- Audbjörn Frøybjørnsson
- House: Myklebust dynasty
- Father: Frøybjørn
- Religion: Old Norse religion

Audbjörn Frøybjørnsson (Norwegian: Audbjørn Frøbjørnsson) was the King of the Kingdom of Firda (Norse: Firðafylkí). One of the petty kingdoms of Norway during the Viking age. He lived approximately between 840 and 870.

Audbjörn was killed during the second battle of Solskjel in 870 defending against Harald Fairhair. Harald was on a conquest to unite Norway under one rule leading to the Unification of Norway. Audbjörn wanted to maintain the current structure of petty kingdoms in Norway, in order to maintain his power. When news arrived that Harald was marching south from Trondheim, with a massive army; Audbjörn and King Arnvid of Sunnmøre gathered an army to defend their territories. A massive battle ensued with large casualties on both sides, both Kings fell during the battle.

Audbjörn was returned home to Nordfjordeid, and buried in the Myklebust Burial mound locally known as "Rundehogjen" with the original Myklebust ship.
