= Second battle of Solskjel =

9th-century battle in Norway

Second battle of Solskjell
- Part of unification of Norway
Date	c. 870
Location	Solskjell, Nordmøre
Result	Vestfold victory

Belligerents
Kingdom of Vestfold	Kingdom of Sunnmøre; Kingdom of Firda

Commanders and leaders
Harald Fairhair	Arnvid †; Audbjorn †

The second battle of Solskjell was an engagement in Harald Fairhair's conquest of Norway.

After the First Battle of Solskjel, Solve Klove, son of Huntiof, King of Nordmøre, set himself up as a pirate and spent that winter raiding and plundering King Harald's men and possessions on the Møre coast. King Harald himself had left to spend the winter in Trondheim. Solve had also spent time at the court of King Arnvid of Sunnmøre, and they had gathered together a large group of people who had been dispossessed by Harald's conquest.

The following summer Harald again gathered an army and sailed south. On hearing news of Harald's intentions' Solve traveled to King Audbjorn in Firda and convinced him to join forces against Harald. The force sailed north to meet Harald by Solskjel. Here both kings Arnvid and Audbjorn fell, but Solve again escaped. Heimskringla tells that Harald's men, Asgaut and Asbjorn as well as Grjotgard and Herlaug, the sons of earl Håkon Grjotgardsson, were all killed in battle. Solve subsequently resumed his pirate raids and caused much trouble to Harald in several years after. King Harald took possession of Sunnmøre and made Rognvald Eysteinsson the founding jarl of the Jarls of Møre.

== See also ==
- First battle of Solskjel
- Glymdrápa

== Primary source ==
- Sturluson, Snorri. Heimskringla: History of the Kings of Norway, translated Lee M. Hollander. Reprinted University of Texas Press, Austin, 1992. ISBN 0-292-73061-6

== Other sources ==
- Finlay, Alison (editor and translator) Fagrskinna, a Catalogue of the Kings of Norway (Brill Academic. 2004) ISBN 90-04-13172-8
- Hermannsson, Halldór (2009) Bibliography of the sagas of the kings of Norway (BiblioBazaar) ISBN 978-1113624611
- Jones, Gwyn (1984) A History of the Vikings (Oxford University Press. 2nd ed) ISBN 0-19-285139-X.

== Related reading ==
(In Norwegian)

- Krag, Claus (2000) Norges historie fram til 1319 (Universitetsforlaget) ISBN 978-8200129387
