= Myklebust Ship =

Viking ship found in Norway

The Myklebust ship
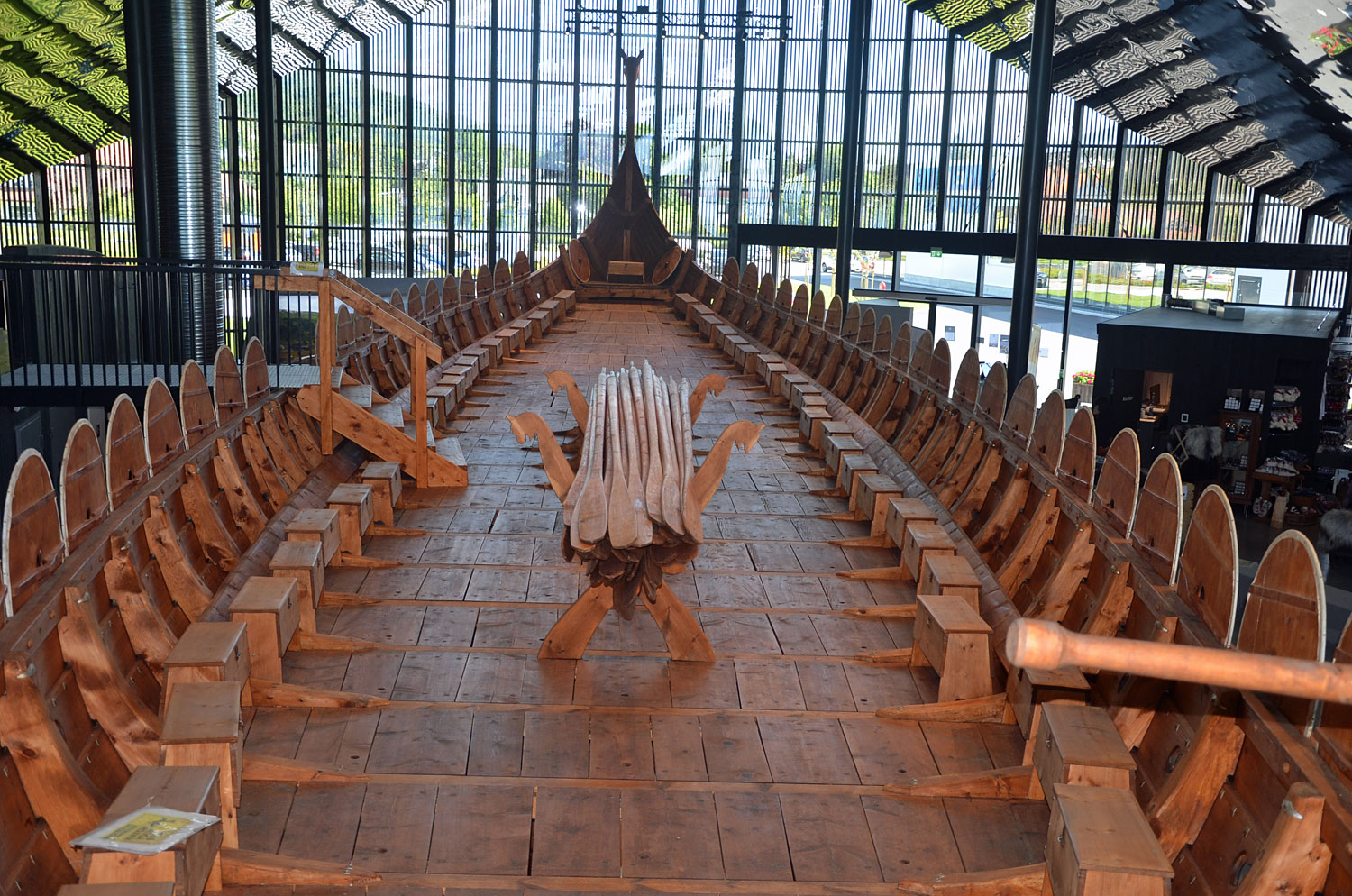
- The deck of the Myklebust ship as seen inside Sagastad
- Callsign: LGOJ
- Estimated length: 30 meters
- Found: 1864 in Nordfjordeid in the Myklebust Burial Mound on the Myklebust farm
- Construction: Bjørkedalsbåt AS
- Belonged to: Audbjörn Frøybjørnsson
- Estimated width: 6 meters

The Myklebust Ship (Norwegian: Myklebustskipet) is the remains of a burned Viking ship that was found in the Myklebust Burial Mound on the farm Myklebust in Nordfjordeid, Norway. In terms of total volume the Myklebust ship is the largest Viking ship that has been discovered in the world to date – 30 m long, 6 m wide. Roskilde 6 however is longer at 37 meters, but only 3.5 m wide.

The Myklebust is the only known cremation grave in Scandinavia.

== Excavation ==
The archaeologist Anders Lorange traveled to Nordfjordeid from Bergen in 1874 to investigate the large burial mound locally called “Rundehågjen” or “Lisje Skjoratippen”. The mound stands on the Myklebust farm, a farm which used to house 5 burial mounds, and is believed to have been the home of a Viking Dynasty, led by among others the Viking King Audbjørn Frøybjørnson of the Firda Kingdom.

The mound was approximately 30 meters in diameter, and almost 4 meters tall. It also had a wide moat around it. The mound contained the remains of a large Viking ship and a number of high-status objects from the end of the ninth century.

Recent investigations using modern ground-penetrating radar have confirmed extensive ship remains still buried at the site

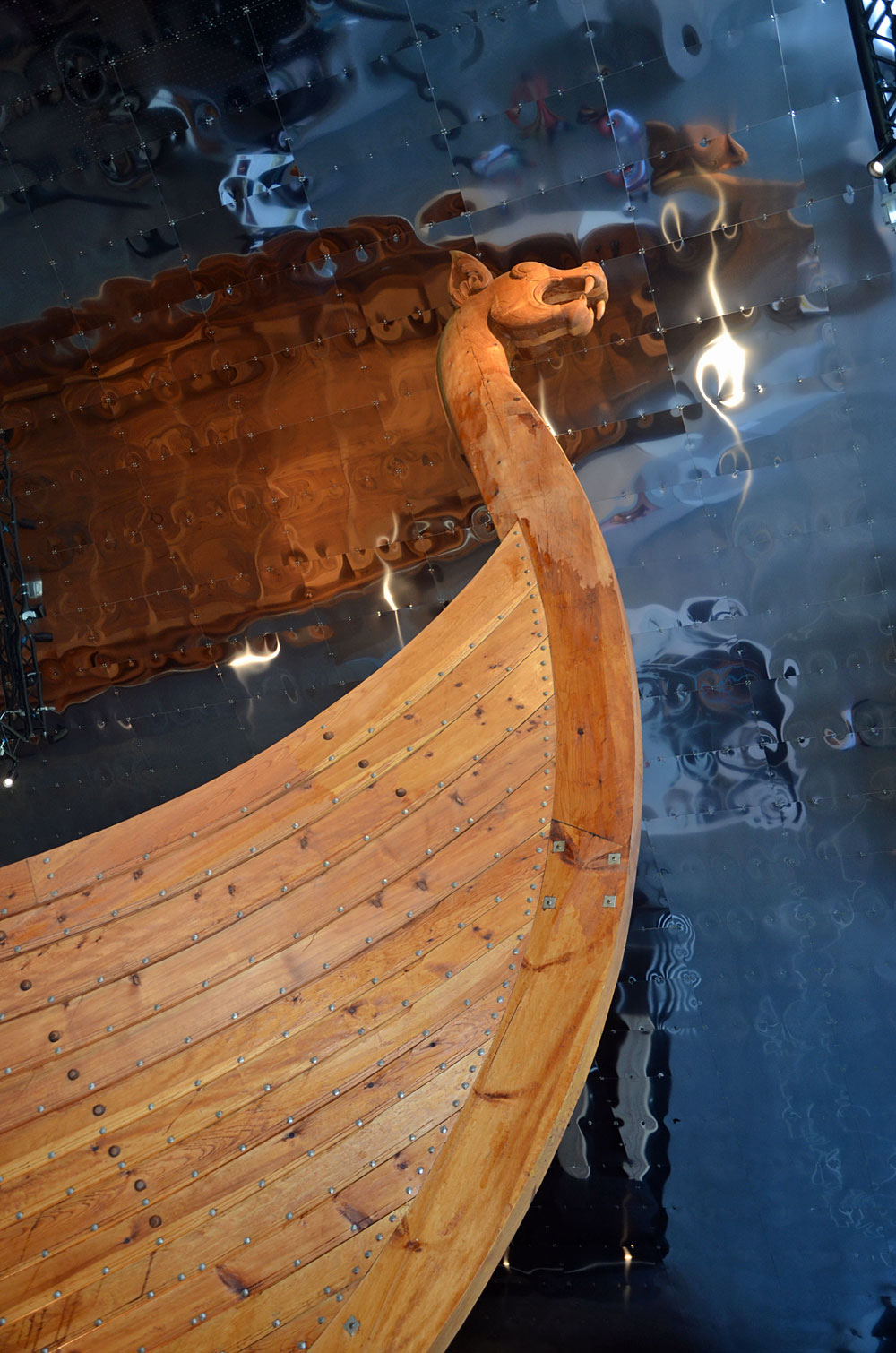
The reconstruction of the Myklebust ship in Sagastad Viking Center

== Size ==
The Myklebust ship is believed to be Norway's longest Viking ship based on the quantity and size of the ship's nails and the number of shield bulges Lorange found – a total of 42 pieces.

The size of the ship is known on the basis of several finds according to the University of Bergen:

The first is the number of rivets and nails (at least 7000), and the size of these. The size varied according to which part of the ship it had belonged to and the length told how thick the hull of the ship must have been. The second is the large amount of ash in the pile. The ash layer extended to both edges of the mound, and in the middle there were a double layer, separated by a layer of sand. The other layer may have been the burned remains of the ends of the ship, thrown into the middle before the mound was built over the grave. The third is the number of shield bosses in the grave. A total of 44 shield bosses were found, something that is believed to represent the crew of the ship. This number is counted as a minimum number as the grave was only halfway excavated. The shields would probably be placed along the rows on the ship, and therefore gives a picture of the length of the ship. Based on these points, the estimated length of the Myklebust ship is 30 meters (100 ft).

== Reconstruction ==
The Viking museum Sagastad in Nordfjordeid, houses a full-scale replica of the Myklebust ship as its main attraction. The ship's dedication ceremony was led by the Norwegian Minister of Culture Trine Skei Grande on the 10 May 2019.

The reconstruction is fully seaworthy and is launched as an annual event. The modern, purpose-built waterfront building features large rear doors and a ramp down to the fjord to facilitate launching of the vessel.

The 2024 launch was the first launch since 2019 due to the COVID-19 pandemic. The launch went viral reaching over 18 million people.
