= Alti Nordfjord =

Shopping centre in Nordfjordeid, Norway

- Location: Nordfjordeid, Vestland, Norway
- Coordinates: 61°54′31″N 5°59′09″E
- Address: Sjøgata 21, 6770 Nordfjordeid
- Opened: 2005
- Manager: Alti Forvaltning AS
- Owner: Moengården Vest AS
- Num. of stores: 25
- Floor area: 11,500 m^{2} (124,000 sq ft)
- Parking: 260 spaces
- Website: alti.no/nordfjord/

Alti Nordfjord is a shopping centre in Nordfjordeid, Stad Municipality, Vestland, Norway. It is located at Sjøgata 21 in the centre of Nordfjordeid.

The centre has over 20 shops and includes services such as a grocery store, pharmacy, bank, restaurants and a Vinmonopolet outlet. It has 25 tenants, a total area of 11,500 m^{2} (124,000 sq ft), annual turnover of NOK 552 million and 1.1 million annual visitors.

It is the largest shopping centre in Nordfjord.

== History ==
The first building stage of the shopping centre was completed in 2005.

Plans for a larger shopping centre at sjøgata were publicly discussed by 2008, with proposals for a centre of between 6,000 and 10,000 m^{2} (65,000 and 108,000 sq ft). The plans formed part of a proposed land reclamation and development area for shops, offices and housing near the waterfront. The proposal drew debate over its possible effects on the historic shopping street Eidsgata and on development along the shoreline.

Plans for a larger shopping centre at Moengården were launched in 2011. The project involved Moengården, Coop Vest and the AMFI chain, with a planned investment of NOK 100–150 million and more than 10,000 m^{2} (110,000 sq ft) of retail space.

The centre was later expanded as part of a wider development of the Nordfjordeid waterfront. In 2015, several large construction projects were underway in Eid municipality, with planned investments of around NOK 1 billion in total. Along the seafront, several hundred million kroner were planned for a shopping centre, apartments and public open space.

A major expansion opened in October 2016. The project added 6,500 m^{2} (70,000 sq ft) of new building space and brought the total building mass to 11,500 m^{2} (124,000 sq ft). The construction contract was valued at approximately NOK 100 million, while the total investment including shop fitting was estimated at around NOK 200 million.

The waterfront project involved Moengården, Coop Vest and the AMFI shopping-centre chain, and was connected to plans for around 50 apartments next to the centre. After the 2016 expansion, the centre became the largest shopping centre between Ålesund and Førde. At the time of the opening, it was also the largest shopping centre in Nordfjord.

The commercial and residential development around Sjøgata continued to be debated after the expansion. In 2017, nearby projects including retail buildings, apartment blocks and Sagastad were discussed in relation to density and the visual character of the waterfront area. The municipal position was that concentrating trade, housing and public open space in the town centre would limit urban sprawl, while critics argued that larger commercial and residential buildings could weaken the intended visual prominence of Sagastad.

In 2026 the centre purchased the eight-acre plot of land located west of Sjøgata and east of the Alti Nordfjord shopping center, and announced plans for further explains along with that the Rema store located there will become part of the center's portfolio.

== Commercial role ==
After the expansion, the centre had around 25 shops and approximately 10,000 m^{2} (110,000 sq ft) of shop area. The expansion increased sales and reduced retail leakage from Nordfjordeid to other regional shopping destinations such as Ørsta, Sogndal and Førde.

The centre is located close to Norwegian National Road 15 and the European route E39 corridor. Around 40,000 people live within 60 minutes' travel distance of the centre. The centre has 260 free parking spaces.

== Location ==
Alti Nordfjord is part of the commercial area along Sjøgata in central Nordfjordeid. The shopping centre is located near other town-centre institutions and attractions, including Sagastad and Operahuset Nordfjord.

== See also ==
- Nordfjordeid
- Sjøgata
- Eidsgata
- Sagastad
- Operahuset Nordfjord
