= Yris Hotel =

Cultural heritage site in Nordfjordeid

Yris hotell
- Handelsstaden Gjerde
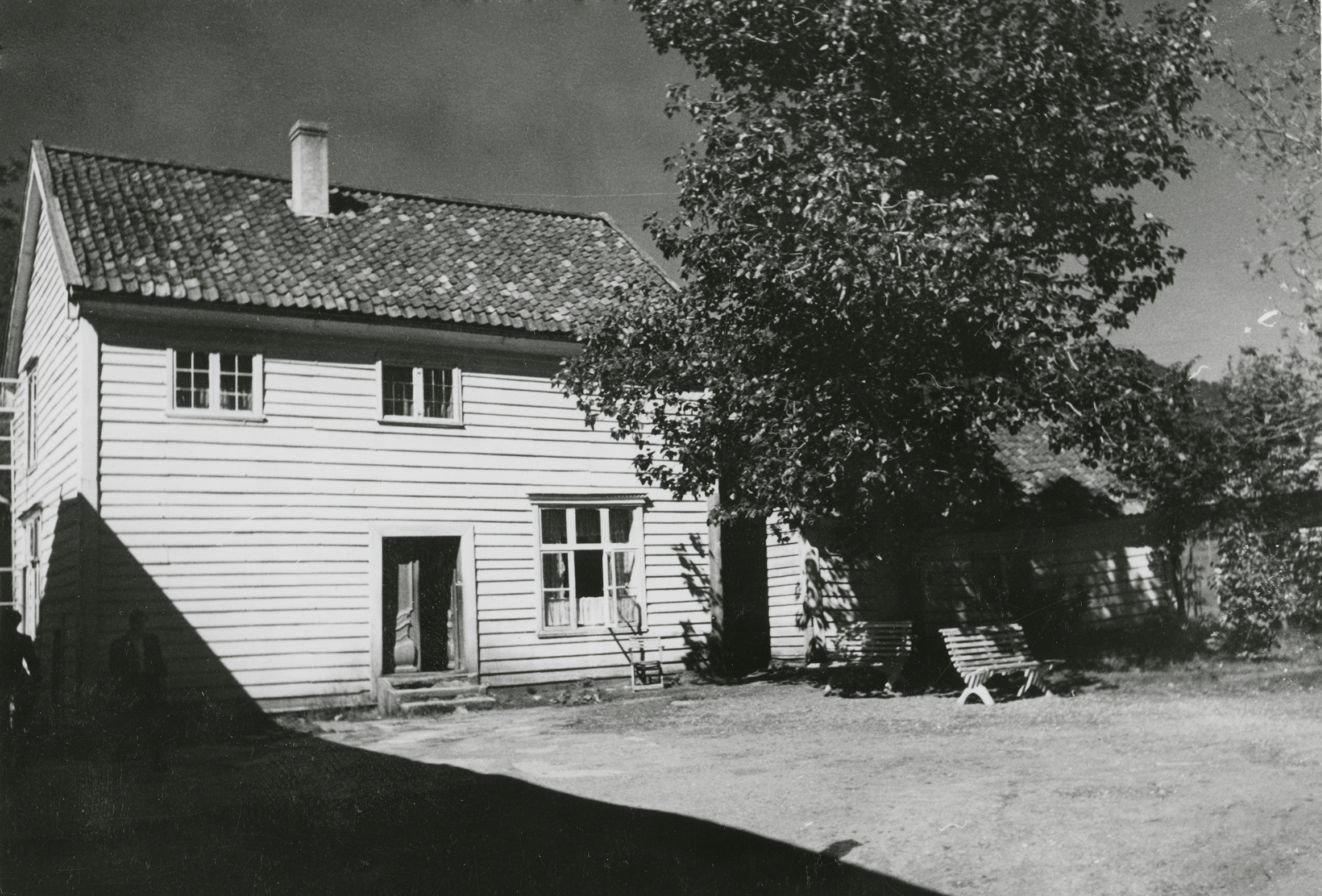
- Yris Hotel
- Interactive map of the Yris hotell area

General information
- Status: Protected heritage site (Riksantikvaren); Listed for sale (2026)
- Type: Commercial building, former hotel
- Architectural style: Norwegian timber architecture
- Location: Rådhusvegen 2, Nordfjordeid, Stad, Norway
- Coordinates: 61.905°N 5.991°E
- Year built: 1790
- Client: Tollev Lem Ravn

Yris Hotel (Norwegian: Yris Hotell) is a historical commercial building and former hotel located in Nordfjordeid, Stad Municipality, Norway.

Originally established as a trading post, the property operated as an hotel throughout the 20th century. It is a protected cultural heritage site by the Norwegian Directorate of Cultural Heritage and forms a central part of Nordfjordeid' s historic wooden townscape along with the protected area of Eidsgata.

== Location ==
The property is situated in the town centre of Nordfjordeid, at the south end of Eidsgata. Approximately 100 meters south of Kulturhuset Gamlebanken and 550 meters north of Port of Nordfjordeid.

== History ==
=== Early trading post (1634–1845) ===
The site originally served as a trading estate known as Handelsstaden Gjerde, which functioned as the central commercial hub for the mid-Nordfjord region. The earliest recorded merchant at the site was Jon Willumsen, a burgher from Bergen, who began trading there in 1634.

In 1788, the estate was purchased by Tollev Lem Ravn, who constructed the current main building in 1790. Ravn operated a guesthouse on the property until 1822. The property passed to his son, Mattis Ravn, and subsequently to Claus Krohn Wiese in 1831. Wiese expanded the estate's operations significantly by establishing a liquor distillery and a brickyard, and also landscaped the grounds with ornamental trees and statues. However, financial difficulties forced Wiese to sell the property in 1844.

The commercial success of Handelsstaden Gjerde, and its eventual transition into a major hotel, was closely tied to Nordfjordeid's military history. The nearby Ekserserplassen (the parade ground) was established in the 1620s and served as a major training center for the Norwegian infantry until 1967.

During the 18th, 19th, and early 20th centuries, annual military exercises brought a large influx of soldiers, ranking officers, and civilian spectators to the village. This recurring seasonal population boom created a substantial, reliable market for hospitality, food, and trade along Eidsgata, directly fueling the expansion of estates like Gjerdegarden to accommodate the higher-class visitors and military personnel.

=== Transition to hotel (1845–1909) ===
In 1845, Peder Schrøder Boalth purchased Gjerdegarden and acquired licenses for rural trade and hospitality. Boalth eventually converted the guesthouse into a dedicated hotel, while moving the trading operations to a different property. Under his ownership, the estate became known locally as "Boalthgarden." Following his death in 1882, his widow Anna Rosalie Karoline Brandis operated the hotel and farm until 1908.

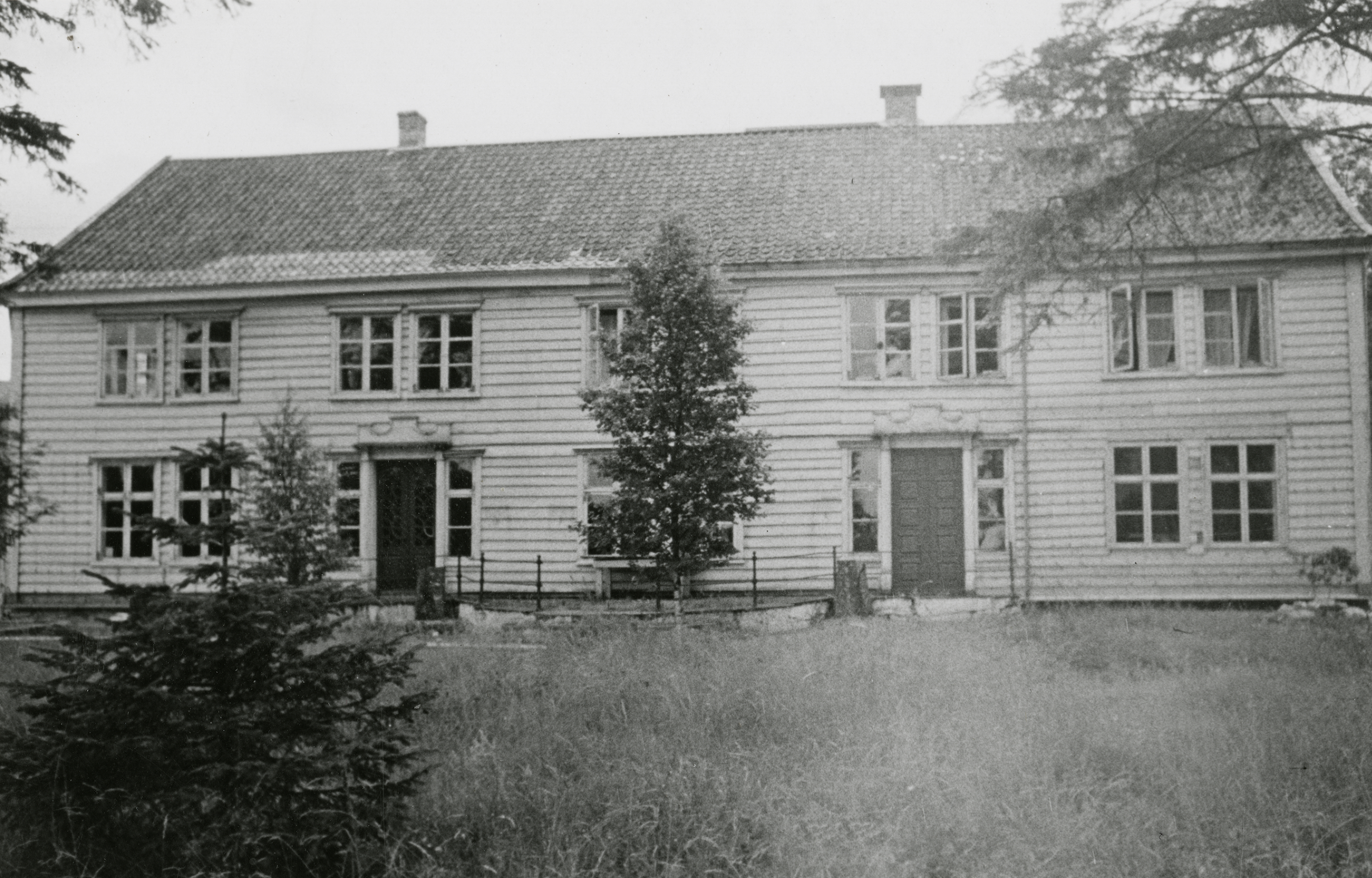
The west facing facade

==== Yris Hotell (1909–1990) ====
In 1909, hotelier Vilhelm Yri purchased the property for 34,000 NOK and renamed the establishment Yris Hotell. The hotel remained in the extended Yri family for several decades. From 1913 to 1940, it was managed by Jakob Rasmusson Sætre and his wife Anna Sofie Vilhelmsdotter Yri. In 1940, ownership transferred to Wilhelm Sivertson Yri, the grandson of the original Vilhelm Yri. During the 1940s, he began subdividing the agricultural land surrounding the hotel into separate plots.

Following Wilhelm Yri's death in 1972, the establishment was operated by Herdis Bjørlo and Winnie Yri. During this final operational period, the property transitioned from a traditional hotel into a guesthouse and boarding house, catering primarily to traveling salespeople and renting out rooms. The establishment permanently closed its doors to guests around 1990.

=== Recent history ===
In early 2026, the property at Rådhusvegen 2 was listed for sale on the open real estate market. In March 2026 the price was reduced due to lack of interest and prospective investors view that the total investment is perceived as high, especially considering the standard and need for rehabilitation.

In July 2026 the building was purchased by private individuals that intended on rehabilitating the building for new use. The new owners have chosen to use the original name of "Boalthgarden" and plan to refurbish the building for use as a hotel.

== Architecture and conservation ==
Yris Hotel is a notable example of late 18th-century Norwegian timber architecture. Because of its historical and architectural significance to the region, the 1790 main building is a protected heritage site, registered by the Norwegian Directorate for Cultural Heritage (Riksantikvaren). The property is situated within the historic district encompassing Eidsgata and the intersecting Tverrgata, an area characterized by its continuous concentration of wooden architecture.

To ensure the structural integrity of the historic building, it was previously awarded a preservation grant of 2.6 million NOK, which was allocated toward extensive restoration work, including securing the roof.
