= Kulturhuset Gamlebanken =

Cultural center in Nordfjordeid, Norway

- Kulturhuset Gamlebanken
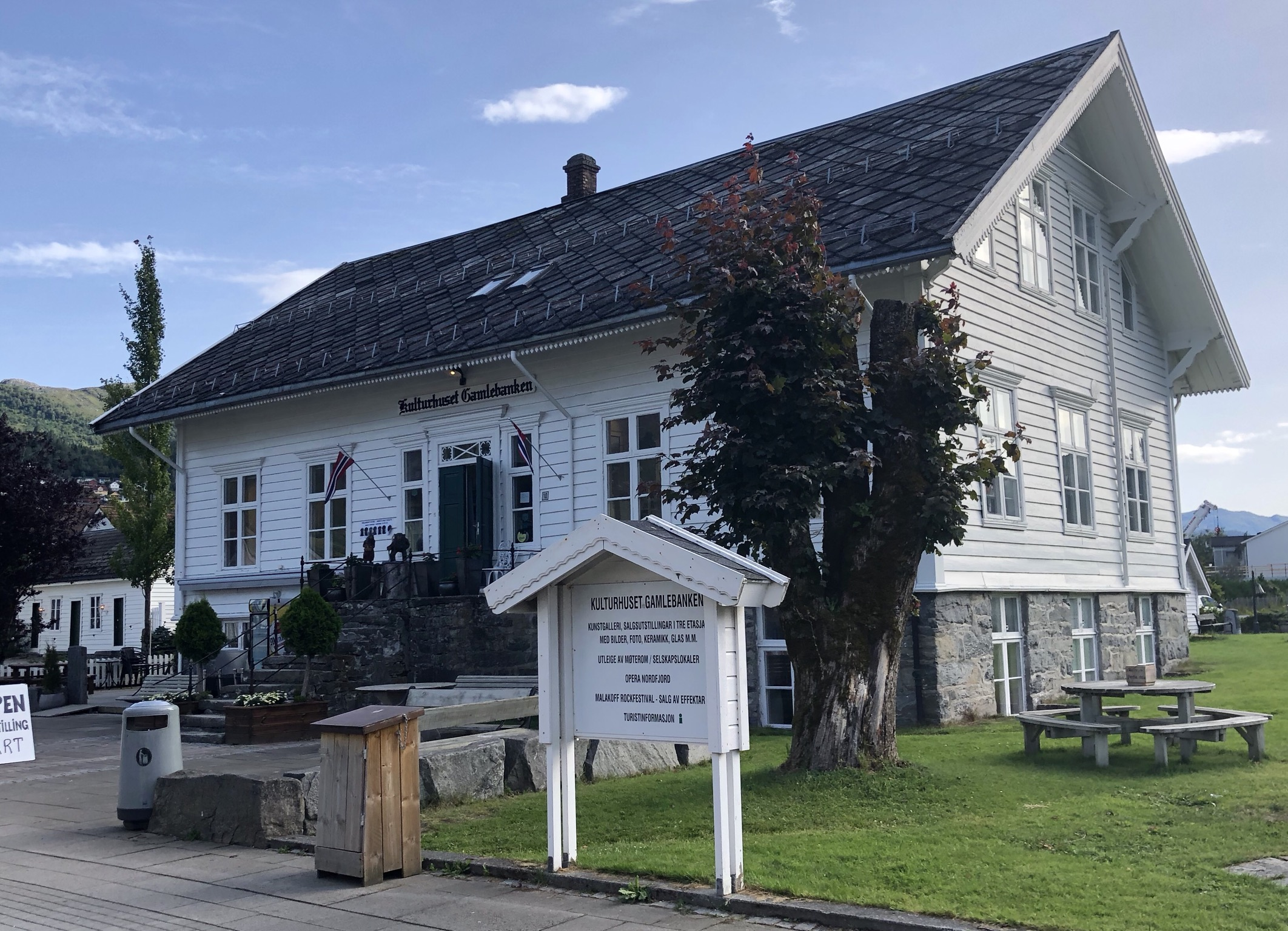
- Kulturhuset Gamlebanken in Nordfjordeid
- Former names: Nordfjord Sparebank (1881–c. 1961); Eid folkebibliotek (1960s–1980s)

General information
- Type: Cultural center (formerly bank and library)
- Location: Eidsgata 10, Nordfjordeid, Stad, Norway
- Coordinates: 61°54′25″N 5°59′24″E
- Current tenants: Opera Nordfjord, Stad Tourist Information, Malakoff Rock Festival
- Construction started: 1879
- Completed: 1881
- Opened: 1881
- Renovated: c. 1990
- Client: Nordfjord Sparebank
- Owner: Stiftinga Kulturhuset Gamlebanken

Design and construction
- Main contractor: Rasmus D. Nøstdal, Anders K. Skibenes, Didrik Guttormsen Roti

The Old Bank Cultural Center (Norwegian: Kulturhuset Gamlebanken) is a cultural center and landmark located on Eidsgata in Nordfjordeid, Stad Municipality.

Originally constructed in 1881 to house the Nordfjord region's first savings bank, the building operated as a financial institution for over 80 years. After being saved from demolition and extensively restored in the 1990s, the wooden structure now serves as a community hub for arts and culture.

== Location ==
The building is located at the south end of Eidsgata, at its intersection with Bankgata, approximately 100 meters north of Yris Hotel and 650 meters north of the Port of Nordfjordeid. The intersecting street (Bank Street) derives its name directly from the building's historical function.

As a historic wooden structure, the building is an integral component of the surrounding district. Both the individual property and the wider continuous environment of wooden architecture are recognized by the Norwegian Directorate for Cultural Heritage as the 'Eidsgata and Tverrgata' Cultural Environment and Landscape of National Interest

== Current use and facilities ==
Today, Kulturhuset Gamlebanken operates as a multi-purpose community and cultural venue. The main floor features rotating and permanent exhibitions of visual arts, photography, ceramics, and glass art. The historic wooden structure is recognized for its internal acoustics and frequently serves as a venue for pop-up concerts, hosting performances that range from rock to classical music and opera.

In 2009 during the premiere of Carmen in Nordfjordeid, HM Queen Sonja of Norway attended an opera conference at the center.

On 4 October 2023, HM Queen Sonja of Norway visited the center as the designated "Opera Artist of the Year" for Opera Nordfjord, exhibiting her own artwork in the main floor gallery.

The building also accommodates several local organizations and services. It houses the administrative offices for Opera Nordfjord, a physical shop for the Malakoff Rock Festival, and the seasonal tourist information center for Stad Municipality. Additionally, the basement level has been repurposed into a local bar and tavern.

== History ==
Origins and construction

The origins of the building are tied to the first savings bank in the region, Nordfjord Sparebank. The bank's founding capital was derived from the liquidation of the local Nordfjord grain magazine (kornmagasin), which had been established in 1818 through a financial gift from King Carl Johan.

In 1877, Nordfjord Sparebank purchased a plot of land known as Bankplassen (The Bank Square) to construct a dedicated headquarters. Following a bidding process, the construction contract was awarded in 1879 to builders Rasmus D. Nøstdal and Anders K. Skibenes, alongside blacksmith and stonemason Didrik Guttormsen Roti. The bank officially moved into the structure in the autumn of 1881, though the interior was completed in stages, with the loft finalized between 1886 and 1891.

Alterations and municipal use

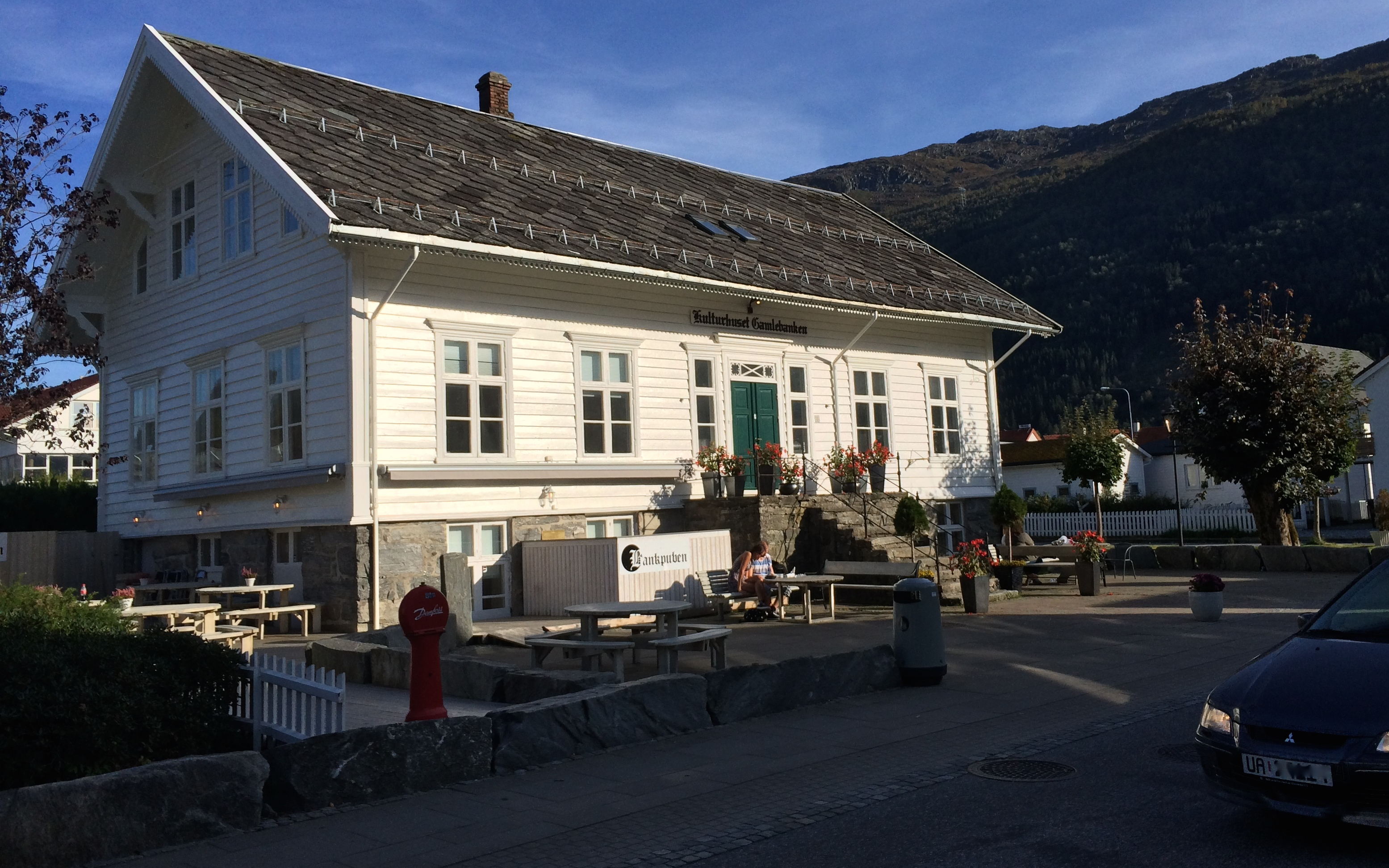
Kulturhuset Gamlebanken as seen from the North.

The building operated continuously as a bank for approximately 80 years. Following World War II, the bank required more space, leading to the construction of a two-story eastern extension in 1949. Due to post-war material shortages, this practical addition significantly altered and compromised the building's original 19th-century architectural style. The bank eventually relocated in the early 1960s. Following their departure, the building was repurposed to house the Eid Public Library (Eid folkebibliotek), which operated there until the 1980s.

Threat of demolition and restoration

During the 1980s, the property's new owner, the merged banking entity Sparebanken Vest, considered selling or demolishing the structure to make way for a modern commercial building. However, the local Eid Municipality advocated for its preservation due to its distinctive character and historic value to the Eidsgata streetscape.

Consequently, the demolition plans were abandoned, and Sparebanken Vest undertook an extensive restoration around 1990. The mid-century alterations were addressed, and the building was carefully restored to its original 1880s architectural style. Following the renovation, it was briefly utilized again as an administrative building for the bank until structural changes in the banking sector led them to vacate the property entirely in 1997.

Establishment of Kulturhuset Gamlebanken

After the bank moved out, the building was reimagined as a community hub for arts and culture. At the end of 1998, it officially opened as Kulturhuset Gamlebanken (The Old Bank Cultural Center). Initially, Sparebanken Vest made the building available to a newly formed foundation to manage the cultural activities. In 2006, the foundation (Stiftinga Kulturhuset Gamlebanken) formally assumed full ownership of the property. Today, the historic building operates as a central cultural institution in Nordfjordeid, hosting art exhibitions, local organizations, and the regional tourist information center.
