= Eid Upper Secondary School =

Upper secondary school in Nordfjordeid, Norway

Eid vidaregåande skule
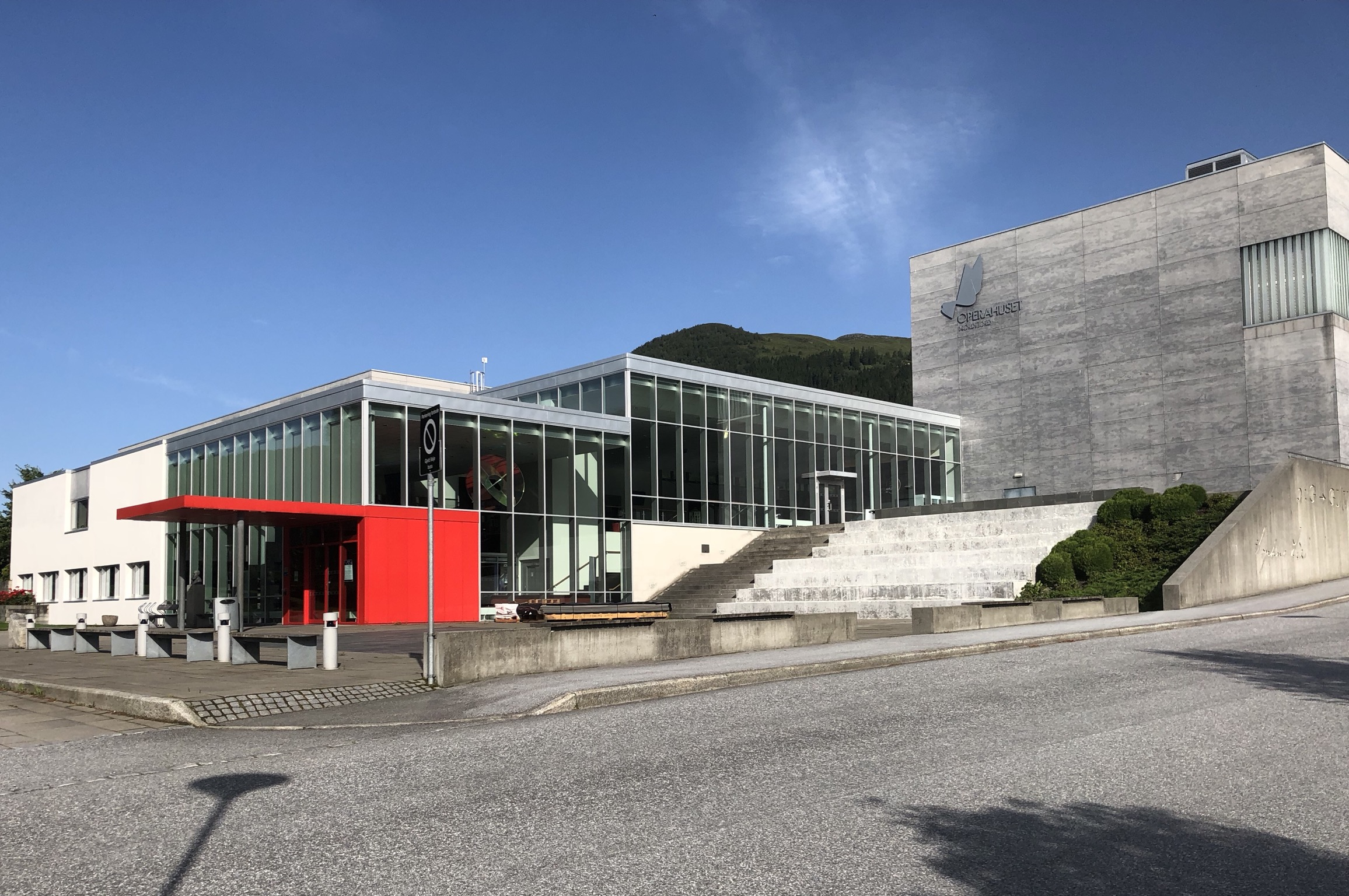
- The school with its shared complex collocated with Operahuset Nordfjord

Location
- Sophus Lie-vegen 3, Nordfjordeid, Vestland; Norway
- 61°54′49″N 5°59′00″E

Information
- Type: Public upper secondary school
- Established: 1922
- Authority: Vestland County Municipality
- Staff: c. 70
- Grades: Vg1–Vg3
- Enrollment: c. 330
- Language: Nynorsk
- Website: www.eid.vgs.no

Eid vidaregåande skule (English: Eid Upper Secondary School) is a public upper secondary school in Nordfjordeid, Stad Municipality, Vestland, Norway. The school was established in 1922 as Eids toårige gymnas and is operated by Vestland County Municipality.

The school is located at Sophus Lie-vegen 3 and shares facilities with Operahuset Nordfjord, a combined cultural and educational complex containing a library, cinema, foyer and opera hall.

== History ==
Eid vidaregåande skule began in 1922 as Eids toårige gymnas, a two-year gymnasium in Nordfjordeid. The school marked its first 70 years in 1992 with the publication of Har du òg gått på Eid?, a school history covering the period from 1922 to 1992.

The institution developed within the broader upper secondary school system in Nordfjord, combining study-preparatory and vocational education. In the public register, the school is listed as a subunit of Vestland County Municipality with activity codes for both vocational and study-preparatory upper secondary education.

In the 1980s, there were two high schools in Nordfjordeid.

Eid vocational school, which continued the traditions of Holmøy work school, with cabinetmaking and blacksmithing and mechanics, and expanded to include training in electrical engineering and electronics. Eid upper secondary school continued the high school and Georg Kragseth's business school.

In the 1990s, the county council took over ownership and the schools were merged from August 1, 1992 under the name Eid secondary school. Today, everything is under the same roof.

Eid vidaregåande skule is one of the central educational institutions in Nordfjordeid, alongside Fjordane Folkehøgskule and the town's primary and lower secondary schools.

In recent years the school has had the highest occupancy rates in the Nordfjord region.

== Campus ==
The current school complex is integrated with Operahuset Nordfjord, which opened in 2009. The building combines school facilities with cultural functions used outside school hours.

Several rooms have shared educational and cultural use. The cinema is used as a school auditorium, the library also functions as the school library, the foyer is used as the school canteen, and the opera hall can be used for larger school gatherings. The school also cooperates with Opera Nordfjord on stage productions, including work with sets and props.

The complex includes an opera hall, orchestra pit, cinema, library, canteen and backstage facilities integrated with the school building.

== Education ==
Eid vidaregåande skule has approximately 330 pupils and 20 groups/classes. The language variant used at the school is Nynorsk. The school has around 70 employees.

The school offers both general studies and vocational education. Programmes include specialization in general studies, electrical engineering and computer technology, hairdressing, floral, interior and retail design, technological and industrial production, and supplementary studies for general university admissions certification.

It is the only upper secondary school in Norway that educates students in industrial furniture production.

== NASA HUNCH participation ==
In 2024–2025, pupils at Eid vidaregåande skule participated in activities connected to NASA HUNCH, a school-based programme in which students fabricate real-world products for NASA and astronauts aboard the International Space Station.

Pupils from the school have worked on parts intended for space-related use, and Eid vidaregåande skule was represented digitally at the Norwegian NASA HUNCH kick-off at Læringsfabrikken on Raufoss in November 2024.

== See also ==
- Nordfjordeid
- Operahuset Nordfjord
- Vestland County Municipality
