= Alfred Bjørlo =

Norwegian politician

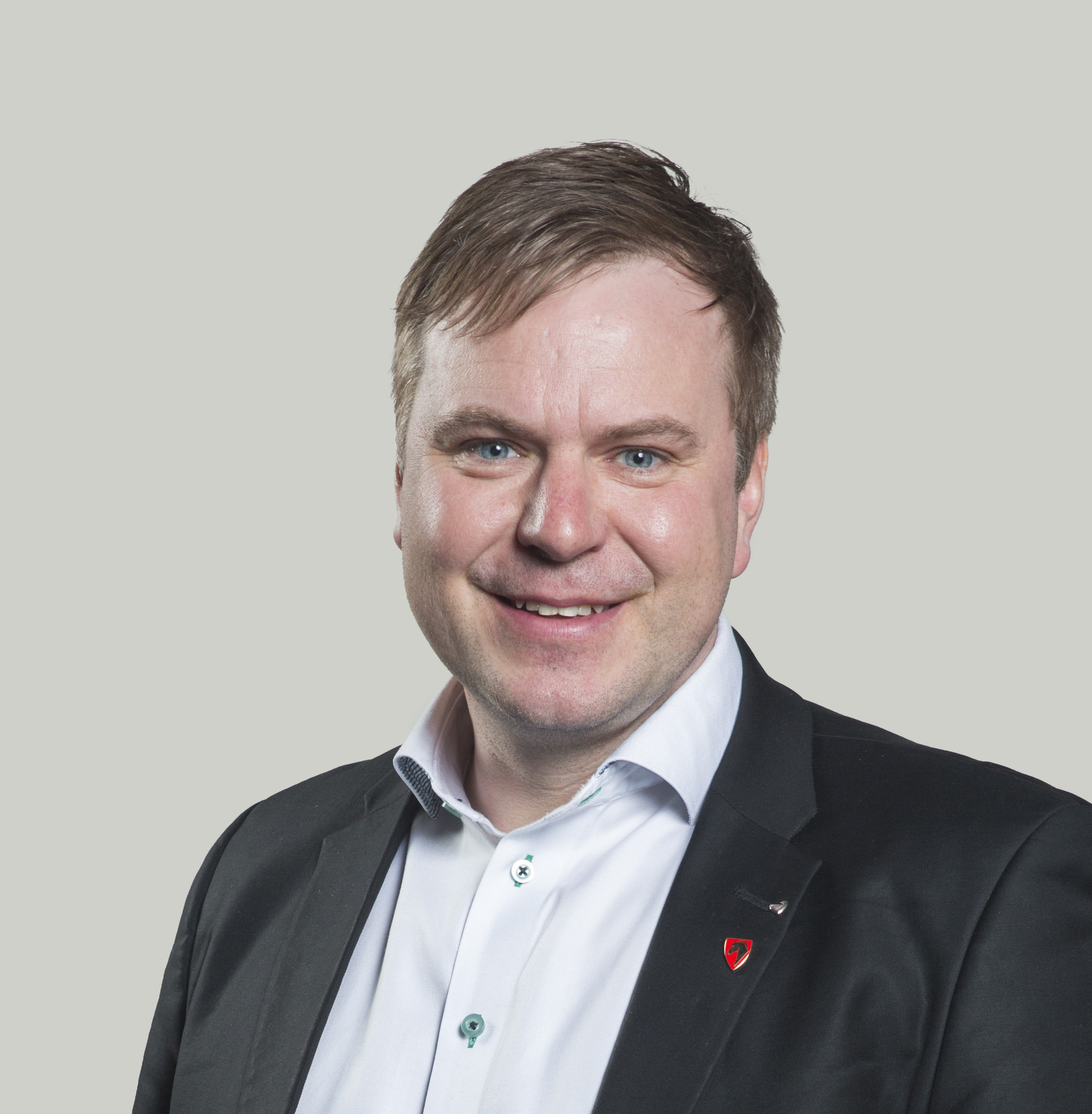
- Born: 17 December 1972 (age 53); Bjørlo, Eid, Sogn og Fjordane, Norway
- Education: University of Bergen
- Occupation: Politician
- Political party: Liberal Party

Alfred Jens Bjørlo (born 17 December 1972) is a Norwegian politician for the Liberal Party (Venstre).He served as a member of the Storting for the constituency of Sogn og Fjordane during the 2021–2025 parliamentary term. He currently serves as the first CEO of the Drivkraft business foundation.

== Early life and education ==
Bjørlo was born on 17 December 1972 and is the son of Daniel Ivar Bjørlo and Ragnhild Lovise Alsaker. He grew up in Eid in what is now Stad Municipality, and later settled at Bjørlo, around 3 km from Nordfjordeid.

He completed his upper secondary education at Eid vidaregåande skule from 1988 to 1991, before studying at the University of Bergen, where he earned a cand.mag. degree in science and social studies (1991–1995) and later a cand.scient. degree in biology, specializing in invertebrate systematics (1996–1997).

== Early career ==
In 1998, Bjørlo served as an instructor at the Norwegian Navy’s Havarivernskolen at Haakonsvern, completing his first‑service duty. He later worked as:

- Political adviser for Venstre’s parliamentary group (2000–2001)
- Senior adviser at Burson‑Marsteller (2004–2007)
- Managing director of Måløy Vekst AS (2007–2011)

== Political career ==
=== Government roles ===
Bjørlo was a political adviser in:

- The Ministry of Trade and Industry (1999–2000)
- The Ministry of Transport and Communications (2001–2004)

=== Local and county politics ===
Bjørlo served as mayor of Eid Municipality from 2011 to 2019, and after the municipal merger he became the first mayor of the new Stad Municipality from 2019 to 2021.

He has held a wide range of municipal and county‑level political roles, including:

- Member of Eid Municipal Council (1991–1995)
- Mayor of Eid (2011–2015, 2015–2019)
- Mayor of Stad Municipality (2019–2021)
- Member of the Sogn og Fjordane County Council (1991–1995, 2011–2015, 2015–2019, 2019–2023)

=== Stortinget ===
In the 2021–2025 term, Bjørlo served as:

- Member of the Standing Committee on Business and Industry (19 October 2021 – 30 September 2025)
- Substitute member of the Delegation for Arctic Parliamentary Cooperation (28 October 2021 – 30 September 2025)

=== Party roles ===
Within Venstre, he has served as:

- Member of the Central Board (2010–2014)
- Directly elected member of the National Board (2014–2022)

== Personal life ==
Bjørlo is married and has two children. He lives at Bjørlo in Stad Municipality.

He enjoys outdoor activities, physical training, reading, and rock music, and has played the cornet in the Eid Musikklag since moving back in 2007.

== Political views ==
Bjørlo has been described as a strong district advocate, emphasizing decentralization of state jobs and education, support for small businesses, and development of green industries in Western Norway

He was called a "district psychopath" by then Venstre leader Trine Skei Grande. He was in 2019 named municipal profile of the year in Norway.
