= Sjøgata =

Street in Nordfjordeid

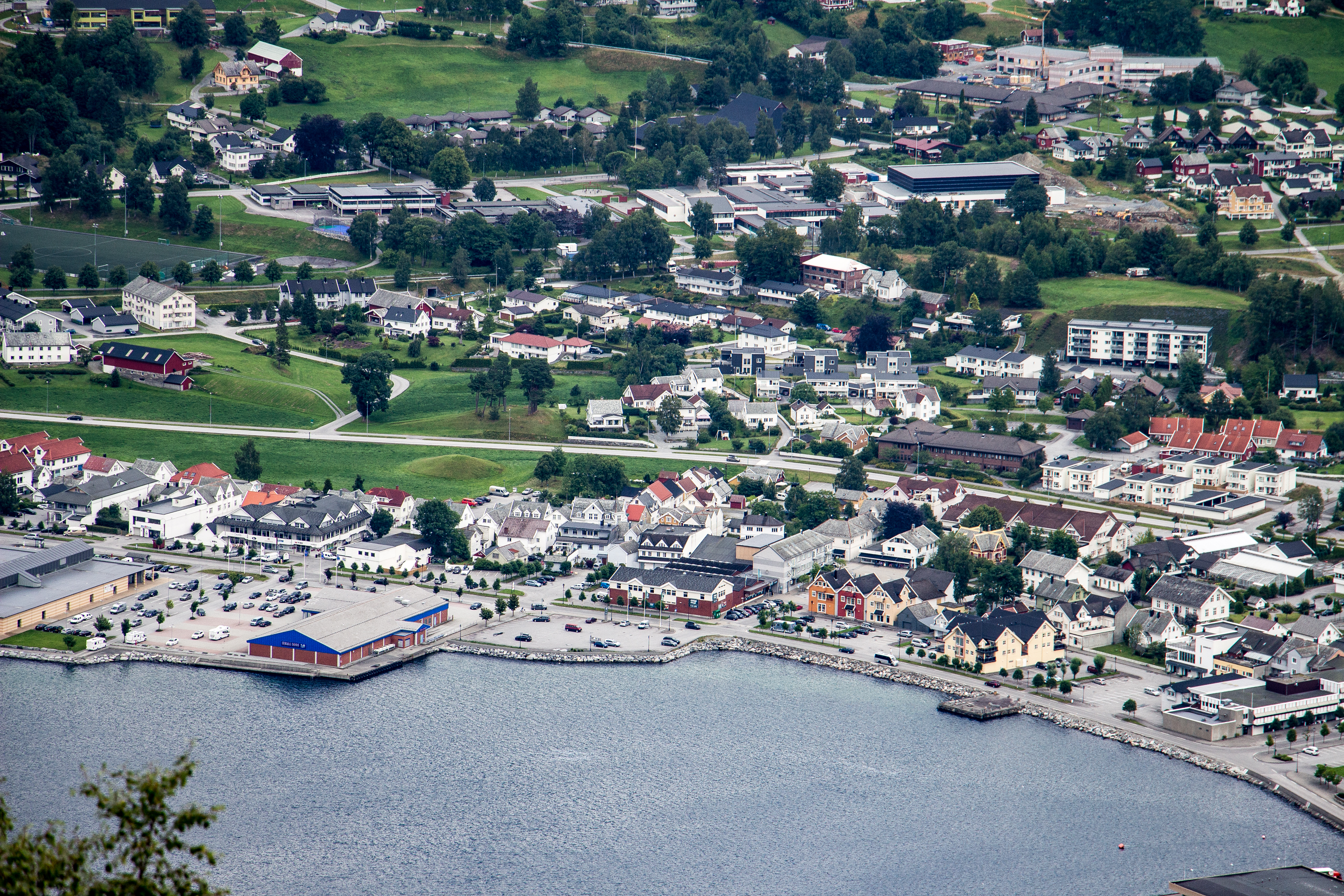
- Parts of Sjøgata
- Type: Municipal
- Location: Nordfjordeid, Stad Municipality, Vestland, Norway
- Postal code: 6770
- West end: Norwegian National Road 15
- East end: Kaivegen and Port of Nordfjordeid

Other
- Known for: Sagastad, Alti Nordfjord, Sagaparken

Sjøgata (English: The Sea Street) is a primary commercial and transport thoroughfare in the village of Nordfjordeid, the administrative center of Stad Municipality in Vestland county, Norway.

Established through extensive land reclamation in the Eidsfjorden beginning in the mid-1960s, the street serves as the main link between the Riksvei 15 highway, the historic center of Eidsgata, and the waterfront. It is home to commercial developments such as the Alti Nordfjord shopping center and cultural landmarks including the Sagastad Viking Center.

== History ==
=== From shoreline to land reclamation ===
Prior to the construction of Sjøgata, the area was the natural shoreline of the Eidsfjorden, and Nordfjordeid was historically known locally as Strandstaden (The Beach Town). However, in the post-World War II era, the original beach was heavily polluted. It suffered from direct sewage outfalls, runoff from two local slaughterhouses, and served as an unofficial dumping ground for household waste, making the shoreline largely inaccessible and hazardous.

To accommodate the growing traffic and route the new highway toward the Lote ferry, land reclamation operations began in the mid-1960s. The initial foundation for Sjøgata was constructed using excavated rock generated by the blasting of the nearby Lotetunnelen, which had its breakthrough in November 1965. By 1966, the street's initial landfill was completed, paving the way for the new Riksvei to run straight through the center of the village.

The filling process along the shoreline was gradual. As late as 1982, parts of the northern fill area along Sjøgata remained an open, hazardous pond contaminated with sewage sludge. The area was frequently used as an illegal dumping ground where locals discarded everything from agricultural waste to abandoned cars and demolished houses, forcing local neighbors to organize cleanups.

Further filling continued into the 1980s, when dredged materials from the local marina were used to create the foundation for what is now the Church Park (Kyrkjeparken) next to Eid Church.

=== Commercial development ===
Before 1966, it was easy to orient oneself in the center of Nordfjordeid, as trade and civic life were centered entirely around the older wooden buildings of Eidsgata and Tverrgata. The commercial shift toward the waterfront began when Eids Handelslag (later part of the Coop cooperative) began expanding its facilities from Eidsgata outward onto the new landfill in stages during the 1960s and 1970s.

The commercial utilization of the former seabed expanded significantly in 1982 when Esso proposed building a gas station on a rock fill at the intersection of Riksvei 15 and Sjøgata in an area known as Leirongane. Today, this industrial and commercial sector houses multiple businesses.

In 2005, the Amfi Nordfjord shopping center was established in the Moengården complex along the western stretch of Sjøgata. Following a major 11,500-square-meter expansion in 2016, the center (now rebranded as Alti Nordfjord) cemented Sjøgata's position as the primary modern retail hub for the region.

=== Architectural reception and urban planning ===
The aesthetic and urban impact of Sjøgata's development was heavily criticized in its early decades. In a 1988 report for Bergens Tidende, journalist Jan Nyberg dismissed the street as a "garbage dump and an architectural magpie's nest" constructed from rock and scrap. While local politicians defended the area as a necessary "modern business district", critics continued to warn that the strictly commercial zoning of Sjøgata risked turning the street into a "dead zone" after business hours.

The loss of direct sea contact also sparked decades of local debate. By the 1990s, local chapters of the Norwegian Society for the Conservation of Nature argued that the commercial zoning and parking lots south of Sjøgata should be removed to restore the town's status as a coastal environment.

This environmental movement eventually influenced modern municipal planning. Recognizing the 1960s landfilling as a barrier that severed the "beach town" from its fjord, the municipality spent over a decade planning a reversal of this separation. This culminated in September 2016 with the opening of Sagaparken, a 17.5 million NOK urban park and artificial beach constructed along the southern edge of Sjøgata.

The project successfully restored public recreational access to the fjord. During its inauguration, Deputy Mayor Eli Førde Aarskog highlighted the new urban dynamic, comparing Nordfjordeid to Barcelona by noting that the village now possessed a beach leading right into the modern center (Sjøgata), while the historic wooden streets of Eidsgata and Tverrgata functioned as the "old town".

Sjøgata also serves as the primary pedestrian and transit artery for the Port of Nordfjordeid.

== Landmarks ==
- Alti Nordfjord: The largest shopping center in the municipality, significantly expanded in 2016.
- Sagastad: A knowledge center housing the reconstructed Myklebust ship.
- Sagaparken: An urban park and beach area situated between Sjøgata and the fjord.
- Port of Nordfjordeid: A cruise pier accessible via Sjøgata.
