= Operahuset Nordfjord =

Opera house in Nordfjordeid, Norway

Coordinates: 61.9136°N 5.9833°E

Nordfjord Opera House
- Operahuset Nordfjord
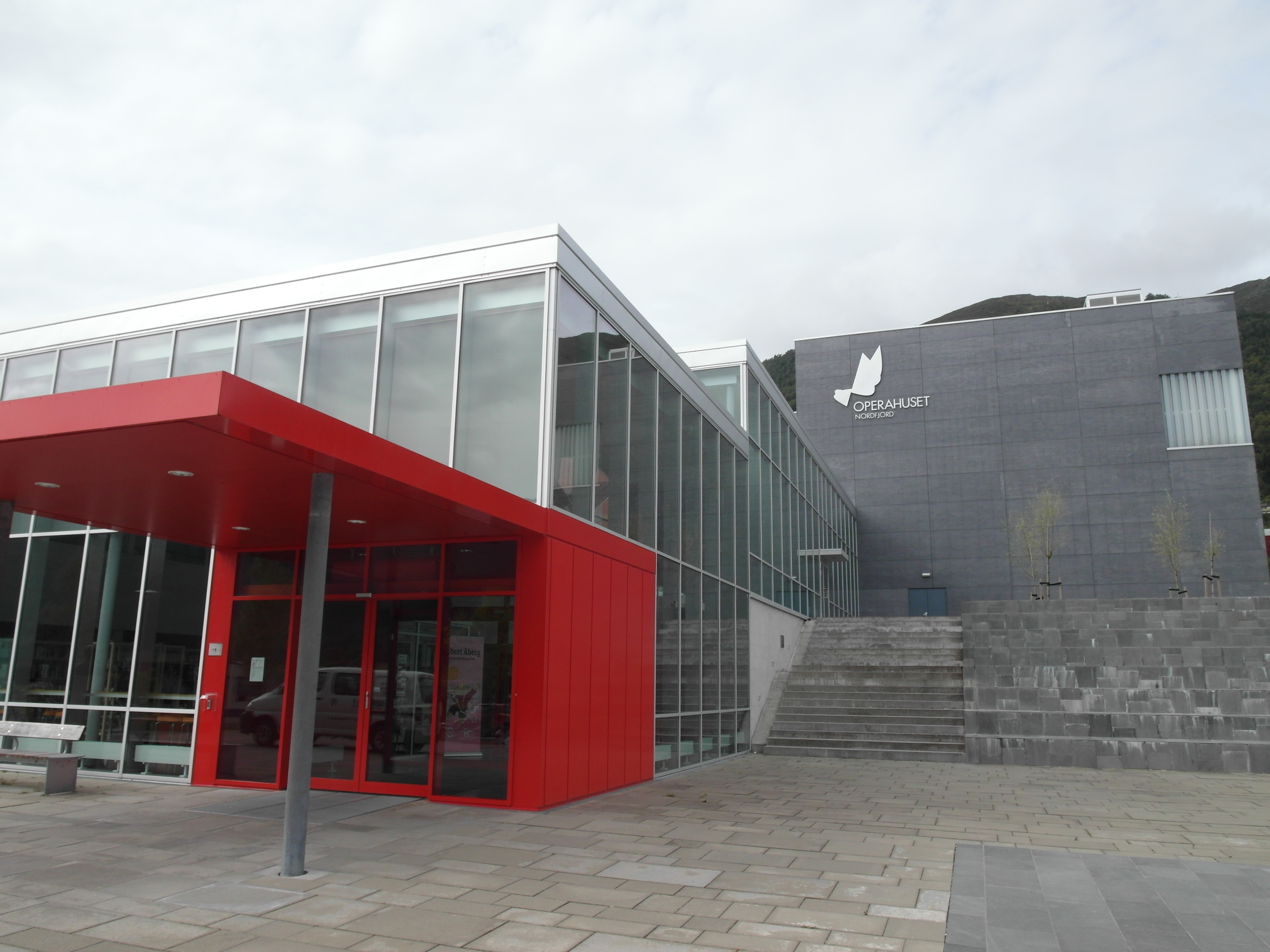
- Interactive map of the Nordfjord Opera House area

General information
- Type: Opera House
- Location: Sophus Lie-vegen 3, Nordfjordeid, Norway
- Completed: March 1, 2009
- Opened: August 25, 2009
- Inaugurated: October 7, 2009
- Cost: 183,000,000 NOK
- Client: Sogn of Fjordane County Municipality

Technical details
- Size: 9,132 m2
- Floor count: 5

Design and construction
- Architect: Nordplan AS
- Main contractor: Åsen & Øverlid AS

Other information
- Seating capacity: 550 (Main theatre) | 110 (Cinema)
- Parking: Yes

Website
- www.operahuset.no

The Nordfjord Opera house (Norwegian: Operahuset Nordfjord) is the home of Opera Nordfjord and is the second opera house in Norway. The building is situated in the town center of Nordfjordeid in Western Norway, north of the Sagastad Viking Center. It is operated by Vestland County Municipality and Stad Municipality. The building also houses Eid Upper Secondary School. The structure is 9,132 square metres (98,300 sq ft). The main auditorium seats 530 while the cinema seats 105. The main stage is 14 metres (46 ft) wide and 10 metres (33 ft) deep.

== History ==
In 1997, the idea of a regional opera arose for the first time in Nordfjordeid. In 1998 the local Opera company known as Opera Nordfjord was formed as an initiative by the married couple Kari Standal Pavelich (Director) and Michael Pavelich (Conductor). The first production was Die Fledermaus in 1998. As a result of the regional opera successes there was a need for an Opera house in the town, and a collaboration project with Eid Upper Secondary School was established. The school wanted to co-locate the vocational department with its general studies department, and the Opera required a building for its productions.

The Opera house project went through several iterations over many years, and ended up being funded by:

- private investors (2.5 million kr)
- Eid Municipality (45.5 million kr)
- Sogn og Fjordane County Municipality (118 million kr)
- the Norwegian Government (17 million kr)

Construction started in April 2007 with a budget of 135 million kr. The total costs ended up being 183 million NOK.

The construction of the building was finished on 1 March 2009. The building was officially opened by the Minister of Culture Trond Giske on the 25 April 2009. In October 2009 HM Queen Sonja attended the premiere of the first Opera Carmen to be held in the new building. The Queen also opened the "Opera-week" in Nordfjordeid. In 2018 Kari and Michael Pavelich were awarded a royal distinction, the King's Medal of Merit for their 20 years of work and commitment connected to Opera and culture in Nordfjordeid.

During the 10 year anniversary of the building in 2019 it was visited by Prime Minister Erna Solberg.

During October 2023 HM Queen Sonja attended the 25 anniversary of Opera Nordfjord, during the premiere of the locally produced and written musical "Soga om Sol". Prior to the premiere the Queen opened her own gallery exhibition at Gamlebanken in Eidsgata.

== Building ==
The building is a combination of an Opera house and school. The western part of the building is exclusively for educational purposes, with almost 400 students and 90 educational staff during the day. The eastern part of the building houses the main theatre, library, cinema and several conference rooms, offices and the foyer lobby.

=== Main theater ===
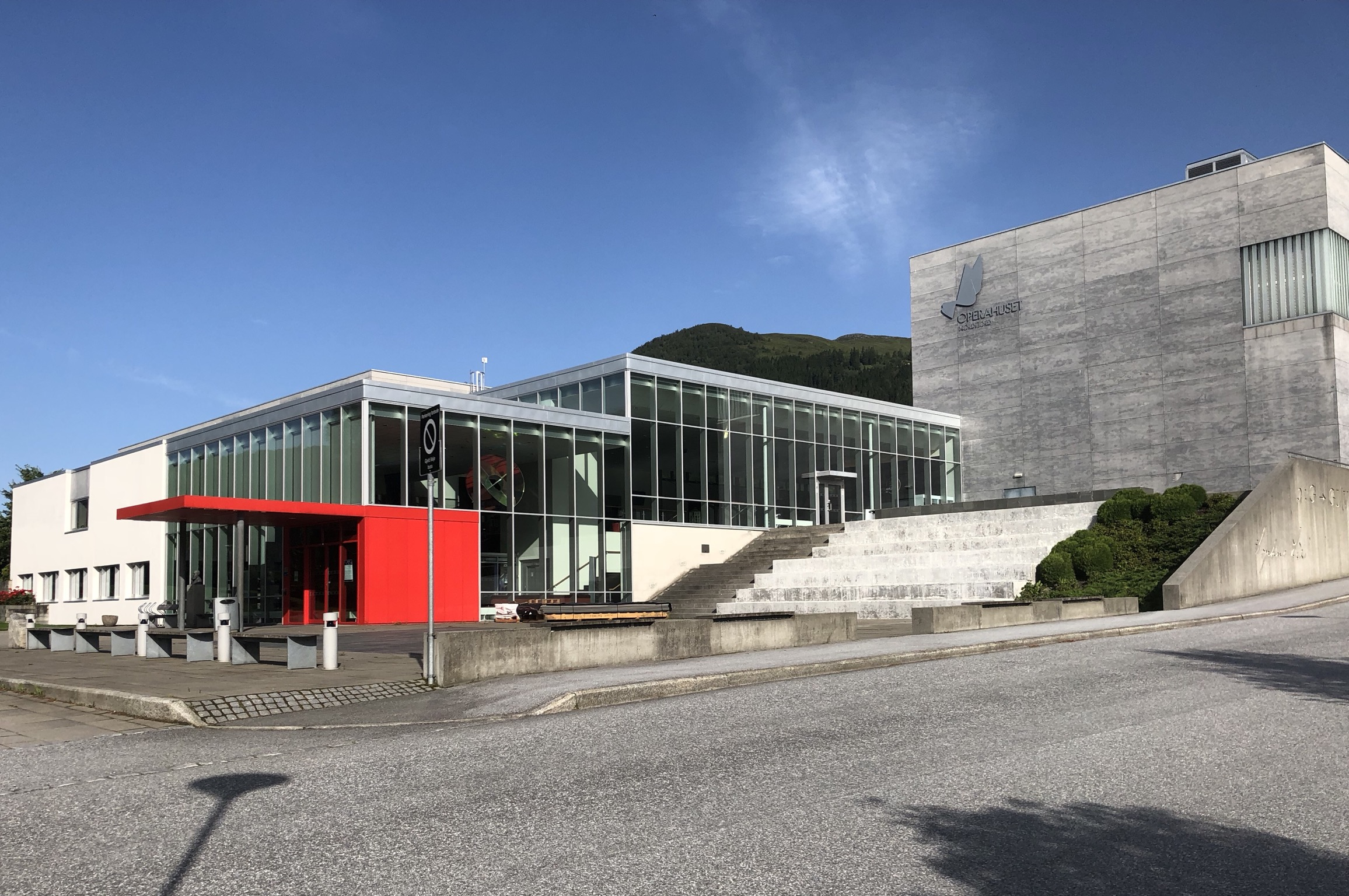
The Nordfjord Opera house

The main theatre includes a gallery, stage, orchestra pit, 5 dressing rooms, toilets and showers. The maximum occupancy is 550, including 6 handicap spots. 218 of the seats are located in the gallery. When the orchestra pit is in use the total occupancy is reduced to 484 seats. The main stage is 14 metres (46 ft) wide, 10 metres (33 ft) deep, and the height is 12 metres (39 ft). The theatre features advanced acoustics that can be adjusted dependent on production requirements. The chamber is specially constructed and adapted for acoustic music, using the same techniques as found in the Operahouse in Oslo.

There are reflective surfaces in the ceiling and walls of hard boards as well as the possibility of dampening reverberation with carpets in the ceiling and on the back wall, which are curved and broken up. Some sound absorption has been added to capture the bass in low-frequency pop and rock. Many of the stage textiles are in sound-reflecting material. It is also possible to lower sound reflectors that form a kind of stage house above the orchestra. This improves the possibility of interaction on stage and provides more sound in the chamber.

=== Cinema ===
The cinema has an occupancy capacity of 105 seats, including 6 handicap spaces. It is used as the main cinema in Nordfjordeid, with several movie viewings offered per week.

=== Foyer ===
The foyer is used as the main lobby during productions. It has a seating capacity of approximately 300 people for gala events and dinners. During the day time it acts as a cantina for the students at the upper secondary school. The foyer also hosts art exhibitions and conferences.

=== Library ===
The library is located next to the southern entrance of the building on the ground floor. It is operated by Stad Municipality, and is open all year. The library offers books, audio books, newspapers, DVDs and video games. The library also hosts cultural events, visits from authors and smaller concerts.

== Productions and performances ==
Throughout each year since the opening of the opera house there has been a varied lineup of performances in the building. Including musicals, operas, operettas, rock concerts, stand-up comedy, jazz, ballet, and dance shows.

=== Opera productions ===
Opera Nordfjord has held 14 unique productions in the Opera House since 2009. Prior performances where held in the Nordfjord Folk-High School.

Opera productions
Year	Production name	Notes
2009	Carmen	Attended by HM Queen Sonja.
2010	Norway-Brazil – An Opera	Original operetta production by Opera Nordfjord. Written by Are Kalvø
2011	The Magic Flute	
2012	Madama Butterfly	
2013	Die Fledermaus	
2014	Turandot	
2015	Un ballo in maschera	
2016	i puritani	
2017	Sildagapet	Original operetta production by Opera Nordfjord. Written by Jostein Avdem Fretland and Helge Sunde.
2018	La bohème	
2019	Hansel and Gretel	
2020	Man of La Mancha	
2021	No production due to the COVID-19 pandemic	
2022	Man of La Mancha	Rerun after COVID-19. Also performed in the Oslo Opera house.
2022	La traviata	
2023	Soga om Sol	Original production written by Øystein Wiik and Gisle Kverndokk. HM Queen Sonja attended the premiere to celebrate the 25 year anniversary of Opera Nordfjord. The Queen also visited Sagastad Viking Center.
2024	TBA	

=== School musicals ===
The Eid Upper secondary school sets up a musical performance annually in cooperation with Opera Nordfjord.

School musicals
Year	Production name
2009	Grease
2010	Rent
2011	West Side Story
2012	Les Misérables
2013	Hairspray
2014	Legally Blonde
2015	Fiddler on the Roof
2016	Sweeney Todd
2017	Back to the 80s
2018	Beauty and the Beast
2019	Oklahoma!
