= Eidsgata =

Street in Nordfjordeid, Norway

Coordinates: 61°54′24″N 5°59′21″E

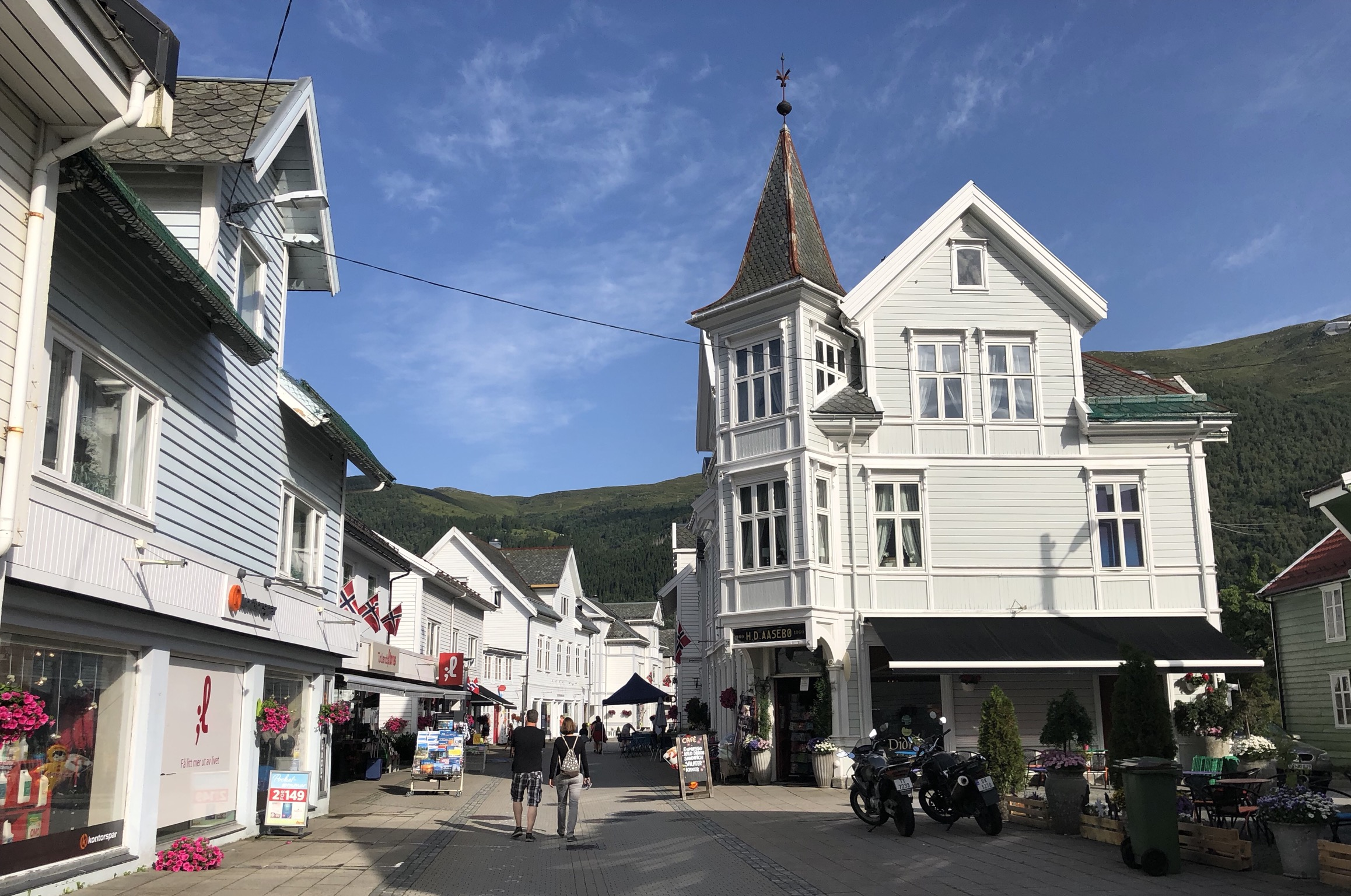
Åsebøhuset located in Eidsgata in Nordfjordeid

Eidsgata is the historic main street and central commercial district of Nordfjordeid in Stad Municipality, Vestland county, Norway. The street is characterized by its continuous concentration of white-painted wooden architecture dating from the late 19th and early 20th centuries. Due to its architectural preservation and historical significance, the area encompassing Eidsgata and the intersecting Tverrgata are listed in the Norwegian Directorate for Cultural Heritage's (Riksantikvaren) register of urban areas of national historical value.

== History and architecture ==
The development of Eidsgata as a cohesive urban space occurred primarily in the mid-to-late 1800s, aligning with Nordfjordeid's growth as a regional hub for military administration, trade, and agriculture. The street stretches approximately one kilometer, forming a pedestrian axis from the waterfront in the south to the historic church grounds in the north.

The buildings along Eidsgata are predominantly two-story, white wooden clapboard structures built in a traditional coastal style. A central architectural anchor of the street is Eid Church (Eid kyrkje), a wooden long church constructed in 1849 following the designs of architect Hans Linstow. Another is Yris Hotel marking the start of the south of the street.

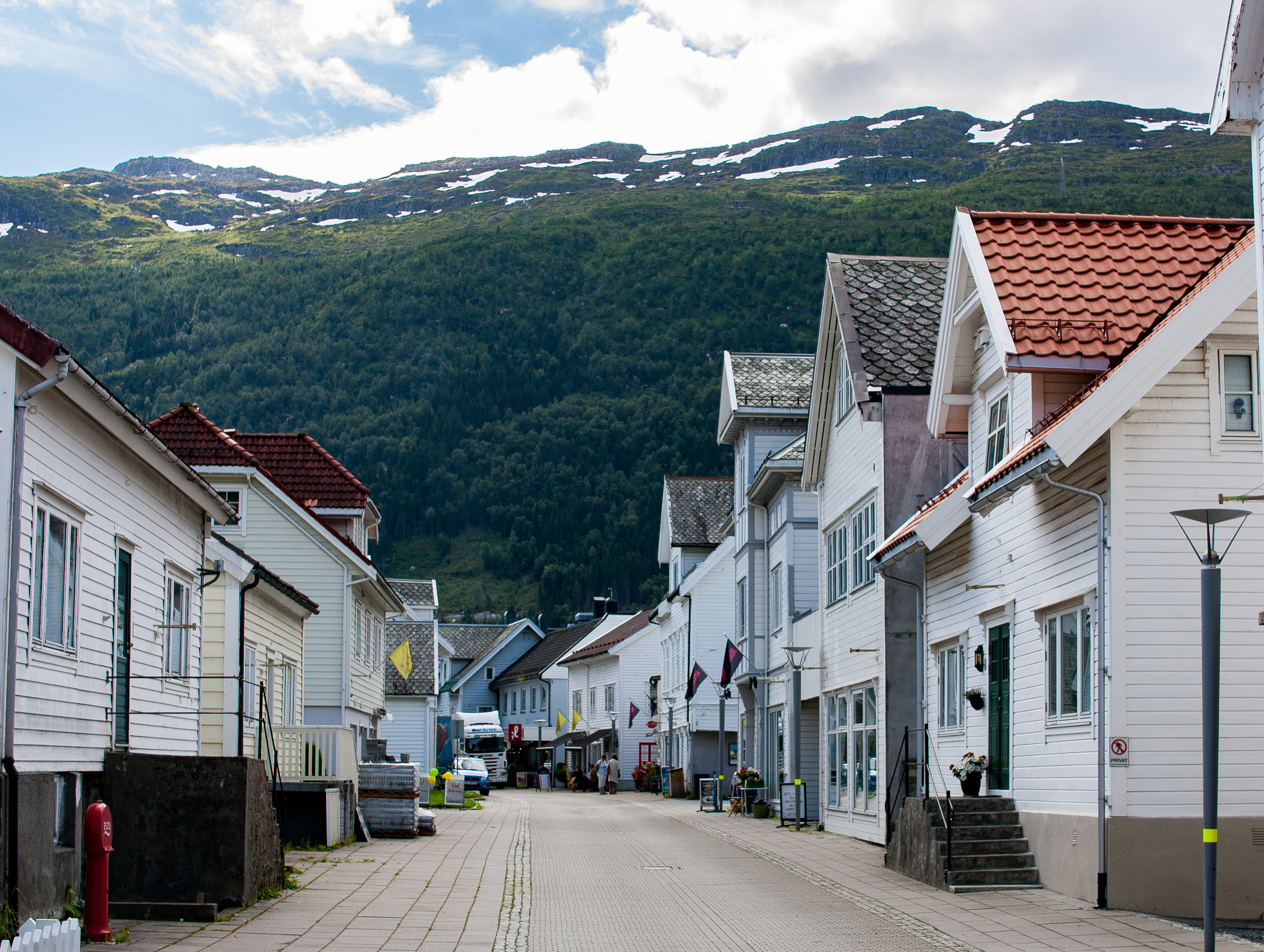
The north of Eidsgata

Another prominent historical building is Kulturhuset Gamlebanken (Eidsgata 10). Originally constructed in 1881 by master builders Rasmus Didrikson Nøstdal and Anders Knutsen Skibenes to house the Nordfjord Sparebank, the building served as a financial institution for over 80 years. Following extensive restorations in the 1990s, the building was converted into a cultural center in 1998. Today, it operates as a regional art gallery, the local tourist information office, and the administrative headquarters for Opera Nordfjord.

== Landmarks ==
- Eid Church
- Kutlurhuset Gamlebanken
- Yris Hotel
- Åsebø-huset: Originally rooted in the H.D. Aasebø general store founded by Didrik Aasebø in 1860. The prominent commercial building seen today, noted for its distinctive architectural tower, was later constructed by his son, Hans Aasebø. It stands as aexample of the large merchant houses built by local farmers' sons who established trade along Eidsgata following the decline of the older trading monopolies at Gjerde.

== Archaeological and cultural context ==
Eidsgata is situated directly adjacent to several major archaeological sites from the Viking Age. The street runs parallel to the Myklebust burial mounds , the 1874 excavation site of the 9th-century Myklebust ship, which is recorded as the largest Viking cremation ship discovered in Norway.

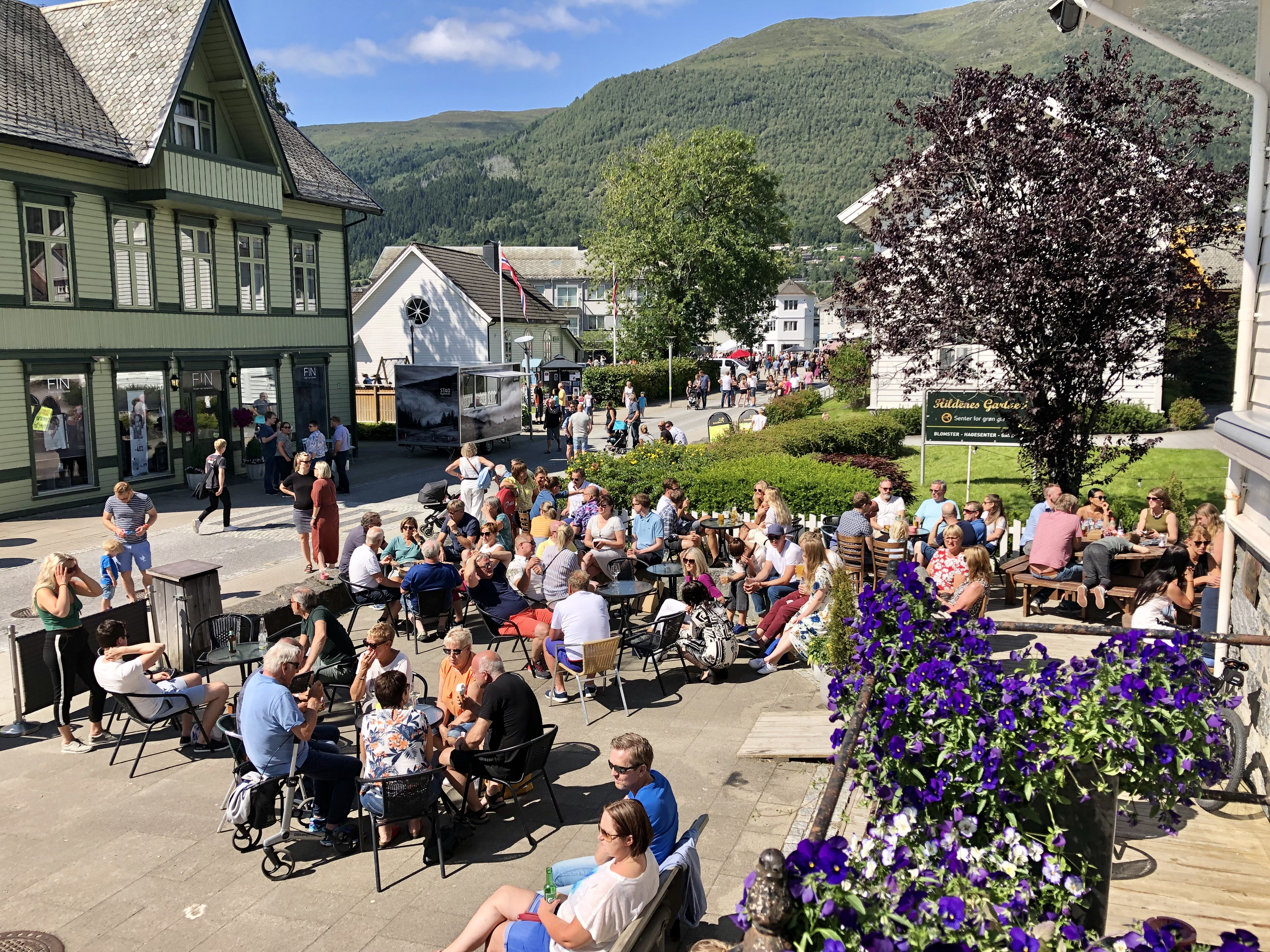
South of Eidsgata facing away from Gamlebanken

To connect the modern commercial district with the historical sites, local authorities established the "Saga Trail" (Sagaløypa), a designated walking path that integrates Eidsgata with the burial mounds, the historic military training grounds (Ekserserplassen), and the nearby Sagastad Viking center.

== Commerce and modern use ==
Today, Eidsgata functions as the primary retail and pedestrian center of Nordfjordeid. The historic wooden buildings have been adapted for modern commercial use, housing a variety of independent businesses, boutiques, artisan workshops, and bakeries.

Because of its direct proximity to the Port of Nordfjordeid cruise terminal, the street also serves as the main pedestrian thoroughfare for international tourists arriving in the village, blending municipal commerce with the region's heritage tourism infrastructure.

The street runs parallel to the modern commercial district of Sjøgata.
