= Eksersisplassen =

Park in Norway

Coordinates: 61°54′30″N 5°59′10″E

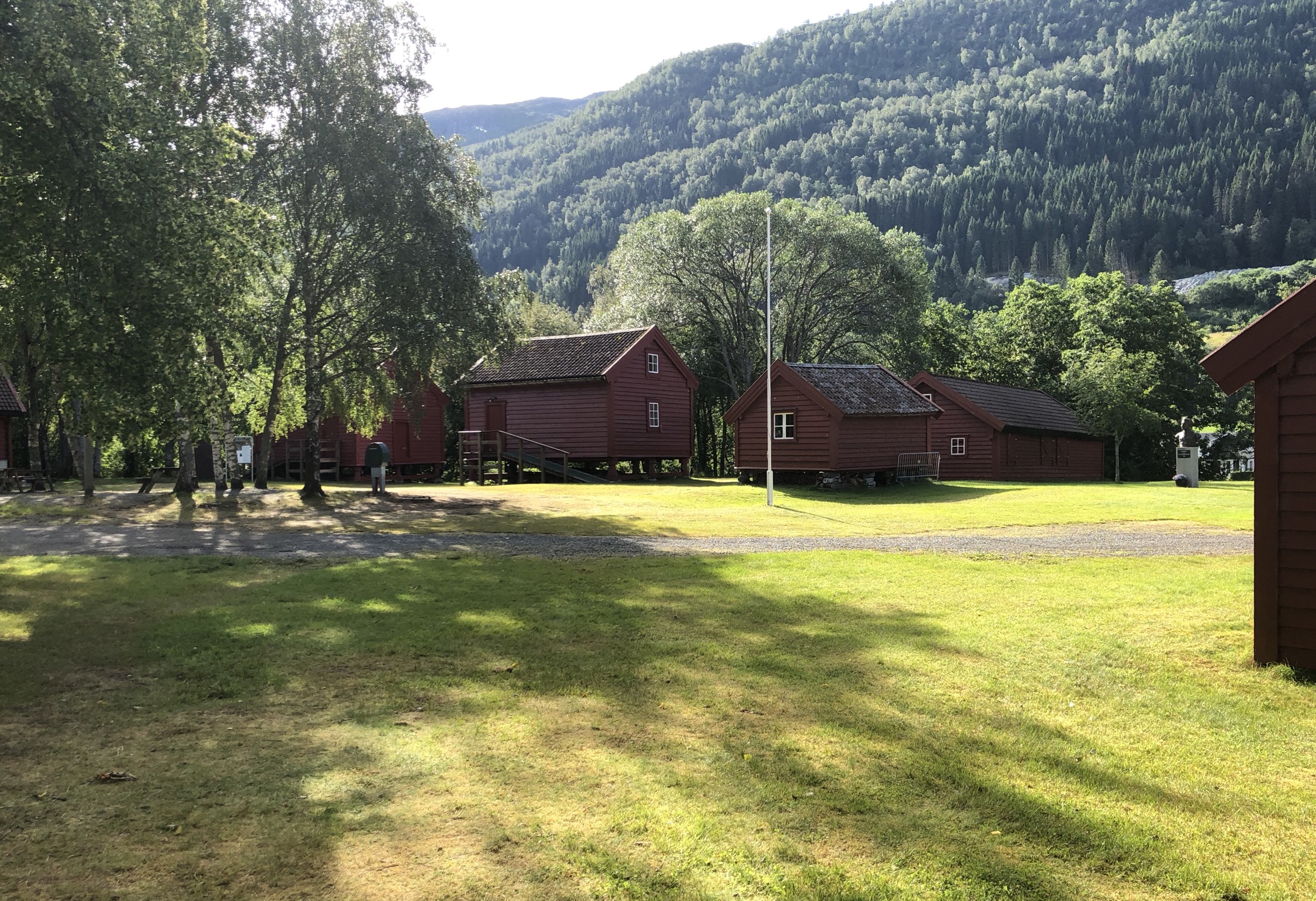
The training grounds

Eksersisplassen (English: The Parade Ground), locally referred to as Plassen or Malakoff, is a historic military training ground and public park located in Nordfjordeid, in Stad Municipality, Vestland county, Norway.

Established in the 17th century as part of the Norwegian army's regional restructuring, it is recognized as one of the oldest military encampments in Norway. Today, the area serves as a designated Millennium site (Tusenårsstad) and is the venue for the annual Malakoff Rockfestival.

== Military history ==
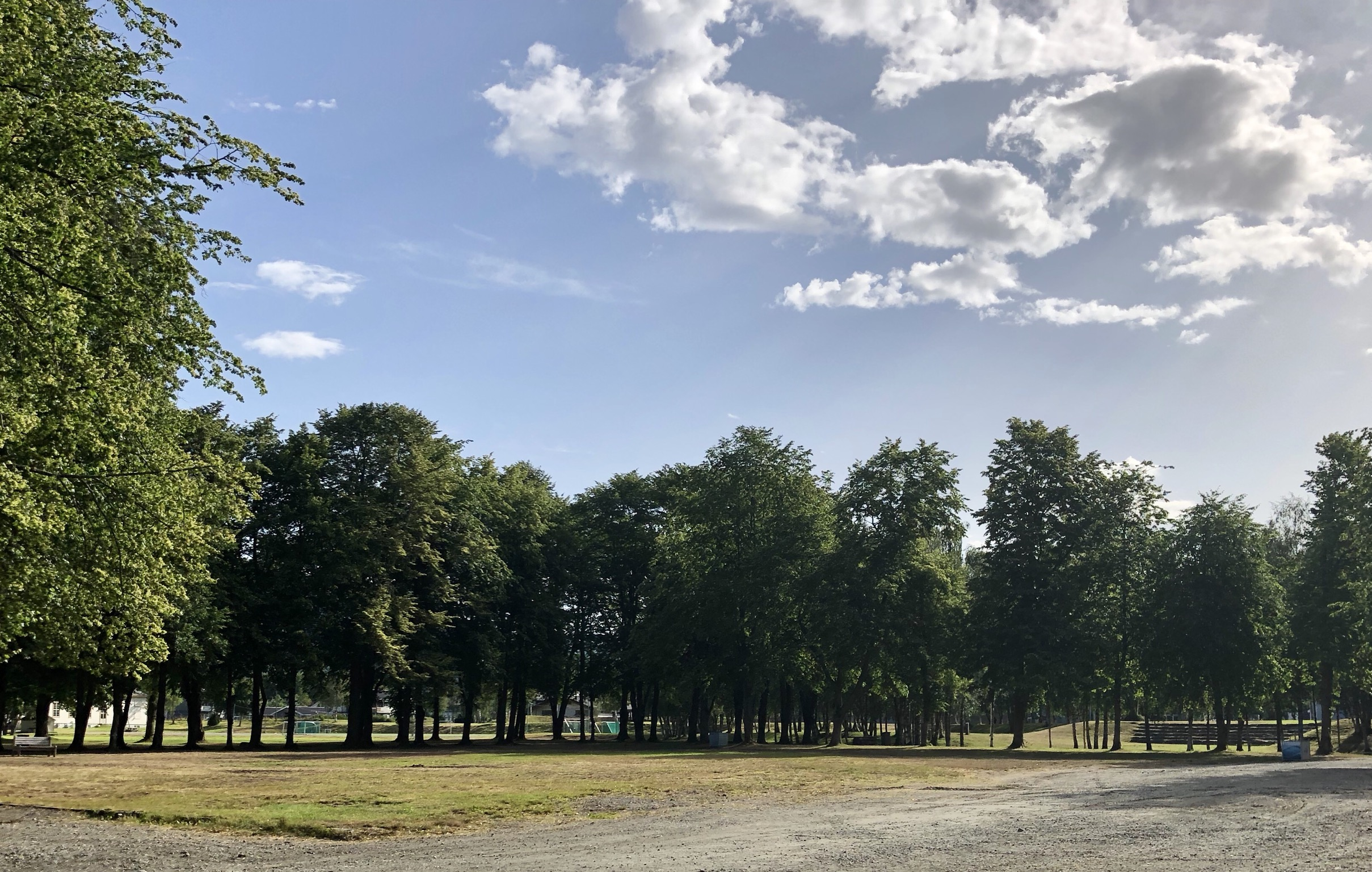
The grounds

The military history of Nordfjordeid began when the site was established as a regional training ground for the Norwegian army. For nearly three centuries, it served as the primary gathering point for conscripts and soldiers from the surrounding regions of Sunnmøre, Nordfjord, and Jølster.

The camp experienced its peak operational period between 1850 and 1920. During the summer months, particularly in June, the village's population would temporarily surge as 1,500 to 2,000 young men arrived for military drills. The area was heavily utilized by the Fjordenes Battalion (Fjordenes bataljon), which was developed into an elite national unit under the command of Colonel Henrik Høyer Holtermann between 1895 and 1901. The military presence profoundly influenced the local economy and culture, as soldiers were often quartered privately on local farms and in the village center.

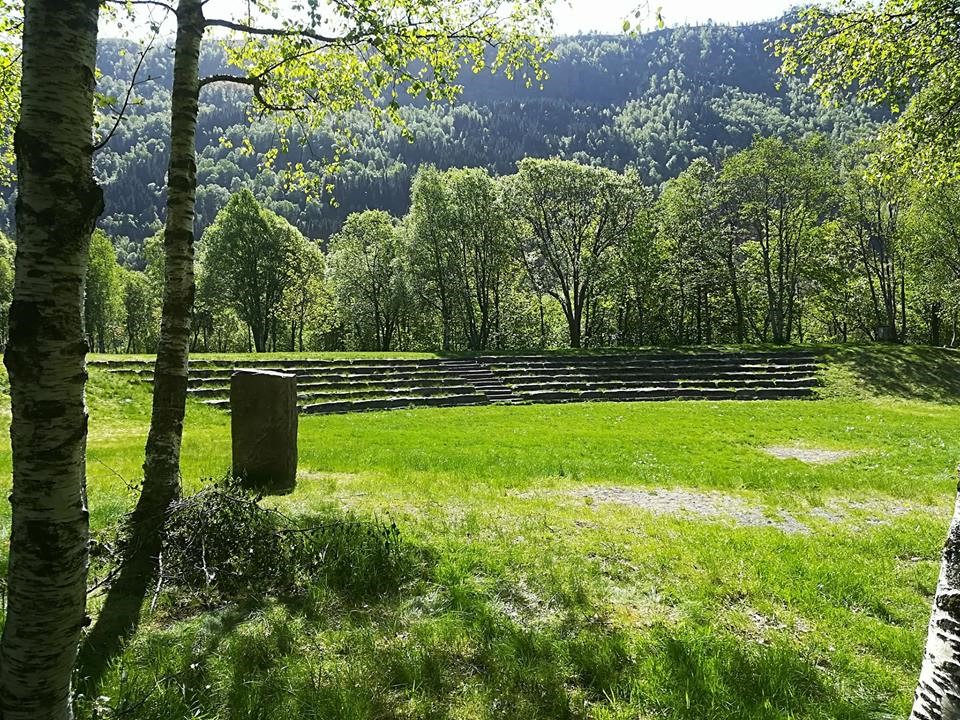
The Amphitheatre

This led to the development of the Eidsgata street in Nordfjordeid.

== Modern use and cultural significance ==
Following the cessation of large-scale military training, the grounds were preserved as a public park and cultural arena, bordered by the Eidselva river. The site remains a central part of the village's "Saga Trail" (Sagaløypa), connecting the military history of the town with its nearby Viking Age archaeological sites.

In the year 2000, the former municipality of Eid designated Eksersisplassen as its official Millennium site. As part of the area's modernization for cultural use, a large stone amphitheater was constructed on the grounds in 2004.

Today, the site is best known nationally as the home of the Malakoff Rock festival. Established in 2003, the music festival utilizes the expansive green areas and historic tree-lined alleys of the old military settlement, attracting upwards of 25,000 to 30,000 visitors annually.

The site's military history is also preserved through the historical musical play Elskhug og Eksis (Love and Drills). Performed biennially by local actors on the grounds, the play depicts civilian and military life on the parade ground during the union dissolution period in the 1890s.

== Monuments ==
The park features several historical markers, including a prominent bronze bust of Major Oliver H. Langeland (1887–1958). Born in Nordfjordeid, Langeland was a military officer and leader of the Norwegian resistance group Milorg District 13 during the occupation of Norway in World War II. The monument was officially unveiled at Eksersisplassen in June 2015.
