= Eid Church (Nordfjord) =

Church in Vestland, Norway

- Eid kyrkje
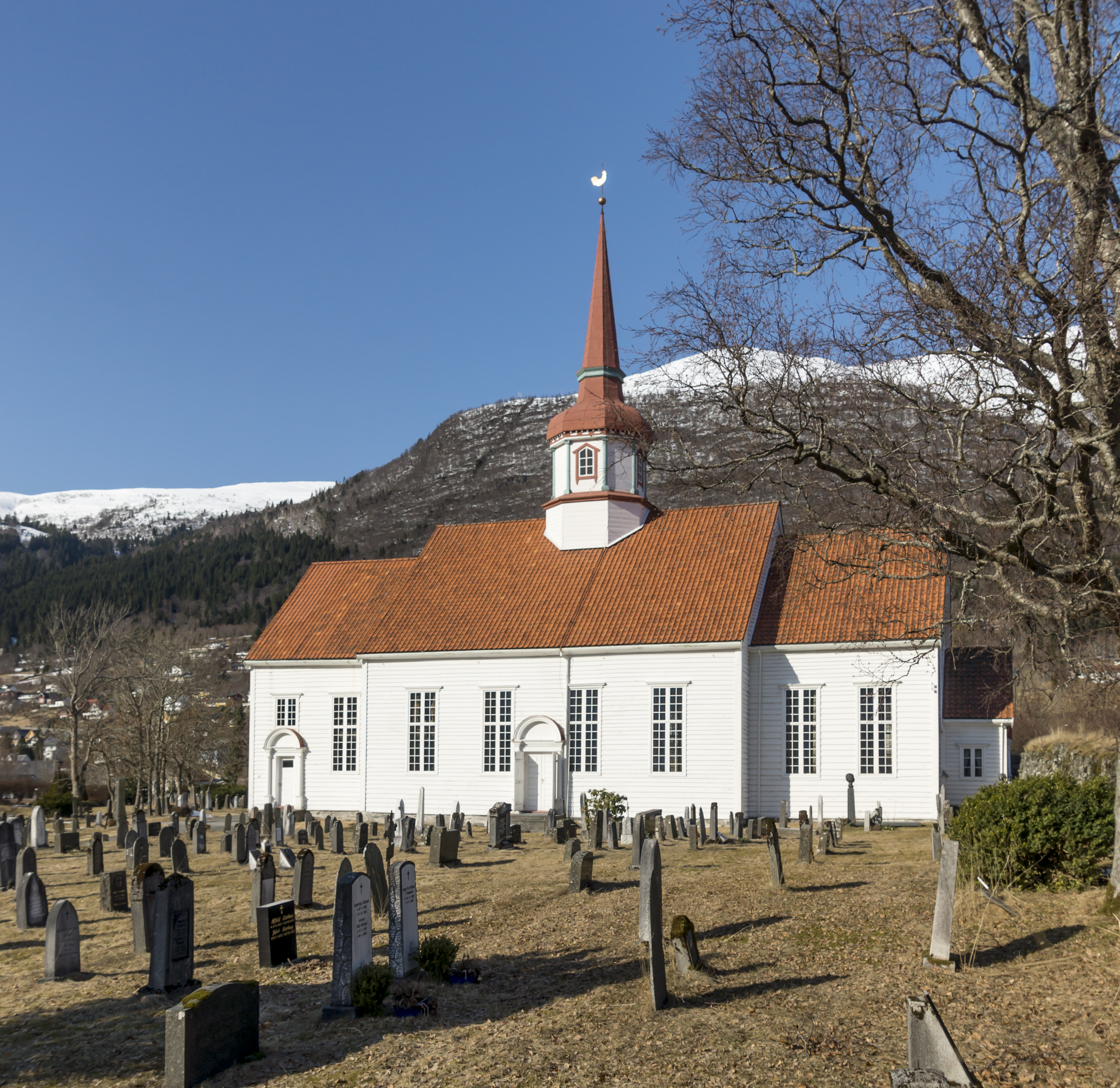
- View of the church
- Eid Church
- 61°54′41″N 5°59′07″E
- Location: Stad Municipality, Vestland
- Country: Norway
- Denomination: Church of Norway
- Churchmanship: Evangelical Lutheran

History
- Status: Parish church
- Founded: 12th century
- Consecrated: 29 Oct 1849

Architecture
- Functional status: Active
- Architect(s): Claus Wiese and Hans Linstow
- Architectural type: Long church
- Completed: 1849 (177 years ago)

Specifications
- Capacity: 550
- Materials: Wood

Administration
- Diocese: Bjørgvin bispedømme
- Deanery: Nordfjord prosti
- Parish: Eid
- Norwegian Cultural Heritage Site
- Type: Church
- Status: Automatically protected
- ID: 84063

Eid Church (Norwegian: Eid kyrkje) is a parish church of the Church of Norway in Stad Municipality in Vestland county, Norway. It is located in the village of Nordfjordeid as the first building of Eidsgata. It is the church for the Eid parish which is part of the Nordfjord prosti (deanery) in the Diocese of Bjørgvin. The white, wooden church was built in a long church design in 1849 by the builder Claus Wiese using plans from the architect Hans Linstow. The church seats about 550 people. This is the fifth church building to sit at Nordfjordeid.

== History ==
The earliest existing historical records of the church date back to 1322, but it was likely built during the 12th century, making it one of the oldest church sites in Nordfjord. The first church building here was a wooden stave church was located at Myklebost, a hill a little to the northeast of the present church location. Not much is known about this church. The church was described as old and prosperous in a letter dated 1336. At some point in the 1300s, it was replaced, likely after a fire. The replacement church was built a short distance away in Mel, just north of the present church. Not much is known about this building either, but it was in use throughout the 1400s and 1500s.

Around the year 1600, the old church building was torn down and a new building was constructed on the present site of the church. The new building was a timber-framed cruciform building with a tower in the center of the roof. The church was renovated in the 1680s, receiving a new floor and ceiling. Unfortunately, the church was destroyed by fire after a lightning strike in 1689. A new church was completed in 1692 on the same site as the previous church. It too was a wooden cruciform church with a very similar design to the previous church.

In 1814, this church served as an election church (Norwegian: valgkirke). Together with more than 300 other parish churches across Norway, it was a polling station for elections to the 1814 Norwegian Constituent Assembly which wrote the Constitution of Norway. This was Norway's first national elections. Each church parish was a constituency that elected people called "electors" who later met together in each county to elect the representatives for the assembly that was to meet at Eidsvoll Manor later that year.

In the spring of 1846, the old church building was deemed to be too small for the congregation, so it was decided to tear down the old church and build a larger church. From May to October in 1849, the new church building was constructed alongside the old church which was torn down in the fall of 1849 after the new church was completed. The new building was a wooden long church that was originally designed to seat about 900 people )but with current fire codes, the number has been reduced). The building was designed by Claus Wiese who based the plans off some standardized drawings by Hans Linstow. The lead builder for the new church was Ole Olsen Løken. The church was consecrated on 29 October 1849 by the Bishop Peder Christian Hersleb Kjerschow. In 1915, a sacristy was built adjacent to the chancel during a major restoration of the building. Electric heat and light were added to the building at the same time. The painter and woodcarver Lars T. Kinsarvik led the interior work of redecorating the nave and choir as well as building a new pulpit and new pews.

On 24 November 2016, the church was broken into and vandalised, causing damages estimated to 1-2 million kr. A suspect was arrested by police the same day and confessed to the vandalism.

== Media gallery ==
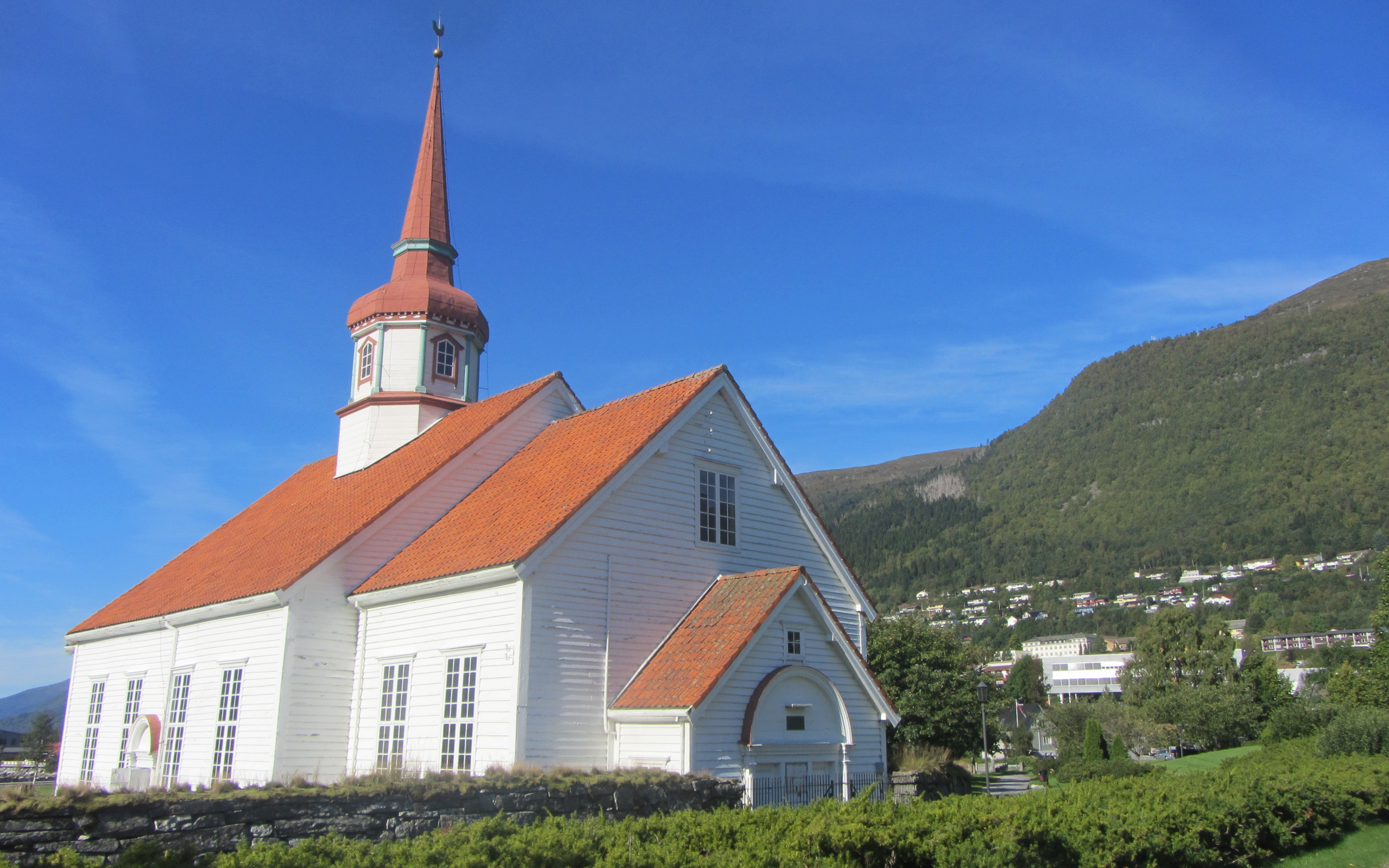

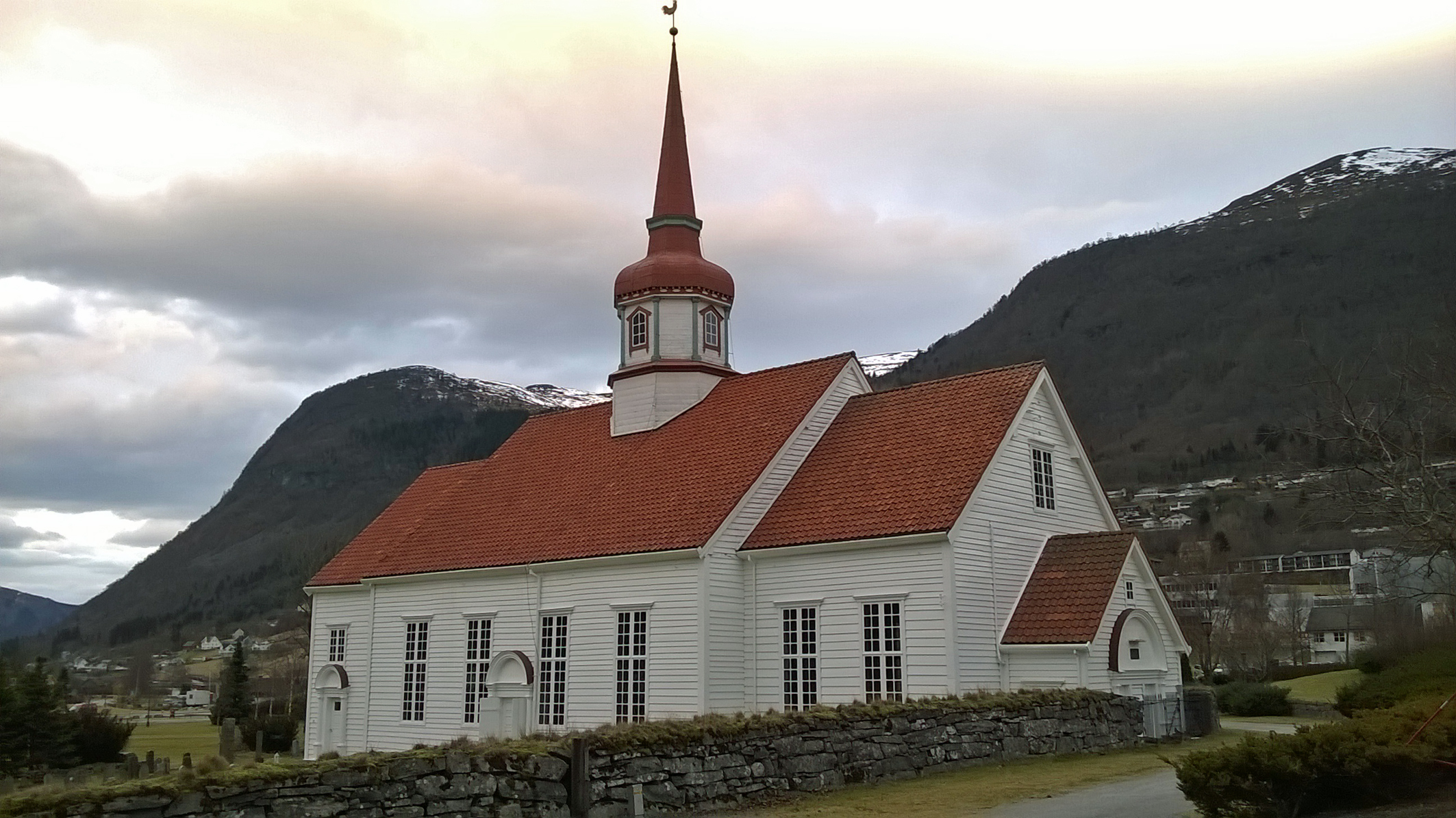

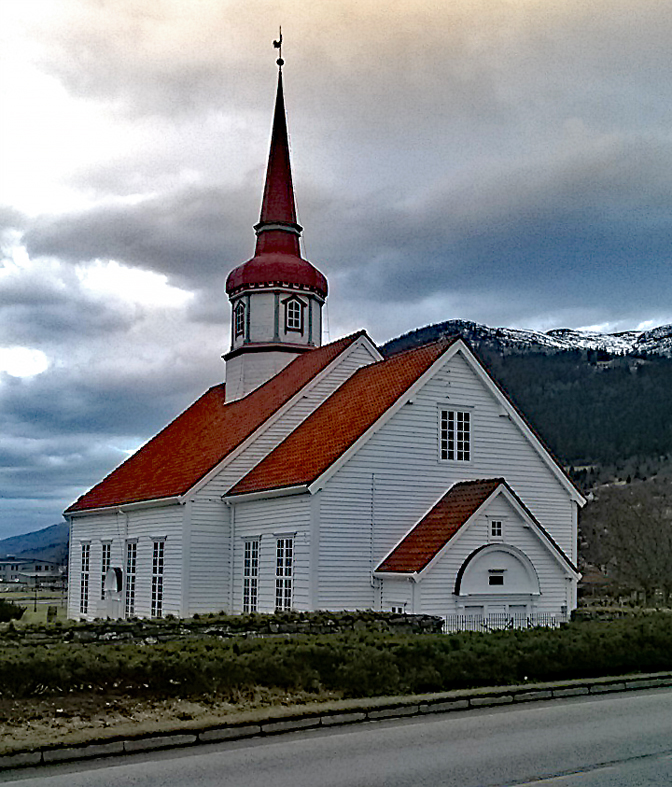

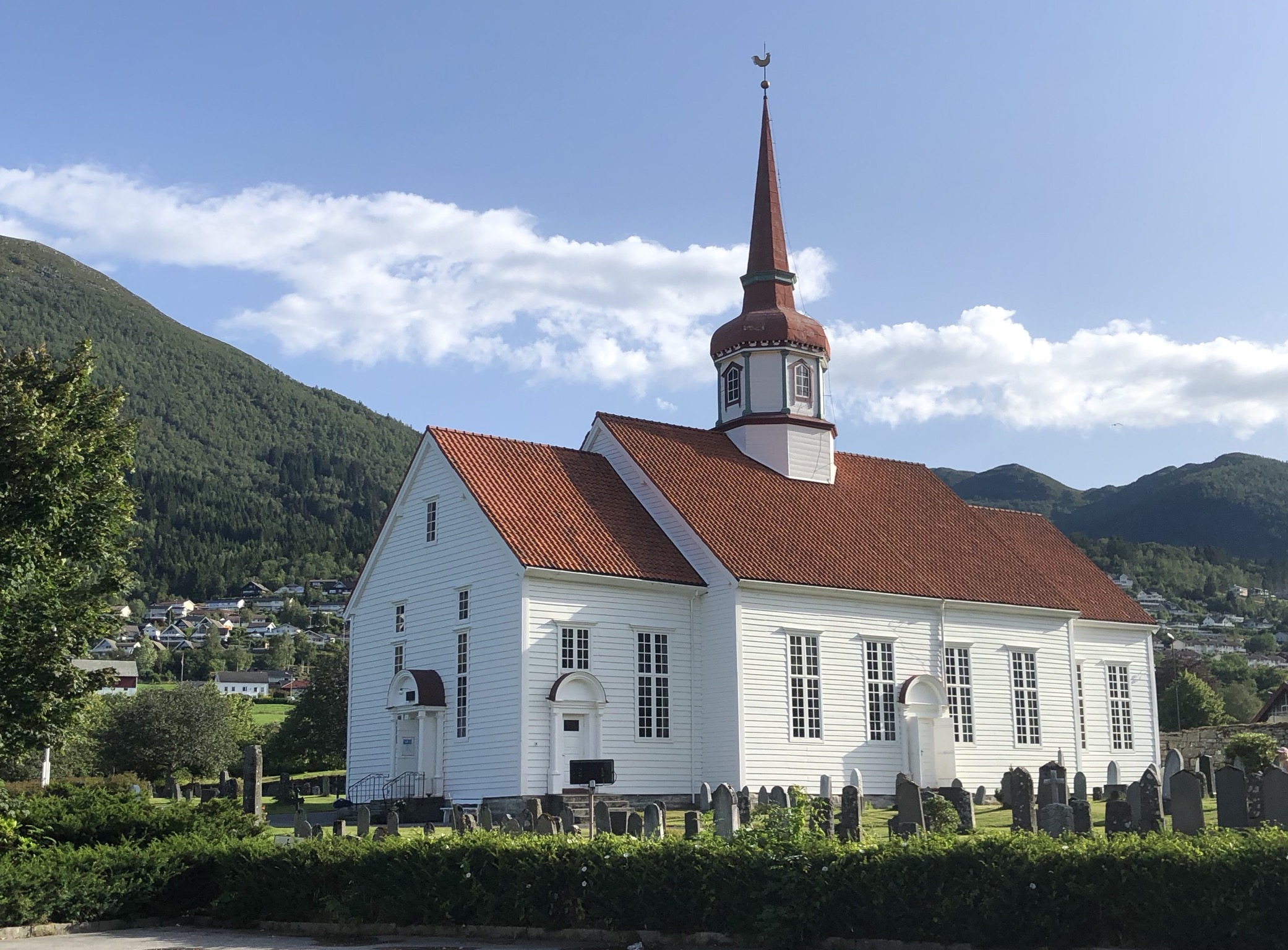

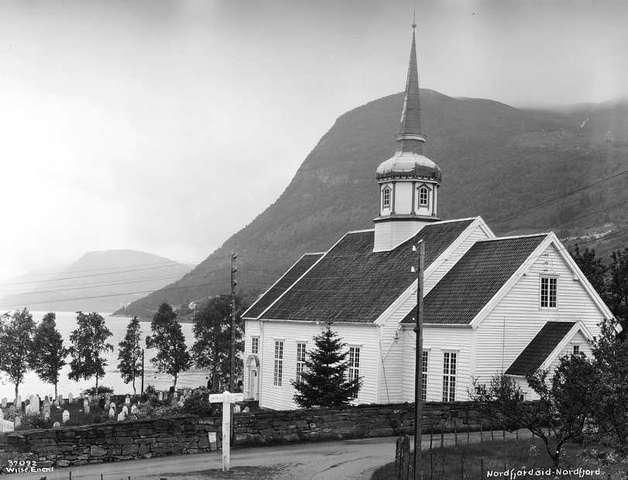

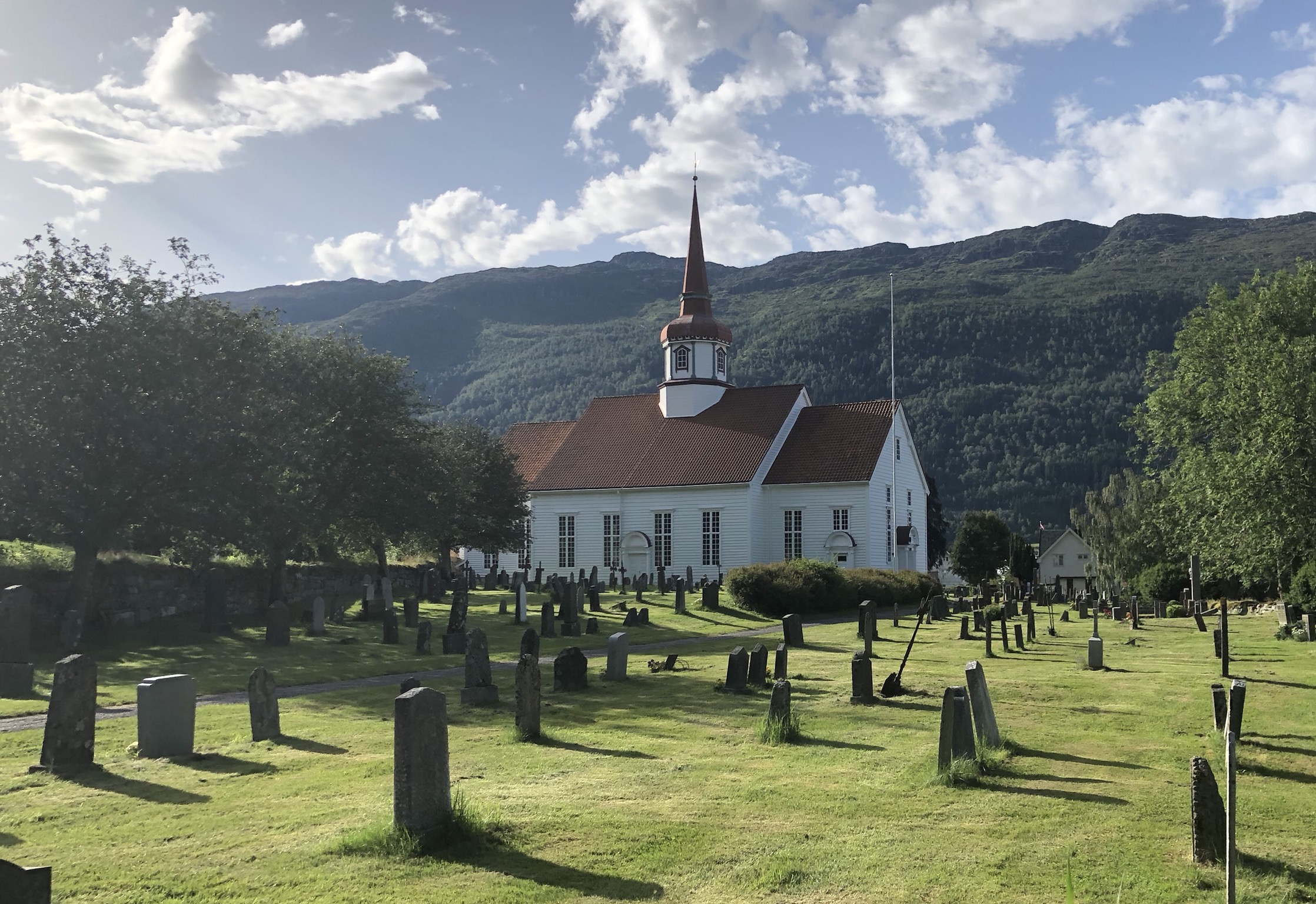

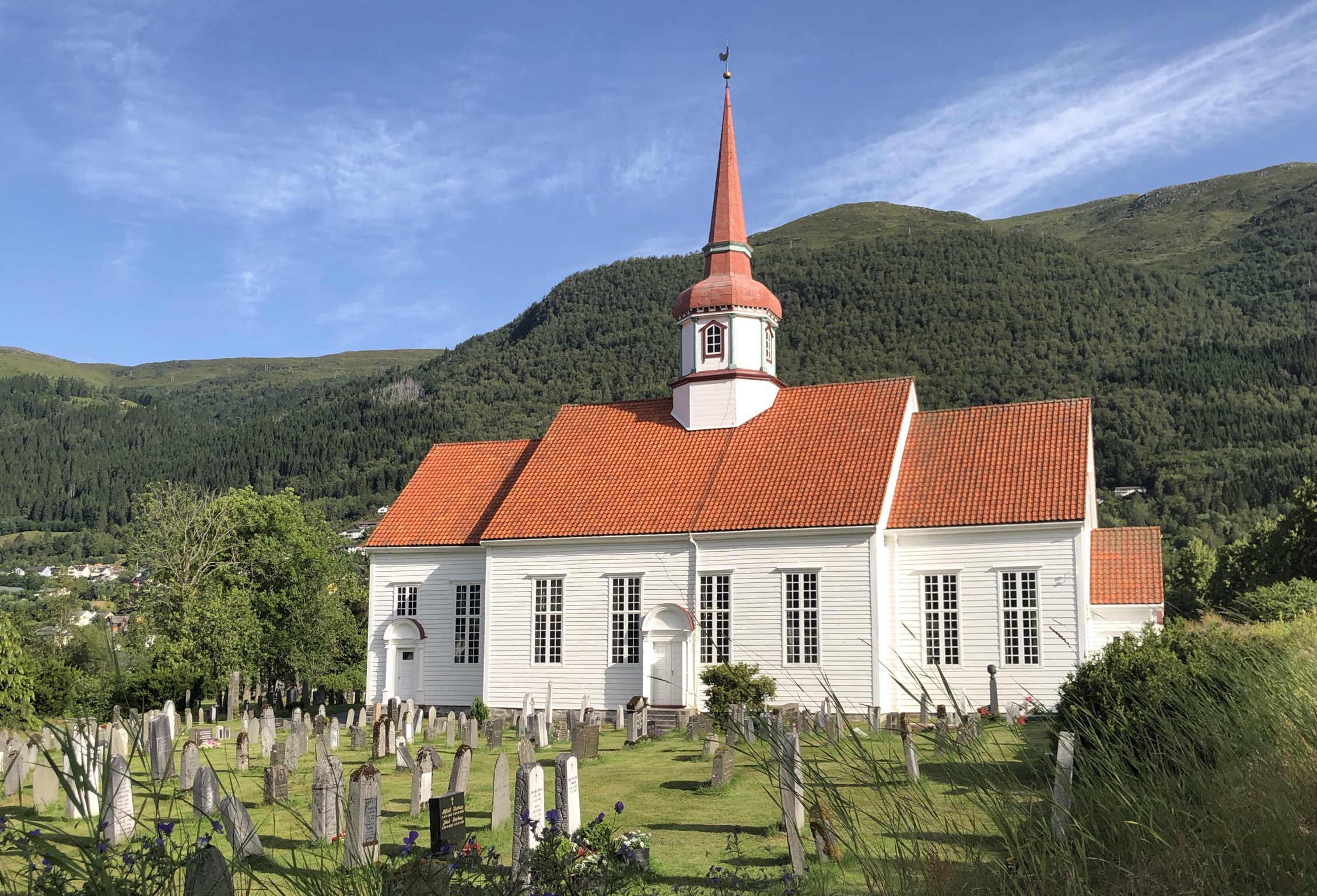

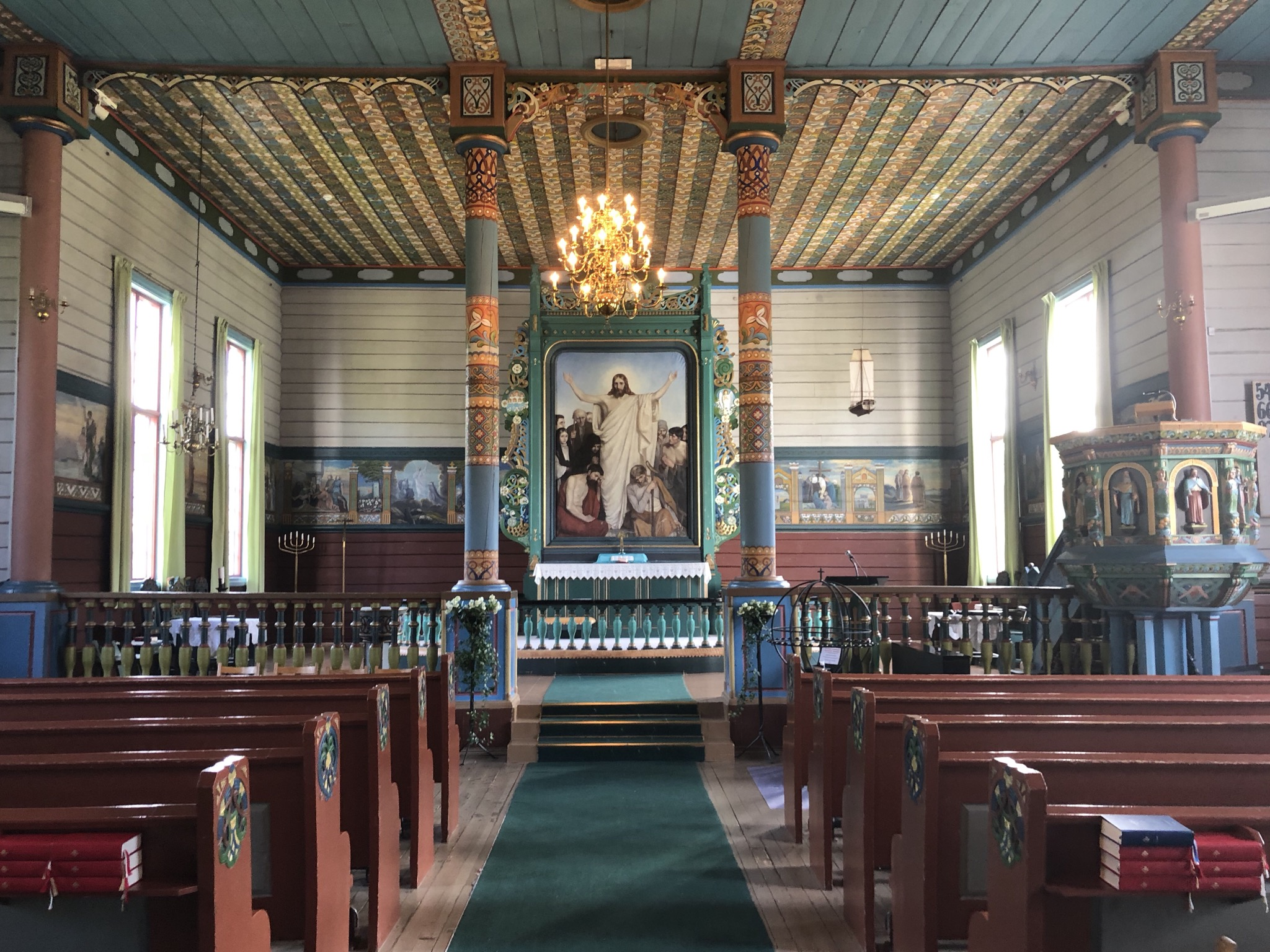

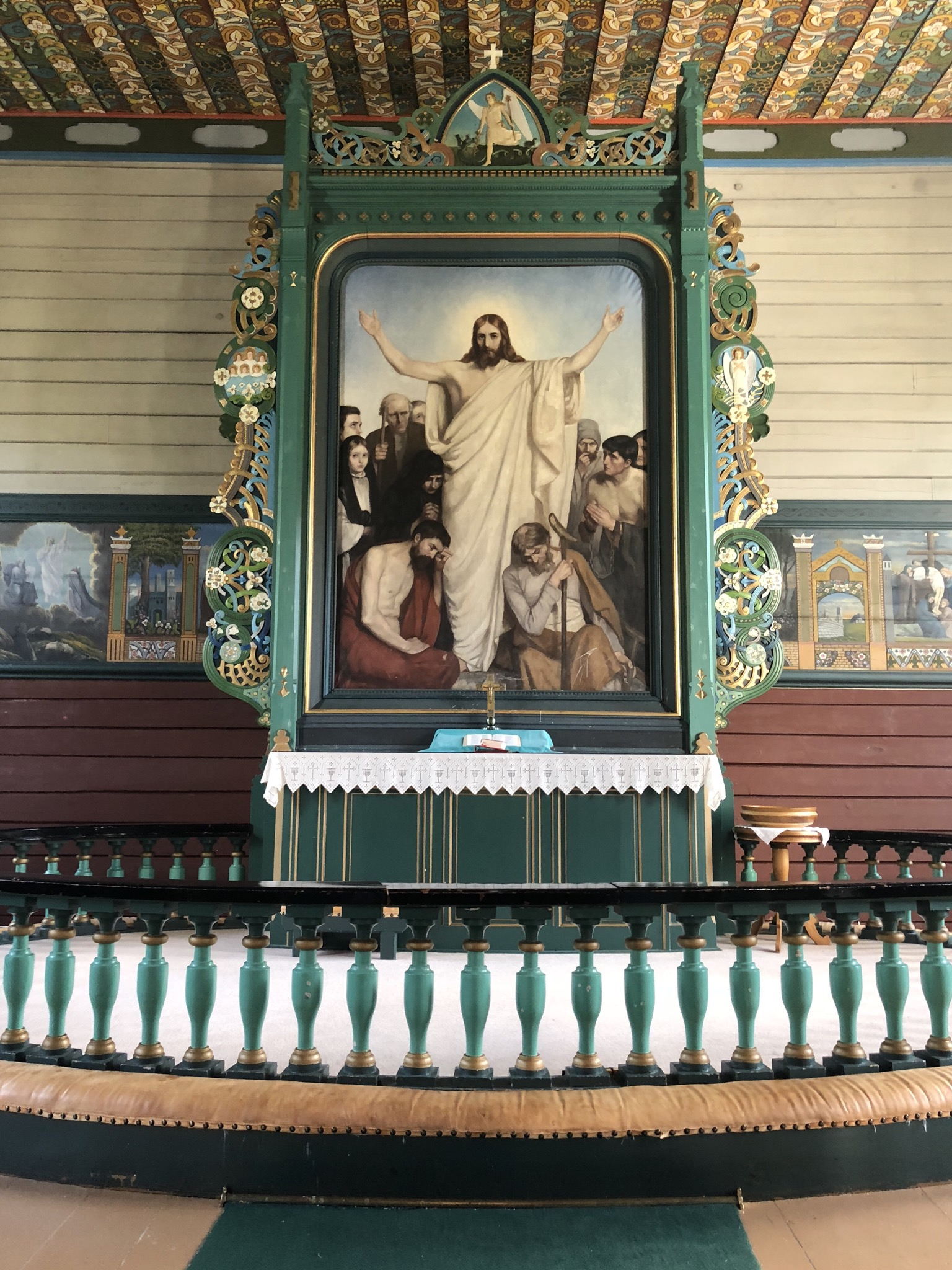

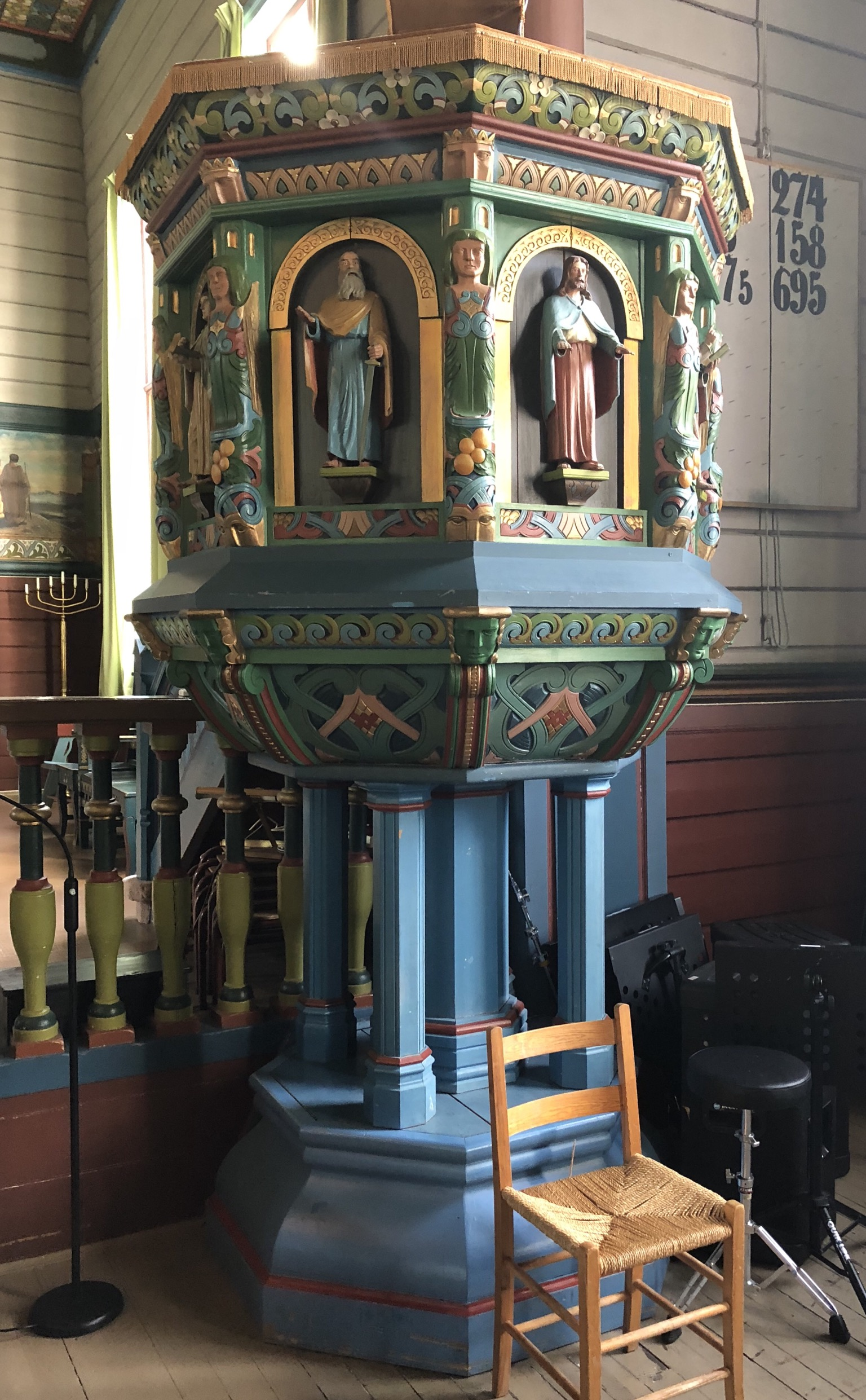

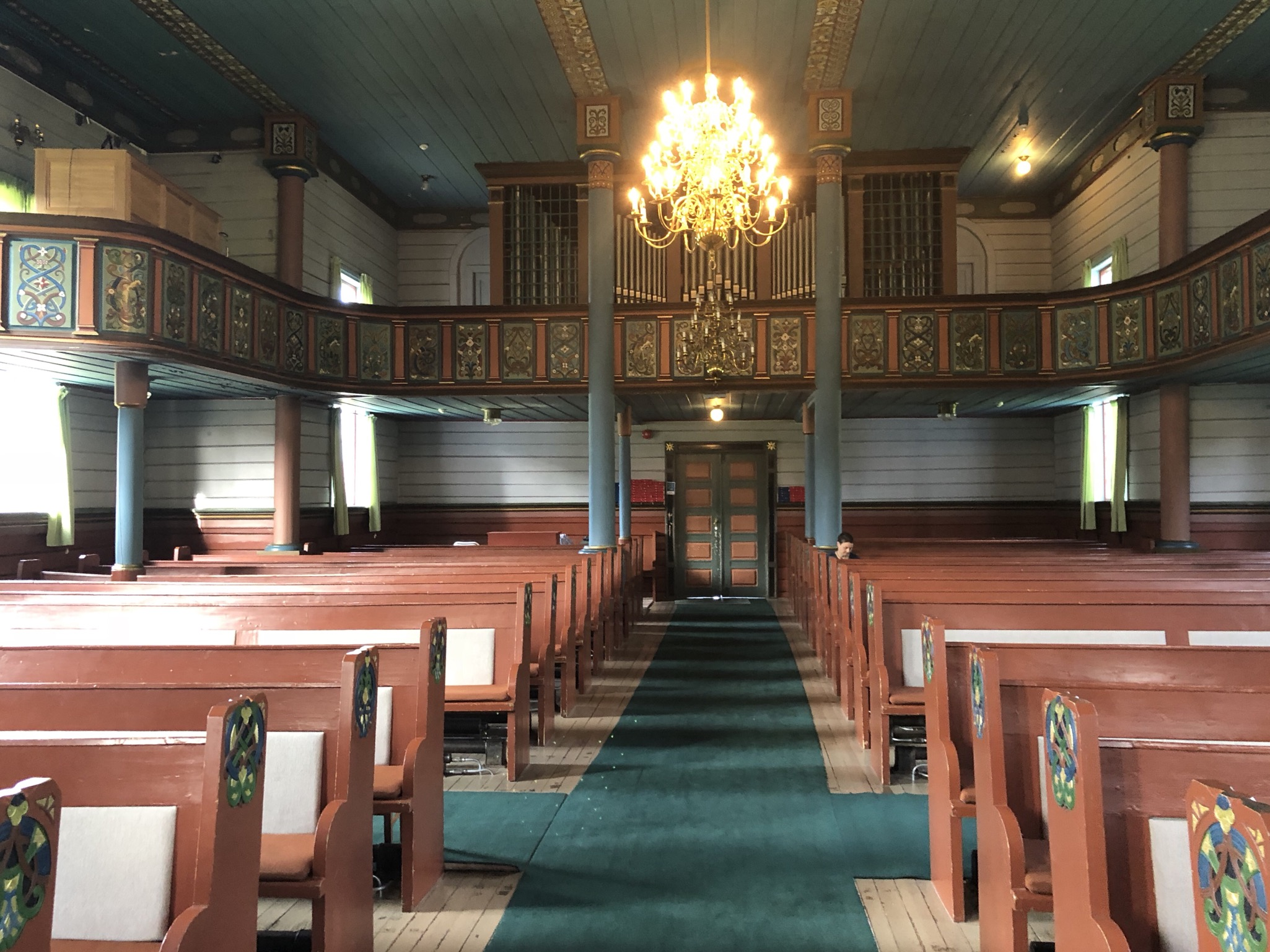

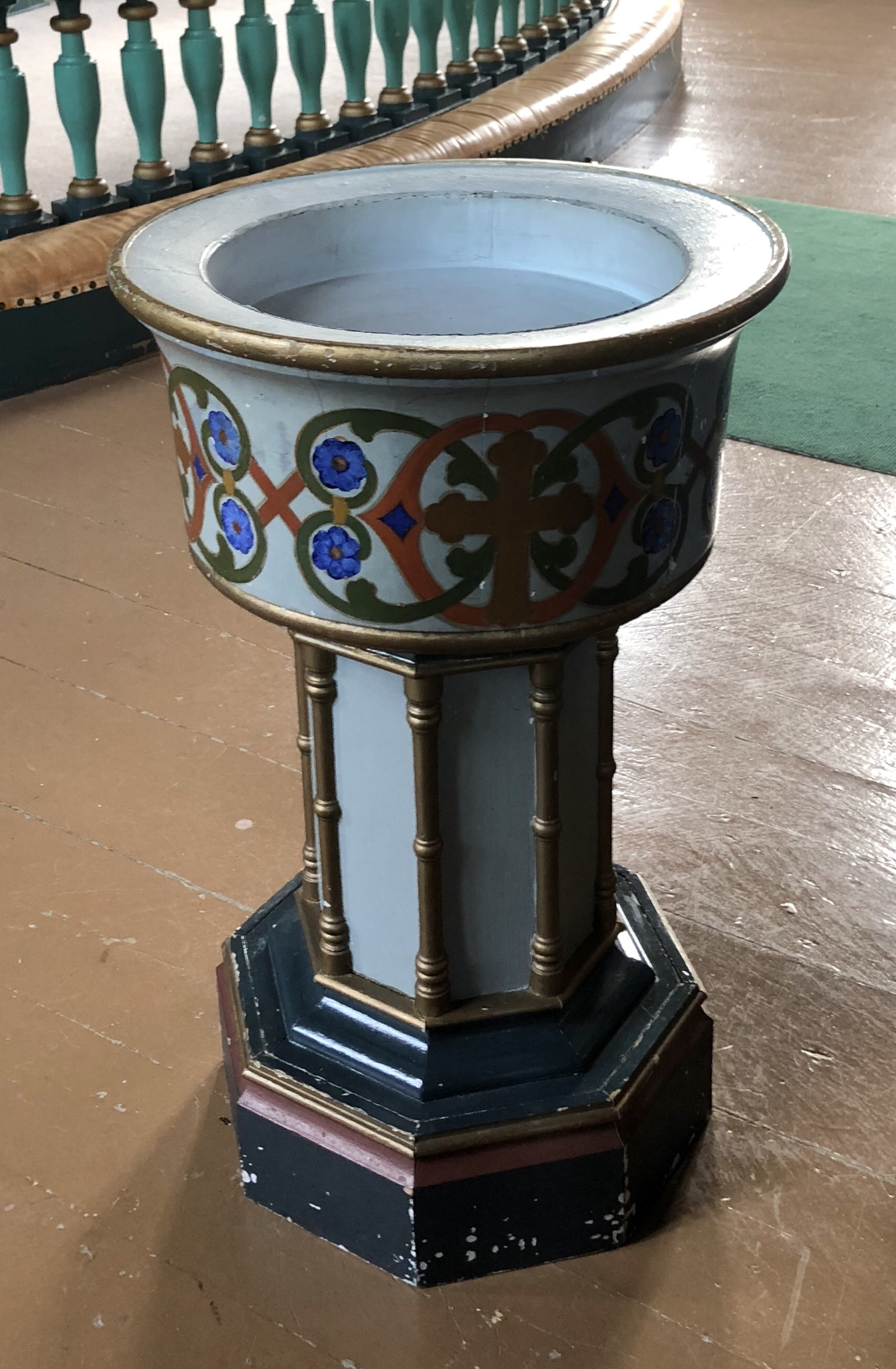

== See also ==
- List of churches in Bjørgvin
