= Vestland County Municipality =

Vestland County Municipality Vestland fylkeskommune
- County
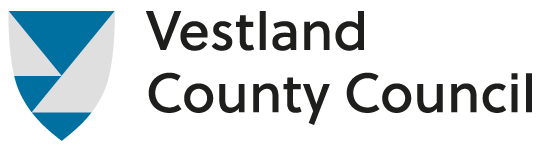
- Coat of arms

- Location in Norway
- Coordinates: 64.0148°N 11.4954°E
- Country: Norway
- Administrative center: Bergen

Government
  - County mayor: Jon Askeland
- ISO 3166 code: NO-46
- Employees: 6,000
- Schools: 46
- Pupils: 23,000
- Roads: 5,547 km (3,447 mi)
- Website: vestlandfylke.no

Composition of the Vestland County Council

Vestland County Municipality (Norwegian: Vestland fylkeskommune) is the democratically elected regional governing administration of Vestland county in Norway. The main responsibilities of the county municipality includes the overseeing the county's upper secondary schools, county roadways, public transport, dental care, culture, and cultural heritage.

== County government ==
The Vestland county council (Norwegian: fylkestinget) is made up of 65 representatives that are elected every four years. The council essentially acts as a Parliament or legislative body for the county and it meets about six times each year. The council is divided into standing committees and an executive board (fylkesutval) which meet considerably more often. Both the council and executive board are led by the county mayor (fylkesordførar).

=== County council ===
The party breakdown of the council is as follows:

Vestland fylkesting 2023–2027
Party name (in Norwegian)	Number of representatives
Labour Party (Arbeiderpartiet)	12
Progress Party (Fremskrittspartiet)	9
Green Party (Miljøpartiet De Grønne)	3
Conservative Party (Høyre)	15
Industry and Business Party (Industri‑ og Næringspartiet)	1
Christian Democratic Party (Kristelig Folkeparti)	3
Pensioners' Party (Pensjonistpartiet)	1
Red Party (Rødt)	2
Centre Party (Senterpartiet)	7
Socialist Left Party (Sosialistisk Venstreparti)	5
Liberal Party (Venstre)	3
Bergen List (Bergenslisten)	2
Independent (Uavhengige)	2
Total number of members:	65

Vestland fylkesting 2019–2023
Party name (in Nynorsk)	Number of representatives
Labour Party (Arbeidarpartiet)	14
People's Action No to More Road Tolls (Folkeaksjonen nei til meir bompengar)	6
Progress Party (Framstegspartiet)	6
Green Party (Miljøpartiet Dei Grøne)	5
Conservative Party (Høgre)	12
Christian Democratic Party (Kristeleg Folkeparti)	3
Pensioners' Party (Pensjonistpartiet)	1
Red Party (Raudt)	2
Centre Party (Senterpartiet)	10
Socialist Left Party (Sosialistisk Venstreparti)	4
Liberal Party (Venstre)	2
Total number of members:	65
