= Port of Nordfjordeid =

Cruise port in Norway

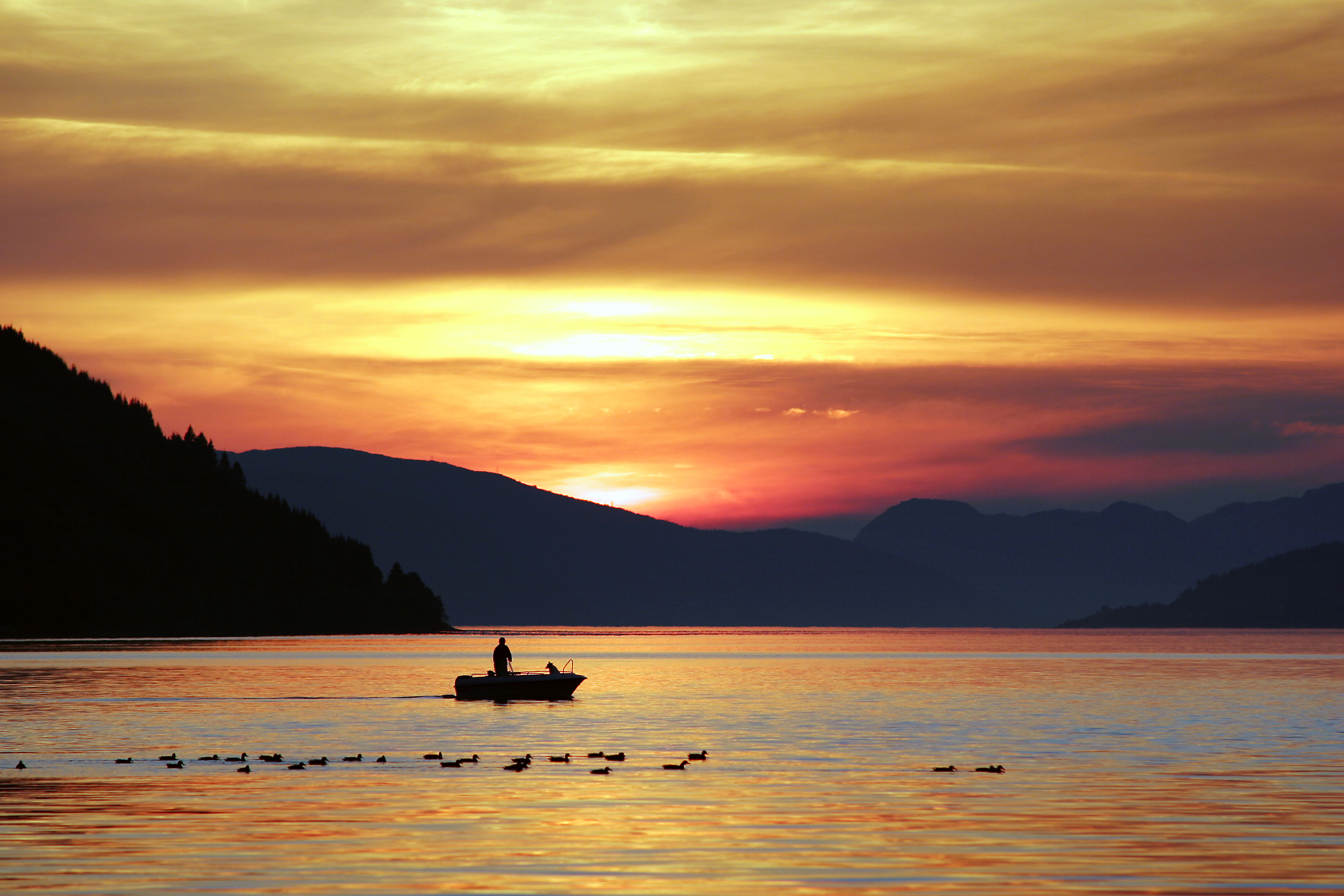
- The fjord view from the port
- Interactive map of Port of Nordfjordeid

Location
- Country: Norway
- Location: Nordfjordeid, Stad, Vestland
- Coordinates: 61°54′24″N 05°59′00″E
- UN/LOCODE: NONFD

Details
- Opened: May 2019
- Operated by: Seawalk Nordfjord AS • Harbor Master: Arild Åshamar • Marketing Director: Jacob Bredesen
- Owned by: Lefdal Invest & SeaWalk
- Type of Harbor: Cruise

Statistics
- Vessel arrivals: 80 calls (2025)
- Passenger traffic: 228,747 (2025)
- Website portofnordfjordeid.no

The Port of Nordfjordeid (NONFD) is a cruise port located at the end of Sjøgata in the southern section of the village of Nordfjordeid in Stad Municipality

In 2025, the port received 80 calls with 228,747 passengers, making it the tenth most visited passenger terminal in Norway.

The port is situated in the Nordfjord region and serves as a point of arrival for cruise passengers visiting nearby attractions.

== History ==
The cruise port began operations in 2019 and is operated by Seawalk Nordfjord AS. In 2016, Stad Municipality granted the company exclusive rights to operate a cruise port in Nordfjordeid for a period of 50 years. It is among the privately operated cruise ports in Norway.

The first call came from AIDA Cruises’ AIDAperla on May 21, 2019. In total the port received 19 calls in 2019.

Due to the COVID-19 pandemic, there was no calls in 2020 or 2021. After the pandemic the port experienced rapid growth with 53 calls in 2022, 67 in 2023, 61 in 2024 and 80 in 2025.

As of 2026 the port is planning a new concrete berth located 6 km west of the current Seawalk in response to growing demand and limiting operating conditions related to the Seawalk. Stad Municipality has been supportive of future expansion in relation to economic potential from the planned construction of Stad Ship Tunnel.

== Infrastructure ==
The port operates using a floating SeaWalk system. The installation consists of a 220 metres (720 ft) long and 4.2 metres (14 ft) wide floating pier. It has a passenger handling capacity of more than 4,000 passengers per hour and can support a load exceeding 300 metric tons.
