= Parental supervision =

Parenting technique

Parental supervision (also adult supervision) is a parenting technique that involves looking after, or monitoring a child's activities.

Young children are generally incapable of looking after themselves, and incompetent in making informed decisions for their own well-being. For this reason, they require supervision, or at least some guidance or advice by their parents or another adult in loco parentis.

== Physical supervision ==
The most basic form of parental supervision is required to keep children from hurting themselves or others; to keep them away from dangerous objects and situations. Small children require continual supervision and care; lack of this constitutes neglect. Some parents are not aware of the need to supervise children, from 0-18. Guidance is needed until the child is aged 25 when the judgment centers have matured. Judgment is needed in making decisions that affect life-and-death decisions.

The legality of the latchkey children's "alone time" varies with country, state and local area. In most of the United States, state and local laws typically do not specify any particular age under 18 when a child can be legally left without supervision. However, some states do have specific age restrictions, for example: children under age of 8 yr/old cannot be left at home alone - in Georgia, Maryland, North Carolina; 9 yr/old - in North Dakota; 10 yr/old - in Oregon, Tennessee, Washington; 11 yr/old - in Michigan; 12 yr/old - in Colorado, Delaware, Kansas; 14 yr/old - in Illinois.

== Media supervision ==
In addition, some believe that children should be protected from violent or pornographic imagery. Some believe that children should be protected from information that challenges the value system that their local culture instills in them. Some jurisdictions enforce these restrictions with legislation.

Where the acceptable boundaries lie in this area is very much a matter of opinion, and a matter of controversy.

The arrival of the Internet has made uncensored access to information available to the home in a way that was previously impossible; for this reason, a number of parents choose to supervise the time that their children spend accessing the Internet. Others choose to use content-control software. Some others regard it as their duty to educate their children in how to use the Internet responsibly, without the need for censorship.

== Parenting Time Supervision ==
Based on issues of protection and safety, a judge may decide that in order for a child to have contact with a parent, a neutral third person must be present during any visitation. This type of third-person visitation arrangement is called Parenting Time Supervision. Supervised visitation allows parents in high conflict or high risk situations access to their children in a safe and supervised environment. The noncustodial parent has access to the child only when supervised by another adult. Supervised visitation is used to protect children from potentially dangerous situations while allowing parental access and providing support for the parent child relationship.

In most of the US states there is a law required that court-ordered parenting plans must set forth the minimum amount of parenting time and type of access (i.e. supervised/unsupervised) a non-custodial parent is entitled to have. According to the state laws and court guidelines, the Custody Supervisor cannot change the court order to make major modifications to the amount of parenting time and access, only the minor changes or clarification of parenting time/access schedules or conditions including vacation, holidays, and temporary variation from the existing parenting plan are allowed.

== See also ==
- Latchkey kid
- Parental coordinator
- Parenting
- Parental alienation
- Shared parenting
