= Fathers' rights movement in the United States =

The fathers' rights movement in the United States is a group that provides fathers with education, support and advocacy on family law issues of child custody, access, child support, domestic violence and child abuse. Members protest what they see as evidence of gender bias against fathers in the branches and departments of various governments, including the family courts.

The movement traces its roots to divorce and alimony controversies in the 1960s. Today, the modern fathers' rights movement generally focuses on issues regarding shared parenting while providing support and public awareness for fathers and children after a divorce or separation.

Different fathers' rights organizations may also advocate for non-married fathers' rights through lobbying efforts or news media outlets. Other advocacy topics include gender bias, both culturally and from within the legal system, visitation, adoption, maternal gatekeeping and parental alienation.

== History ==
The modern fathers’ rights movement in the US emerged with the founding of Divorce Racket Busters in California in 1960 to protest California's divorce laws, which they claimed discriminated against men in alimony, child support settlements and in a presumption of maternal custody. The group expanded into other states, changing its name to Divorce Reform in 1961. With the increase in divorce rates in the 1960s and 1970s, more local grassroots men’s organizations grew up devoted to divorce reform, and by the 1980s, there were a total of more than 200 fathers’ rights groups active in almost every state. These groups focused their actions on what they viewed as gender discrimination in family law by engaging in political activities such as lobbying state legislatures, filing class action suits, picketing courthouses, and monitoring judges’ decisions through “court watches”. The 1990s saw the emergence of new and larger organizations such as National Fatherhood Initiative and the American Fathers Coalition. Several unsuccessful efforts were made to found a national organization to which local organizations could belong. As a result, the movement remains mainly a loose coalition of local groups.

== Federal laws ==
=== U.S. Supreme Court ===
Some states removed decisions of divorce, child custody and child support from Common Law courts and assigned them to courts of equity. Michael Newdow contended that the best interest of the child standard, as currently applied by family courts, violated the Equal Protection Clause of the U.S. Constitution.

=== Bradley Amendment ===
Because the amount of federal funding to states depended on the amount of child support collected by the state, members of the fathers' rights movement allege that federal law (Title IV-D of the Social Security Act) discouraged laws creating a rebuttable presumption for shared parenting.

Parental rights activists claimed that employees of the Massachusetts Department of Social Services (DSS) removed children from their parents without cause. They add that these employees improperly received immunity from the Massachusetts Supreme Court, threatened mothers with the loss of their children to coerce them into divorce and to attend support groups. They claimed that these support groups served the dual purpose of allowing associates of DSS employees to receive government funding for running the support groups, and allowing the DSS employees to gain information used to remove children.

Female opponents at legislative hearings alleged harassment and threats of physical harm by advocates, while members stated that the National Organization for Women and others had possibly fabricated the claims to get attention as part of a plan to paint non-custodial parents as extremists.

== State laws ==
=== South Dakota ===
In South Dakota, Senate Bill 74 was signed into law on March 11, 2014

=== Illinois ===
In Illinois, the following laws co-authored by Jeffery M. Leving were signed into law in 2009:

SB 1628, sponsored by Senator Iris Martinez and in the House by Representative Deborah Mell, accomplished two things: It amended the Paternity Act and other Acts to insure that both parties be informed to their right to DNA testing before paternity can be adjudicated either through a voluntary acknowledgment, court proceedings or by an administrative law judge. It also amended the visitation interference section of the Criminal Code and made it a criminal offense to deny the other parent their right to parenting time or custody time. Previously, only visitation interference was a crime. (Signed into law: August 11, 2009)

SB 1590, sponsored by Sen. Pamela Althoff and in the House by Rep. Sandra Pihos, and which passed unanimously, allows children and non-custodial parents to use electronic visitation technologies such as email, telephone, internet and video conferencing. Illinois became the sixth state to pass Virtual Visitation Legislation which could enable virtual visitation for incarcerated fathers. (Signed into law: August 11, 2009)

HB 4008, sponsored by Senate by Senator Martinez and Rep. Jehan Gordon, included the paternity provisions of SB 1628. It amended the Paternity Act to ensure that both parties would be clearly informed to their right to DNA testing before a voluntary acknowledgment of paternity is signed or a paternity order is entered. (Signed into law: August 14, 2009)

HB 2266, sponsored by Martinez and Rep. Ken Dunkin, amended the visitation interference section of the Criminal Code with the use of terms used in family cases today (i.e. parenting time and custody time). (Signed into law: August 25, 2009)

=== Massachusetts ===
Forensic investigator, Zed McLarnon, proved that Massachusetts family courts used phantom clinical evaluations kept in hidden files, secret hearings without the presence of both parents, and doctored of court hearing tapes. A father's rights activist appealed to a Massachusetts state legislator who wrote an environmental law (named Anti-Slapp) intended to protect whistleblowers from punitive countersuits by corporations and which was rewritten by the Massachusetts Supreme Court to immunize mothers and social workers who file false allegations, noting that fathers have virtually no remedy for false allegations of abuse.

In 2004, some Massachusetts voters were offered a chance to vote on a non-binding ballot question about creating a legislative presumption for joint physical custody. One such question was "Shall the state representative from this district be instructed to vote in favor of legislation requiring that in all separation and divorce proceedings involving minor children, the court shall uphold the fundamental rights of both parents to the shared physical and legal custody of their children and the children's right to maximize their time with each parent, so far as is practical, unless one parent is found unfit or the parents agree otherwise, subject to the requirements of existing child support and abuse prevention laws?" Of those voters choosing to answer the above or similar non-binding ballot initiatives, 84.5% approved.

=== Wisconsin ===
Fathers' rights activists campaigned to change Wisconsin law, which allowed custodial parents to move up to 150 miles (240 km) away from their prior residence without informing the noncustodial parent, to create a rebuttable presumption that moves of greater than 20 miles (32 km) are not in the best interest of the children.

== Awareness ==
- The Father's Rights Movement -- A nonprofit organization (Website and Facebook) founded by Thomas Fidler in 2011 to advocate for Family Law Reform, an Equal 50/50 Parenting Presumption and Prosecution of False Allegations of Domestic Violence, as well as to spread awareness of the various tactics used in today's Family Courts and its ultimate discrimination against men in Custody proceedings.
- Lansing to Washington DC Bike Trek For Equal Parenting -- In August 2007, Robert Pedersen and Rob MacKenzie made a Capitol to Capitol Bike Trek for Equal Parenting. This was MacKenzie's third annual trip. They appeared on Studio 1714. They were awarded a State of Michigan Special Tribute.
- Protest At Lincoln Memorial -- On Friday, 18, August 2007, Jolly Stanesby and Mike Downes of the United Kingdom climbed Lincoln's statue at the Lincoln Memorial, revealed Captain America and Batman costumes, and placed a banner across Lincoln's chest reading "For the Fathers of the Nation; Fathers 4 Justice". Fathers 4 Justice indicated that they intended more protests in the near future.
- Family Preservation Day Rally -- A national rally in Washington DC was held by Parents' and Family Rights Activists on Saturday August 18, 2007. Advocates explicitly compared their movement to the civil rights movement, and pointed to long-held Supreme Court rulings that parents had a right to care for their children, the most recent being Troxel v. Granville. Speakers included Judge Willie Lipscomb Chief Judge 36th District Court Detroit, Michigan, Tim McKyer, Dr. O. J. Shabazz, Evangelist Harlem Church of Christ, New York, NY. and Carol Rhodes - Former Michigan FOC (Friend of the Court) Enforcement Officer, Author Friend of the Court Enemy of the Family She stated that "Families that were bleeding from the pain of divorce and separation were insulted, tricked, lied to, and deceived by persons without adequate training".
- Barry County Equal Parenting Symposium -- This symposium took place in June 2007. Carol Rhodes, Author of "Friend of the Court Enemy of the Family", explained that as a Friend of the Court worker, she was instructed to violate the law and lie to fathers and mothers. Jay Fedewa, Executive Director of Family Rights Coalition, discussed the status of Michigan family law. Lary Holland claimed that Federal Title IV-D Funding obstructs equal parenting. He explained that Title IV-D funding created a financial incentive for the Michigan Friend of the Court and other state child support enforcement agencies to create problems between parents, triggering enforcement actions for which they could collect federal dollars. Holland advocated Title IV-D reform, including income eligibility requirements to focus child support collections on low income children who he stated were being "drowned out" by a focus on collections for middle-income and high-income families. He argued that funding issues were a significant factor in preventing state legislatures from passing equal parenting bills. Michigan Representatives Glen Steil, Rick Jones and Fulton Sheen advocated equal parenting. Robert Pedersen discussed equal parenting and a bike trek for equal parenting.

== Advocacy ==
- Barb Johnson -- Barb Johnson, a litigator and member of the fathers' right movement, unsuccessfully ran for governor of Massachusetts in 2002 on a platform of court reform, the need for judicial accountability - particularly in the family-law courts and the abolition of judicial and quasi-judicial immunity. She was later disbarred for what she described as political reasons and for educating fathers about the improper assessment of guardian ad litem fees by Massachusetts family court judges. She attempted to create judicial accountability and abolish judicial immunity through her lawsuit against the Massachusetts Board of Bar Overseers et al. for acts of defamation and intentional interference with prospective advantageous business relationships associated with her disbarment. In 2009, she published a whistleblowing book—Behind the Black Robes: Failed Justice—containing anecdotes showing some of the courts' tricks and traps for the unwary parties fighting to find justice.
- John Murtari -- John Murtari was arrested frequently for caulking "I love Dom. Senator Clinton Please Help Us" and similar messages on the sidewalk of the Hanley Federal Building in Syracuse, NY. Murtari tried unsuccessfully for years to meet with Senator Hillary Clinton, who maintained offices in the Building. He previously held a 6-month long hunger strike in jail.

== Media portrayals ==
Members of the fathers' rights movement criticized a 2005 New York Times Sunday Magazine article that began with the words, “…custody determinations are traditionally based on what’s in ‘the child’s best interest.’ But some fathers are now arguing – and agitating – for rights and interests of their own,” for creating a false dichotomy between children's best interests and fathers' rights.

About a Public Broadcasting Services (PBS) documentary about children and divorce, stating members commented that unlike a previous PBS documentary, the show was balanced, but portrayed the movement as promoting conflict, adding that the average viewer did not distinguish conflict in the public sphere from conflict in the home, which could hurt children.

Members also protested a Boston Globe article about a case in which a father successfully prevented a mother from moving children 70 miles away to another state. According to the campaigners, the article inappropriately linked the mixed feelings of the children to their inability to relocate with their mother and to the shared parenting arrangement rather than to divorce, adding that the reporter questioned the children about their living situation and thus exacerbated the conflicts felt by the children.

== See also ==
- Fathers' rights movement
- Fathers' rights movement by country
- Putative father registry
- Paternity fraud
- Shared parenting
- Contact (law)
- Gatekeeper parent
- Parental alienation
- Putative father registry
