= Parenting =

Process of raising a child

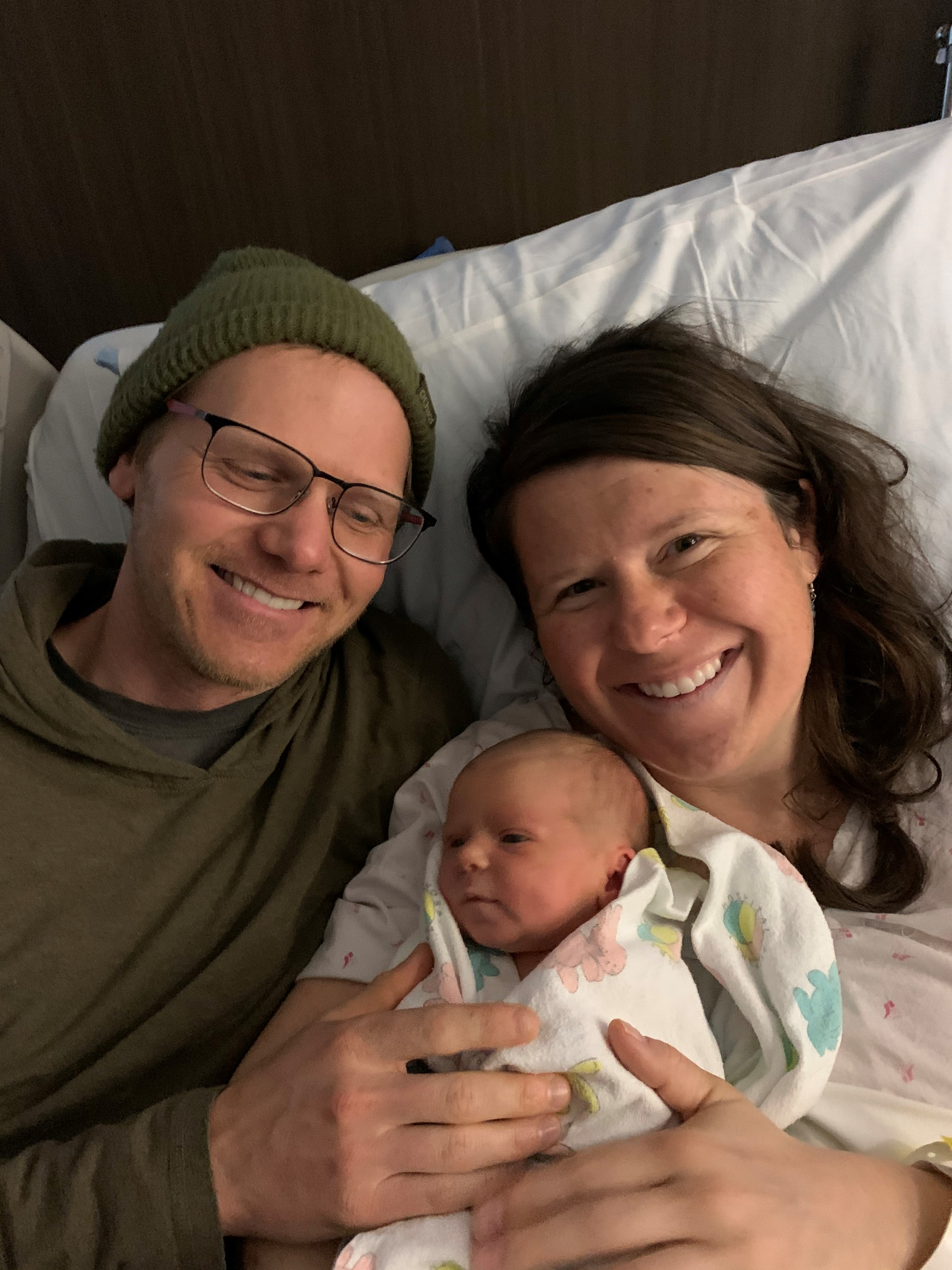
A father and a mother holding their infant

Parenting or child rearing promotes and supports the physical, cognitive, social, emotional, and educational development from infancy to adulthood. Parenting refers to the intricacies of raising a child and not exclusively for a biological relationship.

The most common care providers in parenting are the biological parents of the child in question. However, a care provider may be an older sibling, step-parent, grandparent, legal guardian, aunt, uncle, other family members, or a family friend. Governments and society may also have a role in child-rearing or upbringing. In many cases, orphaned or abandoned children receive parental care from non-parent or non-blood relations. Others may be adopted, raised in foster care, or placed in an orphanage.

Parenting styles vary by historical period, culture, social class, personal preferences, and other social factors. There is not necessarily a single 'correct' parenting style for raising a child, since parenting styles can affect children differently depending on their circumstances and temperament. Additionally, research supports that parental history, both in terms of their own attachments and parental psychopathology, particularly in the wake of adverse experiences, can strongly influence parental sensitivity and child outcomes. Parenting may have long-term impacts on adoptive children as well, as recent research has shown that warm adoptive parenting is associated with reduced internalizing and externalizing problems of the adoptive children over time.

== Styles ==
A parenting style is indicative of the overall emotional climate in the home. Developmental psychologist Diana Baumrind proposed three main parenting styles in early child development: authoritative, authoritarian, and permissive. These parenting styles were later expanded to four to include an uninvolved style. These four styles involve combinations of acceptance and responsiveness, and also involve demand and control. Research has found that parenting style is significantly related to a child's subsequent mental health and well-being. In particular, authoritative parenting is positively related to mental health and satisfaction with life, and authoritarian parenting is negatively related to these variables. With authoritarian and permissive parenting on opposite sides of the spectrum, most conventional modern models of parenting fall somewhere in between. Although it is influential, Baumrind's typology has received significant criticism for containing overly broad categorizations and an imprecise and overly idealized description of authoritative parenting.

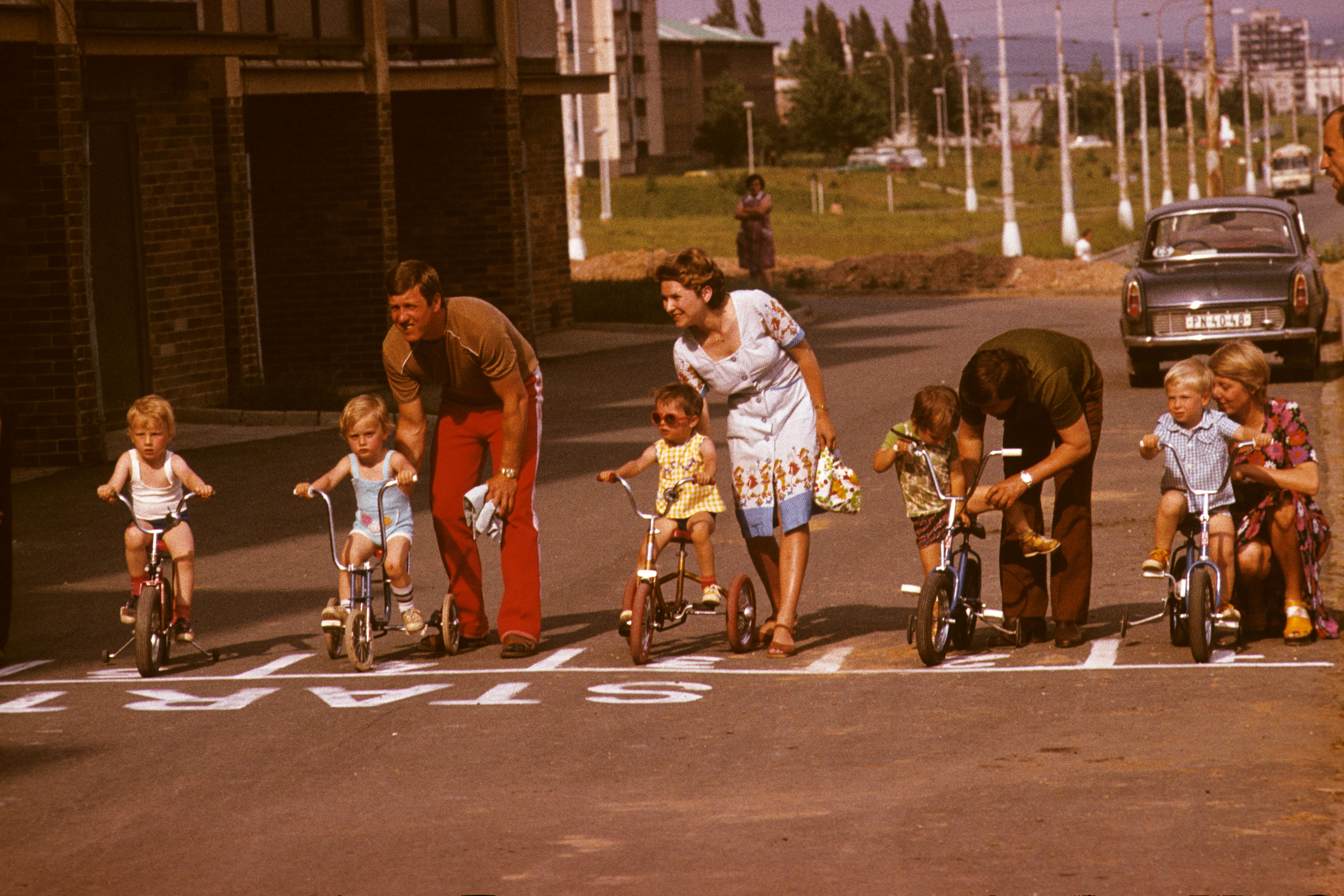
Parents support their children on their bikes in the eighties in Czechoslovakia.

Social class, wealth, culture and income have a very strong impact on what methods of child rearing parents use. Cultural values play a major role in how a parent raises their child. However, parenting is always evolving, as times, cultural practices, social norms, and traditions change. Studies on these factors affecting parenting decisions have shown just that.

In psychology, the parental investment theory suggests that basic differences between males and females in parental investment have great adaptive significance and lead to gender differences in mating propensities and preferences.

=== Authoritative parenting ===
Described by Baumrind as the "just right" style, authoritative parenting combines medium level demands on the child and a medium level responsiveness from the parents. Authoritative parents rely on positive reinforcement and infrequent use of punishment. Parents are more aware of a child's feelings and capabilities and support the development of a child's autonomy within reasonable limits. There is a give-and-take atmosphere involved in parent-child communication, and both control and support are balanced. Some research has shown that this style of parenting is more beneficial than the too-hard authoritarian style or the too-soft permissive style. These children score higher in terms of competence, mental health, and social development than those raised in permissive, authoritarian, or neglectful homes. However, Dr. Wendy Grolnick has critiqued Baumrind's use of the term "firm control" in her description of authoritative parenting and argued that there should be clear differentiation between coercive power assertion (which is associated with negative effects on children) and the more positive practices of structure and high expectations.

=== Authoritarian parenting ===
Authoritarian parents are very rigid and strict. High demands are placed on the child, but there is little responsiveness to them. Parents who practice authoritarian-style parenting have a non-negotiable set of rules and expectations strictly enforced and require rigid obedience. When the rules are not followed, punishment is often used to promote and ensure future compliance. There is usually no explanation of punishment except that the child is in trouble for breaking a rule. This parenting style is strongly associated with corporal punishment, such as spanking. This type of parenting seems to be seen more often in working-class families than in the middle class. In 1983, Diana Baumrind found that children raised in an authoritarian-style home were less cheerful, moodier, and more vulnerable to stress. In many cases, these children also demonstrated passive hostility. This parenting style can negatively impact the educational success and career path, while a firm and reassuring parenting style impact positively.

=== Permissive parenting ===
Permissive parenting has become a more popular parenting method for middle-class families than working-class families roughly since the end of WWII. In these settings, a child's freedom and autonomy are highly valued, and parents rely primarily on reasoning and explanation. Parents are undemanding, and thus there tends to be little if any punishment or explicit rules in this parenting style. These parents say that their children are free from external constraints and tend to be highly responsive to whatever it is that the child wants. Children of permissive parents are generally happy but sometimes show low levels of self-control and self-reliance because they lack structure at home. Author Alfie Kohn criticized the study and categorization of permissive parenting, arguing that it serves to "blur the differences between 'permissive' parents who were really just confused and those who were deliberately democratic."

=== Uninvolved parenting ===
An uninvolved or neglectful parenting style is when parents are often emotionally or physically absent. They have little to no expectations from the child and regularly have no communication. They are not responsive to a child's needs and have little to no behavioral expectations. They may consider their children to be "emotionally priceless" and may not engage with them and believe they are giving the child its personal space. If present, they may provide what the child needs for survival with little to no engagement. There is often a large gap between parents and children with this parenting style. Children with little or no communication with their own parents tend to be victimized by other children and may exhibit deviant behavior themselves. Children of uninvolved parents suffer in social competence, academic performance, psychosocial development, and problematic behavior.

=== Intrusive parenting ===
Intrusive parenting is when parents use "parental control and inhibition of adolescents' thoughts, feelings, and emotional expression through the use of love withdrawal, guilt induction, and manipulative tactics" for protecting them from the possible pitfalls, without knowing it can deprive/disturb the adolescents' development and growth period. Intrusive parents may try to set unrealistic expectations on their children by overestimating their intellectual capability and underestimating their physical capability or developmental capability, like enrolling them into more extracurricular activities or enrolling them into certain classes without understanding their child's passion, and it may eventually lead children not taking ownership of activities or develop behavioral problems. Children, especially adolescents might become victims and be "unassertive, avoid confrontation, being eager to please others, and suffer from low self-esteem." They may compare their children to others, like friends and family, and also force their child to be codependent—to a point where the children feel unprepared when they go into the world. Research has shown that this parenting style can lead to "greater under-eating behaviors, risky cyber behaviors, substance use, and depressive symptoms among adolescents."

=== Unconditional parenting ===
Unconditional parenting refers to a parenting approach that is focused on the whole child, emphasizes working with a child to solve problems, and views parental love as a gift. It contrasts with conditional parenting, which focuses on the child's behavior, emphasizes controlling children using rewards and punishments, and views parental love as a privilege to be earned. The concept of unconditional parenting was popularized by author Alfie Kohn in his 2005 book Unconditional Parenting: Moving from Rewards and Punishments to Love and Reason. Kohn differentiates unconditional parenting from what he sees as the caricature of permissive parenting by arguing that parents can be anti-authoritarian and opposed to exerting control while also recognizing the value of respectful adult guidance and a child's need for non-coercive structure in their lives.

=== Trustful parenting ===
Trustful parenting is a child-centered parenting style in which parents trust their children to make decisions, play and explore on their own, and learn from their own mistakes. Research professor Peter Gray argues that trustful parenting was the dominant parenting style in prehistoric hunter-gatherer societies. Gray contrasts trustful parenting with "directive-domineering" parenting, which emphasizes controlling children to train them in obedience (historically involving using child labor to teach subservience to lords and masters), and "directive-protective" parenting, which involves controlling children to protect them from harm. Gray argues that the directive-domineering approach became the predominant parenting style with the spread of agriculture and industry, while the directive-protective approach took over as the dominant approach in the late 20th century.

=== Material parenting ===
Material parenting is a parenting style of parents expressing their love or shaping their child's behavior through materialistic items. An example of materialistic parenting is giving a gift to a child as a reward or taking away a child's possession as punishment. There are two ways of material parenting: through parental warmth and through parental insecurity. A parent can use material rewards either conditionally or unconditionally. Recent research suggests concerns about a child's overconsumption of materialistic things which may lead to reduced self-esteem, martial problems, and financial hardships in adulthood.

== Practices ==
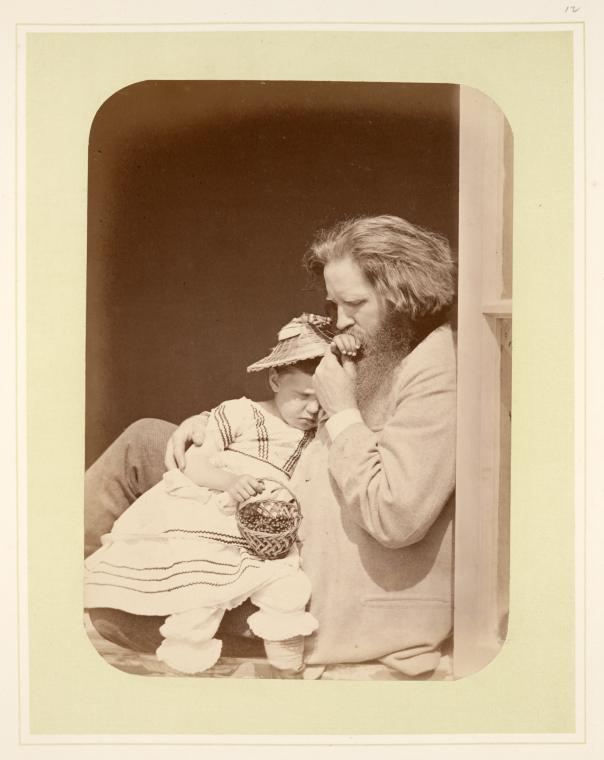
A father and child

A parenting practice is a specific behavior that a parent uses in raising a child. These practices are used to socialize children. Kuppens et al. found that "researchers have identified overarching parenting dimensions that reflect similar parenting practices, mostly by modeling the relationships among these parenting practices using factor analytic techniques." For example, many parents read aloud to their offspring in the hopes of supporting their linguistic and intellectual development. In cultures with strong oral traditions, such as Indigenous American communities and New Zealand Maori communities, storytelling is a critical parenting practice for children.

Parenting practices reflect the cultural understanding of children. Parents in individualistic countries like Germany spend more time engaged in face-to-face interaction with babies and more time talking to the baby about the baby. Parents in more communal cultures, such as West African cultures, spend more time talking to the baby about other people and more time with the baby facing outwards so that the baby sees what the mother sees.

=== Skills and behaviors ===
Parenting skills and behaviors assist parents in leading children into healthy adulthood and development of the child's social skills. The cognitive potential, social skills, and behavioral functioning a child acquires during the early years are positively correlated with the quality of their interactions with their parents.

According to the Canadian Council on Learning, children benefit (or avoid poor developmental outcomes) when their parents:

1. Communicate truthfully about events: Authenticity from parents who explain can help their children understand what happened and how they are involved;
2. Maintain consistency: Parents that regularly institute routines can see benefits in their children's behavioral patterns;
3. Utilize resources available to them, reaching out into the community and building a supportive social network;
4. Take an interest in their child's educational and early developmental needs (e.g., Play that enhances socialization, autonomy, cohesion, calmness, and trust.); and
5. Keep open communication lines about what their child is seeing, learning, and doing, and how those things are affecting them.

Parenting skills are widely thought to be naturally present in parents; however, there is substantial evidence to the contrary. Those who come from a negative or vulnerable childhood environment frequently (and often unintentionally) mimic their parents' behavior during interactions with their own children. Parents with an inadequate understanding of developmental milestones may also demonstrate problematic parenting. Parenting practices are of particular importance during marital transitions like separation, divorce, and remarriage; if children fail to adequately adjust to these changes, they are at risk of negative outcomes (e.g. increased rule-breaking behavior, problems with peer relationships, and increased emotional difficulties).

Research classifies competence and skills required in parenting as follows:

- Parent-child relationship skills: quality time spent, positive communications, and delighted show of affection.
- Encouraging desirable behavior: praise and encouragement, nonverbal attention, facilitating engaging activities.
- Teaching skills and behaviors: being a good example, incidental teaching, human communication of the skill with role-playing and other methods, communicating logical incentives and consequences.
- Managing misbehavior: establishing firm ground rules and limits, directing discussion, providing clear and calm instructions, communicating and enforcing appropriate consequences, using restrictive tactics like quiet time and time out with an authoritative stance rather than an authoritarian one.
- Anticipating and planning: advanced planning and preparation for readying the child for challenges, finding out engaging and age-appropriate developmental activities, preparing the token economy for self-management practice with guidance, holding follow-up discussions, identifying possible negative developmental trajectories.
- Self-regulation skills: monitoring behaviors (own and children's), setting developmentally appropriate goals, evaluating strengths and weaknesses and setting practice tasks, monitoring and preventing internalizing and externalizing behaviors.
- Mood and coping skills: reframing and discouraging unhelpful thoughts (diversions, goal orientation, and mindfulness), stress and tension management (own and children's), developing personal coping statements and plans for high-risk situations, building mutual respect and consideration between members of the family through collaborative activities and rituals.
- Partner support skills: improving personal communication, giving and receiving constructive feedback and support, avoiding negative family interaction styles, supporting and finding hope in problems for adaptation, leading collaborative problem solving, promoting relationship happiness and cordiality.

Consistency is considered the "backbone" of positive parenting skills and "overprotection" the weakness.

The Arbinger Institute adds to these skills and methods of parenting with what the authors of The Parenting Pyramid claims are methods to "parent for things to go right," or in other words steps that should be taken to ensure good positive relationships are occurring in the home which can help children be more willing to listen. Their methods are described as The Parenting Pyramid. The Parenting Pyramid starting at the foundational level and working up to the top:

1. Ways of being
2. Relationship with spouse
3. Relationship with child
4. Teaching
5. and finally, Corrections

Believing that as parents are focused on this order of establishing their homes and parenting styles, then if a parent has to encourage different behaviors from children this correction will come from a better place and therefore the children may be more receptive to such feedback, compared to if a parent attempts to correct behaviors before focusing on the previous steps.

=== Parent training ===
Parent psychosocial health can have a significant impact on the parent-child relationship. Group-based parent training and education programs have proven to be effective at improving short-term psychosocial well-being for parents. There are many different types of training parents can take to support their parenting skills. Some groups include Parent-Child Interaction Therapy (PCIT), Parents Management Training (PMT), Positive Parenting Program (Triple P), The Incredible Years, and Behavioral and Emotional Skills Training (BEST). PCIT works with both parents and children in teaching skills to interact more positively and productive. PMT is focused for children aged 3–13, in which parents are the main trainee. They are taught skills to help deal with challenging behaviors from their children. Triple P focus on equipping parents with the information they need to increase confidence and self-sufficiency in managing their children's behavior. The Incredible Years focuses in age infancy-age 12, in which they are broken into small-group-based training in different areas. BEST introduces effective behavior management techniques in one day rather than over the course of a few weeks. Courses are offered to families based on effective training to support additional needs, behavioral guidelines, communication and many others to give guidance throughout learning how to be a parent.

In research on parenting, Jay Belsky's process of parenting model is widely used to assess how a parent's well-being such as their work and social life impacts parenting in early childhood. Belsky's model has been used to show how children, parents, and extended families can thrive. The model has been associated with how social support can affect parenting. Research has also found how the parents' cognitions can affect how a child is raised and how supportive a parent can be. If a parents' cognitions are more positive, then a child can be raised more supportively which can lead the child to have positive self-perceptions.

=== Cultural values ===
Parents around the world want what they believe is best for their children. However, parents in different cultures have different ideas of what is best. For example, parents in hunter–gatherer societies or those who survive through subsistence agriculture are likely to promote practical survival skills from a young age. Many such cultures begin teaching children to use sharp tools, including knives, before their first birthdays. In some Indigenous American communities, child work provides children the opportunity to absorb cultural values of collaborative participation and prosocial behavior through observation and activity alongside adults. These communities value respect, participation, and non-interference, the Cherokee principle of respecting autonomy by withholding unsolicited advice. Indigenous American parents also try to encourage curiosity in their children via a permissive parenting style that enables them to explore and learn through observation of the world.

Differences in cultural values cause parents to interpret the same behaviors in different ways. For instance, European Americans prize intellectual understanding, especially in a narrow "book learning" sense, and believe that asking questions is a sign of intelligence. Italian parents value social and emotional competence and believe that curiosity demonstrates good interpersonal skills. Dutch parents, however, value independence, long attention spans, and predictability; in their eyes, asking questions is a negative behavior, signifying a lack of independence.

Even so, parents around the world share specific prosocial behavioral goals for their children. Hispanic parents value respect and emphasize putting family above the individual. Parents in East Asia prize order in the household above all else. In some cases, this gives rise to high levels of psychological control and even manipulation on the part of the head of the household. The Kipsigis people of Kenya value children who are innovative and wield that intelligence responsibly and helpfully—a behavior they call ng/om. Other cultures, such as in Sweden and Spain, value sociality and happiness as well.

==== Indigenous American cultures ====
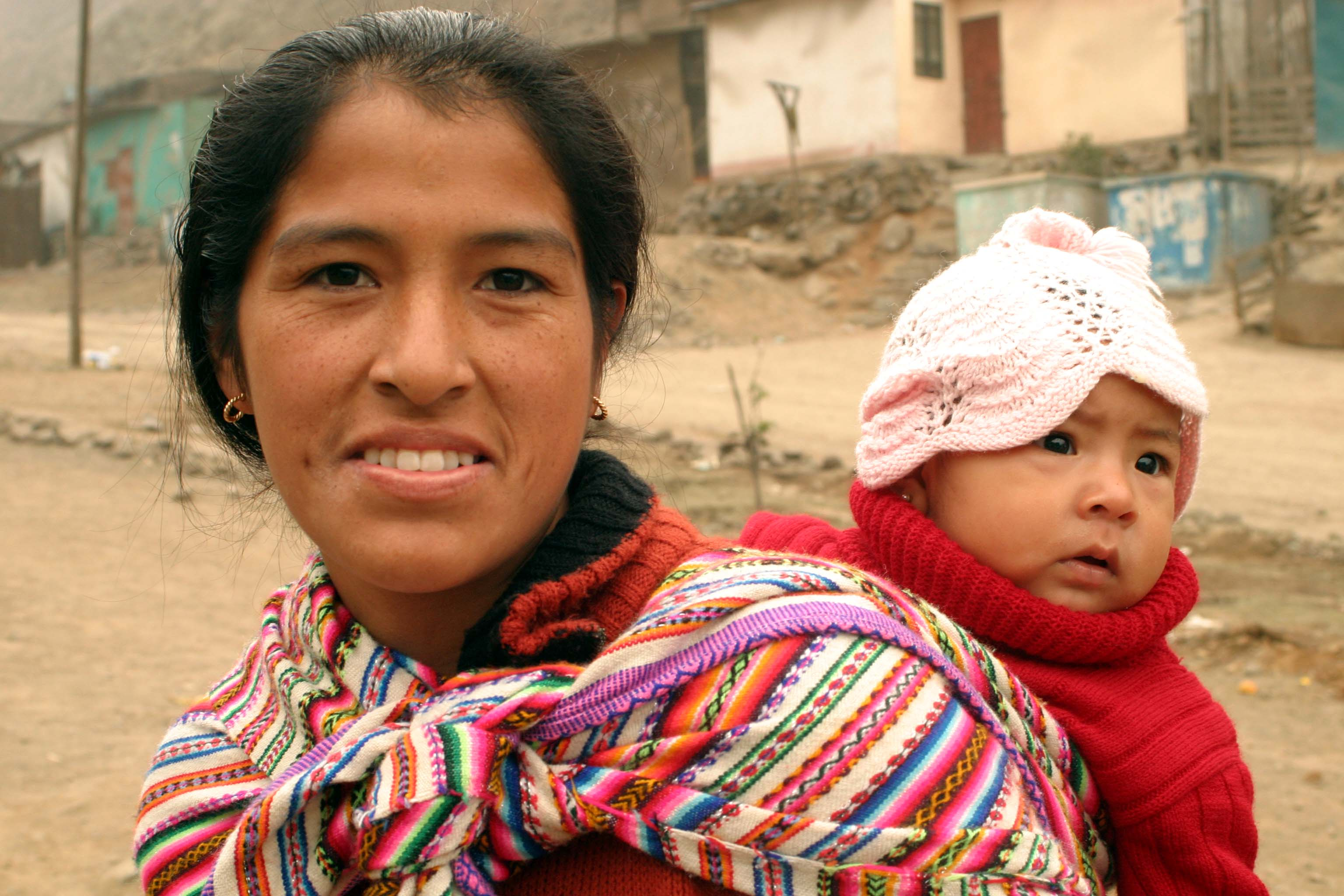
Baby on back in Lima, Peru

It is common for parents in many Indigenous American communities to use different parenting tools such as storytelling —like myths— Consejos (Spanish for "advice"), educational teasing, nonverbal communication, and observational learning to teach their children important values and life lessons.

Storytelling is a way for Indigenous American children to learn about their identity, community, and cultural history. Indigenous myths and folklore often personify animals and objects, reaffirming the belief that everything possesses a soul and deserves respect. These stories also help preserve the language and are used to reflect certain values or cultural histories.

The Consejo is a narrative form of advice-giving. Rather than directly telling the child what to do in a particular situation, the parent might instead tell a story about a similar situation. The main character in the story is intended to help the child see their decision's implications without directly deciding for them; this teaches the child to be decisive and independent while still providing some guidance.

The playful form of teasing is a parenting method used in some Indigenous American communities to keep children out of danger and guide their behavior. This parenting strategy uses stories, fabrications, or empty threats to guide children in making safe, intelligent decisions. For example, a parent may tell a child that there is a monster that jumps on children's backs if they walk alone at night. This explanation can help keep the child safe because instilling that fear creates greater awareness and lessens the likelihood that they will wander alone into trouble.

In Navajo families, a child's development is partly focused on the importance of "respect" for all things. "Respect" consists of recognizing the significance of one's relationship with other things and people in the world. Children largely learn about this concept via nonverbal communication between parents and other family members. For example, children are initiated at an early age into the practice of an early morning run under any weather conditions. On this run, the community uses humor and laughter with each other, without directly including the child—who may not wish to get up early and run—to encourage the child to participate and become an active member of the community. Parents also promote participation in the morning runs by placing their child in the snow and having them stay longer if they protest.

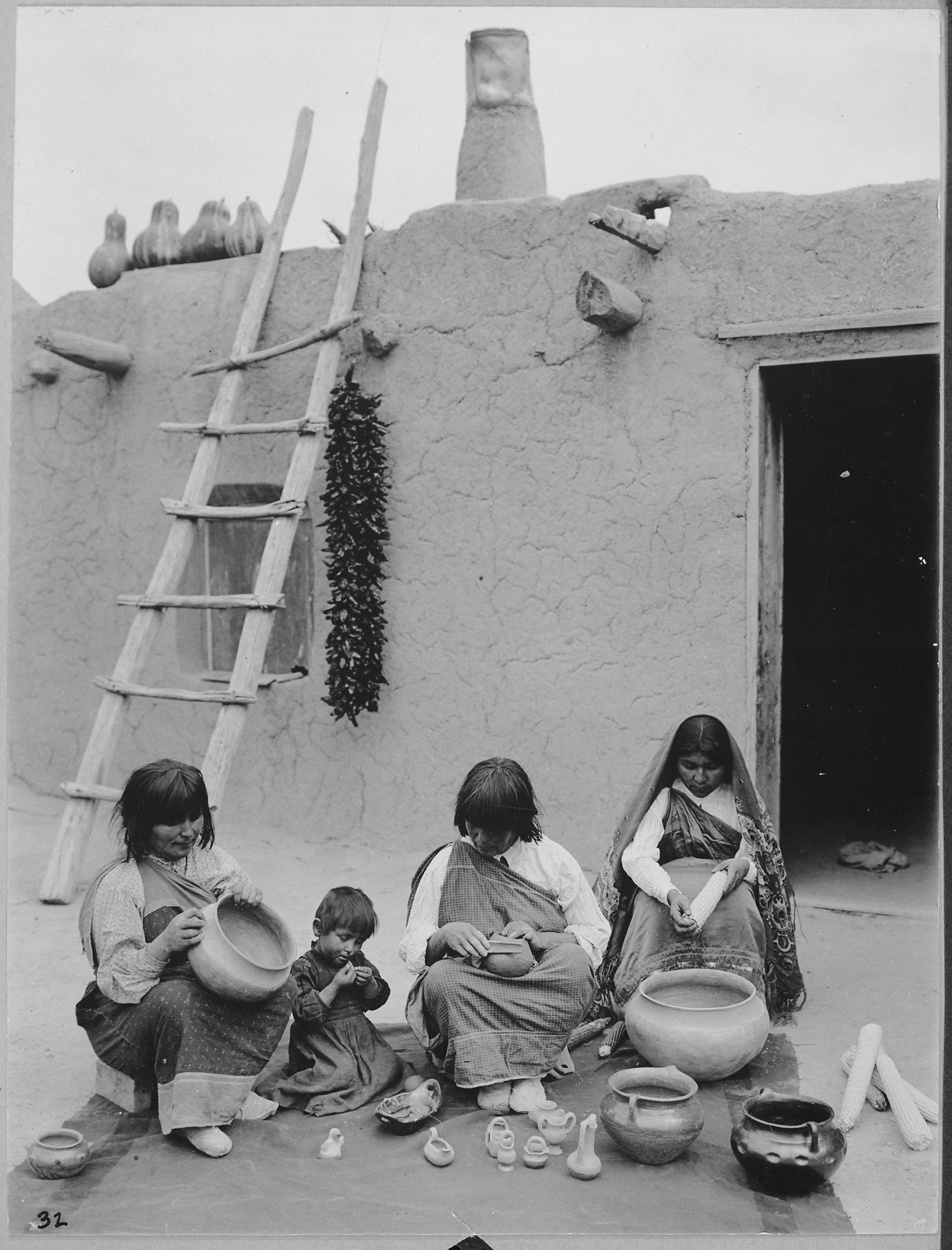
Indians of Santa Clara Pueblo, New Mexico, making pottery, 1916

Indigenous American parents often incorporate children into everyday life, including adult activities, allowing the child to learn through observation. This practice is known as LOPI, Learning by Observing and Pitching In, where children are integrated into all types of mature daily activities and encouraged to observe and contribute in the community. This inclusion as a parenting tool promotes both community participation and learning.

One notable example appears in some Mayan communities: young girls are not permitted around the hearth for an extended period of time, since corn is sacred. Although this is an exception to their cultural preference for incorporating children into activities, including cooking, it is a strong example of observational learning. Mayan girls can only watch their mothers making tortillas for a few minutes at a time, but the sacredness of the activity captures their interest. They will then go and practice their mother's movements on other objects, such as kneading thin pieces of plastic like a tortilla. From this practice, when a girl comes of age, she is able to sit down and make tortillas without having ever received any explicit verbal instruction.

However, in many cases oppressive circumstances such as forced conversion, land loss, and displacement led to diminishment of traditional Native American parenting techniques.

==== Immigrants in the United States: Ethnic-racial socialization ====
Due to the increasing racial and ethnic diversity in the United States, ethnic-racial socialization research has gained some attention. Parental ethnic-racial socialization is a way of passing down cultural resources to support children of color's psychosocial wellness. The goals of ethnic-racial socialization are: to pass on a positive view of one's ethnic group and to help children cope with racism. Through a meta-analysis of published research on ethnic-racial socialization, ethnic-racial socialization positively affects psychosocial well-being. This meta-analytic review focuses on research relevant to four indicators of psychosocial skills and how they are influenced by developmental stage, race and ethnicity, research designs, and the differences between parent and child self-reports. The dimensions of ethnic-racial socialization that are considered when looking for correlations with psychosocial skills are cultural socialization, preparation for bias, promotion of mistrust, and egalitarianism.

Ethnic-racial socialization dimensions are defined as follows: cultural socialization is the process of passing down cultural customs, preparation for bias ranges from positive or negative reactions to racism and discrimination, promotion of mistrust conditions synergy when dealing with other races, and egalitarianism puts similarities between races first. Psychosocial competencies are defined as follows: self-perceptions involve perceived beliefs of academic and social capabilities, interpersonal relationships deal with the quality of relationships, externalizing behaviors deal with observable troublesome behavior, and internalizing behavior deals with emotional intelligence regulation. The multiple ways these domains and competencies interact show small correlations between ethnic-racial socialization and psychosocial wellness, but this parenting practice needs further research.

This meta-analysis showed that developmental stages affect how children perceived ethnic-racial socialization. Cultural socialization practices appear to affect children similarly across developmental stages except for preparation for bias and promotion of mistrust which are encouraged for older-aged children. Existing research shows ethnic-racial socialization serves African Americans positively against discrimination. Cross-sectional studies were predicted to have greater effect sizes because correlations are inflated in these kinds of studies. Parental reports of ethnic-racial socialization influence are influenced by "intentions", so child reports tend to be more accurate.

Among other conclusions derived from this meta-analysis, cultural socialization and self-perceptions had a small positive correlation. Cultural socialization and promotion of mistrust had a small negative correlation, and interpersonal relationships positively impacted cultural socialization and preparation for bias. In regard to developmental stages, ethnic-racial socialization had a small but positive correlation with self-perceptions during childhood and early adolescence. Based on study designs, there were no significant differences, meaning that cross-sectional studies and longitudinal studies both showed small positive correlations between ethnic-racial socialization and self-perceptions. Reporter differences between parents and children showed positive correlations between ethnic-racial socialization when associated with internalizing behavior and interpersonal relationships. These two correlations showed a greater effect size with child reports compared to parent reports.

The meta-analysis on previous research shows only correlations, so there is a need for experimental studies that can show causation amongst the different domains and dimensions. Children's behavior and adaptation to this behavior may indicate a bidirectional effect that can also be addressed by an experimental study. There is evidence to show that ethnic-racial socialization can help children of color obtain social-emotional skills that can help them navigate through racism and discrimination, but further research needs to be done to increase the generalizability of existing research.

== Across the lifespan ==
=== Pre-pregnancy ===
Family planning is the decision-making process surrounding whether to become parents or not, and when the right time would be, including planning, preparing, and gathering resources. Prospective parents may assess (among other matters) whether they have access to sufficient financial resources, whether their family situation is stable, and whether they want to undertake the responsibility of raising a child. Worldwide, about 40% of all pregnancies are not planned, and more than 30 million babies are born each year as a result of unplanned pregnancies.

Reproductive health and preconception care affect pregnancy, reproductive success, and the physical and mental health of both mother and child. A woman who is underweight, whether due to poverty, eating disorders, or illness, is less likely to have a healthy pregnancy and give birth to a healthy baby than a woman who is healthy. Similarly, a woman who is obese has a higher risk of difficulties, including gestational diabetes. Other health problems, such as infections and iron-deficiency anemia, can be detected and corrected before conception.

=== Pregnancy and prenatal parenting ===
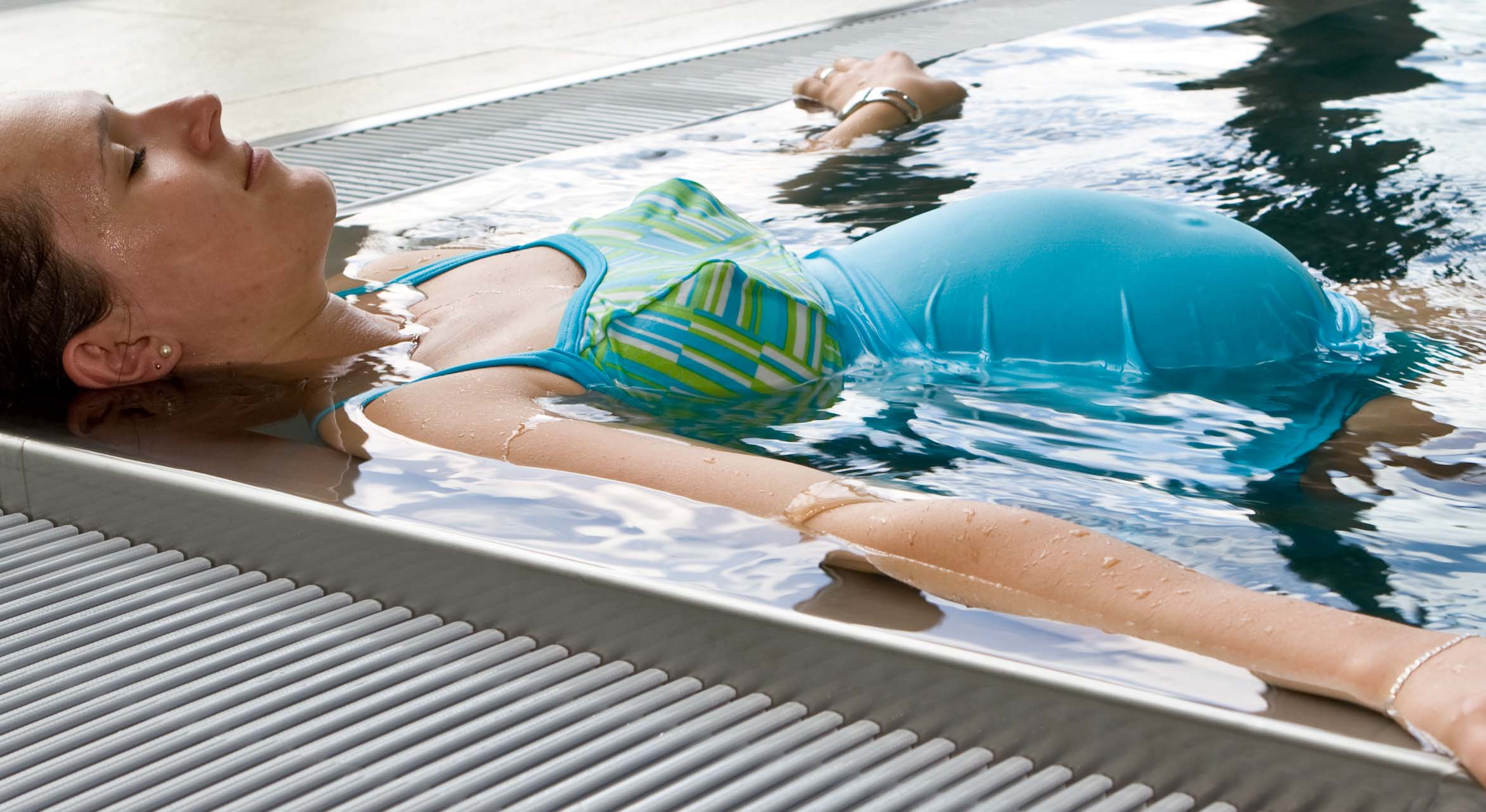
Pregnant women and their unborn children benefit from moderate exercise, sufficient sleep, and high-quality nutrition.

During pregnancy, the unborn child is affected by many decisions made by the parents, particularly choices linked to their lifestyle. The health, activity level, and nutrition available to the mother can affect the child's development before birth. Some mothers, especially in relatively wealthy countries, overeat and spend too much time resting. Other mothers, especially if they are poor or abused, may be overworked and may not be able to eat enough, or may not be able to afford healthful foods with sufficient iron, vitamins, and protein, for the unborn child to develop properly.

=== Newborns and infants ===
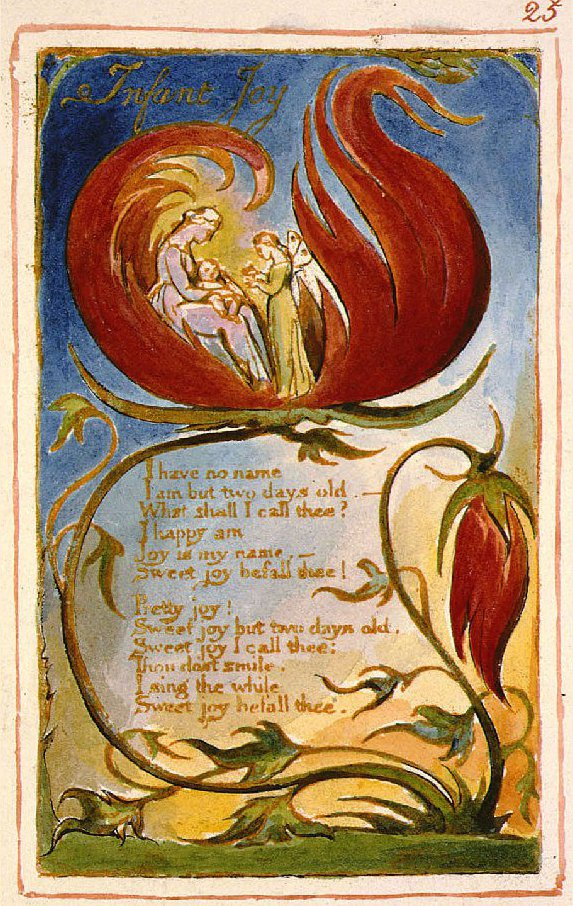
A mother wishes joy towards her child in William Blake's poem "Infant Joy". This copy, Copy AA, was printed and painted in 1826, is currently held by the Fitzwilliam Museum.

Newborn parenting is where the responsibilities of parenthood typically begin. A newborn's basic needs are food, sleep, comfort, and cleaning, which the parent provides. An infant's only form of communication is crying, while there is some argument that infants have different types of cries for being hungry or in pain, that has largely been refuted. Newborns and young infants require feedings every few hours, which is disruptive to adult sleep cycles. They respond enthusiastically to soft stroking, cuddling, and caressing. Gentle rocking back and forth often calms a crying infant, as do massages and warm baths. Newborns may comfort themselves by sucking their thumb or by using a pacifier. The need to suckle is instinctive and allows newborns to feed. Breastfeeding is the recommended method of feeding by all major infant health organizations. If breastfeeding is not possible or desired, bottle feeding is a common alternative. Other alternatives include feeding breastmilk or formula with a cup, spoon, feeding syringe, or nursing supplement.

The forming of attachments is considered the foundation of the infant's capacity to form and conduct relationships throughout life. Attachment is not the same as love or affection, although they often go together. Attachments develop immediately, and a lack of attachment or a seriously disrupted attachment has the potential to cause severe damage to a child's health and well-being. Physically, one may not see symptoms or indications of a disorder, but the child may be affected emotionally. Studies show that children with secure attachments have the ability to form successful relationships, express themselves on an interpersonal basis, and have higher self-esteem. Conversely children who have neglectful or emotionally unavailable caregivers can exhibit behavioral problems such as post-traumatic stress disorder or oppositional defiant disorder. Oppositional-defiant disorder is a pattern of disobedient and rebellious behavior toward authority figures.

=== Toddlers ===
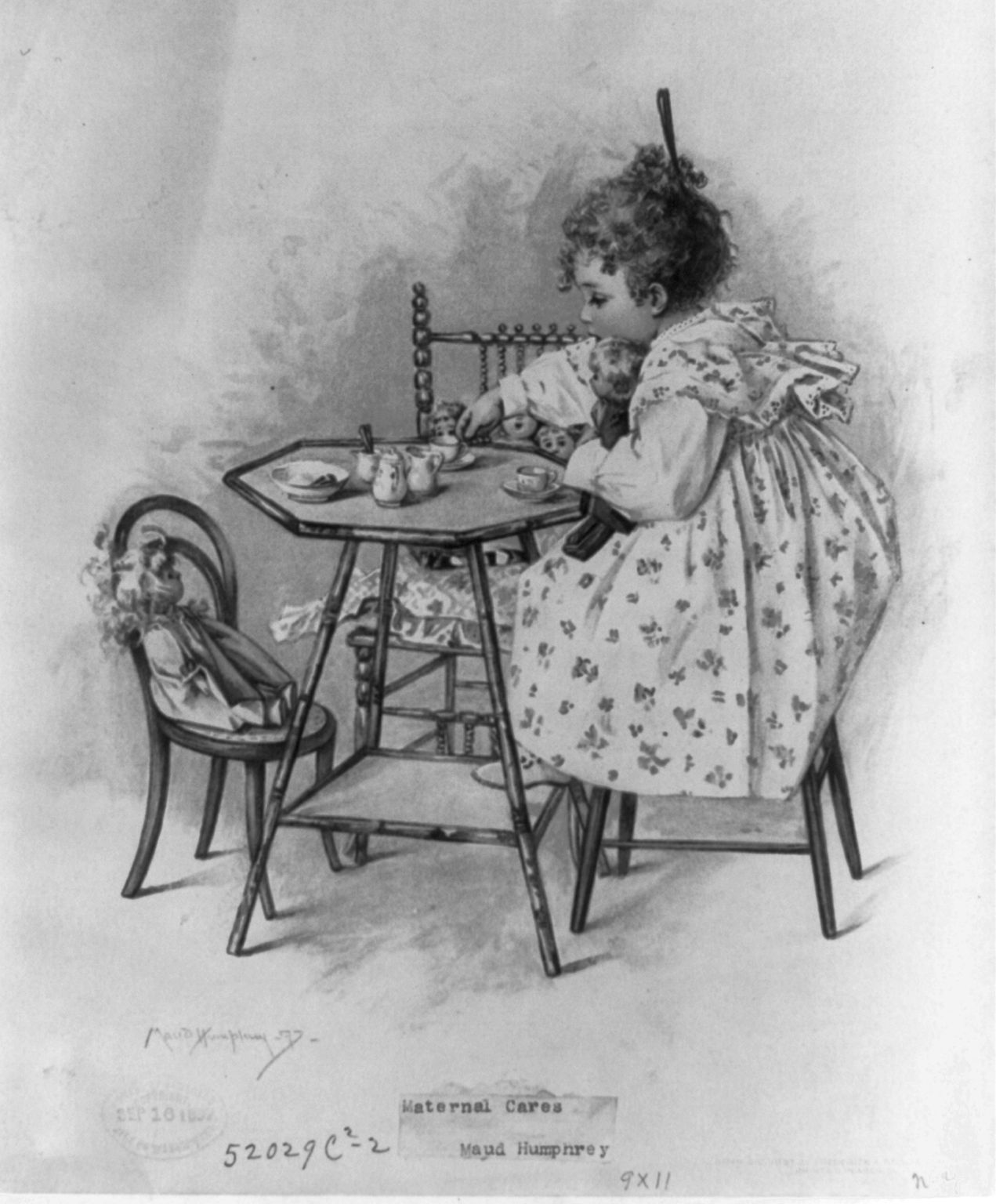
A painting by Maud Humphrey of a child at a small table with dolls and toy china

Toddlers are small children between 12 and 36 months old who are much more active than infants and become challenged with learning how to do simple tasks by themselves. At this stage, parents are heavily involved in showing the small child how to do things rather than just doing things for them; it is normal for the toddler to mimic the parents. Toddlers need help to build their vocabulary, increase their communication skills, and manage their emotions. Toddlers will also begin to understand social etiquette, such as being polite and taking turns.

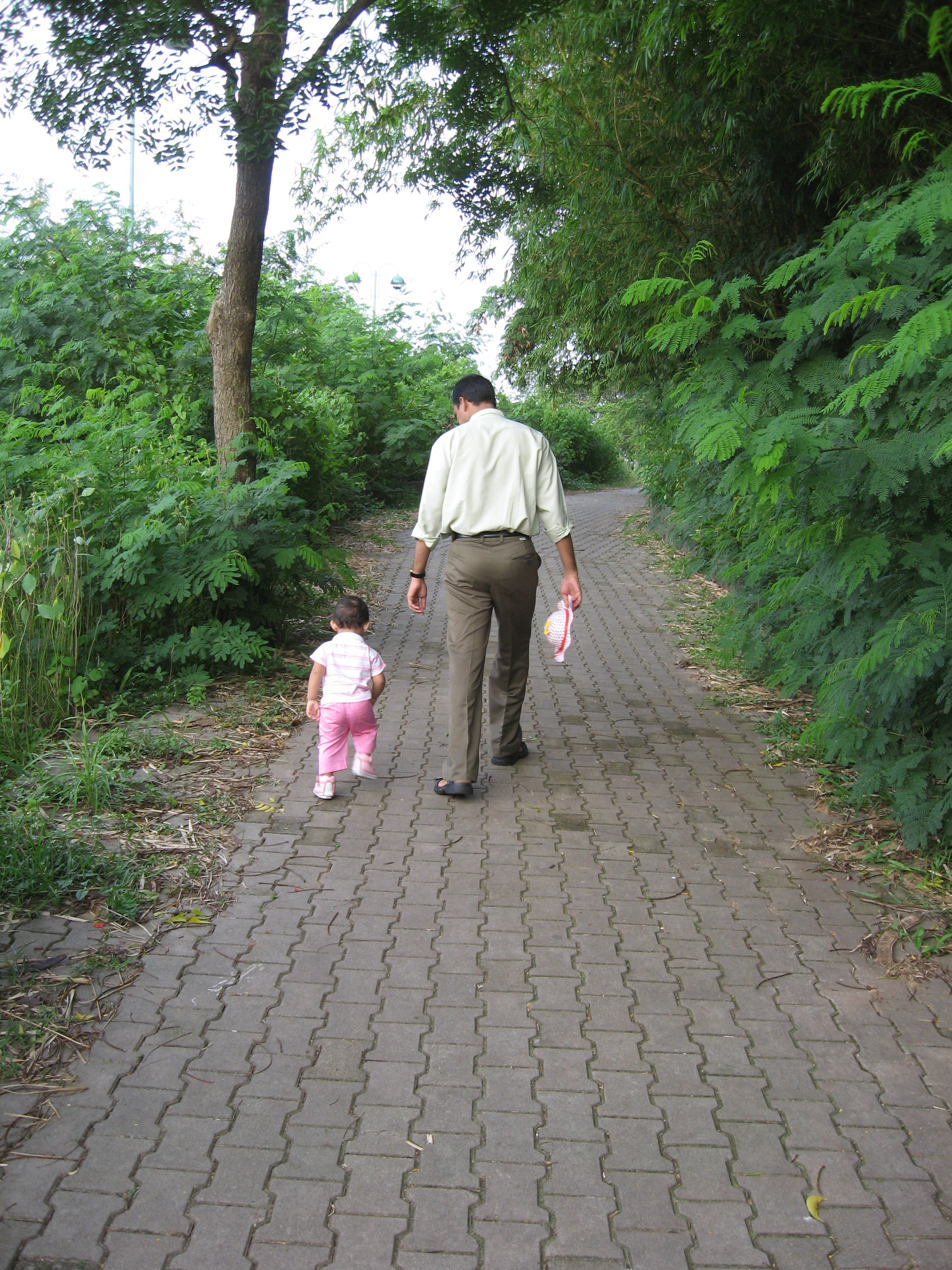
A father and daughter in Trivandrum, India

Toddlers are very curious about the world around them and are eager to explore it. They seek greater independence and responsibility and may become frustrated when things do not go the way that they want or expect. Tantrums begin at this stage, which is sometimes referred to as the 'Terrible Twos'. Tantrums are often caused by the child's frustration over the particular situation, and are sometimes caused, simply because they are not able to communicate properly. Parents of toddlers are expected to help guide and teach the child, establish basic routines (such as washing hands before meals or brushing teeth before bed), and increase the child's responsibilities. It is also normal for toddlers to be frequently frustrated. It is an essential step to their development. They will learn through experience, trial, and error. This means that they need to experience being frustrated when something does not work for them in order to move on to the next stage. When the toddler is frustrated, they will often misbehave with actions like screaming, hitting or biting. Parents need to be careful when reacting to such behaviors; giving threats or punishments is usually not helpful and might only make the situation worse. Research groups led by Daniel Schechter, Alytia Levendosky, and others have shown that parents with histories of maltreatment and violence exposure often have difficulty helping their toddlers and preschool-age children with the very same emotionally dysregulated behaviors which can remind traumatized parents of their adverse experiences and associated mental states.

Regarding gender differences in parenting, data from the US in 2014 states that, on an average day, among adults living in households with children under age 6, women spent one hour providing physical care (such as bathing or feeding a child) to household children. By contrast, men spent 23 minutes providing physical care.

=== Child ===
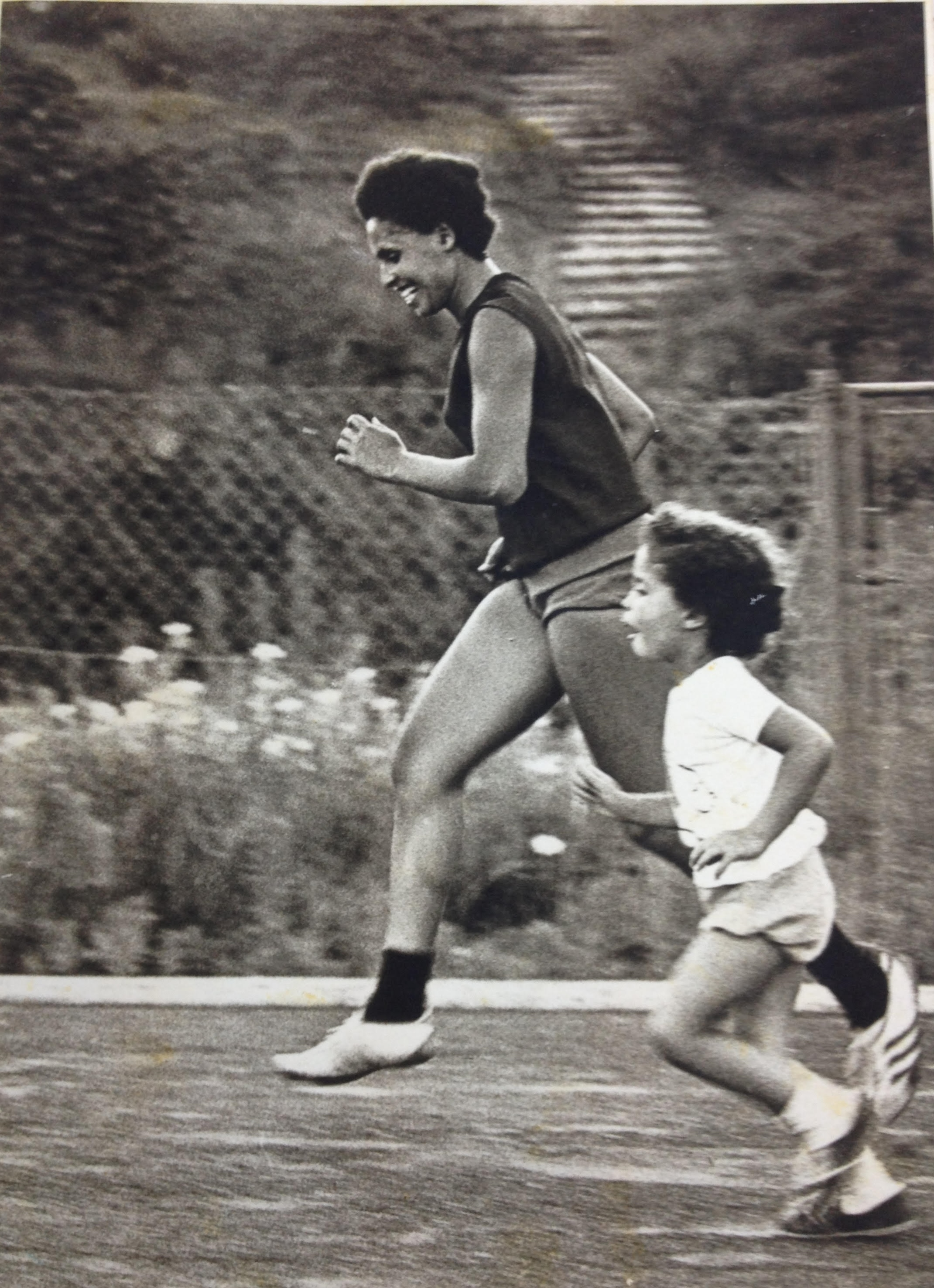
Sprinter Miriam Siderenski running alongside her daughter

Younger children start to become more independent and begin to build friendships. They are able to reason and can make their own decisions in many hypothetical situations. Young children demand constant attention but gradually learn how to deal with boredom and begin to be able to play independently. They enjoy helping and also feeling useful and capable. Parents can assist their children by encouraging social interactions and modeling proper social behaviors. A large part of learning in the early years comes from being involved in activities and household duties. Parents who observe their children in play or join with them in child-driven play have the opportunity to glimpse into their children's world, learn to communicate more effectively with their children, and are given another setting to offer gentle, nurturing guidance. Parents also teach their children health, hygiene, and eating habits through instruction and by example.

Parents are expected to make decisions about their child's education. Parenting styles in this area diverge greatly at this stage, with some parents they choose to become heavily involved in arranging organized activities and early learning programs. Other parents choose to let the child develop with few organized activities.

Children begin to learn responsibility and consequences for their actions with parental assistance. Some parents provide a small allowance that increases with age to help teach children the value of money and how to be responsible.

Parents who are consistent and fair with their discipline, who openly communicate and offer explanations to their children, and who do not neglect the needs of their children in any way often find they have fewer problems with their children as they mature.

When child conduct problems are encountered, behavioral and cognitive-behavioral group-based parenting interventions have been found to be effective at improving child conduct, parenting skills, and parental mental health.

=== Adolescents ===
Parents often feel isolated and alone when parenting adolescents. Adolescence can be a time of high risk for children, where newfound freedoms can result in decisions that drastically open up or close off life opportunities. There are also large changes that occur in the brain during adolescence; the emotional center of the brain is now fully developed, but the rational frontal cortex has not matured fully and still is not able to keep all of those emotions in check. Adolescents tend to increase the amount of time spent with peers of the opposite gender; however, they still maintain the amount of time spent with those of the same gender—and do this by decreasing the amount of time spent with their parents.

Although adolescents look to peers and adults outside the family for guidance and models for how to behave, parents can remain influential in their development. Studies have shown that parents can have a significant impact, for instance, on how much teens drink. Other studies show that parents' continued presence provides stability and nurture to their developing adolescents.

During adolescence children begin to form their identity and start to test and develop the interpersonal and occupational roles that they will assume as adults. Therefore, it is important that parents treat them as young adults. Parental issues at this stage of parenting include dealing with rebelliousness related to a greater desire to partake in risky behaviors. In order to prevent risky behaviors, it is important for the parents to build a trusting relationship with their children. This can be achieved through behavioral control, parental monitoring, consistent discipline, parental warmth and support, inductive reasoning, and strong parent-child communication.

When a trusting relationship is built up, adolescents are more likely to approach their parents for help when faced with negative peer pressure. Helping children build a strong foundation will ultimately help them resist negative peer pressure. Not only will a positive relationship between adolescent and parent benefit when faced with peer pressure, it will help with identity-processing in early adolescents. Research by Berzonsky et al. found that adolescents that were open and trusting of their parents were given more freedom and their parents were less likely to track them and control their behavior.

=== Adults ===
Parenting does not usually end when a child turns 18. Support may be needed in a child's life well beyond the adolescent years and can continue into middle and later adulthood. Parenting can be a lifelong process. Parents may provide financial support to their adult children, which can also include providing an inheritance after death. The life perspective and wisdom given by a parent can benefit their adult children in their own lives. Becoming a grandparent is another milestone and has many similarities with parenting. Roles can be reversed in some ways when adult children become caregivers to their elderly parents.

== Rights and responsibilities ==
Parental responsibilities or obligations include the provision of a home, food and security for children. Educating children also features within a parent's responsibilities, along with maintaining a healthy family atmosphere within the home.

Parents may receive assistance with caring for their children. Article 25.2 of the Universal Declaration of Human Rights declares that:

Motherhood and childhood are entitled to special care and assistance. All children, whether born in or out of wedlock, shall enjoy the same social protection.

— Universal Declaration of Human Rights, Article 25.2

== Effects of parenting ==
Data from the British Household Panel Survey and the German Socio-Economic Panel suggests that having up to two children increases happiness in the years around the birth, and mostly only for those who have postponed childbearing. However, having a third child is not shown to increase happiness. Data from a private opinion American survey, called Success Index, suggests that parenting is deemed important for people, especially for those aged 65 and older as compared to those aged 18 to 35. According to the survey, being a parent is now an integral part of the new American Dream.

Increased number of children increases the sustainability of Pay-as-you-go pension systems. Some pension systems can offer parents lower pension contributions that to voluntary childlessness individuals for same pension benefits.

== See also ==
- Child care
- Child custody
- Childlessness
- Developmental psychology
- Empty nest syndrome
- Family law
- Same-sex parenting
- Motherhood constellation
- Outline of children
- Parent Rescue (documentary series)
- Parental alienation
- Parenting plan
- Parental controls
- Parental supervision
- Parenting coordinator
- Paternal age effect
- Paternal care
- Pedagogy
- Shared parenting
- Sharenting
