= Noncustodial parent =

Parent who only has visitation with child following divorce

A noncustodial parent is a parent who does not have physical custody of his or her minor child as the result of a court order. When the child lives with only one parent, in a sole custody arrangement, then the parent with which the child lives is the custodial parent while the other parent is the non-custodial parent. The non-custodial parent may have contact or visitation rights. In a shared parenting arrangement, where the child lives an equal or approximately equal amount of time with the mother and father, both are custodial parents and neither is a non-custodial parent.

A "child-custody determination" is a judgment, decree, or other order of a court providing for the legal custody, physical custody, or visitation with respect to a child. A custody determination can be made through a permanent or temporary order, or as part of an initial custody determination or later modification of a prior custody order. A custody determination may be made at the same time as an order for child support or a similar financial obligation for a parent, but is separate from a child support order.

== Child custody and visitation ==
There are two kinds of child custody: legal custody and physical custody. Physical custody, designates where the child will live, whereas legal custody gives the custodial person(s) the right to make decisions for the child's welfare. Often one parent will retain physical custody, while sharing joint legal custody with the other parent. The noncustodial parent is typically required to pay child support, and visitation is arranged.

Where the child will live with both parents, joint physical custody is ordered, and both parents are custodial parents. In the case of joint physical custody a 50/50 equal shared parenting schedule is typically not required, therefore the joint custodial parent may have the minority of time with the child but not be said to be a non-custodial parent. For example, states such as Alabama, California, and Texas do not necessarily require joint custody orders to result in substantially equal parenting time, whereas states such as Arizona, Georgia, and Louisiana do require joint custody orders to result in substantially equal parenting time where feasible.

== United States ==
=== Family Educational Rights and Privacy Act (FERPA) ===
Within the United States, family law differs from state to state, and noncustodial parents are a diverse population, with many factors affecting custody arrangements, from which parent is awarded custody to negotiating visitation schedules. A noncustodial may have difficulty in accessing medical records, educational status and other information regarding their child, but there is some federal legislation which supports the rights of a noncustodial parent who retains legal custody of their child.

Student education records are official and confidential documents protected within the United States by strong privacy protection laws, most notably the Family Educational Rights and Privacy Act (FERPA). FERPA, also known as the Buckley Amendment, defines education records as all records that schools or education agencies maintain about students. FERPA gives parents the right to review and confirm the accuracy of education records and applies to public schools and state or local education agencies that receive Federal education funds, both paper and computerized records. In addition to the Federal laws that restrict disclosure of information from student records, most states also have privacy protection laws that reinforce FERPA. State laws can supplement FERPA, but compliance with FERPA is necessary if schools are to continue to be eligible to receive Federal education funds.

FERPA gives both parents, custodial and noncustodial, equal access to student information unless the school has evidence of a court order or state law revoking these rights. When students reach the age of 18, or when they become students at postsecondary education institutions, they become "eligible students" and rights under FERPA transfer to them. However, parents retain access to student records of children who are their dependents for tax purposes.

In the case of divorce or separation, a school district must provide access to both natural parents, custodial and non-custodial, unless there is a legally binding document that specifically removes that parent's FERPA rights. Custody or other residential arrangements for a child do not, by themselves, affect the FERPA rights of the child's parents. One can best understand the FERPA position on parents' rights by separating the concept of custody from the concept of rights that FERPA gives parents. Custody, as a legal concept, establishes where a child will live, and often, the duties of the person(s) with whom the child lives. The FERPA, on the other hand, simply establishes the parents' right of access to and control of education record related to the child.

Generally, a school is not required to provide parents copies of records. However, if the distance is great enough to make it impractical for the parent to visit the school to review the record, the school must make copies of the record and send them to the parent when that parent requests access to the record.

== See also ==
- Child custody
- Child support
- Contact (law)
- Deadbeat parent
- Joint custody
- Parent
- Parental alienation
- Parenting coordinator
- Parenting plan
- Shared parenting
- Sole custody
- Supervised visitation

USA specific:

- Elk Grove Unified School District v. Newdow
- Fathers' rights movement in the USA
- Bradley Amendment
- Child custody laws in the United States
- Uniform Child Custody Jurisdiction And Enforcement Act
