= Compassionate reprieve =

Global grief-related support and funeral access policies for incarcerated individuals

Compassionate reprieve refers to a range of correctional practices and policies intended to support incarcerated individuals experiencing grief, loss, or family crisis. These include compassionate release, temporary escorted leave for funerals or hospital visits, and increasingly, access to virtual funeral attendance via secure video streaming. The aim is to preserve human dignity and maintain family bonds within the confines of incarceration.

Many prison systems—including those in the United States, United Kingdom, Canada, Australia, and South Africa—provide mechanisms for temporary or early release based on humanitarian grounds. These are typically considered in cases involving terminal illness, death of a close relative, or serious medical emergencies affecting the inmate's immediate family. In addition, video-based funeral streaming has emerged as a practice to offer connection when in-person attendance is not feasible.

While these practices vary by jurisdiction, the underlying approach reflects a growing international recognition of grief and bereavement as relevant to rehabilitation and humane treatment in correctional settings.

== Compassionate release policies ==
Many countries permit the early release of incarcerated individuals for medical or humanitarian reasons. These policies—commonly known as compassionate release or medical parole—are most often invoked in cases of terminal illness, advanced age, or critical family emergencies.

In the United States, the federal prison system allows inmates to request compassionate release for "extraordinary and compelling" reasons, such as terminal medical conditions. The First Step Act of 2018 expanded access by allowing incarcerated individuals to directly petition courts for early release if the Bureau of Prisons does not act on their request.

In the United Kingdom, the Secretary of State may authorize early release if "exceptional circumstances" justify it. Most cases involve terminal illness or the severe incapacitation of the prisoner.

Canada allows "parole by exception" under similar criteria. While available on paper, advocates note it has rarely been granted in practice.

In South Africa, compassionate release is possible through its medical parole system, revised in 2012 to include cases of severe incapacitation in addition to terminal illness. A medical board reviews each application.

== Virtual funeral access ==
When in-person funeral attendance is not possible due to security, cost, or logistical constraints, some correctional systems have introduced virtual attendance options. These allow incarcerated individuals to view live-streamed funeral services from within the facility under supervision.

In the United States, the Michigan Department of Corrections began a statewide policy in 2021 permitting inmates to view livestreams of funerals from designated rooms.

Similarly, in Texas, Harris County Jail used Zoom to facilitate virtual funeral attendance during the COVID-19 pandemic.

A Georgia nonprofit organization, Compassionate Reprieve, provides livestreaming services for inmates in the United States.

Internationally, during the COVID-19 pandemic, several prison systems adopted similar measures. In Australia, video attendance was used when in-person access was restricted. In Canada, video visitation and grief counseling alternatives have been explored to support inmate mental health and family connections.

== See also ==
- Compassionate release
- Prison reform
- Prisoner rights
- Virtual visitation
