= Contact (law) =

Child visitation

In family law, contact, visitation and access are synonym terms that denotes the time that a child spends with the noncustodial parent, according to an agreed or court specified parenting schedule. The visitation term is not used in a shared parenting arrangement where both parents have joint physical custody.

Unsupervised visitation is the most common type, when the parent may take the child to their home or enjoy any outing with the child. In supervised visitation, another adult must be present, and there is sometimes a court order to occur at a predetermined supervised child contact centre. Virtual visitation uses video-conferencing technology to allow contact when a child lives far away from the parent.

== Concept ==
In most jurisdictions the nature of a couple's relationship is established when a child is born to that relationship. In law, there may be differences in the consequences depending on whether the relationship is opposite-sex or same-sex, and whether it is in the form of a marriage, a civil union or registered partnership, or cohabitation without marriage. When one parent has sole custody of a child, there is usually court ordered contact/visitation with the non-custodial parent. The purpose is to ensure that the child can continue to maintain a relationship with both parents after divorce or separation, as well as in situations where the parents have never lived together. A common contact schedule is that the child spends every other weekend with the non-custodial parent, one weekday evening, certain holidays and a few weeks of summer vacation.

Children are subject to the authority of their parents during the early years of their life, during what is termed their minority. States impose a range of incapacities until the children reach an age when they are deemed sufficiently mature to take responsibility for their own actions. Issues of access and custody interact and overlap, and represent all of the aspects of care and control that parents may exercise in relation to their children. The extent to which the courts have jurisdiction to regulate access will depend on the nature of the parents' relationship. In the event of the breakdown of the relationship between a minor child's parents, a court may define or modify a parent's access rights to the child within the context of proceedings for legal separation, annulment, divorce or child custody. Custody and access rights may be established in other manners, such as adoption or legal guardianship. In some cases a court may appoint a guardian ad litem appointed to represent any child's interests within the context of custody litigation.

=== Residential parent ===
Residential parent is that parent with whom the children are staying in the majority of the time. This term started to be used since the implementation of the joint custody since both parents have the custody of the child but, usually the child lives in the house of one of them the majority of their time.

=== Non-residential parent ===
The non-residential parent is that parent that has been granted with the child custody but only accommodates the child in their house for limited periods of time.

== Supervised visitation ==
Under supervised visitation, another adult must be present during the contact hours. It is used to ensure the safety of the child while still allowing for a child-parent relationship. It may for example be used if there is a history of domestic violence, child abuse or child neglect, or if the parent has a substance abuse problem or a mental illness. Supervised visitation may have no location restrictions, or it may be ordered to occur at a specific child contact centre. Supervised visitation can be temporary in nature and changed to unsupervised visitation.

== Virtual visitation ==
With virtual visitation, the child communicates with the parent through video conferencing, video mail, email or instant messages. It can be ordered by a court and it is often used when the child lives far away from a parent. It may also be used if a parent is in prison. Virtual visitation is meant to complement rather than to replace standard physical contact time.

== Policy background ==
As a specific application of parens patriae (see public policy and the concept of best interests), most states treat the interests of any children caught up in litigation as their first and paramount concern. Usually, the children are not directly the parties to the lawsuit, so the courts have a range of options including the power to appoint a guardian ad litem to protect their interests. This is particularly important in cases involving the breakdown of any family relationship where questions relating to the welfare of the children will become significant in sometimes acrimonious disputes. At a supranational level, the Convention on the Rights of the Child emphasises the need to allow children a voice in any proceedings affecting their welfare. Significantly, it also suggests a change to the terminology, replacing "custody" and "access" with the concepts of "residence" and "contact".

However, the most common legal outcome to cases involving the issues of care and control reinforces the sexual stereotype that a mother is always the better qualified person to care for younger children. Whereas some jurisdictions formally prefer joint custody arrangements in situations where there has previously been a stable family relationship, many states have a formalised rebuttable presumption in favour of the mother.

== European Union law ==
The European Union has set up machinery for the mutual recognition of Family Law judgments through Council Regulation 2201/2003 which continues the harmonisation of the rules on jurisdiction and on the recognition and enforcement of all judgments on parental responsibility. The intention is to ensure that parental responsibility orders can be recognised and enforced through a uniform procedure. The courts in the Member State where the child is habitually resident have the primary jurisdiction to rule on parental responsibility. The courts in the other Member States shall enforce those judgments unless:

- this infringes public policy in the given Member State – an extremely unlikely eventuality;
- the child has not been given the opportunity to be heard except in cases of genuine urgency (in all cases, the fundamental right of every child to be heard and for their views to be given due weight in accordance with their age and maturity, is provided in Article 24 Charter of Fundamental Rights of the European Union which also states that the child's best interest shall be the primary consideration in all cases affecting their interests, whether initiated by public authorities or private institutions);
- the person claiming that the judgment infringes their rights of parental responsibility has not been given an opportunity to be heard, or was not allowed a reasonable time to prepare their defense (see natural justice); and
- the judgment is irreconcilable with a second subsisting judgment (under certain conditions).

Following a proposal from the Commission in May 2002, a regulation on parental responsibility which was adopted on 27 November 2003 and applies from 1 March 2005:

- ensures the right of the child to maintain contact with both parents even when the parents live in different Member States by allowing automatic recognition and enforcement of judgments on access rights, and
- seeks to prevent parental child abduction within the Community. The courts of the Member State of the child's residence before abduction always have the jurisdiction. Some parents have abducted children to their own states in the hope of receiving more favourable treatment. The courts of the abducting parent's nationality can only refuse to return the child immediately if this is necessary:

either because there is a grave risk that the child would be in danger if they returned, or
if the child has attained a certain age and maturity and does not want to return.

But the court in the state where the child resided before the abduction takes the final decision as to where the child shall stay, and such decisions must be respected in the state of current residence.

== England and Wales ==
Contact Orders are made under s8 Children Act 1989 to require the person(s) with whom a child lives to allow that child to visit, stay or have contact with a person named in the order. Orders continue until the child is 16 years. So long as the child is not under the care of a local authority, the following people can apply for a Contact Order:

1. the parent or guardian of a child (s10(4)(a));
2. anyone who holds a Residence Order in respect of that child (s10(4)(b));
3. a married stepparent of the child where the child lived with the stepparent as a child of the family (s10(5)(a));
4. anyone with whom the child has lived for at least three years (this period need not have been continuous but must have been recent) (s10(5)(b));
5. anyone who:

a) where there is already a Residence Order in place has the consent of every one who holds that order or
b) who has the consent of the local authority where the child is in their care or
c) has the consent of every one who has parental responsibility for the child.

If an applicant cannot apply for the order as of right they can make an application to the court seeking leave to issue the application. In deciding whether to grant the leave the court will consider under s10(9), amongst other things:

1. the nature of the application;
2. the applicant's connection with the child;
3. the risk there might be if the proposed application disrupting the child's life to such an extent that they should be harmed by it.

Under s11, the court must attempt to avoid delay in making an Order. The court will only make contact orders for children over sixteen years old in exceptional circumstances. Contact can either be direct e.g. face-to-face meetings with a person or indirect e.g. by letter, video, exchange of greeting cards etc. Some orders will be very specific as to times, dates and arrangements for contact, other orders will be more open with detailed arrangements to be made between the parties by agreement. These orders are not just obtained by parents for contact with their children, there can also be orders for contact between siblings or the child and wider family members. Sometimes the order will give directions that the contact is to be supervised by a third person. The order may also only be for a specific period or contain provisions which operate for a specific period. These are Orders of the court and a failure to comply can be a contempt of court with serious consequences.

Contact represents a change in fundamental concept to disputes involving the upbringing of children. Prior to the passage of the Children Act 1989 in the jurisdiction of England and Wales [and in Scotland in the Children (Scotland) Act 1995], an adult was usually granted 'access to' a child; now a child is to be allowed 'contact with an adult' [or stepbrother/sister]. Sixteen years after the Children Act 1989 became law, judges and the media in England still on occasion refer to 'custody and access' instead of 'residence and contact', and some judges are making orders such as 'father to have contact with the child' contrary to 'the child be allowed contact with father' as it argued by certain legal establishments the difference is minimal and in nomenclature only. The law is quiet clear that 'a residence order' undoubtedly gives additional rights to the residential parent, and does diminish the parental responsibility of the non-residential parent, in various ways. Therefore, custody and residence, or contact and access can be in some circumstances be interchangeable concepts in family law. The argument that 'winner no longer takes all' in contact/residence access/custody disputes does not hold water.

In October 2025, the UK Government announced its intention to pass legislation removing the legal presumption that children's best interests are served by them having contact with their parents.

== Japan ==
In Japan, there is no legal guarantee of access by a noncustodial parent. Despite this, courts do often grant access rights to a noncustodial parent in the event of a divorce, or to the father of a child born out of wedlock, who by law is declared noncustodial by default. However, these court ordered visits are often only for several hours once a month, and in some cases, only once a year. Further, courts will not enforce these access provisions when the custodial parent is not co-operative. Several groups are working to change related laws and provide more detailed information on these laws and alternatives.

== United States ==
Generally speaking, visitation is considered only a privilege granted to the non-custodial parent of any child of the family. The standard short-distance parenting plan by the family court in most U.S. states consists of alternating weekends and some holidays, there are also medium and long-distance parental plans that allow to combine these visits into a longer stretches of time to reduce traveling. Parents normally can make variations to the state standard parenting plan or develop a different custom plan if a judge approve the changes. In most of the states there is a law required that court-ordered parenting plans must set forth the minimum amount of parenting time and access a noncustodial parent is entitled to have.

However, the child, at or around the age of 13, depending on the state, may have a right to testify in court about custody and parenting plan arrangements that may have a big impact on court decision.

Parents (and in most States Grandparents) frequently believe that they have a right to visitation or access. However, when custodial parental interference with visitation occurs, civil courts in the U.S. do not enforce their own court orders. Usually citing, "best interests of the child" and reasoning punishment of the custodial parent to enforce the visitation order would further harm the child(ren) in question. Some States are looking at changing that by making visitation interference a criminal offence.

Most noncustodial parents have visitation orders that allow the child to visit with them without any supervision, away from the custodial residence. But sometimes when there are safety problems or child abuse history, the court can set up a supervised or "safety-focused" parenting plan. Also, a court can order the visitation to be supervised by a social worker, parenting coordinator, guardian ad litem, or other third party while the noncustodial parent visits with the child. This is called supervised visitation.

Parents may also agree to share custody and agree to allow visitation without going to court. In these situations, so it does not seem like a court order may not be needed, it should be obtained to forestall later disputes about what the parents had previously agreed to, and to allow the courts to have some oversight over the children (which they normally have under statute and under the parens patriae power). If the parenting plan agreed by parties before the court hearing, it is called "stipulated". Judges can approve the stipulated parenting plan without a court hearing. Judges are to normally encourage parties to reach the agreement, rather than go to hearing. By statistic, most family law cases (90–95%) settle before the judge rules on them.

In at least 27 states, a rapist who got their victim pregnant can legally sue for visitation, and in some cases even custody.

== See also ==
- Child custody
- Children's centre
- Shared parenting
- Supervised visitation
- Virtual Visitation
