= Parham v. J.R. =

- Supreme Court of the United States

Argued October 10, 1978 Decided June 20, 1979
- Full case name: Parham v. J.R.
- Citations: 442 U.S. 584 (more) 99 S. Ct. 2493; 61 L. Ed. 2d 101

Case history
- Prior: Judgment for plaintiffs, 412 F. Supp. 112 (M.D. Ga. 1976), probable jurisdiction noted, 431 U.S. 936 (1977).

Holding
- (1) Georgia's procedures for committing a child to a state mental hospital are not constitutionally deficient because the Constitution requires that parents are presumed to act in the best interest of their children. This presumption may only be rebutted, and the state may only intervene in a parental decision, if it is proven that a parent has neglected or abused their child. (2) The Due Process Clause requires that a "neutral factfinder" must periodically review a child's continued commitment to a state mental hospital upon parental request. However, the factfinder is not required to be trained in law, nor is the proceeding required to be an adversary hearing.

Court membership
- Chief Justice Warren E. Burger Associate Justices William J. Brennan Jr. · Potter Stewart; Byron White · Thurgood Marshall; Harry Blackmun · Lewis F. Powell Jr. William Rehnquist · John P. Stevens

Case opinions
- Majority: Burger, joined by White, Blackmun, Powell, Rehnquist
- Concurrence: Stewart
- Concur/dissent: Brennan, joined by Marshall, Stevens

Laws applied
- U.S. Const. amend. XIV

Parham v. J.R., 442 U.S. 584 (1979), was a United States Supreme Court case that reviewed Georgia's procedures for the commitment of a child to a mental hospital based on the request of a parent. The Court rejected, by a vote of 6–3, a class-action lawsuit from a group of minors, who claimed that the state's procedures were insufficient to ensure that parents did not use state mental hospitals as a "dumping ground" for children, and to ensure that minors committed to mental hospitals by their parents actually suffered from a condition sufficient to justify commitment. In so doing, the Court reversed a lower court ruling holding numerous aspects of the Georgia mental health system unconstitutional.

== Majority ==
The five-justice majority, composed of Chief Justice Burger and Justices White, Powell, Blackmun, and Rehnquist, concluded that the Due Process Clause of the Fourteenth Amendment did not afford minors committed to state mental hospitals by their parents the right to an adversarial hearing before a judicial or administrative authority. This is due to the presumption in United States constitutional law, built on the doctrine of parental rights, that parents act in the best interest of their child unless rebutted by a finding, based on compelling evidence, that they have abused their authority.

The majority rejected the "statist notion that governmental power should supersede parental authority ... because some parents abuse and neglect children." While the Court recognized that parents could abuse their power to commit a child to a mental hospital, these cases would be rare, and would be precluded by the procedures already in place. An adversarial hearing, Chief Justice Burger wrote, would create an unacceptable intrusion into the parent-child relationship, and would be inconsistent with the constitutional presumption of parental competence and good intentions.

Finally, the Court determined that because of the potential for abuse, the due process rights of minors required that state mental hospitals provide a neutral factfinder to review, after admission, parental decisions to involuntarily commit their minor child. However, the Court did not require pre-commitment hearings, and stated that the post-commitment procedures were not required to be adversarial or formal; the due process requirement could be fulfilled by a review of the parental decision by a neutral medical professional, considering all relevant information which that professional would rely on to make medical decisions.

As such, the District Court was reversed and remanded.

== Concurrence ==
Justice Stewart, concurring only in the judgment, accepted the majority's recognition of the presumption that parents act in their children's best interest, and stated that due to this presumption, Georgia's system did not violate the Constitution. However, he did not agree that the Constitution required states to respect parents' decisions in this area, citing Prince v. Massachusetts, where the Court held that parental rights may be restricted to serve a compelling government interest.

== Concurrence in part and dissent in part ==
Justice Brennan, joined by Justices Marshall and Stevens, agreed that due process did not require pre-commitment hearings for all juveniles committed by their parents. However, they argued that at least one post-admission hearing was required, where juveniles committed by their parents would possess the right to be "informed of the reasons for their commitment... the right to be present at the commitment determination, the right to representation, the right to be heard, the right to be confronted with adverse witnesses, the right to cross-examine, [and] the right to offer evidence of their own." Brennan, Marshall, and Stevens also stated that children in state custody were entitled to adversarial pre-commitment hearings, and that the consideration that parents act in the best interest of their children does not apply to social workers, who are themselves government agents. These three justices would have reversed the lower court decision in part and affirmed it in part.

== Impact ==
The American Journal of Law and Medicine has argued that the decision's failure to provide protections for mature minors and wards of the state was inconsistent with due process, and has urged reconsideration of the ruling. Winsor C. Schmidt, Jr., writing in the Journal of Psychiatry and Law, has criticized the decision, stating that its use of medical studies was "unsophisticated and noncomprehensive."

== See also ==
- Troxel v. Granville
- Involuntary commitment
- Due Process Clause
- Neurodivergence
