= Thoroddur Bjarnason =

Icelandic academic

- Þóroddur Bjarnason
- Education: University of Iceland, University of Essex, University of Notre Dame
- Known for: Adolescents, Alcohol abuse, Child custody
- Scientific career
- Fields: Sociology
- Workplaces: University of Akureyri
- Thesis: (2000)

Thoroddur Bjarnason is an Icelandic sociologist and professor at the University of Akureyri. He is most well known for his international comparative survey research on adolescents and their living and custody arrangements, alcohol consumption and substance abuse.

== Education and career ==
Bjarnason studied sociology at the University of Iceland obtaining his BA degree in 1991. In 1995, he received an MA degree in social science data analysis from the University of Essex in England, followed by a PhD in sociology from the University of Notre Dame in 2000. After four years as an assistant professor at the University at Albany, SUNY, he returned to Iceland in 2004 for a faculty position at the University of Akureyri.

== Scientific research ==
=== Alcohol use and substance abuse ===
Bjarnasson has studied adolescent alcohol use and substance abuse, comparing different European countries.

=== Child custody and living arrangements ===
In a 2005/06 international comparison of 36 western countries, Bjarnasson studied the proportion of 11-15-year-old children living in different child custody arrangements. The percent of children living in intact families with both their mother and father was highest in Macedonia (93%), Turkey (89%), Croatia (89%) and Italy (89%), while it was lowest in the United States (60%), Romania (60%), Estonia (66%) and Latvia (67%). Among the children who did not live with both their parents, the percent in a shared parenting versus sole custody arrangement was highest in Sweden (17%), Iceland (11%), Belgium (11%), Denmark (10%), Italy (9%) and Norway (9%), while it was lowest in Ukraine, Poland, Croatia, Turkey, the Netherlands and Romania, all with 2% or less.

== Selected publications ==
- Aldous J, Mulligan GM, Bjarnason T. Fathering over time: What makes the difference?. Journal of Marriage and the Family. 1998 Nov 1:809-20.
- Bjarnason T, Andersson B, Choquet M, Elekes Z, Morgan M, Rapinett G. Alcohol culture, family structure and adolescent alcohol use: multilevel modeling of frequency of heavy drinking among 15-16 year old students in 11 European countries. Journal of studies on alcohol. 2003 Mar;64(2):200-8.
- Hibell B, Guttormsson U, Ahlström S, Balakireva O, Bjarnason T, Kokkevi A, Kraus L. The 2007 ESPAD report. Substance Use Among Students in 35 European Countries. 2009;35:1-408.
- Bjarnason T, Arnarsson AA. Joint Physical Custody and Communication with Parents: A Cross-National Study of Children in 36 Western Countries, Journal of Comparative Family Studies, 2011, 42:871-890.
- Bjarnason T, Bendtsen P, Arnarsson AM, Borup I, Iannotti RJ, Löfstedt P, Haapasalo I, Niclasen B. Life satisfaction among children in different family structures: a comparative study of 36 western societies. Children & Society. 2012 Jan;26(1):51-62.
- Arnarsson A, Kristofersson GK, Bjarnason T. Adolescent alcohol and cannabis use in Iceland 1995–2015. Drug and alcohol review. 2018 Apr;37:S49-57.
