= Virtual visitation =

Virtual visitation is the use of electronic communication tools to provide contact between a parent and his or her children as part of a parenting plan or custody order. Virtual visitation includes many forms of communication, such as e-mail, instant messaging, and videoconferencing.

== History ==
In United States Law, virtual visitation refers to the right of a noncustodial parent to have electronic communication with his or her children. Virtual visitation first appeared in divorces in the late 1990s. Initially, virtual visitation was used to justify relocating away from a noncustodial parent. Now, states with virtual visitation laws do not allow virtual visitation as a justification to relocate a child away from a noncustodial parent. Virtual visitation law works for both parents to maintain contact with their children when they cannot be with the children in person. The court may decide the frequency and duration as a part of a parenting plan.

== States with virtual visitation laws ==
In 2004, Utah passed the first virtual visitation law in the United States, which permitted the automatic use of virtual visitation. The Utah Code Advisory Guidelines provides the courts guidance on using Virtual Parent-Time.

In 2006, Wisconsin became the second state to pass a virtual visitation law. The Wisconsin law defines virtual visitation as "electronic communication," which is the predominant term used in the other state laws. In 2007, Texas and Florida passed similar virtual visitation legislation. In 2009, North Carolina became the fifth state and Illinois the sixth to pass virtual visitation legislation.
