= Supervised visitation =

Form of child visitation involving another adult

Supervised visitation allows parents in high conflict or high risk situations access to their children in a safe and supervised environment. The noncustodial parent has access to the child only when supervised by another adult. Supervised visitation is used to protect children from potentially dangerous situations while allowing parental access and providing support for the parent child relationship.

== Legal status ==
Most countries recognize a parent's right to children, called visitation, residence, or contact. Most courts, including American and European, will allow the parent who does not have primary custody (the noncustodial parent) to have specified visitation and access to the child. In America the parents must establish a parenting plan setting out specific details. If the parents are not able to agree, the court may order specific possession and access or may appoint a parenting coordinator to assist the parents. The United States recognizes that parents have a constitutional right to their children (See Troxel v. Granville). In this case the United States Supreme Court stated that "the interest of parents in the care, custody and control of their children--is perhaps the oldest of the fundamental liberty interests recognized by this Court."

In most of the US states there is a law required that court-ordered parenting plans must set forth the minimum amount of parenting time and type of access (i.e. supervised/unsupervised) a non-custodial parent is entitled to have. According to the state laws and court guidelines, the Custody Supervisor cannot change the court order to make major modifications to the amount of parenting time and access, only minor changes or clarification of parenting time/access schedules or conditions including vacation, holidays, and temporary variation from the existing parenting plan are allowed.

== Purpose ==
The purpose of supervised visitation is to provide a safe and neutral environment for children to have a relationship with parents, and is often used in high conflict situations. Many courts take the position that it is better to make an error that protects the child as opposed to leaving a child at risk. There are many reasons supervised visitation may be needed:

- domestic violence,
- sexual abuse,
- drug abuse,
- mental illness,
- risk of international parental child abduction,
- general risk of child abduction,
- neglect,
- adoption,
- any other potentially dangerous family situations. This is true worldwide, for example, Child contact centre in England and Angel House in Texas have a similar purpose. While many countries have signed the Hague Convention which requires the return of victims of international parental child abduction, the best measure is prevention.

== Types ==
Supervised visitation has many forms, including one-on-one supervision, group supervision, neutral or monitored exchange, telephone or video monitoring, and therapeutic supervision. .

- One-on-one supervision is when a one parent and that parent's children are supervised alone, but some providers allow guest to also attend.
- Group supervision may include several parent-child groups in a larger areas, supervised by one or more monitors.
- Neutral or monitored exchange allows parents to pick up and drop off, or exchange the child for changes of possession, without direct contact with each other, minimizing conflict.
- Telephone or video monitoring has become more popular as people move around the world more, allowing for monitoring of telephone, videoconferencing, and other virtual visitation.
- Therapeutic supervision is conjoint parent-child therapy conducted by a licensed or certified mental health professional also trained to provide supervised visitation. This includes a student or intern in training for a post-graduate degree under the direct supervision of a licensed or certified mental health professional.

Friends or family members may be ordered or agree to supervise, or be present during supervised visitations. Professional providers may also be used, depending on the court order.

== Records ==
Most professional providers require intake forms or an application and maintain intake records. Privacy is of utmost concern, especially when there is a history of domestic violence. Many providers also document visits and maintain visit records. There is controversy over what, if any, records may be used in court.

In some programs, documentation and recordkeeping are supported by digital platforms used by supervised visitation agencies to record visit details and generate structured reports, such as "VisitProof"..

== Worldwide ==
Supervised visitation is growing worldwide to protect children from child abuse and child abduction. Supervised visitation bridges the gap between keeping the child safe and supporting the family relationship and parental rights. One constant, worldwide, is that supervised visitation has few legal guidelines as little legislation addresses it directly. However, many courts and state departments have set guidelines regarding supervised visitation.
