= Child custody =

Guardianship of an underage person

In family law, child custody describes the legal and practical relationship between a parent or guardian and a child in that person's care. Child custody consists of legal custody, which is the right to make decisions about the child, and physical custody, which is the right and duty to house, provide and care for the child. Married parents normally have joint legal and physical custody of their children. Decisions about child custody typically arise in proceedings involving divorce, annulment, separation, adoption or parental death. In most jurisdictions child custody is determined in accordance with the best interests of the child standard.

Following ratification of the United Nations Convention on the Rights of the Child in most countries, terms such as parental responsibility, "residence" and "contact" (also known as "visitation", "conservatorship" or "parenting time" in the United States) have superseded the concepts of "custody" and "access" in some member nations. Instead of a parent having "custody" of or "access" to a child, a child is now said to "reside" or have "contact" with a parent.

== Legal custody ==
Legal custody involves the division of rights between the parents to make important life decisions relating to their minor children. Such decisions may include choice of a child's school, physician, medical treatments, orthodontic treatment, counseling, psychotherapy and religion.

Legal custody may be joint, in which case both parents share decision-making rights, or sole, in which case one parent has the rights to make key decisions without regard to the wishes of the other parent.

== Physical custody ==
Physical custody establishes where a child lives and who decides day-to-day issues regarding the child. If a parent has physical custody of a child, that parent's home will normally be the child's legal residence (domicile). The times during which parents provide lodging and care for the child is defined by a court-ordered custody parenting schedule, also known as a parenting plan.

=== Forms ===
The different forms of physical custody include:

- Sole custody, an arrangement whereby only one parent has physical custody of the child. The other non-custodial parent would typically have regular visitation rights.
- Joint physical custody, a shared parenting arrangement where both parents have the child for approximately equal amounts of time, and where both are custodial parents.
- Bird's nest custody (also called nesting or birdnesting), a type of joint physical custody whereby the parents go back and forth from a residence in which the child always reside, placing the burden of upheaval and movement on the parents rather than the child.
- Split custody, an arrangement whereby one parent has sole custody over some children, and the other parent has sole custody over the remaining children.
- Alternating custody, an arrangement whereby the child lives for an extended period of time with one parent and an alternate amount of time with the other parent. This type of arrangement is also referred to as divided custody.
- Third-party custody, an arrangement whereby the children do not remain with either biological parent, and are placed under the custody of a third person.

=== Joint physical custody ===
Joint physical custody, or shared parenting, means that the child lives with both parents for equal or approximately equal amounts of time. In joint custody, both parents are custodial parents and neither parent is a non-custodial parent. With joint physical custody, terms such as "primary custodial parent" and "primary residence" have no legal meaning other than for determining tax status. The term "visitation" is not used in joint physical custody cases, but only for sole custody orders. In joint physical custody, the actual lodging and care of the child is shared according to a court-ordered custody schedule, also known as a parenting plan or parenting schedule.

=== Sole custody ===
Sole physical custody means that a child resides with only one parent, while the other parent may have visitation rights with their child. The former parent is the custodial parent while the latter is the non-custodial parent.

== Prevalence ==
Comparing 36 western countries in 2005/06, Thoroddur Bjarnason studied the proportion of 11-15-year-old children living in different child custody arrangements. The percent of children living in intact families with both their mother and father were highest in North Macedonia (93%), Turkey (89%), Croatia (89%) and Italy (89%), while it was lowest in the United States (60%), Romania (60%), Estonia (66%) and Latvia (67%). In the other anglophone countries, it was 70% in the United Kingdom, 71% in Canada and 82% in Ireland. Among the children who did not live with both their parents, the percent in a shared parenting versus sole custody arrangement was highest in Sweden (17%), Iceland (11%), Belgium (11%), Denmark (10%), Italy (9%) and Norway (9%). At 2% or less, it was lowest in Ukraine, Poland, Croatia, Turkey, the Netherlands and Romania. It was 5% in Ireland and the United States and 7% in Canada and the United Kingdom. Shared parenting is increasing in popularity, and by 2016/17, the percentage in Sweden had increased to 34% among the 6-12 year old age group and 23% among 13 to 18-year-old children.

== Jurisdiction ==
A child custody case must be filed in a court that has jurisdiction over the child custody disputes. Jurisdiction normally arises from the presence of the children as legal residents of the nation or state where a custody case is filed. However, some nations may recognize jurisdiction based upon a child's citizenship even though the child resides in another country, or may allow a court to take jurisdiction over a child custody case either on a temporary or permanent basis based upon other factors.

Forum shopping may occur both between nations and, where laws and practices differ between areas, within a nation. If a plaintiff files a legal jurisdiction that the plaintiff believes to have more favorable laws than other possible jurisdictions, that plaintiff may be accused of forum shopping.

The Hague Convention seeks to avoid this, also in the United States of America, the Uniform Child Custody Jurisdiction and Enforcement Act was adopted by all 50 states, family law courts were forced to defer jurisdiction to the home state.

== The "best interest" rule ==
In the context of cases regarding custody, the "best interest" rule suggests that all legal decisions made to accommodate the child are made with the goal of ensuring a child's happiness, security and overall well-being. There are many different factors that go into the decision that is made in a child's best interest, which include: the child's health, environment and social interests, the relationship each parent has with the child, and the ability of each parent to address the needs of the child.

=== Problems with the "best interest" rule ===
The "best interest" rule has been considered to be a standard in determining child custody for the most recent 40 years in history. Although it has been so widely favored amongst legal systems, there are some deficiencies to the concept. Robert Mnookin, an American lawyer, author, and a professor of law at Harvard Law School, claimed that the best interest rule is indeterminate. It is considered to be a broad and vague set of guidelines that only leads to increased conflict amongst the parents instead of promoting cooperation that would actually lead to the best interest of the child being met. Some of these problems specifically include:

- The current test for best interest generates high costs, which can impose on both the court and opposing parties.
- The verifiability of the best interest standard is hard to achieve. The privacy of family life makes assessing the evidence provided difficult. The best interests standard only worsens the problem, in which both parties are encouraged to introduce evidence of the quality of their parenting (which also promotes trying to disprove the opposing party's capabilities of taking the child into custody).
- In an example of divorce, both parties are experiencing high levels of stress, which could make for a poor basis for assessing family behaviors and relationships.

In order to better analyze the "best interest" of children, several experiments were conducted to observe the opinions of children themselves. Children of divorce were found to want equal time with both of their parents. Studies conducted by Wallerstein, Lewis and Blakeslee (2002) show that children from all age ranges indicate that equal or shared parenting is of their best interest 93 percent of the time. Several other studies were able to produce similar results, including Smart (2002), Fabricus and Hall (2003), Parkinson, and Cashmore and Single (2003). As a result, there has been a push to allow for joint custody of children in the most recent years, which strives to best meet the interests of the children and most evidently favors a gender neutral stance on the custody issue. However, the decision is highly situational, for joint custody can only be achieved in the absence of certain exceptions. For example, history of domestic violence found from either parent can most certainly trump the possibility of joint custody for a child.

== Economics ==
In an economic analysis, Imran Rasul has concluded that if one parent values child quality more than the other, the spouses prefer that parent to have sole custody, while joint custody is optimal for parents with relatively equal valuation of child quality. He has further concluded that "joint custody is more likely to be optimal when divorce costs fall, so that children retain contact with both parents" and that "this may improve child welfare".

== Gender issues ==
As the roles of children have changed over the past couple of centuries from economic assets to individuals, so has the role of mothers and fathers in who would provide the best care for the child. Many courts and judges lean more towards the maternal figure when there is a trial for custody of a child. According to Family Change and Time Allocation in American Families study done at UCLA, women allocate about 13.9 hours a week to child care while men allocate about 7 hours a week. Additionally, according to the Current Population Survey, in 2013, custodial mothers were more likely to have child support agreements (52.3 percent) comparative to custodial fathers (31.4 percent).

Women's and father's rights activists often become involved in matters of child custody since the issue of equal parenting is controversial, most of the time combining the interests of the child with those of the mothers or fathers. Women's rights activists are concerned about "family violence, recognizing primary caregiving, and inequities associated with awarding legal joint custody without a corresponding responsibility for child care involvement". Father's rights activists are more concerned about their "disenfranchisement from children’s lives, the importance of parent-child attachment, combating parental alienation, and access enforcement". Courts cannot determine an individual child's best interests with certainty, and judges are "forced to rely on their own interpretations of children’s interests, and idiosyncratic biases and subjective value-based judgments, including gender bias". Judges are currently using the 'best interest of the child' standard that was made to consider the interests of the child before the mothers and fathers, including the child's mental, emotional, physical, religious, and social needs.

Child poverty, lack of resources, and women's economic dependence on men all remain pressing issues that are not effectively noted during the custody trials.

== Australia ==
Each parent has a responsibility under the Australian Family Law Act 1975 for their children. The parental responsibility does not change in cases of separation or dysfunction between the two parents.

In the case of divorce or separation of parents many hurdles can fall in the way regarding the custody of their children, deciding who will be the custodial parent and so forth. In Australia when parents cannot come to an agreement which meets both of their needs when it comes to the custody of their child/ren cases are taken to the Family Court of Australia, which happens in more scenarios than expected. When parents cannot agree on these arrangements and take matters to court, the court makes orders about parental responsibilities, and have the power to approve and make consent orders.

== Czech Republic ==
In the Czech Republic, both parents are entrusted with child's custody until a court decides otherwise.

A divorce is possible only after a court decision on custody was rendered. A decision should be made within six months, however when parents fail to reach agreement the cases typically take much longer. The court decides with the child's best interest in mind. In case of children 12 years and older, the child's preference becomes key to the court ruling. Court may also refer parents to mediation, try "test modes" of various custody arrangements or request psychological and psychiatrical evaluation of children and parents. In exigent circumstances, a parent can file for preliminary injunction for custody or child support payments. The court must decide on whether to grant the injunction within seven days.

== India ==
In India, child custody laws primarily fall under personal laws specific to different religions and the secular Guardians and Wards Act, 1890. Here is an overview:

Hindu Law: For Hindus, the Hindu Marriage Act, 1955 and the Hindu Minority and Guardianship Act, 1956, govern child custody. The custody of a child under the age of five is usually granted to the mother, and for children above five, the court considers the child's welfare as the paramount factor.

Muslim Law: For Muslims, custody is governed by the personal laws of the parties involved. Generally, the mother gets custody of children until a certain age (Hizanat), after which the father gets custody.

Christian Law: For Christians, the Divorce Act, 1869, govern child custody. It is usually decided based on the welfare principle, considering the best interests of the child.

Parsi Law: Child custody for Parsis is governed by the Parsi Marriage and Divorce Act, 1936, where the court considers the welfare of the child as the main criterion.

Secular Law: The Guardians and Wards Act, 1890, is applicable to all communities and provides provisions for the appointment of guardians for minors and custody issues.

In custody matters, the courts in India focus on the best interests and welfare of the child. They consider factors such as the child's age, education, health, and emotional well-being while deciding custody. It is common for courts to grant joint custody or visitation rights to the non-custodial parent to ensure both parents maintain an active role in the child's life.

== Pakistan ==
In Pakistan, the Guardians and Wards Act, of 1890 is the principal law that governs child custody. Under that statute and case law, the governing principle in child custody determinations, whether to a parent or third party, is the welfare of the minor.

== United States ==
Looking at the history of child custody demonstrates how the views of children and the relationship between husbands and wives have changed over time. The view of children has changed from economic assets to individuals with their own interests. Fathers were also once seen as the head of the household compared to today, when fathers and mothers have more equal standing in the care of their children.

=== The colonial era and early republic: 1630-1830 ===
During this time period, custodial issues arose with occasions other than divorce such as the death of the father or both parents, inability of parents to care for the children, or with situations involving illegitimate children. Children at the time were seen as economic assets with labor value. In addition to this, the only other important consideration in determining custody was the ability of the adults to supervise and raise the child. Widows would lose their children because they would not be able to support them. These children would be taken from the mother and given to another family that would support the child in return for the child's labor services. Otherwise, fathers were seen as the head of the household and had complete custody rights to children.

=== The nineteenth century ===
The view of children as servants to their fathers and economic assets began to change in the nineteenth century. Children were seen to have interests of their own that were often associated with the care of a nurturing mother. The women's movement of the time also fought for women's right to child custody in their campaign. Judges eventually began to favor the "best interests of the child," which, especially for young and female children, was associated with mothers. Maternal presumption was judicially developed through legislature such as the "Tender Years Doctrine" that presumed that children should be placed with their mothers in custody debates. Granting custody to the father was seen "to hold nature in contempt, and snatch helpless, puling infancy from the bosom of an affectionate mother, and place it in the coarse hands of the father" when the mother was "the softest and safest nurse of infancy". This maternal presumption continued for over a hundred years. The only exception to maternal presumption was if the mother was considered to be "unfit." Most often, this occurred when women had committed adultery or left their husband.

=== The early twentieth century ===
By the early twentieth century, divorce cases became more common, and custody disputed simultaneously became an issue that affected many families. With the changing attitudes of the Roaring 20's, a woman's sexual conduct no longer prevented her from receiving custody for her children. The double standard on sexual conduct of fathers and mothers was removed. The new rule according to Keezer on the Law of Marriage and Divorce stated that "Where the children are of tender years, other things being equal, the mother is preferred as their custodian, and this more especially in the case of female children, and this though she may have been guilty of delinquencies in the past but there is no evidence that she was delinquent at the time of determining the matter by the court."

=== The late twentieth and early twenty-first centuries ===
In the late twentieth and early twenty-first centuries, divorce rates increased dramatically. Due to the nature of divorce, the rules governing child custody became increasingly difficult to determine. It was at this time that the idea of mothers being favored to gain custody of children in the event of a divorce was challenged. "The simple fact of being a mother does not, by itself, indicate a capacity or willingness to render a quality of care different from that which the father can provide", a New York court stated in 1973. It was at this time that the basis of the "best interest rule" was changed to address many aspects of the child's care in order to promote gender neutrality in decisions regarding custody. These aspects include the child's mental, emotional, physical, religious, and social needs. All children have the right to services that prevent them from physical or psychological harm. This means that when assessing the best interest of the child, it is not only important to assess the parents who are fighting for custody, but also the environments in which the child would be placed under the custody of either parent. In a situation where neither parent would be deemed an appropriate caretaker for a child, custody would be given to a foster care center.

In some states joint physical custody creates a presumption of equal shared parenting, however in most states, joint physical custody creates an obligation to provide each of the parents with "significant periods" of physical custody so as to assure the child of "frequent and continuing contact" with both parents. For example, U.S. states such as Alabama, California, and Texas do not necessarily require joint custody orders to result in substantially equal parenting time, whereas states such as Arizona, Georgia, and Louisiana do require joint custody orders to result in substantially equal parenting time where feasible. Courts have not clearly defined what "significant periods" and "frequent and continuous contact" mean, which requires parents to litigate to find out.

== See also ==
By country or culture

- Child custody laws in the United States
- Child support by country
- Divorce in Judaism
- Divorce of same-sex couples
- Residence in English law
- Shared residency in English law

Other topics

- Breakup
- Coparenting
- Divorce
- Family court
- Family law
- Fathers' rights
- Legal custody
- LGBT parenting
- Motherhood constellation
- Mothers' rights
- Noncustodial parent
- Parens patriae
- Parental alienation
- Parental alienation syndrome
- Parenting coordinator
- Parenting plan
- Physical custody
- Shared parenting
- Supervised visitation
- Tender years doctrine
- Triangulation (psychology)
- Ward of the state
