= Grandparent visitation =

Court-sanctioned visitation of grandchildren by grandparents

Grandparent visitation is a legal right that grandparents in some jurisdictions may have to have court-ordered contact (or visitation) with their grandchildren. In no case is contact between grandparents and children considered an inalienable right.

== United States ==
As of 2013, all US states have statutes that permit non-parents to ask a court to grant them the legal right to maintain ongoing contact with a child. In many states, these statutes explicitly name grandparents and great-grandparents as potentially eligible people. These requests must be justifiable as being in the best interests of the child, and they may only apply under certain circumstances, such as after one parent dies or loses custody.

State statutes pertaining to grandparent visitation must comport with the United States Supreme Court decision of Troxel v. Granville. This case, decided in 2000, involved a dispute between a widowed mother and her deceased partner's parents, the child's paternal grandparents. The mother limited the grandparents' time with her child, and the grandparents brought suit in Washington state. The trial court ruled that the paternal grandparents were entitled to visitation and set forth a schedule in its order, delineating when and where the grandparents were permitted to see their grandchild. The mother appealed the decision, arguing that the Washington statute was unconstitutional. Ultimately, the Supreme Court ruled that the statute was unconstitutional on its face (meaning that it could not be constitutionally applied in any circumstance), that the trial court had erred in requiring the mother to prove why visitation should not be granted rather than the placing the burden of proof on the petitioning party, and that the best interests standard alone is not enough to interfere with a parent's constitutional right to control the upbringing of their children.

State laws vary greatly, and no state guarantees that the petitioning grandparents will receive a court order granting them visitation. All states, however, require the best interests of the child to be a controlling factor upon certain standards being met.

=== Impact of Troxel v. Granville ===
In the case of Troxel v. Granville, the United States Supreme Court stated that "the interest of parents in the care, custody and control of their children–is perhaps the oldest of the fundamental liberty interests recognized by this Court." The Supreme Court also said that this fundamental right is implicated in grandparent visitation cases, when visitation orders are imposed over parental objection.

The court held that grandparent visitation laws were not unconstitutional on their face, as requested in the case. The Supreme Court declared that a parent's fundamental right to the "care, custody and control of their children" was "at issue in this case." They held that in order for state laws to be constitutional, three things need to be in the law:

1. If there is a claim or action filed, it is the grandparent that has the burden of proof;
2. The court should give "deference" to a "fit" parent's decision; and
3. The grandparent may still proceed with their request for grandparent visitation and overcome being denied contact; and each state should have a set of factors for the court to evaluate when deciding to either grant or deny a grandparent's request, over a parent's objections.

The Supreme Court ultimately ruled that the statute impermissibly interfered with a parents fundamental right to raise their child as they saw fit in that the statute was “breathtakingly over broad” and allowed anyone, biologically related or not, to, at any time, petition the court for an order granting them contact with a child.

State courts considering non-parent visitation petitions must apply "a presumption that fit parents act in the best interests of their children.". Troxel requires that state courts must give "deference" or some special weight to a fit parent's decision to deny non-parent visitation. "Choices [parents make] about the upbringing of children... are among constitutional rights, but were not an absolute right... sheltered by the Fourteenth Amendment against the State's unwarranted usurpation, disregard, or disrespect." This principle must inform the understanding of the "special weight" that Troxel requires courts to give to parents' decisions concerning their choices regarding how the grandparents will associate with their children. Even though Troxel does not define "special weight," previous Supreme Court precedent indicates that "special weight" is a strong term signifying very considerable deference. The "special weight" requirement, as illuminated by the Supreme Court in its previously decided cases, means that the deference provided to the parent's wishes will be overcome only by some compelling governmental interest and by overwhelmingly clear factual circumstances supporting that governmental interest.

== Italy ==
Limited grandparent visitation rights exist in Italy.
