= Troxel v. Granville =

- Supreme Court of the United States

Argued January 12, 2000 Decided June 5, 2000
- Full case name: Troxel et vir v. Granville
- Citations: 530 U.S. 57 (more) 120 S. Ct. 2054; 147 L. Ed. 2d 49; 2000 U.S. LEXIS 3767

Case history
- Prior: In Re Custody of Smith, 137 Wn.2d 1, 969 P.2d 21 (1998); cert. granted, 527 U.S. 1069 (1999).

Holding
- Parents have a fundamental right to control the upbringing of their children, and a law that allows anyone to petition a court for child visitation rights over parental objections unconstitutionally infringes on this right. Courts may not use a freestanding "best interest of the child" standard to overturn parental rights.

Court membership
- Chief Justice William Rehnquist Associate Justices John P. Stevens · Sandra Day O'Connor; Antonin Scalia · Anthony Kennedy; David Souter · Clarence Thomas; Ruth Bader Ginsburg · Stephen Breyer

Case opinions
- Plurality: O'Connor, joined by Rehnquist, Ginsburg, Breyer
- Concurrence: Souter (in judgment)
- Concurrence: Thomas (in judgment)
- Dissent: Stevens
- Dissent: Scalia
- Dissent: Kennedy

Laws applied
- U.S. Const. amend. XIV

Troxel v. Granville, 530 U.S. 57 (2000), is a case in which the Supreme Court of the United States struck down a Washington state law that allowed any third party to petition state courts for child visitation rights over parental objections. The Court held that parents have a fundamental right to direct the upbringing of their children, and that right is protected by the Due Process clause of the Fourteenth Amendment.

== Background ==
Brad Troxel was born on November 21, 1960 to Jenifer and Gary Troxel, a former member of the late 1950s-early 1960s doo-wop group The Fleetwoods. In 1989, he became romantically involved with Tommie Granville, who already had three children from a previous marriage. They never married, but had a sporadic relationship until 1991, out of which two daughters were born. After they broke up, the father lived with his parents and regularly brought his daughters to his parents' home for weekend visits. On May 13, 1993, Brad Troxel committed suicide, and in October 1993, Tommie Granville, now married to Kelly Wynn, expecting a child with him, and wanting him to adopt the daughters, informed Troxel's parents that she wished to limit visitations to once a month. The paternal grandparents petitioned to the Skagit County Supreme Court to obtain visitation rights with their granddaughters.

In 1995, the Washington Superior Court ordered that the grandparents have visitation one weekend per month, one week during the summer, and four hours on both of the petitioning grandparents' birthdays. The grandfather's career in The Fleetwoods was also highlighted by the Skagit County Superior Court judge, the grandparents themselves in their brief to the Supreme Court, and many newspaper articles about the case. In addition, Granville was ordered to not speak to the daughters about their father's suicide until a joint explanation had been agreed to with the grandparents. Granville appealed. Before addressing the merits of the case, the State Court of Appeals remanded for entry of written findings of fact and conclusions of law, citing the best interests of the children as reason for their decision. The Washington Court of Appeals reversed the lower court's decision, dismissed the grandparents' petition, and held that the limitations on non-parental visitation were consistent with "parents' fundamental liberty interest in the care, custody, and management of their children". The Washington State Supreme Court affirmed, and the U.S. Supreme court granted certiorari.

== Plurality ==
The Court plurality opinion, authored by Justice O’Connor, held that "the interest of parents in the care, custody and control of their children—is perhaps the oldest of the fundamental liberty interests recognized by this Court." That fundamental right is implicated in grandparent visitation cases, and as such, it struck down the Washington visitation statute because it unconstitutionally infringed on the right.

The Court noted that parents “act in the best interests of their children”. (quoting Parham v. J.R. (1979)). State courts considering non-parent visitation petitions must apply "a presumption that fit parents act in the best interests of their children." Troxel requires that state courts must give "special weight" to a fit parent's decision to deny non-parent visitation, as well as other decisions made by a parent regarding the care and custody of their children.

The plurality held that "choices [parents make] about the upbringing of children... are among associational rights... sheltered by the Fourteenth Amendment against the State's unwarranted usurpation, disregard, or disrespect." This principle must inform the understanding of the "special weight" that Troxel requires courts to give to parents' decisions. Even though Troxel does not define "special weight," previous Supreme Court precedent indicates that "special weight" is a term signifying very considerable deference.

The "special weight" requirement, as illuminated by these prior Supreme Court cases, means that the deference provided to the parent's wishes will be overcome only by some compelling governmental interest and by overwhelmingly clear factual circumstances supporting that governmental interest. This is essentially identical to the strict scrutiny standard, in keeping with the fundamental status of parental rights.

== Concurrences ==
Justice Souter questioned the Washington Supreme Court's holding, and the plurality's strong implication, that actual harm must be demonstrated before a parental decision may be questioned by a state authority. He instead argued that the statute was unconstitutional on its face due to overbreadth.

Justice Thomas applied strict scrutiny and reached the conclusion that "the State of Washington lacks even a legitimate governmental interest–to say nothing of a compelling one–in second-guessing a fit parent’s decision regarding visitation with third parties." However, Thomas questioned whether Meyer v. Nebraska and Pierce v. Society of Sisters were correctly decided, but floated the possibility that parental rights may be protected under the Privileges or Immunities Clause of the Fourteenth Amendment instead. Because neither party asked the Court to do so, Thomas did not reexamine the holdings of Meyer and Pierce.

== Dissent ==
Justice Scalia wrote that while the right of parents to direct the upbringing of their children is among the "unalienable Rights" with which the Declaration of Independence proclaims "all men ... are endowed by their Creator," and that right is also among the unenumerated "othe[r] [rights] retained by the people" under the Ninth Amendment, parents have no enforceable rights because they are not specifically enumerated in the Constitution.

Justice Stevens' opinion stated that parents have some rights under the Constitution, but that states may infringe upon them to guarantee the child's interest in a relationship with third parties. Stevens stated that parental rights may not be exercised in a way that a state court may deem to be "arbitrary", and that the best interest of the child standard was sufficient.

Justice Kennedy likewise argued that the best interest of the child standard may be applied, but the parent's decision should be given some weight, and stated that the judgment should be vacated and remanded to the Washington courts to determine whether the factual circumstances justified overturning Granville's decision. Kennedy also raised the concern that state family court procedures may be disrupted by the Court's holding.

== Legacy ==
The decision in Troxel v. Granville affected the interpretation of state laws granting grandparent visitation rights. The Troxel Court declined to decide whether the Due Process Clause requires nonparental visitation statutes to include a showing of harm in order to be valid, leaving the question open as to what governmental interests courts should consider in deciding if visitation is appropriate. Many states have upheld nonparental visitation statutes against Troxel challenges by distinguishing between statutes applying the "best interests" standard that gave equal weight to parental and nonparental claims and statutes that give extra weight to parental parties.

== See also ==
- List of United States Supreme Court cases, volume 530
- List of United States Supreme Court cases
- Lists of United States Supreme Court cases by volume
- Meyer v. Nebraska
- Pierce v. Society of Sisters
- Parham v. J.R.
- Family law
- Parental rights
