= Motherhood constellation =

Psychological changes during pregnancy

The motherhood constellation is a concept coined by Daniel N. Stern to describe the mental organization in which the child is most prominent. It describes that the primary caregiver's own biological readiness state. D. W. Winnicott referred to this state as primary maternal preoccupation.

== Stern ==
Psychoanalyst Daniel N. Stern has spent much of his research on what it means to become a mother and how this influences the development of the child. In his (1998) book, The Motherhood Constellation, Stern proposes that new mothers create a "motherhood constellation", wherewith to regard a newborn. This is a shift in mindset for a woman which she no longer is focus on her partner relationship. Instead, she focuses on her self and her baby. This new mind-set, depending on culture, personality and the like, forms a 'unique self-system, the motherhood constellation, which emerges during pregnancy and may last for many months or even years. During it, 'Mother's self-sense becomes largely organised around the presence of her baby, its well-being, and their mutual connection', and the mother becomes preoccupied with the protection of her child. The constellation may become less pre-eminent, but will never disappear: when the child is in danger, it will be reactivated immediately.

To be able to face the stressor of protecting her child, the mother needs what Winnicott termed a holding environment: an environment that will provide a psychologically framing in which she feels validated, encouraged and supported. Using this context, the mother is able to explore and develop her maternal behavior. A new mother will – even during the pregnancy - start forming a ‘maternal matrix’; a network that consists of several experienced mothers or parents, to strengthen the holding environment.

In his work Stern also refers to attunement of the caregiver: the responsiveness of parents to the communication of the child's needs. Mothers who engage in less attuned interactions with their child lack behaviors that encourage optimal levels of interaction. However, highly attuned mothers may not always rank high on “similarity of response” because they do not focus on the physical behavior of the infants to such an extent as is necessary for infant social awareness. Instead, adults tune into the infant's inner state without imitating the overt behavioral manifestations of the state.

== Therapy ==
Activation of the motherhood constellation means for the new mother that 'any issue she has concerning mothering and her own experience of being mothered will come to the forefront'. Where appropriate, therapy for the new mother can help modify and re-shape the motherhood constellation by offering 'an array of multiple possible mothers for the mother to become'. 'The mother's engagement in the therapeutic relationship provides her with several other possible mothers that she could realistically be or become and with several other mothers she could stop being or avoid becoming'.

== See also ==
- The Interpersonal world of the Infant
- Parenting
- Parental alienation
- LGBT parenting
