= Parenting coordinator =

A parenting coordinator (PC) is a court-appointed professional psychologist or lawyer who manages ongoing issues in high-conflict child custody and visitation cases.

At least eleven U.S. states had passed legislation regarding parenting coordinators: Colorado (since 2005), Idaho (2002), Louisiana (2007), New Hampshire (2009), North Carolina (2005), Oklahoma (2001), Oregon (2002), Texas (2005), and Florida (2009), and Massachusetts (2017).

== Concepts ==
The Parenting Coordinators are usually of two types: licensed professionals in a mental health or pastoral field of counseling, or attorneys who are in good standing with their state's Bar Association. The parenting coordinator usually meets with both parties regularly, receives day-to-day questions and complaints about any aspect of a party's conduct, and makes recommendations to the parties. These recommendations effectively become obligatory for parents to follow because the Parental Coordinator can later testify in court about the non-compliance. PC have extremely wide range of issues they can decide on parents' relations with their children, including but not limited to:

- In most of the states, there is a law required that court-ordered parenting plans must set forth the minimum amount of parenting time and access (i.e. supervised/unsupervised) a non-custodial parent is entitled to have. According to laws of many states and AFCC guidelines, the Parenting Coordinator cannot change the court order, only the minor changes or clarification of parenting time/access schedules or conditions including vacation, holidays, and temporary variation from the existing parenting plan is allowed.
- PC can limit where parents can and cannot go during his/her daily routine with the child, and what activities are allowed.
- PC can prevent parents from discussing certain topics with their children in their conversations.
- PC can take complaints from either party about almost any subject of the other parties conduct during the past visit, and make decisions the parties must abide by. For example, PC can decide what sports kids will attend, what friends they can visit, what religious services to attend, what food parents can feed them and more.
- PC can make decisions in cases when the parties do not agree on child non-urgent medical care.
- PC can decide when, where, and how the non-custodial parent's family and friends are allowed to see the children.
- PC can report suspected child abuse to Child Protective Services;
- and many other issues that can be considered in the children's best interests.

Any party that does not agree with the parenting coordinator recommendations can file a motion, asking the court to decide the disputed issue. Either party can also ask the court to appoint a new parenting coordinator to the case, but has to provide sufficient evidence to convince the court that valid reasons exist.

=== Financial charges ===
Parental coordinators charge parents involved for the time they have spent with the children according to the rates they have established as mental health or law professionals. Parents normally split the charges according to their court order.

=== Guidance and oversight ===
Parental Time Coordination is controlled and reviewed by boards of mental health professionals who are often involved in the supervision of parental time themselves. If a complaint to the board is filed, and either the complaining party or the PC believes that the complaint cannot be resolved, either party can file a motion to the court to terminate the PC's services. The boards of mental health professionals have very limited authority in regulation of civil rights violations, because only US state and federal courts have jurisdiction and authority to ensure protection of and to redress deprivation of rights secured by Law.

The Association of Family and Conciliation Courts (AFCC) publishes guidelines and standards. These include Guidelines for Parenting Plan Evaluations in Family Law Cases (2022), which replaces Model Standards of Practice for Child Custody Evaluation (2006). AFCC explains:

"the Model Standards have been renamed Guidelines, highlighting that AFCC does not intend them to define mandatory practice or to be used to create rules or standards of liability....The term Child Custody Evaluations has been replaced with Parenting Plan Evaluations. This reflects an important shift away from the term 'child custody,' which connotes possession and control of children rather than responsibility for their care."

=== Limitations ===
According to a 2005 AFCC guideline, PCs should make only minor adjustments to parenting time schedules, but cannot modify the court order:

AFCC Guidelines (May 2005):
E. A PC shall refrain from making decisions that would change legal custody and physical custody from one parent to the other or substantially change the parenting plan. Such major decisions are more properly within the scope of judicial authority. PCs may need to make temporary changes in the parenting plan if a parent is impaired in their functioning and incapable of fulfilling their court-ordered parenting functions until further information and assessment is obtained and the court has assumed decision-making responsibility.

In the case of Hastings v. Rigsbee, Court of Appeal in Florida stated "it is never appropriate for a parenting coordinator to act as a fact-finder or otherwise perform judicial functions". The lower court order that was entered on the hearsay testimony of the coordinator was reversed and remanded. Appellate Division of the NY Supreme Court noted in Grisanti v. Grisanti case that "it was improper for the court to condition future visitation on the recommendation of a mental health professional". Similarly, in Rueckert v. Reilly the same court said: "mother correctly contends that the court improperly delegated its authority when it directed the court-appointed expert to determine the frequency and duration of the mother's supervised visitation...In addition, the [lower] court should not have required the mother to pay the cost of visitation without determining the "economic realities," including her ability to pay and the cost of the visitation service." Court of Appeals of Oregon "conclude[d] that the trial court plainly erred in denying husband parenting time without making appropriate findings" and reversed the order that erroneously granted PC the "authority to deny husband parenting time". Idaho Supreme Court stated: "The goal of a parenting coordinator is to empower the parties and minimize conflict in resolving parenting disputes. The judicial function of final decision-maker remains with the court and is not delegated through." There were several other appellate court decisions that prohibited deferral to a parenting coordinator custody and parenting time enforcement issues.

There is a possibility of a conflict of interest when the same psychologist provides Custody Evaluation and appoints himself to Parental Coordinator role, so laws in many states and AFCC guidelines explicitly prohibit this practice. However, in small communities, the choice of PC can be very limited.

=== Removal ===
Judges are often opposed to remove parenting coordinator requirement from the high-conflict cases, but the court can assign a different PC to the parents when a conflict arises with the current PC. Sometimes PCs continue to be involved with family for several years, which can cost thousands of dollars to both parties. PCs, however, have the right to resign when a complaint is filed against them with psychologists licensing board, or when lawsuit is filled with State or Federal Court. In this case the parties may ask court that a new PC be assigned. There are also recommendations from AFCC that "PC shall not serve when a conflict of interest arises when any relationship between the PC and the participants or the subject matter of the dispute compromises or appears to compromise a PC's impartiality".

== Controversy ==
According to some lawyers, guideline documents from the psychologist boards have a lot of inspirational statements, but not malfeasance oversight to protect parents and children from abuse of power by the parenting coordinator. In some cases, the court order may be missing mandatory state requirement to set forth the minimum amount and access of parenting time for noncustodial parent, which can cause the parenting coordinator to step into judicial authority territory since they will be able to modify amount of the parenting time or change supervised/unsupervised arrangement of the visits - exceeding the parenting coordinator scope of authority allowed by state laws and AFCC guidelines. This can cause an appeal of the court order that appointed the parenting coordinator or a civil rights lawsuit.

Many parents and lawyers find it very hard to justify the reasons for the parenting coordinator's decisions and financial charges. There is a possible conflict of duties since the parenting coordinator has broad powers when deciding on parents' conflict resolution; i.e. they can establish rules, decide whether parents follow the rules, punish parent who do not follow the rules, and get financial interest from the time they spend. This may lead some parenting coordinator to motivate parents to report every minor problems and suggestions to the parenting coordinator that can lead to delay of conflict resolution between parents. Because the parenting coordinator gets paid for their involvement, there is a financial incentive and therefore a conflict of interest built into the parenting coordinator process.

Unlike court proceedings where legal standards govern changes and judgments bring closure to issues, the parenting coordinator process is open ended and continuous. For example, Massachusetts law requires that the party requesting a change to the visitation schedule show a material change in the circumstances and also that the requested change is necessary in the best interests of the child. No similar standards and limits apply to the parenting coordinator process. As a result, one of the parents can repeatedly request meetings to change the schedule without satisfying any legal standards and to otherwise use the parenting coordinator process to engage the other parent in unnecessary and constant conflict for improper motives and over the same resolved matters. The parenting coordinator may not be motivated to stop such abuse because escalation and prolonging of the conflict would benefit the coordinator financially.

There also was an official debate in Oklahoma Legislature that parenting coordination can interfere with civil liberties and conflict with Fourth Amendment: Common civil liberties include the rights of people, freedom of religion, and freedom of speech, and additionally, the right to due process, to a trial, to own property, and to privacy. The debate stemmed around the fact that the coordinator can demand to know details about parties conversations, check on conditions of their house, ask questions about their personal life, disregard rules of evidence laws, get copies of documents without a warrant request, make decisions which exceeds their authority, since the PC has the power to control and regulate many aspects of parent time with their child up to recommending court to limit parent contact with child. The Fourteenth Amendment to the United States Constitution says that a state may not make a law that "abridge the privileges or immunities of citizens of the United States" and no state may "deprive any person of life, liberty, or property, without due process of law; nor deny to any person within its jurisdiction the equal protection of the laws." Title 42 United States Code Section 1983 states that citizens can sue any person that acting under a color of law to deprive the citizens of their civil rights under the pretext of a regulation of a state. Oklahoma was the first state to pass a PC statute and also the first state to later determine the statute to be unconstitutional. As a result, the statute has been amended, see Title 43 Oklahoma Statutes Supp.2003 § 120.3 for details. Currently, the scope of practice has been limited to rendering only "minor and temporary" decisions. Later, Supreme Judicial Court of Massachusetts also declared parental coordinator appointment unconstitutional, because of the "unlawful delegation of judicial decision-making authority".

== See also ==
- Contact (law)
- Supervised visitation
- Parental alienation
- Shared parenting
