= Parenting plan =

Child custody plan included in a marital separation agreement or final decree of divorce

A parenting plan is a child custody plan that is negotiated by parents, and which may be included in a marital separation agreement or final decree of divorce. Especially when a separation is acrimonious to begin with, specific agreements about who will discharge these responsibilities and when and how they are to be discharged can reduce the need for litigation. Avoiding litigation spares parties not only the financial and emotional costs of litigation but the uncertainty of how favorable or unfavorable a court's after-the-fact decision will be. Moreover, the agreement itself can authorize the employment of dispute-resolution methods, such as arbitration and mediation, that may be less costly than litigation.

== Drafting a parenting plan ==
A well-drafted parenting plan addresses both the custodial rights and responsibilities of parents who share custody of a minor child or children, and the logistical and other procedures for carrying out its substantive requirements. Parents can agree to a plan that takes into consideration their children's ages and needs and, if they continue to co-parent effectively, can adjust their plans over time to ensure that their plan remains in the best interest of their children.

=== Guidelines ===
Some jurisdictions have guidelines, either default rules (i.e., rules that apply only in the absence of provisions to the contrary) or hard-and-fast requirements to which all agreements must adhere, addressing the content of parenting plans. Moreover, courts in some communities offer proposed templates whose terms take into account community-specific factors such as availability of day-care services, school-bus routes and schedules, and schedules of school and community athletics and other activities.

=== Content ===
Topics addressed in a parenting plan may include, but are not limited to:

- Physical custody (how the child's time is to be divided between the separating parents and their separate households; a well-drafted plan will specifically contemplate holidays and school vacations)

- Transferring the child from one parent to the other: schedule, method, and location
- Departures from the typical custody schedule (e.g., overnight stays with the other parent or with other relatives during a given parent's normal custody time)
- Restrictions, as needed, on places visited and/or persons associated with while the child is present

- Legal custody (decision-making authority and rights to information)

- Authority over physical and mental health-care decisions; access to health records
- Authority to change the place at which a child resides while in the physical custody of a given parent
- Authority over educational decisions such as where the child attends school; access to educational records
- Authority to take the child on travel, especially travel outside the geographic jurisdiction of the court adjudicating the separation or divorce
- Authority to claim the child as a dependent for income-tax purposes

- Financial support obligations:

- Provision for basic needs
- Payment for education
- Payment of health-insurance premiums and other medical expenses
- Inclusion of the other parent and/or the child in a given parent's estate planning, including both the probate process (disposition of assets by will) and procedures outside of probate (payout of life-insurance policies, distribution of survivor benefits, etc.)

- Communication between parents:

- Obligation to keep the other parent apprised of contact information both of a given parent and of the child while with that parent
- Right of the other parent to information about circumstances and events affecting the child's well-being

- Procedures for resolving disputes, including but not limited to disputes about the meaning of the plan's language and disputes alleging improper performance of the plan's provisions

- Provisions, if desired, for alternative dispute resolution such as arbitration and mediation

In some cases, parenting plans may be established through the combined effect of multiple agreements each addressing a different subject. For example, one agreement may address physical custody while another addresses financial support.

=== Entry by a court ===
A parenting plan agreed upon by the parties in an out-of-court setting is often termed "endorsed", "stipulated" or "on consent." A judge who finds a stipulated parenting plan to be consistent with the child's best interest may be able approve the plan without requiring the parties or the child to be present in court, sparing the parents inconvenience and the child the emotional stress of dealing with authority figures in an unfamiliar setting.

== Australia ==
Parenting Plans in Australia are a written agreement between two parents and are made without the assistance or endorsement of a court, but can be made with the assistance of a mediator. Parenting plans can include as many or as few considerations about the child or children as both parents agree to. However child support payments are not generally included as payable child support is calculated by the Australian Government Child Support Agency (CSA).

Parenting plans are non-binding and not legally enforceable but may be written in such a way that they can submitted to a court for endorsement. Once endorsed the parenting plan becomes a binding consent order. Even if not endorsed by a court so as to be legally enforceable, if legal action is initiated after a parenting plan has been agreed between the parents, the court will give careful consideration and considerable weight to the agreed plan as it shows the intent of each parent at the time of signing.

There is no such thing as a "standard" parenting plan as each one is unique, but unofficial example parenting plans are available.

== Belgium & the Netherlands ==
The parental plan is introduced in the legislation in the Netherlands and there is a law project in Belgium to introduce it is, as well.

== Great Britain ==
In England and Wales the Children and Family Court Advisory and Support Service, a non-departmental public body, produces a booklet Parenting Plans Putting your children first: a guide for separating parents.

== Romania ==
Upon the introduction of the joint-custody in the national legislation in Romania, a standard parenting plan was released with the public. Parental plans appeared for the first time with the mediation law, which provided in Articles 2 and 64 that parents may be mediated about how to raise children after divorce. Thus, although in Romania, in 2006-2011, only the notion of single custody was actually applicable in fact through mediation agreements, mediators have implemented legal arrangements for joint legal custody. The plan was adapted to the specific of Romania and it is now being used by the mediators across the county. Due to the introduction (as of October 2011) of the joint parental authority, the notion of parental plan has legal support through, Article 506 of the new Civil Code. There is a proposal of non-governmental associations to implement the parental plan in tertiary legislation (implementation guide under the aegis of authorized institutions), but also to introduce this plan into primary legislation (these are amendments to Law 272/2004 initiated by the DGPC).

== United States ==
In the United States, many state courts require that separating or divorcing couples who have children include a parenting plan among the terms of their separation agreement and/or their eventual divorce decree. When a court approves an agreement, the court may enforce it later; by contrast, if parents reach informal agreement with each other and do not notify the court that the agreement exists, the court cannot enforce it.

Studies in the 1990s found that parents who mediated to try to agree on a parenting plan ended up with a resolution to their case faster and more cheaply than parents who litigated.

Parenting plans are usually initiated as part of a divorce decree or custody case between unmarried parents. Divorced parents whose child custody is governed by a parenting plan can request that a court amend the plan or replace it with a new one. In jurisdictions whose laws permit the practice, some plans permit the parties to amend certain provisions, such as those specifying where a parent will live during that parent's time with the child, by agreement without court approval.

A court reviewing a petition for amendment or replacement of a court-ordered parenting plan will employ the "child's best interest" standard in light of circumstances or changes in circumstances such as a parent's relocation, the presence or absence of child abuse in one or both parents' households, and health problems of a parent or the child. If the parents in a custody dispute request, many states allow children who are old enough to state an informed preference, to testify about their own preferences as to custody and parenting time, with their opinion taken into consideration by the court along with all other evidence relating to their best interest. The weight assigned by the court to a child's testimony will vary with factors such as the child's intellectual and psychological maturity, for which the child's age is often used as a proxy; the child's level of insight into his or her situation; and the credibility of the child's testimony as affected by factors ranging from the child's level of honesty to any undue influence on the child by either or both parents.

Most states require that court-ordered parenting plans set forth the minimum amount of parenting time and access to which a noncustodial parent is entitled. In these states, an agreement's failure to specify the non-custodial parent's minimum level of access can constitute grounds for appeal of the adjudicating court's approval of the plan. In cases where separated or divorced parents live near each other, most U.S. states' family courts grant shared custody. Where parents live farther apart, states such as Florida, Oregon, New Hampshire and New York allow the combination of these visits into longer stretches of time to reduce traveling.

== See also ==
- Family dispute resolution
