= Fathers' rights movement in the United Kingdom =

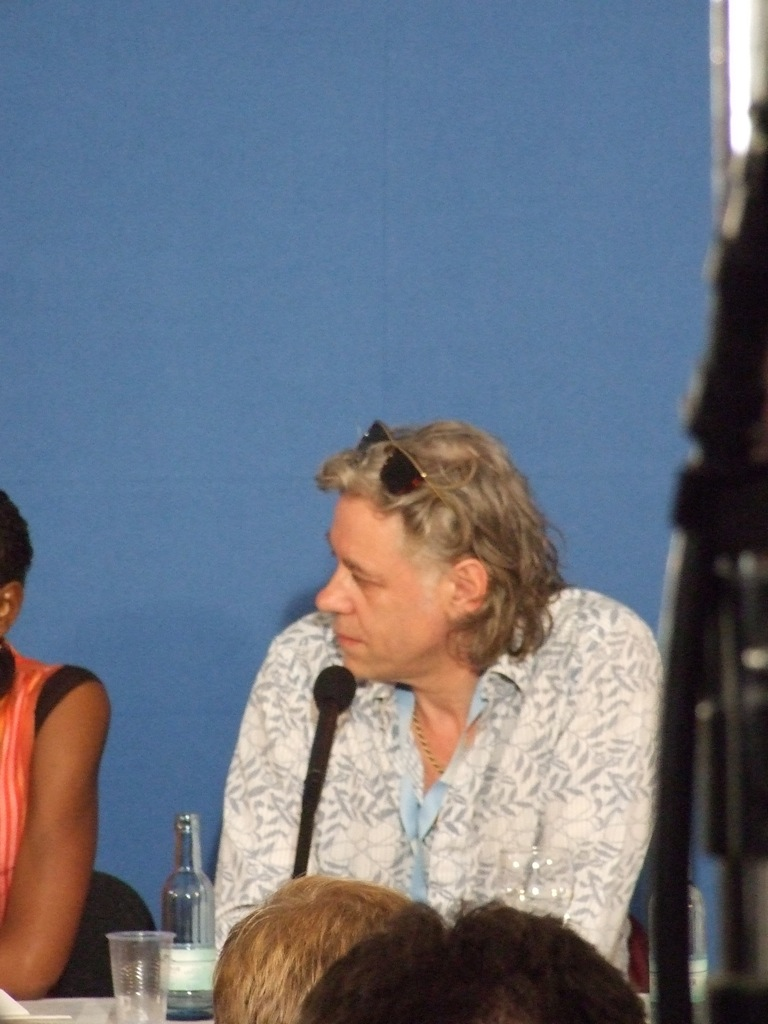
Fathers' rights activist Bob Geldof

The fathers' rights movement in the United Kingdom consists of a large number of diverse pressure groups, ranging from charities (regulated by the Charity Commission) and self-help groups to civil disobedience activists in the United Kingdom, who started to obtain wide publicity in 2003. Studies show the majority of the UK population support the need for change and protection of fathers rights to meet the responsibility through 50:50 contact. The movement's origin can be traced to 1974 when Families Need Fathers (FNF) was founded. At the local level, many activists spend much time providing support for newly separated fathers, most of whom are highly distraught. Although some have been accused of being sexist by some commentators, these groups also campaign for better treatment for excluded mothers, women in second marriages, other step-parents and grandparents – all of whom suffer discrimination in respect of contact with their (grand) child(ren).

The advent of Fathers 4 Justice in 2003 brought the cause into the mainstream media for the first time, and new legislation was brought in the United Kingdom as a result in 2005. Another leading group, Families Need Fathers, is recognised as source of help by The Department of Constitutional Affairs, and regularly provides evidence to parliamentary sub-committees, resulting on one senior Family Court judge indicating that it was a key player in the debate about on-going contact and joint residence.

Activists within the movement seek to restructure family law, arguing that children benefit from being raised by both parents, and that children should thus be allowed to interact with both parents on a regular basis as of right. The family justice system in England and Wales, according to a committee of Members of Parliament on 2 March 2005, gives separated and divorced fathers a raw deal and does not give enough consideration to preserving the relationship between the father and the child.

The Child Support Act in the United Kingdom aims to ensure that absent parents pay towards the support of their children. The payment amount is inversely proportional to the time that the child spends with the so-called absent parent. If a parent puts acceptable reasons to a court for the other parent's involvement to be restricted, then the restricted parent has to pay more. Many judgements have been criticised for not allowing fathers to be as involved as they would like to be or at all, and the courts criticised for failing to enforce their orders. Pressure from the fathers' movement has influenced the United Kingdom Government, which published a draft Children (Contact) and Adoption Bill in February 2005. This aims to widen judges' powers in dealing with parents who obstruct their ex-partner from seeing their children.

== Fathers rights issues ==
There are a number of issues which drive the participants in the fathers' rights movement:

- Residence with the children is rarely given to the father after divorce or separation.
- Shared residence (and shared parenting) is seldom used as an expedient to resolve family child residency disputes, frequently resulting in fathers being marginalised and unable to perform effectively in their capacity as fathers.
- When contact is denied, the courts frequently do not enforce their own orders.
- Whereas mothers get parental responsibility automatically, fathers only do so if they were married to the mother or signed the birth certificate, or if the mother agrees.
- Fathers are obliged to pay means tested child support irrespective of whether they are allowed to see their children, and with no account taken of the mother's household's income.
- Contact centre places are hard to obtain because of inadequate funding and at the same time their use is frequently demanded unreasonably – resulting in children being unnecessarily deprived of the love and care of their non-resident parent.
- When a father makes representations in court to see his child when this is being obstructed by the mother, adversarial court proceedings against the mother are inevitably the cause of further conflict. If a court can determine that a child should see its father, this could be done without reference to the mother, who may be deemed irrelevant to the proceedings in cases of implacable hostility.

== Leading groups ==
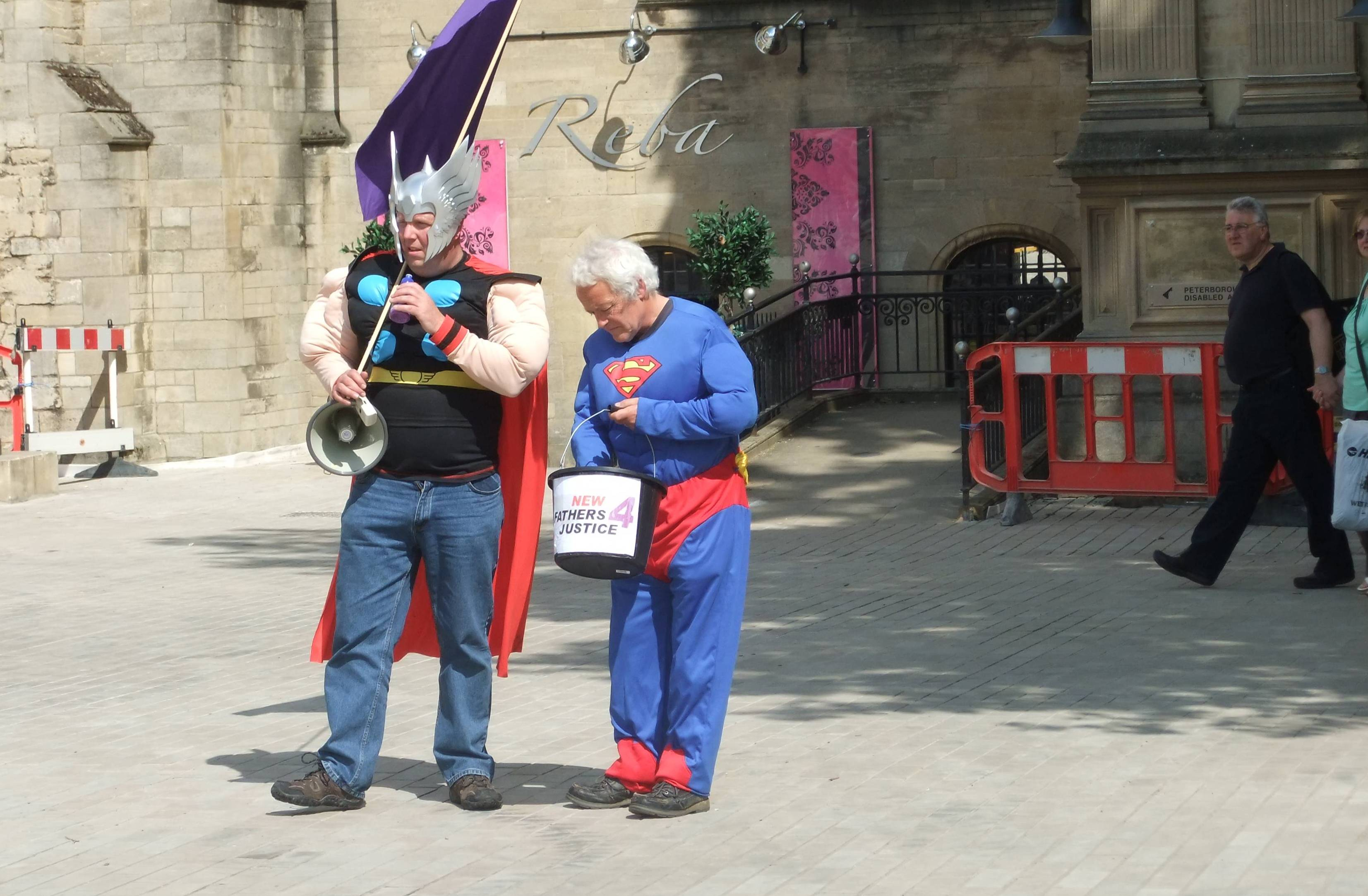
Two Fathers 4 Justice members protest in Peterborough in 2010.

Fathers 4 Justice (F4J) takes a proactive approach to generating awareness of fathers' issues. It generates considerable publicity through planned actions e.g. throwing purple (its campaign colour) flour at the Prime Minister, and Batman landing on Buckingham Palace. It organises stylish and colourful dress-up demonstrations as part of its campaign of direct action. Their actions have been described as totally irresponsible and yet the attendant publicity, coordinated by Matt O'Connor, may be said to have informed the British public of an issue that others had failed to do hitherto.

== Political lobbying ==
Father's rights groups in the United Kingdom were largely ineffective at political lobbying up until recently. Effective lobbyists, however, have included Families Need Fathers (FNF), whose ideas were included in the Adoption and Children Act 2002 regarding the automatic granting of parental responsibility to fathers when their name appears on a child's birth certificate. Tony Coe has been an articulate proponent of a singular message, and appeared in 2004 on a TV programme with Bob Geldof and Jim Parton, the editor of the FNF newsletter. The 2005 Children and Contact Bill addresses one of the expressed concerns of Fathers For Justice. If remains to be seen in the United Kingdom whether providing evidence to Select committees is a more effective tactic than performing publicity stunts.

Government ministers for a long time denied that there is a problem until 2004. Lord Filkin, the family justice minister announced at the beginning of April 2004 that there will be a green paper outlining proposals intended to improve the methods used to settle child residence disputes. This paper, Parental Separation: Children’s Needs and Parents' Responsibilities is seen by activists to not seriously address the fundamental issues, particularly the courts' generation of inter-parental conflict by making it necessary to have adversarial proceedings.

In the Queen's Speech at the State Opening of Parliament on 27 November 2004, Her Majesty said:

My Government believes that the welfare of children is paramount. Draft legislation will be published to safeguard the welfare of children in circumstances of parental separation and inter-country adoption.

F4J achieved its main objective of bringing to the issues to the public's attention, creating fear in men who have not yet faced the dilemmas of divorce that their relationship with their children could be devastated if they fell out with their partners. By having generated this fear, campaigners are optimistic that governments must now be seen to be actually doing something that will palliate public concerns and fears. However, there is also a "wait and see" mentality being applied within Government departments, as it is the judiciary, by using recent precedents, who have the greatest power to bring about change. The success of the charity, FNF, for instance, in advising members to act as a litigant in person and to work towards shared residency court orders, has resulted in changing judicial attitudes. It is capitalising on that success and has spawned an industry of providing information and help to fathers (and, increasingly, mothers) facing family break-own.

The Labour Party has this to say on the issue in its 2005 Election Manifesto:

For those parents who do separate or divorce, both have a responsibility for a meaningful relationship with their children where that is safe. We are introducing reforms to minimise conflict and encourage conciliation by greater and early use of mediation. We stand by the principle that absent parents should make a fair contribution to the cost of the upkeep of their children, and we are committed to tackling the backlog of Child Support Agency claims as efficiently and fairly as possible. We also need to ensure court orders on access are enforced according to the best interests of the child, which ideally gives both parents an important role.

=== Legal issues ===
The new system in the United Kingdom whereby the amount of child support that, in the vast majority of cases, the father pays, is acknowledged to be less fair than the old because it has ceased to take into account the other household's income. This is justified on the grounds that it saves administrative cost for the government agency concerned.

There are issues to do with the non-enforcement of Contact Orders – orders made by family court judges which oblige the so-called resident recalcitrant parent (usually the mother) to let the children spend some time with their dad. Such orders are not required if the mother is cooperative about letting the children see their dad, but generally speaking no action is taken if such an order is made and the mother is uncooperative.

The main issue, however, is to do with the adversarial nature of the system, in which most parents are dissatisfied, according to a United Kingdom government report published in 2004, and the only winners are lawyers.

Also justified on the grounds of administrative convenience is the United Kingdom system whereby child benefit is only payable to one parent, even when both separated parents provide substantial portions of the childcare. In a Court of Appeal judgment in February 2005, in a landmark (HOCKENJOS v. SOS JGT) ruling, Lord Justice Ward declared "To allow a father nothing for the maintenance of the child when he shares care virtually equally is so unfair that no reasonable secretary of state should countenance it." He said that the practice of making just one parent responsible for a child under the benefits system was "grotesque... It is degrading to fathers who actually – and lovingly – tend to their children. A law so framed is so far removed from reality that it brings the law into disrepute and justifiably fuels the passions of protesting fathers."

=== Recent reform ===
The publication of the Green Paper together with the item in the Queen's Speech may not deliver much immediately, but if it can be established early on in the process which aspects of any proposed new legislation will become retrospective then there is opportunity for it to start having an immediate social impact.

There was a debate on the topic of Family Justice on 13 December 2004 in the House of Commons. The motion:

That this House agrees that on the separation of parents, priority should be given to the interests of the children; believes that it is in the best interests of all children for both parents to be fully involved in their upbringing and hence that separated parents should each have a legal presumption of reasonable contact with their children, except where a child's safety would be at risk, so that children are able to benefit from being parented by both their parents, as well as from contact with any grandparents and extended family members able and willing to play a role in their upbringing; regrets the Government's opposition to such a legal presumption, which will lead to yet more children being denied access to both their parents and their extended families; views with concern the Government's failure to implement the Early Intervention Project; and calls on the Government to replace the legal term 'contact' with 'parenting time', to introduce a legal presumption of co-parenting and to introduce early intervention in parental separation, with court-backed mediation and guidelines on parenting-time.

It was defeated by with 168 Ayes and 283 Noes voted by MPs.

==== Making Contact Work ====
In 2001 Mr Justice Wall (now Lord Justice) chaired a Children Act Sub-Committee (known as CASC).

They reported in March 2002 in a document called "Making Contact Work".

It called for "urgent reform". It was a sort of Hutton Inquiry of family law reform. It is well known that Wall LJ was very vexed that nothing happened for a long time.

The Facilitation and Enforcement stakeholder group was however created to discuss the CASC report. Stakeholders included a couple of district judges, a solicitor, a barrister, CAFCASS, Women's Aid, various academics, mediators...

The report went to Minister Margaret Hodge in June 2003 and the response was a Green Paper in 2004.

CASC, and the stakeholder Group could be called Prong No. 1 of reform, which was started off by the politicians, after pressure from several directions, including from the campaigning charity FNF.

The impression formed by many involved at the time was that the government had no true appetite for reform, and hoped that the problem would just go away.

==== Fathers 4 Justice ====
Fathers 4 Justice have had success in bringing the subject to the nation's attention at a bottom-up grass-roots level, (rather than at the top-down political level of the CASC group, and the stakeholder group.)

However, the true size of Fathers 4 Justice is a matter of opinion. While the organization claims to have over 25,000 members in five countries, its main base of operations is the United Kingdom and there appear to be fewer than 20 actual members who conduct regular civil disobedience actions – namely Jason Hatch and Jolly Stansby.

The results of their campaigning remains to be seen. While they are a fixture in the United Kingdom, they have yet to pull off a successful action in the United States or in Canada. The Canadian branch of Fathers 4 Justice has existed for 15 months and has yet to make national headlines.

==== Early intervention ====
This is the work of Oliver Cyriax. He has run two conferences about early interventions in 2001 and 2002. These were attended by high-ranking members of the judiciary, including from overseas, where schemes that promote retaining both parents' involvement in childcare, but leave the courts as last resort, have been very successful. Notably in Florida and California.

He has a strong alliance, made up of senior members of the Solicitors Family Law Association (SFLA), Family Law Bar Association (FLBA), Hamish Cameron the child psychiatrist, Fathers Direct and the campaigning charity Families Need Fathers. Ex-president of the United Kingdom Family Division of the courts Dame Elizabeth Butler-Sloss has said she supports this plan.

Observers indicate that there is currently a tug-of-war between Oliver Cyriax's early interventions pilot project – which would be run by PESF (Parenting and Education Support Forum) in a low key way, probably at Wells Street (the family court in central London) – and another plan, created by the civil servants.

The worry about the civil servants is that they are not expert in family matters at all, and their pilot plan might fail. The civil servant behind it, Bruce Clark, comes from a child protection background. He is said to be the man who drew up the discredited Munchausen's guidelines, and not a natural champion of fathers rights' that campaigners demand, in particular to ensure that children will have adequate parenting time with their fathers.

Fathers' rights campaigners urgently want an "Early Interventions Pilot Plan" to test and develop compulsory mediation and parenting plans, etc. backed up by a strict enforcement regime, "Facilitation and Enforcement" as the stakeholder group was called.

It is not clear who will win the tug-of-war, and campaigners argue that both initiatives are worthwhile. Duncan Fisher of Fathers Direct says Oliver Cyriax's PESF scheme could start immediately, although it is known that civil servants and politicians are prone to call for numbers of rounds of committee meetings and consultations, sometimes indefinitely.

===== Every Day Matters =====
It is arguable that the recent Consultation Paper issued by CAFCASS and entitled is a recognition of the hurt and resentment caused by the existing Family Law system, and is a call for radical change, particularly by the early adoption of Shared Residence in the vast majority of cases. This is clear from Section 36 on page 21.

=== Green Paper 2004 ===
In July 2004 the United Kingdom Government published a Green Paper in response to the two-year-old Making Contact Work document, and the more recent Child Contact Survey. Only the year before, the Government had been indicating that no legislative changes in this area were planned, so this is a turnaround whose timing is generally felt to be the result of the efforts of fathers' rights activists. The Women's Aid response to this paper contains the following: We believe that legislation is still required to create a rebuttable presumption in family proceedings legislation that child contact is not awarded unless and until it can be shown to be safe, and that this should be done through a mandatory risk assessment process. The response does not make clear whether this provision is intended to apply to both parents involved in a child residence dispute.

=== Party politics ===
At the same time, the Conservative Party has started indicating that it believes fundamental changes in the law are required. The Labour Party supports the stance taken by CAFCASS's trade union NAPO. The Opposition stance is that such a policy is against the existing Children Act.

The Liberal Democrats, the third major United Kingdom political party, has framed the issue in terms of domestic violence, but yet has to communicate its ideas widely.

== Constitutional Affairs Committee ==
The government in 2004 set up a select committee to look into Family Law in the United Kingdom. In relation to the way in which the fathers' rights campaign has been received, the following interchange took place during the taking of oral evidence on Family Justice: The Operation of The Family Courts at the House of Commons on Tuesday 9 November 2004.

Lord Justice Wall: A few years ago I went to address the annual general meeting of Families Need Fathers and I was actually very impressed by the strength of their feelings and their emotions. The message I gave them – and I was not the only one doing it – was that the way to succeed, the way to get into the system, is not to sloganise but actually to get on the committees, get in with government where there is lots going on and people want to consult you, and respond to Making Contact Work. We had an excellent response from Families Need Fathers, part of which we incorporated, and I think Families Need Fathers has become a key player in the debate about on-going contact and joint residence. We make progress with rational argument; we do not make progress by sloganising.

Dame Elizabeth Butler-Sloss: I cannot meet Fathers4Justice because they are not being sensible. As long as they throw condoms with purple powder and send a double-decker bus with a loudspeaker outside my private house in the West Country there is no point in talking to them; they are not going to talk, they are going to tell me.

Those present included Rt Hon Dame Elizabeth Butler-Sloss DBE, Rt Hon Lord Justice Wall and Hon Mr Justice Munby, His Honour Judge Meston QC, District Judge Michael Walker and District Judge Nicholas Crichton.

== Family court statements ==
=== Futility experienced in family court ===
In April 2004, the Honourable Mr. Justice Munby of the Court of Appeal in the UK wrote:

"From the father’s perspective the last two years of the litigation have been an exercise in absolute futility. …

He is entitled to [feel let down]. … I can understand why he expresses that view. He has every right to express that view. In a sense it is shaming to have to say it, but I personally agree with his view. It is very, very disheartening. I am sorry there is nothing more I can do."

==== Family court on parental alienation and PAS ====
The legal system in the United Kingdom has seen argument about parental alienation and parental alienation syndrome as is illustrated by comments the following cases:

Lady Justice Hale (in Re K (Contact: Psychiatric Report) [1995] 2 FLR 432) stated:

It is my unhappy experience, borne out by other anecdotal evidence and confirmed by the Official Solicitor's department that there seems to be an increasing number of cases coming before the family courts where contact between a young child and the absent parent has become bedevilled by stubborn opposition to contact being shown by the child which may, or may not, be evidence of some implacable hostility on the part of the other parent for good reason or for no reason at all.

Since The Children Act requires that the views of the child need to be made known to the court, fathers' rights campaigners claim that the mother sometimes alienates a child against his or her father and that this then supports the mother's case in court to banish the father. Lady Elizabeth Butler-Sloss, President of the Family division, (the top United Kingdom family court judge) stated (in Re L, V, M, H (Contact: Domestic Violence) [2002] 2 FLR 334 at 351):

There is, of course, no doubt that some parents, particularly mothers, are responsible for alienating their children from their fathers without good reason and thereby creating this sometimes insoluble problem. That unhappy state of affairs, well known in family courts, is a long way from recognised syndrome requiring mental health professionals to play an expert role.

== Bob Geldof's involvement ==
Relatively recently, Bob Geldof, organiser of the Live Aid and the Live 8 projects, has become involved in the British fathers' rights movement. Geldof claims to be an iconoclast, calling his arguments rants which express his feelings towards British family law, as well as towards issues of a more personal matter.

Geldof, and others, argue that without substantial changes, the application of current British custody law will lead to a generation of feral children. Geldof has written:

The law must know it is contributing to the problem. It is creating vast wells of misery, massive discontent, an unstable society of feral children and reckless adolescents who have no understanding of authority or ultimate sanction, no knowledge of a man’s love and how it is different but equal to a woman’s, irresponsible mothers, drifting, hopeless fathers, problem and violent ill-educated sons and daughters, a disconnect from the extended family and society at large, vast swathes of cynicism and repeat pattern behaviour in subsequent adult relationships.

Fathers' rights campaigners question the assumption that it can ever be legitimate for the state to collude in disrupting a loving and natural relationship between a father and his children. Geldof has written on this subject:

I cannot even say the words. A huge emptiness would well in my stomach, a deep loathing for those who would deign to tell me they would ALLOW me ACCESS to my children – those I loved above all, those I created, those who gave meaning to everything I did, those that were the very best of us two and the absolute physical manifestation of our once blinding love. Who the fuck are they that they should ALLOW anything? REASONABLE CONTACT!!! Is the law mad? Am I a criminal? An ABSENT parent. A RESIDENT/NON-RESIDENT parent. This Lawspeak which you all speak so fluently, so unthinkingly, so hurtfully, must go.

== See also ==
- Masculism
- Men's rights
- Child custody
- Child support
  - Child Support Agency
- Children and Family Court Advisory and Support Service (CAFCASS)
- Declaration of the Rights of the Child including the right to family life.
- Domestic violence
- Family court
- Family law
- Parenting plan
- Paternity
- Shared parenting
- Shared residency in English law
- The Children Act
