= List of parenting issues affecting separated parents =

This list identifies a range of parenting issues that affecting separated and divorced parents, that is regarding their children:

- Child custody
  - Joint custody
- Child support through the Child Support Agency (UK or (Australia or local equivalent) or through a family court
- Contact (including Visitation)
  - Childrens centre
- Enforcement of court orders
- Housing issues
- Naming the child, change of surname
- Parenting plan
- Parental responsibility
- Passports
- Religious issues
- Reporting to third parties (NSPCC, Social Services, etc.)
- Schools and medical issues
- Residence in English law
- Residence versus Contact
- Shared parenting and shared residency in English law

== Critical issues ==
- Child abduction
- Child abuse
- Legitimacy
- Parental alienation
- Paternity

== See also ==
- CAFCASS
- Divorce and related conflict
- Family law and Family court
- Fathers' rights
- Marriage and related conflict
