= Child contact centre =

A contact centre is a neutral place where children of separated families can enjoy contact with their non-resident parents and sometimes other family members, in a comfortable and safe environment. Child contact services are classified into two distinct categories: supported and supervised (which handle cases with safeguarding issues). Its primary role is to support and promote contact between those parents, grandparents, guardians and children that do not have a Residence Order (non-resident parent).

Use of a contact centre may be ordered by a family court in cases where:

- contact is being resumed after a break and there are concerns raised by the resident parent.
- when there are allegations by either party of
  - domestic violence or spousal abuse
  - child abuse either; sexual abuse, emotional abuse or physical abuse
  - neglect
- where there is parental alienation present or where one of the parties involved in the dispute has an implacable hostility toward another.
- where this has been deemed necessary by a custody evaluator or child welfare officer for welfare reasons, for evaluation purposes or else as a result of an abuse of power.

== United Kingdom ==
The centres are local projects, run by a range of organisations, including community groups, charities, social enterprises, companies and local authorities. The first contact centre in England opened in 1985 and the first centres in Scotland opened in 1988.

The National Association of Child Contact Centres is the supporting membership body for around 350 child contact centres and services located throughout England (including the Channel Isles), Wales and Northern Ireland. It is the largest in Europe. The majority of centres in Scotland are run by Relationships Scotland]. A Nottingham magistrate, Mary Lower, founded the first child contact centre for private law in 1985. She went on to form the National Association in 1991, continued her involvement as president until she died in 2017. Sir James Munby is now NACCC's president supported by two Vice Presidents (Baroness McIntosh of Pickering and Sir Mark Hedley) and Patron – Sir Andrew McFarlane (President of the Family Division and Head of Family Justice). Now an established charity and company limited by guarantee, NACCC has a board of trustees chaired by Hazel Hedley. The staff team are led by the Chief Executive, Elizabeth Coe.

Families either apply direct to go to a child contact centre direct or are referred by family solicitors, family mediators, social workers or CAFCASS officers.

== Australia ==
Children's Contact Services (CCS) are funded under the Australian Government's "Family Relationship Services Program" (FRSP). The services help with handover of children and also provide supervised contact.

As of 1 February 2004 there were 35 FRSP-funded Children's Contact Services and a number of non-Australian Government funded services. There is increasing difficulty in this sector, where government supported Child Contact Centres are subject to increasing demand and long wait lists, where private services are increasingly being offered in an unregulated industry.

== Israel ==
In Israel there are the largest number of contact centers per capita in the world, 84 for a population of 8 million. There are no contact centers in the non-Jewish areas. 2500 men are sent to contact centers every year, approximately 40% of all divorces.

== See also ==
- Child custody
- Supervised visitation
- Fathers' rights
- Parenting plan
- Relationships Australia
- Residence in English law
- Shared parenting
- Shared residency in English law
