= Both Parents Matter =

English social care organisation

- Abbreviation: BPM
- Founded: 1974; 52 years ago
- Founders: Alick Elithorn; Keith Parkin
- Type: NGO
- Headquarters: London, England
- Board Chair: Frances Carr
- CEO: Sam Morfey
- Website: bothparentsmatter.org.uk
- Formerly called: Families Need Fathers

Both Parents Matter is a UK social care charity that advocates for shared parenting and more gender equal custody laws. Founded in 1974, the organisation provides support, advice, and helpline services to parents and family members seeking to maintain parental relationship with their children following divorce or separation.

== Mission and work ==
In the United Kingdom, roughly one-third of children of separated parents have no contact with their father, and the organisation is primarily concerned with maintaining a child's relationship with both parents during and after family breakdown.

The majority of the charity's work consists of providing support, guidance, and assistance to parents and other close family members hoping to stay in touch with their children following divorce or separation, or who have been alienated or estranged from their children. The organisation researches the impact on children who lack contact with a parent, and works to raise awareness of these issues among the public, professionals and policymakers.

The organisation also advocates for shared parenting, whereby the children spend more equal or near-equal time with both parents following divorce or separation. It argues that scientific research suggests that shared parenting is in the best interests of children and beneficial for both parents. It also advocates for more time for children with their non-residual parent, and stronger protections when a resident parent defies court orders requiring them to allow their children a relationship with the other parent.

== History and organisation ==
Both Parents Matter was founded in May 1974 as Families Need Fathers by child psychiatrist Alick Elithorn and financial consultant Keith Parkin as an organisation to campaign for equal parenting time after divorce, and for increased contact between a child and its non-custodial parent. The organisation became a registered charity in 1979, and was able to hire staff in 1992. As the organisation grew in the 1990s, previous employees founded several new organisations with similar missions, such as Parents Forever Scotland, the Association of Shared Parenting, Dads After Divorce, and Fathers 4 Justice. In 1994, the Cheltenham Group was formed by Families Need Fathers, Dads After Divorce and Parents Forever Scotland in an attempt to form a coalition of shared parenting organisations.

In 2008, Families Need Fathers launched projects under the slogan Both Parents Matter and this strapline was added to the charity's logo in 2013. By 2010, the organisation had 51 branches across the United Kingdom and a network of 300 volunteers. It has since continued to advocate for shared parenting in the media, the House of Commons and the family justice establishment, while continuing its work as a social care organisation.

In 2009 guidance produced by the organisation came under criticism for giving the impression that it might have emanated from, or were approved by, the Department for Children, Schools and Families or Cafcass.

On October 12th, 2024, the members of Families Need Fathers voted 91% in favour of the Special Resolution to change the charity's name to Both Parents Matter.

== See also ==
- Shared parenting
- Parental alienation
- Shared residency in England
- Fathers' rights movement in the United Kingdom
- English family law
- Family court
