= The Licktators =

British ice cream company

The Licktators was an ice cream manufacturing company in London, England that has been described by the department store Selfridges as "more Sid and Nancy than Ben & Jerry".

== Foundation ==
Licktators was founded by activist Matt O’Connor, founder of Fathers 4 Justice and formerly of The Icecreamists. He uses unusual flavours and textures to create his ice creams such as donated breast milk, bread, roses and absinthe. The company once served a three-course Sundae Lunch which featured pea, beef and horseradish flavours. The company gained notoriety in 2011 for its "Baby Gaga" breast milk ice cream, which is made with donated breast milk. In 2015 Licktators collaborated with the band Blur to create an ice cream flavour based on their album, The Magic Whip.

The breast milk ice cream was launched in 2011 with the help of Victoria Hiley, a breastfeeding mother and advocate who answered an ad asking for breastmilk posted on Mumsnet, an online mothers' group. She donated 850 ml of breast milk which helped make the first 50 servings of ice cream. It was relaunched as "Royal Baby Gaga" in 2015 in celebration of the birth of Princess Charlotte and to remind the Duchess of Cambridge and mothers around the UK of the benefits of breastfeeding.

Founder Matt O'Connor has been involved with ice cream for over 20 years. As a designer, he helped launch Vienneta and Magnum, and designed the packaging for Loseley ice cream. He studied flavour theory in Italy at Bologna's Carigiani Gelato University. He works with Mark Broadbent, his chef and Alex Kammerling, a mixologist for Grey Goose.

== Legal troubles ==
In 2009, Licktators was threatened with legal action by the Sex Pistols after the debut of "God Save the Cream" (a take-off of the 1977 Sex Pistols song, God Save the Queen) which contained a herbal Viagra-type ingredient. In March 2011, The Icecreamists ice cream parlour was ordered to stop selling the "Baby Gaga" breast milk ice cream by Westminster Council. After two complaints from members of the public and apprehension about the product on the part of the Health Protection Agency and Food Standards Agency, officials confiscated all ice cream that contained breast milk so that it could undergo testing for potential communicable pathogens contained in bodily fluids. O’Connor, however, insisted that the breast milk was screened and tested using the same processes that blood donor centres and breast milk banks use. The health protection agency ultimately permitted sale for human consumption.

In 2015, Lady Gaga threatened to sue O’Connor for the use of her name in association with the "Baby Gaga" ice cream, claiming that he had used her name without consent. At that time it was renamed "Royal Baby Gaga" to commemorate the birth of Princess Charlotte, daughter of the then Prince and Princess of Wales. It was distributed in blue and pink tubs and showed the Duchess holding a baby, accompanied by a pink and blue British flag. He claimed the name was a reference to the sound that babies make.
