= Jim Parton =

British activist and author

Jim Parton (born in Nairobi in 1959) is the author of several books, including Unreasonable Behaviour, The Bucks Stops Here and Playing Footsie. He also wrote a book with the popular minstrel Robbie Williams, entitled Let Me Entertain You.

He used to be a fathers' rights activist and was chairman of the charitable social care organization Families Need Fathers (FNF) for five years and later editor of the charity's newsletter, McKenzie. Parton was a frequent spokesperson on family law issues in the UK media.

He now lives in southern Poland, where he is restoring a seventeenth-century former bishop's palace with his wife at Piotrowice Nyskie, near Nysa. He writes occasionally on the internet and for the press and is a member of the Dull Men's Club.
