= Shared residency in England =

Type of parental custody arrangement

Shared residence, joint residence, or shared parenting refers to the situation where a child of parents who have divorced or separated live with each parent at different times, such as every other week. With shared residency, both parents have parental responsibility. Shared residency does not mean that the time the child spends with each parent must be equal.

== Rationale ==
Shared residency is an option when both parents want to be fully involved in their children's upbringing, when either or both parents consent to the order, and when the Court certifies that the Order as being in the best interests of the child. Compared to children in sole residency that live with only one of their parents, scientific research has shown that children with a shared residency arrangement have better physical health (e.g. sleep, physical activity, smoking, alcohol use), higher psychological wellbeing (e.g. self-perception, life satisfaction, anxiety, depression), fewer behavioural problems (e.g. delinquency, school misbehaviour, bullying) and stronger social relationships (with friends, parents, step-parents and grandparents).

== Frequency ==
Shared residence is relatively uncommon in the United Kingdom. Among children not living in an intact family with both their mother and father, a 2005/06 survey found that only 7% had a shared residence arrangement while 83% lived only with their mother and 10% lived only with their father.

== Legal statutes and cases ==
The Children Act 1989 defines a residence order as one "...settling the arrangements to be made as to the person with whom a child is to live". A sole residence order settles the child(ren) in the home of one parent. The other parent will usually be allowed contact. A joint or shared residence order allows the child(ren) to alternate periods of residence between the homes of both parents.

The Children Act 1989 Guidance and Regulations, Volume 1, Court Orders produced by the President of the Family Division (the leading judge of the Family Court, Dame Elizabeth Butler-Sloss) and published by the Stationery Office in 1991 discussed shared orders in paragraph 2.2(8) at page 10: -

...it is not expected that it would become a common form of order, partly because most children will still need the stability of a single home, and partly because in the cases where shared care is appropriate there is less likely to be a need for the court to make any order at all. However, a shared care order has the advantage of being more realistic in those cases where the child is to spend considerable amount of time with both parents, brings with it certain other benefits (including the right to remove the child from accommodation provided by a local authority under s.20), and removes any impression that one parent is good and responsible whereas the other parent is not.

This was the approach in D v D (Shared Residence Order) (2001) 1 FLR 495 , in which it was held that residence of the children involved could be shared, even when one of the parents was hostile to the idea. The principle was clearly stated: it is not necessary to show that exceptional circumstances exist before a shared residence order may be granted. Nor is it probably necessary to show a positive benefit to the child. What is required is to demonstrate that the order is in the interest of the child in accordance with the requirements of s1 Children Act 1989 which makes the interests of the children the first and paramount concern of the Courts in any litigation. In the case of very young children, there is an informal rebuttable presumption in disputed cases that a very young child's interests are more likely to be served by having a single 'base' with one parent, regardless of how the other has performed. This may be rebutted by evidence to demonstrate that the child's interests will be better served by shared residence, or by sole residence with one spouse or with other significant persons. Recently, Baroness Morris of Bolton commented:

If a parent is considered a fit parent when they are married or living together, there is no reason in a normal case why that assumption should change just because they separate or divorce. They should not have to prove that they are able to care for their children by being subject to reversal of the burden of proof that the current system operates. That in no way undermines the presumption that the welfare of the child is a paramount concern; it supports it.

The issue of hostility was addressed in Re M (Intractable Contact Dispute: Interim Care Order) (2003) 2 FLR 636, which provides for the making of an order under s37 Children Act 1989 inviting the local authority to investigate and report. Wall J. found that the mother had caused the children to believe that they had suffered abuse at the hands of the father and paternal grandparents, and that an assessment was needed when the children were not at home with the mother. This was secured away from the home under an interim care order. Free from the mother's influence, the children were rapidly able to re-establish their relationship with the father. Subsequently, an Order was made that they reside with him. Although this approach is not appropriate in all cases involving disputing parents, it is a useful tool to have available. If it is clear that contact is desirable but one parent obstructs it, the risk of significant harm may be present. The judge must prepare a coherent care plan, identifying the reasons for making a Section 37 Order, and stating the consequences of the Order and possible removal. In these proceedings, it is essential that the children are separately represented and that there the same judge is allocated to deal with all aspects arising from the proceedings.

In Family Law, each case is held to be unique on its facts, but the usual process of the interpretation of the law being based on precedents applies. Hence, since D v D, there have been a number of cases where shared residence has been awarded to children in spite of one parent's initial objections or continuing hostility including:

- Re A (Children) (Shared Residence) (2002) 1 FCR 177, where a sole order was varied by consent to a joint order in part, because a joint residence order confirms both spouses on an equal authority vis-à-vis the world. That might have practical implications, particularly, for instance, in relation to the Child Benefit Agency and to the drawing of child benefit which would have been drawn by one spouse alone. This acknowledgement of the equal competence of the parents, also buttresses the spouse's sense of well-being and of self-esteem as parents.
- Re F (Shared Residence Order) (2003) 2 FLR 397 records a well-balanced decision for a joint order by the judge of first instance made the subject of an appeal by an unhappy spouse. The appeal was withdrawn in the face of the comments of the Court of Appeal demonstrating the fairness of the joint order.
- A Father and A Mother v Their Two Children (B and C) (2004) EWHC 142 (FAM) in which a bitter contest was finally resolved by a joint order.

== See also ==
- Child custody
- Childrens centre
- Fathers' rights
- List of parenting issues affecting separated parents
- Parental responsibility (access and custody)
- Parenting plan
- Shared parenting
