= Primary carer =

Parent who has most parenting time with children after a separation

Primary parent or primary carer is the parent who has most parenting time with the children after separation. The other parent is then known as the secondary parent – arguably less pejorative than terms like single parent (when in fact there are two parents) or parent with care.

The term primary parent is also used colloquially to refer to the person who is principally looking after a child at a given point in time, regardless of parental relationship status.

== United Kingdom ==
The primary carer or parent is overwhelmingly the mother in the UK, with around 90% of primary carers being mothers.

In the UK, the status of primary carer is crucial as there is an effective winner takes all (benefits) system, whereby 100% of the rewards for being a parent go the primary carer, normally the mother, and none to the secondary carer, normally the father.

Organisations such as Families Need Fathers say this is not in the children's best interests and are campaigning to try to remove this alleged indirect discrimination and prejudice in calling for a presumption of shared parenting and equal separation of parenting time after separation, as happens with financial matters following a divorce.
