= Gabriel Aubry =

Canadian model (born 1976)

- Born: Gabriel Eugène Aubry; August 30, 1975 (age 51); Montreal, Quebec, Canada
- Occupation: Model
- Partner: Halle Berry (2005–2010)
- Children: 1
- Modeling information
- Height: 1.88 m (6 ft 2 in)
- Hair color: Blond
- Eye color: Green
- Agencies: Wilhelmina Models; Beatrice Models

Gabriel Eugène Aubry (born August 30, 1975) is a Canadian model.

== Early life ==
Born in Montreal, Quebec, to French-Canadian parents, Aubry is one of nine siblings.

== Modeling career ==
He has modeled for Tommy Hilfiger, Gianni Versace, Calvin Klein, DKNY, Valentino, Trussardi, Nautica, Exte, Joop, Massimo Dutti and Next. He is signed to Wilhelmina Models in New York City, and to Beatrice Models in Milan, Italy.

He appeared in a Macy's commercial in early 2008 as part of an exclusivity deal with Calvin Klein alongside Mariah Carey, Martha Stewart, Donald Trump and Carlos Santana. He was the only male model ever to appear on the cover of L'Uomo Vogue while appearing in four different designers' campaigns simultaneously in the same magazine. He has been listed on People Magazine's "Most Beautiful People List". In 2012, he was one of the top-earning male models in the modeling industry.

== Personal life ==
Aubry began dating American actress Halle Berry in November 2005. The couple met at a Versace photoshoot. Berry gave birth to the couple's daughter in March 2008. On April 30, 2010, Aubry and Berry announced their relationship had ended some months earlier.

After their separation, Aubry and Berry became involved in a highly publicized custody battle, centered primarily on Berry's desire to move with their daughter from Los Angeles to France, the native country of Berry's then-fiancé, actor Olivier Martinez. Aubry objected to the move on the grounds that it would interfere with Aubry and Berry's joint custody arrangement.

In November 2012, a judge denied Berry's request to move her daughter to France in light of Aubry's objections—despite the custody evaluator's opinion, which favored Berry. Martinez performed a citizen's arrest on Aubry, and was granted an emergency protective order preventing Aubry from coming within 100 yards of Berry and their daughter, and Martinez, until November 26, 2012. In turn, Aubry obtained a restraining order against Martinez on November 26, 2012, asserting that the fight began when Martinez threatened to kill Aubry if he did not allow the couple to move to France.

On November 29, 2012, Berry's lawyer announced that Berry and Aubry had reached an amicable custody agreement in court.

In June 2014, a Superior Court ruling called for Berry to pay Aubry $16,000 a month in child support as well as a retroactive payment of $115,000 and a sum of $300,000 for Aubry's attorney fees.

Aubry owned a restaurant called Cafe Fuego, located in the East Village of Manhattan. In 2008, he released an album Cafe Fuego Vol. 1, which he produced. He plays guitar on some of the tracks. The album was created to reflect the ambiance of the restaurant and has been described as "a delicate fusion of soulful sounds, highlighted with a world music flair, bossa-nova grooves and inspired by Latin and Cuban roots."
