= Peterwitz =

Peterwitz is the German name of several Polish villages in the region of Silesia:

- Piotrowice Nyskie, a village in the administrative district of Gmina Otmuchów (German: Gemeinde Ottmachau), within Nysa County, Opole Voivodeship, in south-western Poland, close to the Czech border
- Stoszowice, a village in Ząbkowice County, Lower Silesian Voivodeship, in south-western Poland. It is the seat of the administrative district (gmina) called Gmina Stoszowice.
- Pietrowice, Opole Voivodeship, another village in Poland whose name in German is "Peterwitz"
