= Michigan Circuit Courts =

Circuit courts are the trial courts with the broadest powers in Michigan. In Michigan, circuit courts handle all felony criminal cases that could result in confinement to prison. They also deal with all civil cases for claims in excess of $25,000.00. There are 57 circuit courts in the state of Michigan. Judges are elected for six-year terms. In Michigan, circuit courts are divided into two divisions: general division and family division.

== Organization ==
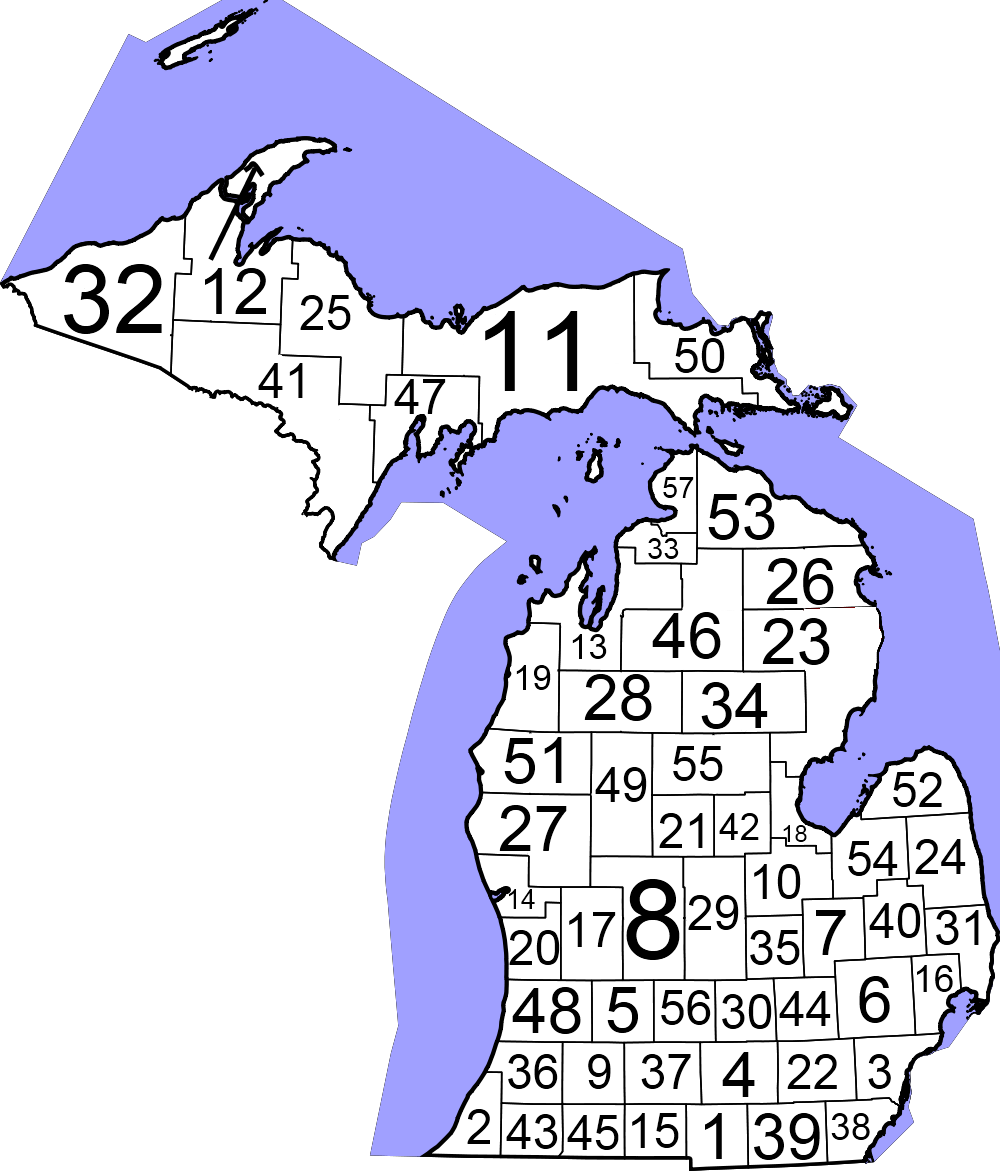

As of 2023, there are 57 judicial circuits that are set by the legislature. The number of judges in each circuit is set by the legislature. Since Michigan has 83 counties, some circuit courts cover several counties; judges elected in multi-county circuits must travel from one county to another to hold court.

To be eligible to be elected as a circuit court judge in Michigan, the person must be a qualified elector, a resident of the judicial circuit, a member of the Michigan Bar in good standing, and under the age of 70 years old.

=== Family Division ===
The family division of the circuit court has exclusive jurisdiction over all family matters in the circuit, including adoptions, child support, custody, divorce, juvenile proceedings, name changes, parenting time, paternity, and personal protection orders.

=== Business Courts ===
By statute, Michigan established business court dockets within all circuit courts having three or more judges. The statute lists case types of a business or commercial nature that fall within the business court's jurisdiction, as well as case types falling outside the business court's jurisdiction. There are currently 17 circuit courts with business court dockets, each of which is required to have a local administrative order addressing procedures in its business court. The business court judges in these circuits have issued hundreds of written opinions since the business court's inception. The Michigan judicial institute is required to provide training to the business court judges. The Michigan Bar Journal has a regular column addressing developments and practice in Michigan's business courts, Touring the Business Courts.

== History ==
In 1833, all the county courts in all counties in the territory of Michigan except Wayne were abolished and replaced by one circuit court of the territory of Michigan. In 1836, the state was divided into 3 circuits. The 1850 Michigan Constitution made the office of circuit court judges elected officials and set the term of office to six (6) years.

In 1908, the Constitution provided for judicial circuits which are drawn around county lines.

== List ==
=== List of Circuit Courts ===
Court	County	Number of Judges	Courthouse location(s)	Image	Source
1st Circuit	Hillsdale	1			Court Website
2nd Circuit	Berrien	13			
3rd Circuit	Wayne	61			
4th Circuit	Jackson	4			
5th Circuit	Barry	2			
6th Circuit	Oakland	18			
7th Circuit	Genesee	9			
8th Circuit	Montcalm and Ionia	2			
9th Circuit	Kalamazoo	5			
10th Circuit	Saginaw	5			
11th Circuit	Luce, Mackinac, Schoolcraft, and Alger	1			
12th Circuit	Houghton, Baraga and Keweenaw	1			
13th Circuit	Leelanau, Antrim and Grand Traverse	2			
14th Circuit	Muskegon	4			
15th Circuit	Branch	2			
16th Circuit	Macomb	12			
17th Circuit	Kent	10			
18th Circuit	Bay	3			
19th Circuit	Benzie, Manistee	1			
20th Circuit	Ottawa	4			
21st Circuit	Isabella	2			
22nd Circuit	Washtenaw	5			
23rd Circuit	Iosco, Arenac, Alcona, Oscoda	3			
24th Circuit	Sanilac	1			
25th Circuit	Marquette	2			
26th Circuit	Alpena, Montmorency	1			
27th Circuit	Oceana, Newaygo	2			
28th Circuit	Wexford, Missaukee	1			
29th Circuit	Gratiot, Clinton	2			
30th Circuit	Ingham	7			
31st Circuit	St. Clair	3			
32nd Circuit	Ontonagon, Gogebic	2			
33rd Circuit	Charlevoix	1			
34th Circuit	Ogemaw, Roscommon	1			
35th Circuit	Shiawassee	1			
36th Circuit	Van Buren	3			
37th Circuit	Calhoun	4			
38th Circuit	Monroe	3			
39th Circuit	Lenawee	2			
40th Circuit	Lapeer	2			
41st Circuit	Iron, Dickinson, Menominee	3			
42nd Circuit	Midland	2			
43rd Circuit	Cass	1			
44th Circuit	Livingston	2			
45th Circuit	St. Joseph	1			
46th Circuit	Otsego, Crawford, Kalkaska	2			
47th Circuit	Delta	1			
48th Circuit	Allegan	2			
49th Circuit	Osceola, Mecosta	2			
50th Circuit	Chippewa	1			
51st Circuit	Mason, Lake	3			
52nd Circuit	Huron	1			
53rd Circuit	Cheboygan, Presque Isle	1			
54th Circuit	Tuscola	1			
55th Circuit	Clare, Gladwin	2			
56th Circuit	Eaton	3			
57th Circuit	Emmet	1			
