= Martin Guggenheim =

Martin Guggenheim (born May 29, 1946) is an American legal scholar, attorney, and clinical professor whose work focuses on contemporary practice and policy in child welfare, parental rights, and juvenile justice.He is Fiorello LaGuardia Professor of Clinical Law Emeritus at New York University School of Law.

He has litigated parental-rights cases before the U.S. Supreme Court, authored scholarship including the 1995 article that coined the term legal orphan.

== Early life and education ==
Guggenheim was born and raised in New York. He earned a B.A. from the State University of New York at Buffalo in 1968 and a J.D. from New York University School of Law in 1971.

== Career ==
Guggenheim began his legal career as a trial attorney in the Juvenile Rights Division of the Legal Aid Society in New York in 1971, where he worked on systemic litigation involving juvenile justice and child welfare. In the mid-1970s he joined the American Civil Liberties Union’s Juvenile Rights Project, first as Acting Director and later as Staff Counsel, and during this period he served as chief or counsel in Supreme Court cases addressing constitutional protections in child-welfare and juvenile procedures.

Cases among these are Santosky v. Kramer (455 U.S. 745, 1982), in which the Court adopted the “standard for terminating parental rights; Lehman v. Lycoming County Children’s Services Agency (458 U.S. 502, 1982) on federal habeas review in termination cases; and Schall v. Martin (467 U.S. 253, 1984), which considered preventive detention of juveniles.

Guggenheim joined the NYU School of Law faculty in 1973 as Clinical Professor of Law, was appointed Fiorello LaGuardia Professor of Clinical Law in 2006, and retired as Professor Emeritus in 2022. He served as Director of Clinical and Advocacy Programs from 1987 to 2002, Executive Director of Washington Square Legal Services from 1987 to 2000, and Acting Director of the Hays Civil Liberties Program.

In 1990 Guggenheim founded the Family Defense Clinic at NYU Law, the first law-school clinic in the United States devoted to representing parents in child-welfare proceedings.

== Scholarship ==
Guggenheim has authored books, policy reports, and articles on child welfare, parental rights, and juvenile justice. In a widely cited 1995 article he introduced and defined the concept of the legal orphan to describe children who have been severed legally from living parents by court action; the term foregrounded how some children can become parentless in law despite the survival and ongoing care-willingness of their biological parents.

Guggenheim’s scholarship and practice have proceed the argument that inadequate legal representation and agency procedures disproportionately harm low-income, Black, Indigenous, and other marginalized families. He led empirical and policy research on interdisciplinary legal representation (ILOs) in New York City; a 2014 study he directed, published in Children and Youth Services Review, reported that integrated legal teams for parents reduced average foster-care stays without compromising child safety and projected substantial fiscal savings for city systems.

== Awards and honors ==
- The Podell Distinguished Teaching Award, New York University School of Law (2015)
- The Champion of Justice Award, ABA Center on Children and the Law (2013);
- The Livingston Hall Award, American Bar Association (2006)
- Annual Katheryn D. Katz ’70 Memorial Lecture, Albany Law School (2024)
- The Howard Levine Award, New York State Bar Association (2023)

== Selected publications ==
=== Books ===
- GUGGENHEIM, Martin (2005-01-01). What's Wrong with Children's Rights. Harvard University Press. doi:10.4159/9780674038028. ISBN 978-0-674-03802-8.
- "Representing Parents in Child Welfare Cases: Advice and Guidance for Family Defenders". www.americanbar.org.
- Guggenheim, Martin; Sussman, Alan (1985). The rights of young people. An American Civil Liberties Union handbook. Toronto ; New York: Bantam Books. ISBN 978-0-553-24818-0.
- Hertz, Randy; Guggenheim, Martin; Amsterdam, Anthony G. (2014). Trial Manual for Defense Attorneys in Juvenile Delinquency Cases. American Bar Association, Section of Criminal Justice. ISBN 978-1-62722-660-8.
- Guggenheim, Martin; Lowe, Alexandra Dylan; Curtis, Diane (1996). The rights of families: the authoritative ACLU guide to the rights of family members today. An American Civil Liberties Union handbook. American Civil Liberties Union. Carbondale: Southern Illinois University Press. ISBN 978-0-8093-2051-6.
- Hertz, Randy; Guggenheim, Martin; Amsterdam, Anthony G. (2008). Trial Manual for Defense Attorneys in Juvenile Court. ALI-ABA. ISBN 978-0-8318-0008-6.

=== Journals articles ===
- Guggenheim, Martin (2025). "The American Law Institute has raised the profile of the family regulation system". Family Court Review. 63 (3): 459–466. doi:10.1111/fcre.70005. ISSN 1531-2445.
- Guggenheim, Martin (2021-07-01). "How Racial Politics Led Directly to the Enactment of the Adoption and Safe Families Act of 1997". Columbia Journal of Race and Law. 11 (3). doi:10.52214/cjrl.v11i3.8749. ISSN 2155-2401.
- Guggenheim, Martin (2021-12-15). "Fulton v. City of Philadelphia: How no one paid any attention to children's rights". Family Court Review. 60 (1): 23–31. doi:10.1111/fcre.12624. ISSN 1531-2445.
- Guggenheim, Martin (2021-07-01). "How Racial Politics Led Directly to the Enactment of the Adoption and Safe Families Act of 1997". Columbia Journal of Race and Law. 11 (3). doi:10.52214/cjrl.v11i3.8749. ISSN 2155-2401.
- Guggenheim, Martin (2020). "How Family Defender Offices in New York City Are Able to Safely Reduce the Time Children Spend in Foster Care". Family Law Quarterly. 54 (1/2): 1–36. ISSN 0014-729X. JSTOR 27007872.
- Gerber, Lucas A.; Pang, Yuk C.; Ross, Timothy; Guggenheim, Martin; Pecora, Peter J.; Miller, Joel (2019). "Effects of an interdisciplinary approach to parental representation in child welfare". Children and Youth Services Review. 102: 42–55. doi:10.1016/j.childyouth.2019.04.022. ISSN 0190-7409.
- Gerber, Lucas A.; Pang, Yuk C.; Ross, Timothy; Guggenheim, Martin; Pecora, Peter J.; Miller, Joel (July 2019). "Effects of an interdisciplinary approach to parental representation in child welfare". Children and Youth Services Review. 102: 42–55. doi:10.1016/j.childyouth.2019.04.022. ISSN 0190-7409.
- Guggenheim, Martin (2019). "How Clinical Scholarship Impacted the Family Defense Clinic". SSRN Electronic Journal. doi:10.2139/ssrn.3470150. ISSN 1556-5068.
