= Santosky v. Kramer =

- Supreme Court of the United States

Argued November 10, 1981 Decided March 24, 1982
- Full case name: John Santosky, et al. v. Bernhardt S. Kramer, Commissioner, Ulster County Department of Social Services, et al.
- Docket no.: 80-5889
- Citations: 455 U.S. 745 (more) 102 S. Ct. 1388; 71 L. Ed. 2d 599

Case history
- Prior: Matter of John AA, 75 A.D.2d 910, 427 N.Y.S.2d 319 (App. Div., 3d Dept. 1980); cert. granted, 450 U.S. 993 (1981).

Holding
- New York State's standard of fair preponderance of the evidence for the termination of parental rights violates the Due Process Clause of the Fourteenth Amendment due to the standard being too low for such a severe action. Before revoking parental rights, the State must satisfy a burden of at least clear and convincing evidence. Holding of the lower court reversed.

Court membership
- Chief Justice Warren E. Burger Associate Justices William J. Brennan Jr. · Byron White; Thurgood Marshall · Harry Blackmun; Lewis F. Powell Jr. · William Rehnquist; John P. Stevens · Sandra Day O'Connor

Case opinions
- Majority: Blackmun, joined by Brennan, Marshall, Powell, Stevens
- Dissent: Rehnquist, joined by Burger, White, O'Connor

Santosky v. Kramer, 455 U.S. 745 (1982), is a Supreme Court case involving the burden of proof for the revocation of parental rights. The case arose when the Ulster County, New York, Department of Social Services sought to revoke John Santosky II and Annie Santosky's parental rights to their three children. Under Section 622 of the New York State Family Court Act, the state was permitted to revoke parental rights to a natural child if, after a fair preponderance of the evidence, a court found "permanent neglect". The New York State Family Court found such neglect by using the "fair preponderance" standard. The Appellate Division of the New York Supreme Court upheld the constitutionality of the burden of proof used.

In a 5–4 opinion written by Associate Justice Harry Blackmun, the Supreme Court of the United States reversed and vacated the Appellate Division's ruling, holding that states seeking to sever parental rights irrevocably must show at least clear and convincing evidence of neglect. Justice William Rehnquist, joined by three others, dissented, on the grounds that the majority's focus on a single aspect of the law disregarded the fairness of the scheme as a whole.

== Background ==
=== Due Process and the 14th Amendment ===
The Supreme Court has previously held that citizens have certain fundamental rights upon which the government cannot infringe, unless the deprivation of that right is necessary to achieve a compelling government interest. This doctrine, arising from the "liberty clause" of the Fourteenth Amendment, is known as substantive due process. The right to privacy was found to be fundamental under this doctrine, and a number of rights to choice came out of it, such as in Roe v. Wade, where the Court found a right to have an abortion and in Meyer v. Nebraska, where the court found a parental right to raise their children as they wish. In Griswold v. Connecticut the Court extended this doctrine to the right to procure contraception. Substantive due process was further expanded to encompass children with In re Gault establishing that children have a right to procedural due process when the state attempts to take custody of them.

Procedural due process, arising from the Fifth and Fourteenth Amendments, is minimally the right to notice and a hearing, but has been held to include in some circumstances rights to counsel and rights to confrontation. Procedural due process is required any time a person faces the deprivation of life, liberty, or property. As substantive due process arises from the liberty clause, a deprivation of a substantive due process right is a deprivation of liberty and thus requires procedural due process.

The deprivation of rights secured by substantive due process requires some amount of procedural due process, but procedural due process can range from an administrative hearing to a jury trial. In Mathews v. Eldridge, the Court explained the level of due process required for the termination of Social Security benefits and, in doing so, established a method for determining the level of procedural due process required in depriving a person of life, liberty, or property. The Court did so by balancing state interests against the procedural due process rights of an individual. The Mathews test takes into account three factors: "the private interests affected by the proceeding", "the risk of error created by the State's chosen procedure", and "the countervailing governmental interest supporting use of the challenged procedure."

=== Facts of the Case ===
The Ulster County Department of Social Services received reports from neighbors and physicians of Tina Santosky regarding her injuries: a broken femur, bruises, and cuts. Suspecting child abuse, Bernhardt S. Kramer, the Commissioner of the Ulster County Department of Social Services, initiated parental neglect proceedings and removed Tina Santosky from the custody of her parents, John and Annie Santosky, in November 1973. 10 months later, the Santoskys' second child, John II, was removed after he was found to be suffering from malnutrition. On that same day, Annie Santosky gave birth to Jed, the couple's third child. Three days after Jed's birth, he was removed from their custody and placed in a foster home.

About four years later, Kramer petitioned the Ulster County Family Court to revoke parental rights. Under section 622 of the New York State Family Court Act, Kramer was only required to satisfy a "fair preponderance of the evidence" burden and show that permanent neglect is more likely than not. The Santoskys challenged the constitutionality of this burden, but the Family Court rejected their challenge and found permanent neglect under the fair preponderance standard.

The Santoskys appealed, and the Appellate Division of the New York Supreme Court affirmed the ruling of the Family Court. Their next appeal to the New York Court of Appeals was dismissed as lacking a substantial constitutional question. The Santoskys appealed again, and the Supreme Court of the United States granted certiorari.

At oral argument, Martin Guggenheim argued for the petitioners that the burden of proof under New York law was unconstitutional, stating "[T]he Constitution requires that the finder of fact be reasonably convinced that the result of permanent destruction of the family is appropriate before the state may force such an irrevocable and fundamental deprivation of liberty on an individual." Respondents argued that raising the burden of proof would not have affected the outcome of the case, and that "if the Court should raise the burden, it would frustrate a specific intent of the legislature."

== Opinion of the Court ==
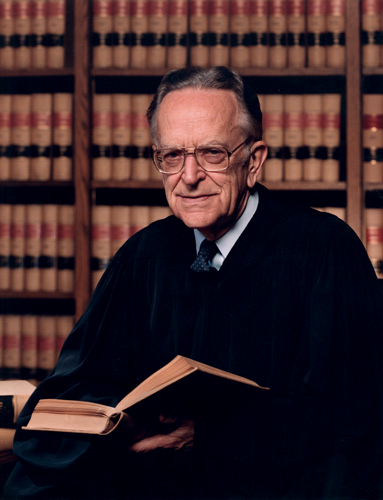
Justice Blackmun delivered the opinion of the Court

Writing for a majority of the Court, Justice Harry Blackmun held that natural parents have a right to due process under the Fourteenth Amendment, and that the burden of proof used by New York State was not stringent enough to satisfy the constitutional requirements of the Due Process Clause. In striking down New York's burden, the Court utilized the Mathews test to determine what burden of proof was due.

The Mathews test employed consists of three considerations: the private interests affected, the risk posed by erroneous judgement, and the government interest affected. The Court found that private interests were substantially affected by the law noting that "[w]hen the State initiates a parental rights termination proceeding, it seeks not merely to infringe that fundamental liberty interest, but to end it" and that such a termination was irreversible. In analyzing the second factor, the Court stated that the interests of the parents and the child in their natural relationship are not distinct and thus the balancing factors are between the parents and the State. The Court then found that the "fair preponderance" burden did not fairly allocate risk and that a higher burden would be practically and symbolically important. The Court found that while the State had an interest, a higher burden would have little impact on the ability for the State to achieve its goal. Following from this review, the Court held that "the State [must] support its allegations by at least clear and convincing evidence."

=== Dissenting opinion ===
The dissent, written by Justice Rehnquist, opposed the ruling of the Court on two main points: matters of family law should be left to the states, and that the Court's analysis was too narrow. While the dissent agreed with the Court's determination that parents have a due process right, they disagreed in the application of Mathews v. Eldridge. Quoting that case, the dissent clarified stating, "substantial weight must be given to the good faith judgments of the individuals [administering a program] ... that the procedures they have provided assure fair consideration of the ... claims of individuals." The dissent further argued that, by focusing narrowly on only the burden of proof in the statute, the majority failed to take into account the fairness of New York's scheme as a whole.

== Subsequent developments ==
By the early 1990s, all states previously using the "fair preponderance" standard had adapted to using the "clear and convincing" standard in termination proceedings. New York, among other states, did not apply the elevated burden of proof to the fact-finding phase of the proceedings, but rather only to the termination proceedings. The Colorado Supreme Court, conducting its own Mathews test, found that such a burden need not be applied to the fact-finding portion of the case. In the 1990s, California, a state that had previously used the clear and convincing standard, lowered its burden in termination proceedings. The constitutionality of this scheme was challenged and brought before the California Supreme Court in 1993. The court specifically rejected Santosky, citing substantial differences between California's procedures and New York's in Santosky, and upheld the constitutionality of the statute.

Seven years after the Santosky decision, the United States Supreme Court held in Price Waterhouse v. Hopkins that Santosky's higher burden of proof is an exception to the "conventional rules of civil litigation [...] that parties to civil litigation need only prove their case by a preponderance of the evidence." The Court later extended Santosky's finding of governmental interest in "preserving and promoting the welfare of the child" when it held in Reno v. Flores that children with no available guardians may be held in custody pending deportation hearings. In 2000, the right of parents to choose how to raise their child, one of the main constitutional interests at issue in Santosky, was affirmed in Troxel v. Granville when the Court struck down a Washington law that allowed for third parties to petition for visitation rights over parental objections. In his dissent, Justice John Paul Stevens rebutted the assumption of Santosky that interests of the parent and the interests of the child do not diverge, arguing that "the Due Process Clause of the Fourteenth Amendment leaves room for States to consider the impact on a child of possibly arbitrary parental decisions that neither serve nor are motivated by the best interests of the child."

== Impact ==
The Court made clear that the interests of children should be assumed to be covered as part of the interests of the parent, not treated as separate, but this doctrine has been less clear in practice as termination proceedings still focus on the fitness of the parent. This has resulted in further constitutional protections for parents and increasingly formal termination proceedings that limit the contribution of the child's interests in the proceedings. Santosky has also contributed to the role of parental rights of undocumented immigrants as the constitutionally protected parental rights may apply to non-citizens as well as United States citizens.

The ruling has been criticized for its intrusion into state affairs and its basis in previous rulings. Prior to Santosky, the realm of family life had been left to the states. Because of this, Santosky's direct intervention into the affairs of state interests was seen as contrary to United States v. Yazell, which held that federal courts should only overturn state statutes when those statutes cannot adequately serve a clear and substantial federal interest.

== See also ==
- Addington v. Texas
- In re Winship
