= Relationships Australia =

Relationship advisory service

Relationships Australia (RA) is an Australian not-for profit organisation providing professional services to support relationships across Australia that began in 1948 under the name of Marriage Guidance Council. Initially providing counselling services using volunteers, they now provide a range of professional relationship support services.

Relationships Australia is approved under the "Family Relationships Services Program", which is administered by the Australian Department of Families, Community Services and Indigenous Affairs to provide services including: family therapy, mediation, skills training and children's contact services. They also receive funding from Australian states and territories for services including: for people with a gambling problem, and their families, parenting skills, and family violence prevention.

Recently, Relationships Australia Victoria (RAV) has expanded their services to include online support and counselling, beginning with a pilot study among fathers who had lost daily contact with their children.
