= Parenting time =

Parenting time is the amount of time each parent spends with their children when parents separate. Disagreements about how to measure it and how to divide it often cause controversy between the parents.

== United Kingdom ==
For child maintenance purposes, for example, the Child Support Agency and their successor, the Child Maintenance and Enforcement Commission (CMEC) define parenting time in terms of the number of nights that the children stay with each parent. Thus the primary carer receives a reduced child maintenance calculation if the secondary carer has more than 52 nights/year contract with his children. This could be considered as unfair to those secondary carers who provide significant day-time care of the children but are unable to provide overnight accommodation owing to the unsuitability of their property.

Fathers' rights movement argue that this indirectly discriminates against fathers, as they are more likely to have moved out of the former matrimonial home and less able to obtain social housing suitable for the children to stay. This is part of the winner takes all (benefits) situation and arguably not in the children's best interests.

== External resources ==
- http://www.fnf.org.uk
- http://www.cmoptions.org/en/calculator/calculator.asp
- http://www.legalservices.gov.uk/civil/guidance/eligibility_calculator.asp
- opsi.gov.uk
