= Piotrowice Nyskie =

- Village
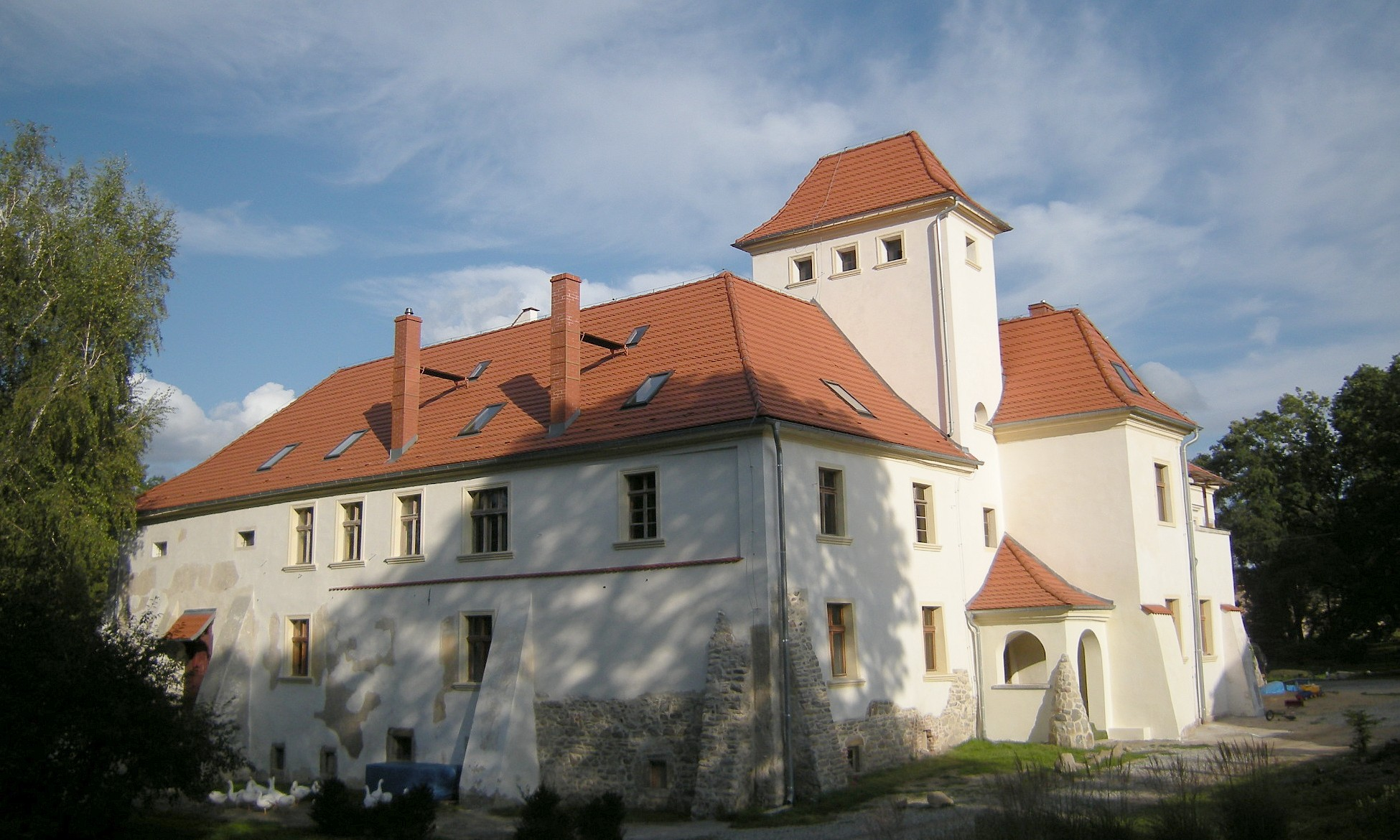

- Location within Poland
- Coordinates: 50°24′39″N 17°9′11″E
- Country: Poland
- Voivodeship: Opole
- County: Nysa
- Gmina: Otmuchów
- Elevation: 210 m (690 ft)
- Population (approx.): 300

Piotrowice Nyskie [pjɔtrɔˈvit͡sɛ ˈnɨskʲɛ] (German: Peterwitz) is a village in the administrative district of Gmina Otmuchów, within Nysa County, Opole Voivodeship, in south-western Poland, close to the Czech border.

The village has a seventeenth-century former bishop's palace which is currently being restored by the author Jim Parton.

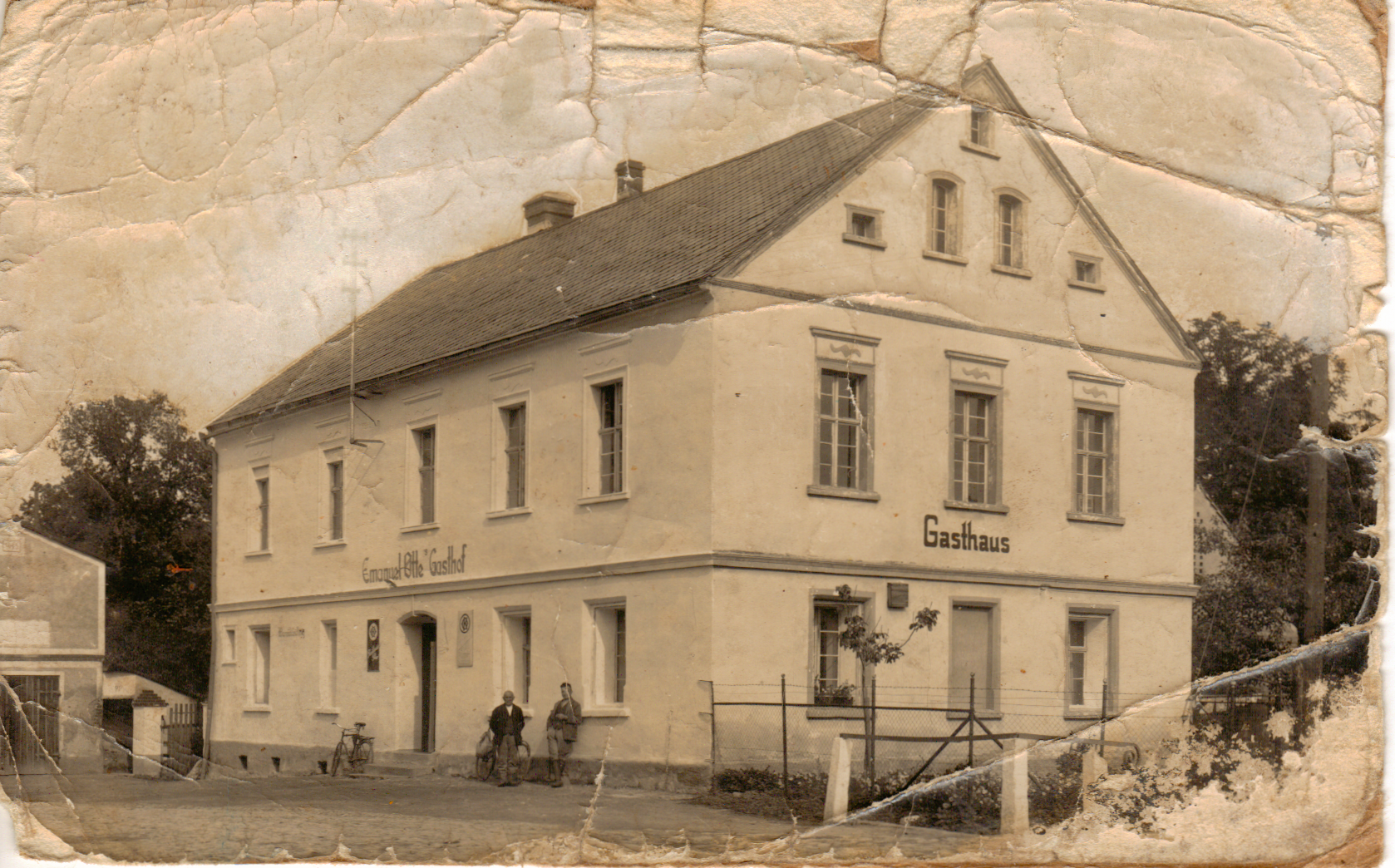
An inn run by Emanuel Otte, circa 1930. The town was then called "Peterwitz," having been part of Germany.
