= Fathers 4 Justice =

Fathers' rights organisation in the UK

- Formation: 2003; 23 years ago
- Founder: Matt O'Connor
- Headquarters: London, England
- Website: www.fathers-4-justice.org

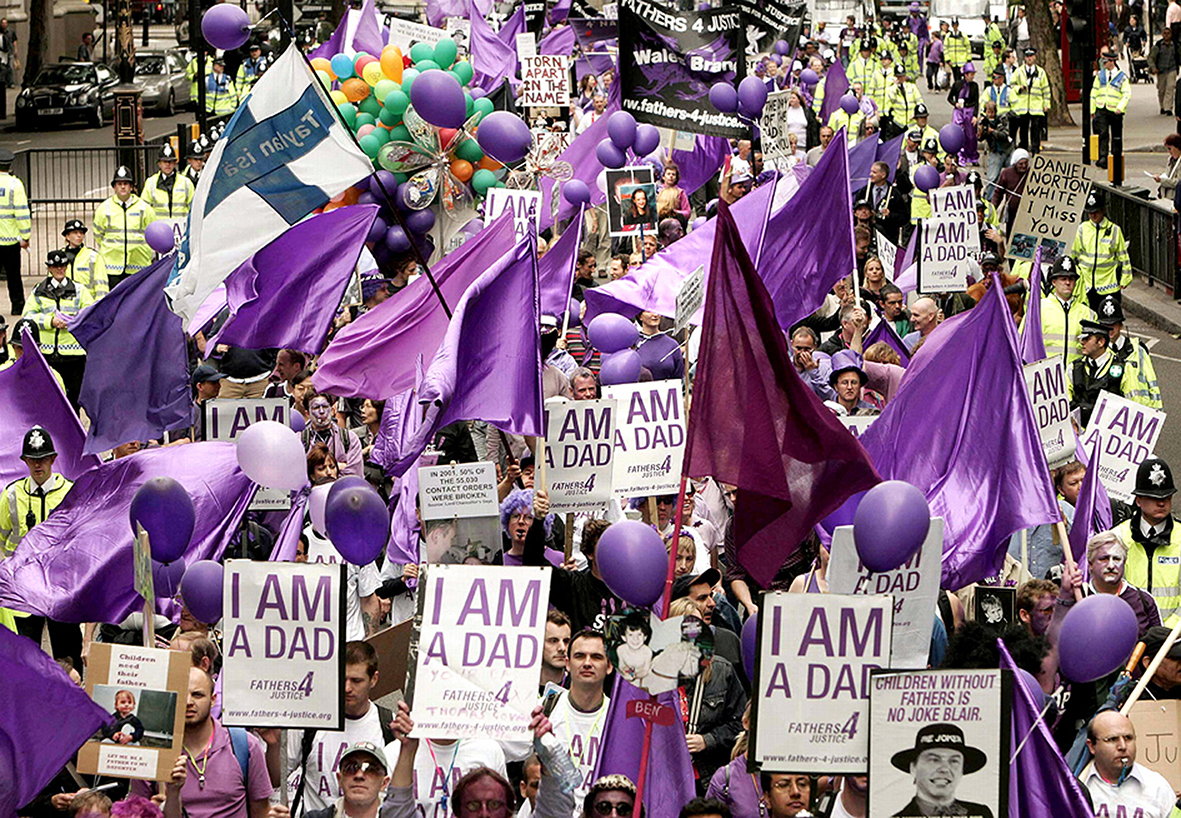
F4J's Day of the Dad demonstration in London on Father's Day, 2004

Fathers 4 Justice (F4J) is a fathers' rights organisation in the United Kingdom. Founded in 2003, the group aims to gain public and parliamentary support for changes in UK legislation on fathers' rights mainly by staging stunts and protests, often conducted in costume.

== History ==
F4J was founded in the UK by Matt O'Connor, a marketing consultant. He is the sole shareholder and a director of Fathers For Justice Limited.

== Activities ==
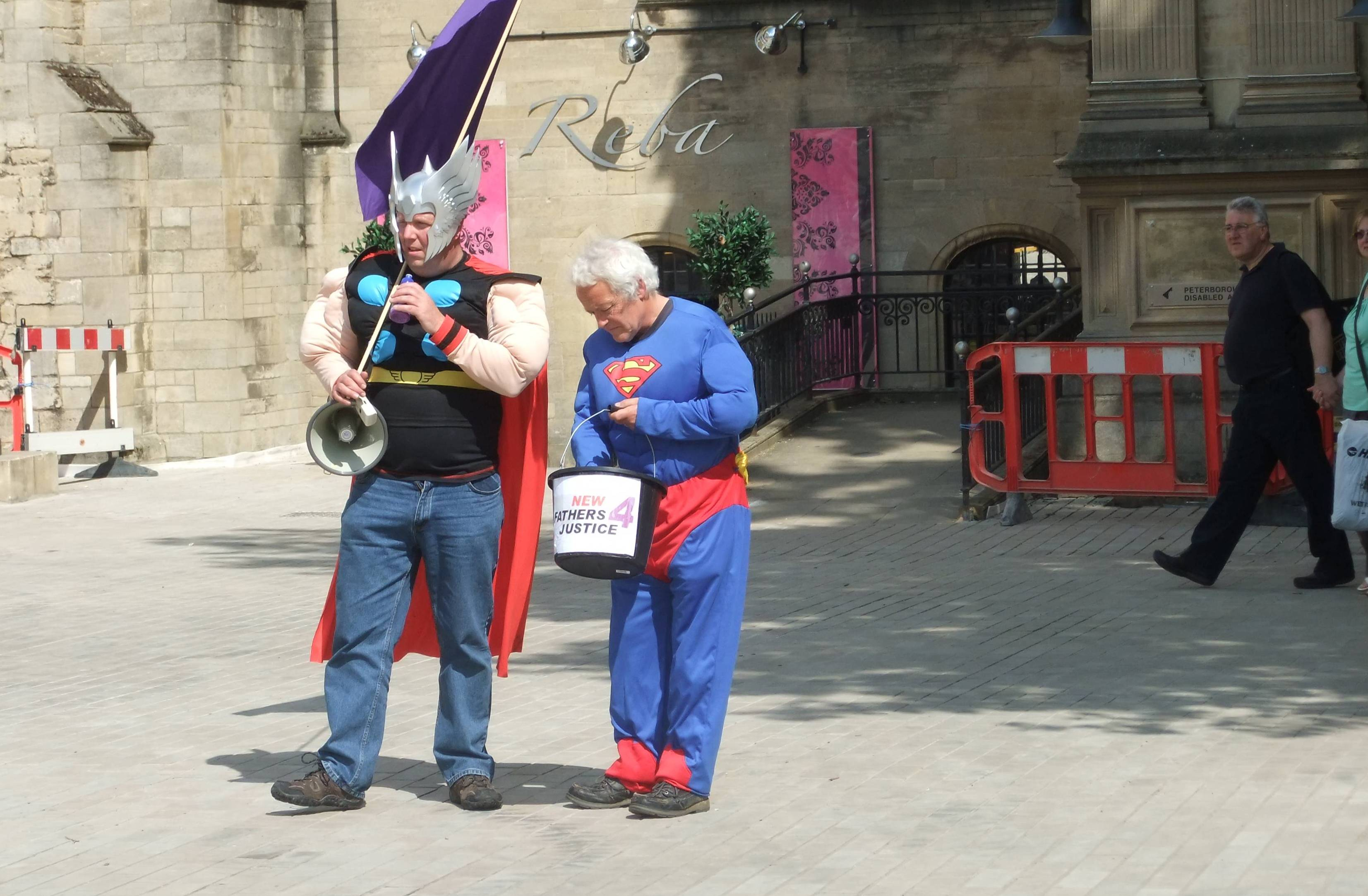
F4J protesters dressed as the comic characters Thor and Superman in Peterborough, June 2010

=== 2003 ===
On 21 October 2003, campaigners Eddie "Goldtooth" Gorecki and Jonathan "Jolly" Stanesby scaled the Royal Courts of Justice in London while dressed respectively as Batman and Robin. The following day, the group's members protested through London in a military tank in support of Goreckwi and Stanesby. Nine days later, David Chick climbed a 120 feet (37 m) crane near Tower Bridge while dressed as Spider-Man. The Metropolitan Police subsequently set up a cordon around the area that disrupted traffic through some of East London for several days. Chick was later cleared of criminal charges.

=== 2004 ===
In 2004, Stanesby carried out a "citizen's arrest" of the then-Minister of State for Children Margaret Hodge at a conference, handcuffing himself to her and stating: "Margaret Hodge, I'm arresting you for covering up child abuse." Both Stanseby and Jason Hatch (who had also attempted to handcuff himself to Hodge) were later cleared of false imprisonment charges by a jury.

On 19 May 2004, an alert was caused when two members of the group threw purple flour bombs at Tony Blair during Prime Minister's Questions at the House of Commons. Charged with public order offences, activist Guy Harrison was fined £600, and Ron Davis given a conditional discharge. Following the House of Commons incident, The Times wrote that the group "has succeeded in becoming the most prominent guerrilla pressure group in Britain... within eighteen months of its founding".

In September 2004, member Jason Hatch climbed the walls of Buckingham Palace dressed as Batman; all charges relating to his protest were later dropped. Also in September, David Chick climbed the London Eye, forcing the attraction to close. He was found not guilty of charges of causing a public nuisance.

=== 2005 ===
In May 2005, campaigners dressed as superheroes protested on top of the Crucible Theatre in Sheffield during the World Snooker Championship.

Protester Ray Barry also climbed St Peter's Collegiate Church in Wolverhampton on Fathers Day in June. He was later cleared of a public order offence charge, after which he repeated the protest on Christmas Day. On 27 September 2005, protester Guy Harrison climbed the Palace of Westminster unveiling a banner stating "Does Blair care? For Fawkes sake change family law." A jury acquitted him of the charge of committing a public nuisance offence.

=== 2006 ===
During January 2006, The Sun published a story in which it claimed F4J members planned to kidnap Leo Blair, the young son of former Prime Minister Tony Blair "for a few hours as a symbolic gesture". The police said they were aware of such a plan but added it had probably never progressed beyond the "chattering stage". However, F4J Founder O'Connor condemned the alleged plot and threatened to shut down the group because of it. Within days, the group was disbanded.

In March 2006, F4J member and barrister Michael Cox was jailed for refusing to pay money he owed to the Child Support Agency. Cox told a hearing in Southampton he refused to pay on principle, as he had joint custody of his children, and his former wife wrote to the court in support of him.

F4J then re-formed again in May and protested during the showing of the BBC lottery show The National Lottery: Jet Set on 20 May. The show was taken off-air for several minutes after six F4J protesters ran from the audience onto the stage displaying posters bearing the words: 'Family Law Lotto, Next Time It Could Be You!'.

=== 2008 ===
On 8 June 2008, two fathers from F4J climbed onto the roof of Labour Party deputy leader Harriet Harman's house while wearing superhero-style costumes; they called themselves "Captain Conception" and "Cash Gordon". One of the fathers, Mark Harris, said he wanted fathers to have the same rights as their children's mothers' new partners. He also said they would not come down unless Harman read Harris' book, Family Court Hell. In the same month, Bristol Family Court was evacuated after a fire alarm was set off in the building during a F4J protest outside the building.

On 9 July, F4J members Nigel Ace and Tony Ashby, this time in Spider-Man and Batman outfits, climbed Harman's roof and draped a banner that read "Stop The War On Dads."

=== 2010 ===
In 2010, campaigners interrupted an interview with snooker player Steve Davis, causing the BBC to cut to a pre-recorded video segment.

=== 2011 ===
In July 2011, O'Connor staged a hunger strike just outside UK Prime Minister David Cameron's home in Oxfordshire, demanding that he honour what O'Connor said were pledges about grandparents' rights to see their grandchildren, as well as rights governing shared parenting.

=== 2012 ===
In 2012, F4J staged a naked protest inside the Oxford Street branch of retailer Marks and Spencer in order to protest the shop's advertising on parenting website Mumsnet which F4J believed "promotes gender hatred".

=== 2013 ===
In June 2013, Paul Manning glued a picture of his 11-year-old son to John Constable's 1821 painting The Hay Wain in the National Gallery in London. However, F4J later publicly withdrew support for Manning in January 2014, following alleged breaches of their terms and conditions.

Also in 2013, Tim Haries spray-painted the word "Help" on a portrait of Queen Elizabeth at Westminster Abbey. O'Connor announced that he would additionally target other art works in order to highlight his campaign.

On 9 August 2013, F4J protester Martyn Judd climbed onto the balcony of the Hilton Birmingham Metropole Hotel to protest what he asserted to be the inequality of fathers' treatment in family court cases during a CAFCASS conference at the hotel. The protest came to an end when sprinklers flooded the hotel.

=== 2014 ===
On 8 January 2014, Tim Haries was found guilty of defacing the portrait of the Queen. On 5 February 2014, Haries was sentenced by Judge McCreath at Southwark Crown Court to six months in custody.

=== 2015 ===
On 30 November 2015, two men involved with the group were arrested after a few hours of standing on the roof of Queens Gallery, an art gallery on Buckingham Palace grounds.

=== 2016 ===
On 15 June 2016, three F4J protesters stormed the stage of ITV's Loose Women shouting "No Kids No Cash." The show was briefly taken off air.

On 22 August 2016, O'Connor walked on stage dressed as a priest during a live broadcast of the Rose of Tralee during Cavan Rose Lisa Reilly's interview with host Dáithí Ó Sé. He was subsequently removed from the stage by security staff before being taken away by Gardaí.

=== 2018 ===
On 4 September 2018, while streamed live on the F4J Facebook page, O'Connor and his fellow protester Paul Robinson staged a messy protest at an ASDA Supermarket in Peterborough by pouring Coco Pops and milk all over the floor in the cereal aisle. The pair claimed that Kellogg's latest slogan "Loved By Kids, Approved By Mums" was promoting cereal discrimination against dads. The pair paid for the items afterwards when police were called to the protest.

=== 2024 ===
On 15 December 2024, F4J protester Christopher Todd scaled the Trafalgar Square Christmas Tree whilst dressed as Santa and hung up a poster of Keir Starmer bearing the words: 'Put the father back into Xmas', and then proceeded to hang another poster of himself and his daughter on the Norwegian Spruce. The incident resulted in the temporary closure of Trafalgar Square whilst the police tried to talk him into coming down from the tree. He was eventually arrested and charged for causing criminal damage to the Christmas Tree, and will appear at Westminster Magistrates’ Court on January 22.

== Criticism ==
Members of the group have been accused of conducting intimidating attacks in order to upset court staff, family lawyers, and Members of Parliament. During protests outside the offices of the Children and Family Court Advisory and Support Service (CAFCASS), individual case workers were identified by name. One office of CAFCASS was forcibly entered by F4J members who then detained an unnamed employee; no criminal proceedings are known to have resulted.

Former members of the group have claimed F4J and the O'Connor family have "lost its way" by being sidetracked from reforming family law and instead descending into personal attacks on Twitter, libel (for which they were sued), and allegations of illegal acts such as putting an MP under surveillance and tracking her movements with a GPS tracking unit. Former members who do not agree with O'Connor's leadership went on to form the New Fathers 4 Justice group in 2008.

== Impact ==
An unintended result of the F4J campaign has been the exposure of flaws in security at Buckingham Palace, resulting in security enquiries or reviews there and also at the House of Commons.

== See also ==
- Child custody
- Fathers' rights movement in the UK
- Parental alienation
- Parental alienation syndrome
- Pressure groups in the United Kingdom
- Shared parenting
