= Implacable hostility =

Concept in UK child custody law

In family law in the United Kingdom implacable hostility denotes the attitude shown by one parent to another in denying access to, or contact with, their child(ren) after separation or divorce. What differentiates implacable hostility from the typical hostility that may arise after separation/divorce is that the deep-rooted nature of the hostility cannot be justified on rational grounds and measures taken by third parties including mediators and the family courts are to no avail.

== See also ==
- Domestic violence
- Emotional abuse
- Parental alienation
- Parental alienation syndrome
