= Parental responsibility (access and custody) =

Rights and privileges pertaining to parents and children

Parental responsibility is the responsibility which underpins the relationship between the children and the children's parents and those adults who are granted parental responsibility by either signing a 'parental responsibility agreement' with the mother or getting a 'parental responsibility order' from a court. The terminology for this area of law now includes matters dealt with as contact (visitation in the United States) and residence (see Residence in English law) in some states. Parental responsibilities are connected to Parents' rights and privileges.

== In European states ==
=== Scotland ===
In Scots law, issues relative to parental responsibilities are dealt with under the Children (Scotland) Act 1995, which provides for the making of 'residence' (custody), 'contact' (access), and 'specific issue' orders. These may be applied for by anyone with an interest in a child, not merely parents. Under section 1 of the 1995 Act, parental responsibilities are, where practicable and in the best interests of the child, to:

- safeguard and promote the child's health, development and welfare;
- provide the child with appropriate direction and guidance;
- maintain personal relations and direct contact with the child;
- act as the child's legal representative.

These responsibilities last until the child is aged 16, with the exception of the responsibility to provide the child with appropriate guidance, which lasts until the child is aged 18. Under section 2 of the 1995 Act those with parental responsibilities are given correlative rights to allow them to fulfill those responsibilities. These rights are:

- to have the child living with them or otherwise to regulate the child's residence;
- to appropriately control, direct or guide the child's upbringing;
- if the child is not living with them, to maintain personal relations and contact with the child on a regular basis;
- to act as the child's legal representative.

Having PRRs entitles a parent to take key decisions relating to the child, such as where they will live and go to school, and what medical treatment they should receive. In addition, parents have an obligation to provide financial support for their children under the Family Law (Scotland) Act 1985 (c 37) and the Child Support Act 1991 (c 38). In certain circumstances, this obligation continues when the child in question is beyond the age at which the parents have parental responsibilities under section 1 of the 1995 Act. The child's mother (irrespective of whether she is married to the child's father (s3(1)(a))) and the child's father, if he is “married to the mother at the time of the child’s conception or subsequently” (s 3(1)(b)), have automatic rights. In line with Scottish Law Commission proposals in 1992, the Family Law (Scotland) Act 2006 has brought Scots law in line with English law to the extent that an unmarried father will obtain parental rights and responsibilities if he is registered as the father on the birth register. A married father's PRRs continue after divorce, unless they are specifically removed by a court. If unmarried fathers or stepparents do not have PRRs, they must either make a Section 4 Agreement, or apply to the court under section 11 for rights.

=== United Kingdom ===
According to the Children Act 1989, Section 3, parental responsibility means "all the rights, duties, powers, responsibilities and authority which by law a parent of a child has in relation to the child and his property." Section 2 states that if the mother and father are married to each other at the time of birth, both acquire parental responsibility, otherwise, the mother automatically acquires it and the father has three ways of acquiring it: a) he becomes registered as the child's father according to specific paragraphs or sub-paragraphs in the Births and Deaths Registration Act 1953, the Registration of Births, Deaths and Marriages (Scotland) Act 1965, or the Births and Deaths Registration (Northern Ireland) Order 1976 (b)he and the child's mother make a parental responsibility agreement in which he acquires parental responsibility for the child or (c)the court orders that he shall have parental responsibility for the child. This act also states the process for second female parents and step-parents, to acquire parental responsibility as well as the appointment of guardians. A court can only appoint a guardian to a child who has no parent with parental responsibility for them or if the individual with whom a child was to live according to an applicable child arrangement order has died.

Parental responsibility cannot be transferred or surrendered, completely or in part. Individuals may delegate the responsibility to someone else but this doesn't mean that they aren't responsible anymore. In other words, they would still be liable for the child.

== In United States ==
Citing a constitutional right of parents to direct the upbringing of their children, the U.S. Supreme Court in Troxel v. Granville, 530 U.S. 57 (2000), held that "the interest of parents in the care, custody and control of their children is perhaps the oldest of the fundamental liberty interests recognized by this Court." This includes parents' fundamental right to make decisions concerning the care, custody, and control of their children, see, e. g., Stanley v. Illinois, 405 U. S. 645.

In Santosky v. Kramer, 455 U.S. 745 (1982), the Court held that the relationship between parent and child constitutes a fundamental liberty interest protected under the Due Process Clause of the Fourteenth Amendment. In its 5–4 decision, the Court ruled that states must establish allegations of parental unfitness by at least “clear and convincing evidence” (a higher threshold than preponderance of the evidence) before irrevocably severing parental rights. During oral arguments, Martin Guggenheim, representing the petitioners, contended that the Constitution requires that decision-makers be reasonably convinced of the necessity of permanently dissolving the family unit before imposing such a severe and irreversible deprivation of liberty.

There is a presumption that fit parents act in their children's best interests, Parham v. J. R., 442 U. S. 584, 602, 442 U.S. 584 (1979),. There is normally no reason for the State to inject itself into the private realm of the family to further question fit parents' ability to make the best decisions regarding their children, see, e.g., Reno v. Flores, 507 U. S. 292, 304.

In Meyer v. Nebraska, 262 U. S. 390, 399, 401 (1923), the Supreme Court held that the "liberty" protected by the Due Process Clause includes the right of parents to "establish a home and bring up children" and "to control the education of their own." Two years later, in Pierce v. Society of Sisters, 268 U. S. 510, 534-535 (1925), the Court again held that the "liberty of parents and guardians" includes the right "to direct the upbringing and education of children under their control." The Court explained in Pierce that "[t]he child is not the mere creature of the State; those who nurture him and direct his destiny have the right, coupled with the high duty, to recognize and prepare him for additional obligations." Id., at 535.

In Prince v. Massachusetts, 321 U. S. 158 (1944), the Court again confirmed that there is a constitutional dimension to the right of parents to direct the upbringing of their children. "It is cardinal with us that the custody, care and nurture of the child reside first in the parents, whose primary function and freedom include preparation for obligations the state can neither supply nor hinder." Id., at 166. See also Wisconsin v. Yoder, 406 U. S. 205, 232 (1972) ("The history and culture of Western civilization reflect a strong tradition of parental concern for the nurture and upbringing of their children. This primary role of the parents in the upbringing of their children is now established beyond debate as an enduring American tradition"); Quilloin v. Walcott, 434 U. S. 246, 255 (1978) ("We have recognized on numerous occasions that the relationship between parent and child is constitutionally protected"); Parham v. J. R., 442 U. S. 584, 602 (1979) ("Our jurisprudence historically has reflected Western civilization concepts of the family as a unit with broad parental authority over minor children. Our cases have consistently followed that course"); and Santosky v. Kramer, 455 U. S. 745, 753 (1982) (discussing "[t]he fundamental liberty interest of natural parents in the care, custody, and management of their child").

"In light of this extensive precedent," the Court said in Troxel, "it cannot now be doubted that the Due Process Clause of the Fourteenth Amendment protects the fundamental right of parents to make decisions concerning the care, custody, and control of their children."

== See also ==
- Parents' rights movement
- Shared parenting
- Parenting plan
- Childrens centre
- List of parenting issues affecting separated parents
- Parental Rights Amendment to the United States Constitution
