= Custody evaluation =

Legal process of evaluation of custody matters by an appointed professional

Custody evaluation (also known as "parenting evaluation") is a legal process, in which a court-appointed mental health expert or an expert chosen by the parties, evaluates a family and makes a recommendation to the court for custody matters, usually including residential custody, visitation and a parenting plan. When performing the custody evaluation, the evaluator is expected to act in the child's best interests.

== Procedure ==
If the issue of child custody is not settled before trial and the parents have serious concerns about each other's ability to parent the children involved, especially for the high-conflict cases, a child custody evaluation may be ordered by the court. Many states have laws that regulate the appointment of custody evaluators and procedures for evaluation.

The Court can order either a full or a focused evaluation.

- A "full evaluation, investigation, or assessment" is a comprehensive examination of the health, safety, welfare, and best interest of the child. A full evaluation typically requires about 15–20 hours of the evaluator's time.
- A "focused" evaluation " is an examination of the best interest of the child that is limited by court order in either time or scope. The partial or focused evaluation requires about 12–18 hours of investigation, interviews and report preparation.

Evaluation cost is normally established by the evaluator, but the parents can split the charges according to their court order.

The American Psychological Association publishes guidelines for custody evaluators. Also, Association of Family and Conciliation Courts publish guidelines that apply to the custody evaluators.

== Custody evaluation vs. litigation ==
There are significant differences between custody evaluation and a regular court procedure, such as:

- Custody evaluation held by mental health expert, not a judge. The evaluation usually takes place at his/her office, not at a courthouse.
- The evaluation may include testimonies, psychological tests, child–parent observations, additional evaluations by other professionals, etc. The parties may be requested to provide some documents to the Evaluator.
- Since the custody evaluators hearings are not held in court, many rules of civil procedure and due process do not apply.
- Parents are not required to be sworn before the evaluation testimonies, unlike in court.
- Law does not explicitly guarantee a right for either party to hear another party's evaluation testimonies, so in some cases the opposite party cannot object during the evaluation testimony, even in cases when the objections would be permitted in Court testimonies.
- The custody evaluator is not obligated to record a full transcript of testimonies or provide the transcript to the other party.
- The evaluator is not obligated to provide either party with a copy of supporting documents submitted by other side during the evaluation process.
- The evaluator is not required to provide in the final recommendations a complete list of facts or legal factors on which the decision is based. Evaluators are allowed to base some conclusions on feelings, general impressions and assumptions.
- The evaluator can decide if lawyers are permitted during the testimony of the parents. The absence of the attorneys may bring the evaluation cost down, but it also can result in legal underrepresentation of either party in the proceeding.
- Court objection rules do not apply to custody evaluations, such as rules allowing parties to object to form of the questions, irrelevant questions, calls for opinions, misleading questions, prejudicial evidences, badgering, compound questions, leading questions, hearsay evidences, illegal evidences, etc.
- Attorneys are allowed to talk with the evaluator about the case in ex parte communications (i.e. out-of-court), which is forbidden for judge and jury communications with attorneys in a court proceeding.
- It may be hard to appeal evaluator's final conclusions because recommendations can be based on general impressions, and evaluators are not required to record full transcripts or provide copies of evidences on which they have based recommendations.
- Cost of the custody evaluation may be lower than cost of the regular court proceeding, especially if both parties agreed on the evaluator's recommendations and settle the dispute without of objecting the evaluation final report in court.
- Custody evaluators are protected by quasi judicial immunity from lawsuits which is similar to judicial immunity.

== Criticism ==
A custody evaluation process must respect basic due process, but is much less formal than a judicial proceeding. A judge may base a custody decision on the final report of the evaluator despite the relative lack of due process in the custody evaluation process. Thus, it becomes possible that testimony and evidence that normally would not be permitted in the court proceeding could become a basis for the court decision.

Concerns about the evidentiary basis for a custody recommendation include:

- an evaluator could base a custody recommendation on testimony that is not taken under oath;
- one party cannot hear and object to the other party's statements or evidence during evaluation;
- testimony is not recorded;
- lawyers may be excluded;
- ex parte communications with the custody evaluator are not forbidden;
- the evaluator is not required to provide full list of facts on which his decisions are based; and
- the evaluator's recommendations can be based on guess and personal feelings.

Critics argue that the lack of formal process may infringe the legal right of a person to the procedural due process, which is guaranteed by Fifth and Fourteenth Amendments to the United States Constitution. Also, if a custody case is appealed, the lack of a formal record makes it very hard to object to the content of a final evaluation report.

As custody evaluators are often paid on an hourly basis, some critics argue that a conflict of interest may arise because the evaluator may financially benefit from unnecessary prolonging the evaluation. Even when the evaluator is paid a fixed amount, the evaluator may request additional evaluations or proceedings that could produce a financial benefit. A client might be afraid to object because the evaluator could potentially give a bad evaluation in retaliation.

A possible conflict of interest could also arise if the mental health professional who provides a custody evaluation later seeks an appointment to serve as parenting coordinator for the parties, or seeks the appointment of a partner from the same practice. Some states and the AFCC guidelines explicitly prohibit that practice, but many states allow the practice.

As most custody evaluators are not lawyers, an evaluator may make mistakes of law that affect a custody recommendation. For example, orders drafted based on an evaluator's recommendation may omit mandatory state requirements, such as the requirement to set forth the minimum amount and access of parenting time for noncustodial parent.

Some critics argue that no scientific evidence exists that a child custody evaluation results in a better outcome for children. They suggest that research data on the subject shows that child custody evaluations can have negative effect on the family. One survey suggests that 65% of parents believed that the child custody evaluation in which they participated was not in their children's best financial interest, one in four parents believed that their children experienced negative effects from the evaluation, and one in five parents reported their children were worse as a result of the child custody evaluation.
