= Children and Family Court Advisory and Support Service =

English welfare agency

- Abbreviation: Cafcass
- Formation: 1 April 2001
- Type: Non-departmental public body
- Purpose: Reporting to Courts on the Safeguarding and welfare of children involved in Public and Private law Family proceedings
- Region served: England
- Chief Executive: Jacky Tiotto
- Parent organization: Ministry of Justice
- Website: cafcass.gov.uk

The Children and Family Court Advisory and Support Service (Cafcass) is a non-departmental public body in England set up to promote the welfare of children involved in family court. It was formed in April 2001 under the provisions of the Criminal Justice and Court Services Act 2000 and is accountable to Parliament through the Ministry of Justice. Cafcass is independent of the courts, social services, education, health authorities and all similar agencies.

== Activities ==
Court proceedings for which Cafcass may provide support include:

- Parental applications under Section 8 of the Children Act 1989 for a Child Arrangements Order, including where a child lives, spends time, or otherwise has contact with each parent
- Other parental applications under Section 8 of the Children Act 1989, such as a Prohibited Steps Order or a Specific Issue Order
- Adoption cases
- Children who are subject to a social services application for a care and/ or supervision order.

Cafcass' function is set out in Section 12(1) Criminal Justice and Court Services Act 2000 which states:

"In respect of family proceedings in which the welfare of children is or may be in question, it is a function of [Cafcass] to:

(a) safeguard and promote the welfare of the children

(b) give advice to any court about any application made to it in such proceedings

(c) make provision for the children to be represented in such proceedings

(d) provide information, advice and other support for the children and their families."

== History ==
The provisions of court welfare services were the subject of two reviews. The Comprehensive Spending Review (CSR) and a subsequent review conducted jointly by the Home Office, the Lord Chancellor's Department and the Department of Health concluded that a new integrated service subsuming these functions could improve service to the courts, better safeguard the interests of children, reduce wasteful overlaps and increase efficiency.

The services spanned England and Wales and included: Family Court Welfare (FCW) (54 areas); the Guardian ad litem and Reporting Officer (GALRO) Service (59 panels) and the children's work of the Official Solicitor's (OS) Department.

The Home Office stated:

"The review announced by the Home Secretary on 16 July 1997 into the relationship between the Prison Service and probation service may herald important changes to the structure, organisation, management, working practices, human resources and funding of the probation service. Both the prison-probation review and the Comprehensive Spending Review should result in steps which should improve public confidence in community penalties."

The Home Office Prison-Probation review consultation paper did not mention family court welfare given that family court welfare was to move to a new unified family court welfare service.

The government then announced the setting-up of a unified family court welfare service. Among many key areas to be addressed were ensuring: Cafcass's statutory basis; funding to cover start-up, transitional and ongoing costs; change management of the merger of 114 autonomous bodies into a single organisation; maintenance of current casework. These were addressed by a project team, drawn from the three relevant government departments and supplemented by consultants dealing with, for example, IT, payroll, estates and finance.

The Criminal Justice and Court Services Bill was led by the Home Office as most of the Bill's provisions concerned the establishment of a National Probation Service for England and Wales. A few parts concerned Cafcass arrangements.

The Bill completed its parliamentary stages in autumn 2000. The Act's Cafcass provisions were set to commence on 1 April 2001. The short timeline created problems that took Cafcass years to resolve.

Cafcass's functions were to "(a) safeguard and promote the welfare of the children, (b) give advice to the court about any application made to it in such proceedings, (c) make provision for children to be represented in such proceedings, (d) provide information, advice and other support for the children and their families." Subordinate legislation set out the duties of Cafcass practitioners.

In 2004 Cafcass published a policy and procedure concerning domestic violence.

In 2005/06 Cafcass produced the consultation document Every Day Matters that led to a draft set of National Standards. These standards set out what service users, partner agencies and practitioners in the family justice system could expect. The standards updated the 2003 Cafcass Service Standards and Principles, and after piloting in the North-East Region, were phased in from 1 June 2007. The standards noted the importance of service-user feedback and the active engagement and participation of children in their case planning process. Cafcass asserted the importance of including children's views in the decision-making processes involved in court proceedings. Young people could offer a "Needs, Wishes and Feelings" statement directly to the judge.

The Children's Rights Team spearheaded the formation of a Young People's Board for Cafcass. This board consisted of 12 young people with experience of Cafcass's services. Since the board's formation in August 2006, they helped to shape Cafcass policies and procedures.

In 2011 the Family Justice Review, in its final report, stated the following about the Young People's Board:

'We have been impressed by the valuable work undertaken by the Cafcass Young People's Board. They provide an important perspective on the work of the family justice system and offer an intelligent and energetic challenge to the board of Cafcass. We believe that this work should be maintained through a Young People's Board for the Family Justice Service, with a remit to consider issues in both public and private law and to report directly to the service.'

The Young People's Board was expanded to cover the family justice system on a national scale and is now called The Family Justice Young People's Board. The Family Justice Young People's Board (FJYPB) is a group of over 40 children and young people aged between 8 and 25 years old who live across England. All members have either had direct lived experience of the family justice system or have an interest in children's rights and the family courts. The FJYPB is a permanent sub-group of the national Family Justice Board (FJB) and is responsible to this board. Two members of the FJYPB regularly attend FJB meetings.

In 2012 Cafcass published its Operating Framework which sets out how Cafcass meets its responsibilities as a family court social work service to children and young people, to courts and to family members, as required by legislation.

=== Wales ===
As of 1 April 2005, responsibility for the functions of Cafcass in Wales, known as CAFCASS Cymru, became the responsibility of the National Assembly for Wales. Following the changes within Welsh Government in 2007, CAFCASS Cymru became part of the Department for Health and Social Services.

== Governance ==
On 1 April 2014, responsibility for Cafcass in England transferred from the Department for Education to the Ministry of Justice.

Sally Cheshire CBE is the current Chair of the Cafcass Board, which includes eleven other members. The Cafcass Board is made up of non-executive members appointed in accordance with the Membership, Committee and Procedure Regulations 2005. The Cafcass Board establishes the overall strategic aims and objectives for Cafcass consistent with the strategic policy objectives determined by the Secretary of State. It meets quarterly to monitor the performance of Cafcass and is accountable for Cafcass fulfilling its functions.

The work of the Board is supported by three main sub-committees chaired by Board members:

- The Audit and Risk Assurance Committee (ARAC) which gives assurance to the effectiveness of the internal control and risk management systems.
- The Quality Committee which scrutinises the quality of safeguarding practice and casework.
- The Performance Committee which monitors national performance against key performance indicators and Cafcass' impact on the whole family justice system key performance measures.

There is also a Remuneration Committee which is convened as and when needed.

The Chief Executive and Accounting Officer for Cafcass is responsible and accountable to Parliament for the day-to-day operations, management and leadership of Cafcass and its handling of public funds administered to it. Jacky Tiotto became Chief Executive in autumn 2019. She was previously Director of Children's Services at the London Borough of Bexley. The Chief Executive is supported by the Corporate Management Team.

DNA scheme Regulations came into effect on 23 November 2015 with Cafcass and Cafcass Cymru funding a new DNA scheme under section 20 of the Family Law Reform Act 1969.

== Performance ==
During 2024–25, Cafcass worked with 132,416 children and young people across England. Cafcass is asked by family courts to become involved in public and private law cases as the independent voice of the child, advising the court on the issues children are facing, usually through recommendations they set out in reports to court. The primary aim of Cafcass is to make sure that children are safe and that their welfare is prioritised in family court proceedings, making sure that children's voices are heard and that family court decisions are made in their best interests. Cafcass has published a strategic plan for 2023-2026 to deliver "exceptional experiences, everywhere and every time" for children engaging with Cafcass services, and has set out its strategic priorities and programmes to deliver these.

Cafcass is set key performance indicator targets by their sponsor department, the Ministry of Justice. The data below shows the number of children Cafcass worked with in public and private law family court proceedings between April 2024 and March 2025:

Public law: Between April 2024 and March 2025, Cafcass worked with 43, 003 children in public law family court proceedings.

Private law: Cafcass worked with a total of 89, 412 children in private law cases between April 2024 and March 2025.

== Cafcass Ofsted Inspections ==
Ofsted has a duty to inspect Cafcass under section 143 of the Education and Inspections Act 2006 which requires the Chief Inspector of Education, Children's Services and Skills to inspect the performance of Cafcass functions.

Ofsted inspections of Cafcass are carried out in accordance with the Ofsted Guidance on Inspecting Local Authorities and comprise standard full inspections, and shorter 'focused visits' which happen in-between the full inspections to monitor progress. Cafcass received its first national Ofsted inspection in March 2014 and the overall judgement was 'good' with an 'outstanding' judgement for leadership and governance. Cafcass had its second national Ofsted inspection in March 2018 and Ofsted rated Cafcass as 'outstanding'. The most recent full Cafcass Ofsted inspection was carried out in January 2024 and rated Cafcass as 'outstanding' across all its judgement areas.

The Lead Inspector noted that "children and families who experience family court proceedings receive an outstanding service from Cafcass" and how the "service has improved" since the previous full inspection of 2018. However, they also urged Cafcass to improve the quality of final letters sent to independent reviewing officers by children's guardians at the end of public law proceedings to "ensure continuity of challenge to the local authority's future planning for children."

Ofsted has also reviewed the work of Cafcass with several shorter 'focused' visits which have been carried out in between the full inspections in June 2011, January 2023 and November 2025 respectively.

Cafcass publishes an annual report of its activities together with its audited accounts after the end of each financial year. Cafcass provides to the Ministry of Justice its finalised (audited) accounts in line with HM Treasury guidelines.

Cafcass is represented on the national Family Justice Board by its Chief Executive Jacky Tiotto.

== Criticism ==
In 2008, an Ofsted inspection of Cafcass service users in South Yorkshire concluded that case records often did not show how Cafcass had come to its conclusions. In a post-inspection review in 2009, Ofsted found that in four of nine recommendations, progress was inadequate.

In 2009, Ofsted inspected Cafcass: Lancashire and Cumbria service area (including Blackburn with Darwen and Blackpool). They found Cafcass to be inadequate in equality, diversity, value for money, complaints handling, service responsiveness, performance management, self-evaluation, safeguarding children and improving outcomes for children. The report stated that:

"the service area does not ensure that consistent consideration of the impact of family breakdown on outcomes for children is embedded in all aspects of case planning and reporting to court. The impact of ... the service in ensuring that all children are safe or feel safe is inadequate."

In 2009/10 The Annual Report of Her Majesty's Chief Inspector of Education, Children's Services and Skills found that "(Cafcass) is performing poorly, with four out of the five service areas inspected judged to be inadequate."

In November 2010 a parliamentary Commons Public Affairs Committee found that "Cafcass as an organisation is not fit for purpose" and that it did not make "child-based decisions".

In 2011, the Interdisciplinary Alliance for Children told a Justice Select Committee that Cafcass was "beyond reform" and "should be abolished".

A High Court judge said in 2014 that it appeared to be a practice "widespread across the country" that children were taken into foster care based on reports which family courts "cut and pasted" into their own rulings, without giving the parents the opportunity to view the reports or respond to them.

== Similar organisations in other countries ==
- Bureau Jeugdzorg and Raad voor de Kinderbescherming Netherlands
- Child Protective Services USA
- Jugendamt Austria and Germany
- CISMAI Italy

== Notes ==
Cafcass originally covered England and Wales but on 1 April 2005 Cafcass Cymru was created with responsibility transferred to the Welsh Assembly.

== See also ==
- Child custody
- Divorce
- Family law
- Parental rights
- Paternity (law)
- Residence (ENG)
- Professor Carol Smart
