= Fathers' rights movement =

Social movement interested in family law

The fathers' rights movement is a branch of the men's rights movement whose members are primarily interested in issues related to family law, including child custody and child support, that affect fathers and their children. Many of its members are fathers who desire to share the parenting of their children equally with their children's mothers—either after divorce or marital separation. The movement includes men as well as women, often the second wives of divorced fathers or other family members of men who have had some engagement with family law. Most fathers' rights advocates argue for formal gender equality.

== Demographics ==
The fathers' rights movement emerged in the West from the 1960s onwards as part of the men's movement with organizations such as Families Need Fathers, which originated in the 1970s. In the late twentieth century, the growth of the internet permitted wider discussion, publicity and activism about issues of interest to fathers' rights activists. Factors thought to contribute to the development of the fathers' rights movement include shifting household demographics brought about by rising divorce and falling marriage rates, changes in the understanding and expectations of fatherhood, motherhood and childhood as well as shifts in how legal systems impact families.

Fathers' rights groups in the West are primarily composed of white, middle or working class, heterosexual men. Members tend to be politically conservative but do not share a single set of political or social views and are highly diverse in their goals and methods. Members of the fathers' rights movement advocate for strong relationships with their children and focus on a narrowly defined set of issues based on the concerns of divorced or divorcing men. Women, often new partners including second wives or other family members of men who have had some engagement with family law and mothers without custody, are also members of the fathers' rights movement, and fathers' rights activists emphasize this. Two studies of fathers' rights groups in North America found that fifteen percent of their members were women.

The fathers' rights movement organizations Families Need Fathers and the Lone Fathers Association have campaigned for fathers' rights over many decades. Longer-lasting organizations appear to result from the long-term dedication and commitment of key individuals. Other fathers' rights groups have tended to form and dissolve quickly. Internal disagreements over ideology and tactics are common, and members tend not to remain with the groups after they have been helped.

== Political and social views ==
The fathers' rights movement has both liberal and conservative branches, with different viewpoints about how men and women compare. Although both groups agree on the victimization and discrimination against men, they disagree on why men and women differ (nature versus nurture) and traditional gender roles. The liberal version believes the differences between the genders are due to culture and supports equality between men and women; in contrast, the conservative branch believes in traditional patriarchal/complementary families and that the differences between genders are due to biology. Ross Parke and Armin Brott view the fathers' rights movement as one of three strands within the men's movement that deal almost exclusively with fatherhood, the other two being the good fathers' movement and groups forming the Christian Men's movement – the Promise Keepers being the largest.

Members of the fathers' rights movement assert that fathers are discriminated against as a result of gender bias in family law; that custody decisions have been a denial of equal rights; and that the influence of money has corrupted family law. The movement's primary focus has been to campaign (including lobbying and research) for formal equal rights for fathers, and sometimes for children, and to campaign for changes to family law related to child custody, support and maintenance, domestic violence and the family court system itself. Fathers' rights groups also provide emotional and practical support for members during separation and divorce. A subset of the fathers' rights movement is considered to be a part of the broader manosphere, a set of Internet forums promoting masculinity along with opposition to feminism.

Some fathers' rights groups have become frustrated with the slow pace of traditional campaigning for law reform; groups such as the originally UK-based Fathers 4 Justice have become increasingly vocal and visible, undertaking public demonstrations that have attracted public attention and influenced the politics of family justice. Following protests, some fathers' rights activists have been convicted of offenses such as harassment and assault. Fathers' rights groups have condemned threats and violent acts, with Matt O'Connor of Fathers 4 Justice asserting that his organization was committed to "peaceful, non-violent direct action" and that members caught engaging in intimidation would be expelled. An example of this was in January 2006, when O'Connor temporarily disbanded the group after it was revealed that a fringe subsection of members were plotting to kidnap Leo Blair, the young son of Tony Blair, the former UK Prime Minister. According to the police, the plot never progressed beyond the "chattering stage". Four months later the group was refounded.

Legal scholar Richard Collier writes that fathers' rights activists often base their arguments for reform on "anecdotal evidence and assertion" rather than "evidence-backed research", and argues that implementing their proposed changes to the law "may have potentially deleterious consequences" for mothers and children. Collier, along with researchers Martha Fineman and Michael Flood, have said the movement perpetuates negative stereotypes of women as hostile, deceptive, vindictive, and irresponsible as well as the stereotype that women are out to take advantage of men financially. Collier links such negative views of women with ideas of a crisis of masculinity within the broader men's movement, often in tandem with "virulent" anti-feminism.

== Main issues ==
=== Family court system ===
Fathers' rights campaigners advocate for greater influence of fathers in the lives of children, especially after divorce. Sociologists Melissa Blais and Francis Dupuis-Déri have identified the fathers' rights movement as a primary gateway for recruitment into the broader men's rights movement. Fathers' rights activists argue that family law and family courts are biased against fathers, especially in regards to child custody.

Conversely, sociologist Michael Flood argues that fathers' lack of involvement with their children before separation plays a larger role in obstructing their access to children after divorce. Flood argues that some fathers' rights groups "seem more concerned with re‐establishing paternal authority and fathers' decision‐making related to their children's and ex‐partners' lives", and "have done little to foster fathers' positive involvement in children's lives". Critics of the movement argue that fathers' groups ignore actual trends in family law that seek to affirm the symbolic importance of fathers within a heteronormative family structure.

Stephen Baskerville, president of the American Coalition of Fathers and Children and fathers' rights advocate, defines court-determined custody as not a right to parent one's children but as the power to prevent the other partner from parenting. He states that the outcome of divorce is overly one-sided and is initiated by mothers in more than two-thirds of cases – especially when children are involved. He also states that divorce provides advantages for women such as automatic custody of the children and financial benefits in the form of child support payments. Members of the FR movement also state that family courts are slow to help fathers enforce their parental rights, and are expensive and time-consuming.

Baskerville has also stated that family courts are secretive, censoring and punitive towards fathers who criticize them. He also claims that employees and activists within the courts support and benefit from the separation of children from their parents and that family law today represents civil rights abuses and intrusive perversion of government power.

Others contest these conclusions, stating that family courts are biased in favor of fathers and that the lower percentage of separated fathers as custodial parents is a result of choices made by fathers rather than bias of family courts. Other writers state that fathers' rights activists incorrectly maintain that the courts are biased against fathers while in reality the vast majority of cases are settled by private agreement and fathers voluntarily relinquish primary custody of their children, which explains the lower percentage of custodial fathers; and that the "bias" of courts is in favour of the primary caregiver, not mothers per se. Collier writes that fathers' rights activists "misread the gendered nature of law's regulation of shared parenting historically". According to sociologist Michael Flood, father's rights activists have exaggerated the disparity in custody awards between mothers and fathers, and ignored the fact that in the vast majority of cases, fathers voluntarily relinquish custody of their children through private arrangements; either because they are willing to do so, or because they do not expect a favorable court ruling.

=== Custody and parenting ===
According to the BBC, "Custody law is perhaps the best-known area of men's rights activism". Psychologist Linda Nielsen writes that "much misinformation about [Joint Physical Custody] children and their parents has made its way into the media, onto the Internet, and into the hands of legislators, mental health and family court practitioners, and parents".

Fathers' rights activists call for laws creating a rebuttable presumption of 50/50 shared custody after divorce or separation, so that children would spend equal time with each parent unless there were reasons against it.

Members of the fathers' rights movement and their critics disagree about the correlation of negative developmental outcomes for children to sole custody situations. Social scientist V. C. McLoyd states that father absence covaries with other relevant family characteristics such as the lack of an income from a male adult, the absence of a second adult, and the lack of support from a second extended family system and conclude that it is the negative effects of poverty, and not the absence of a father, that result in negative developmental outcomes.

Members of the fathers' rights movement criticize the best interests of the child standard currently used in many countries for making custody decisions. Some feminist groups have stated that if shared parenting were ordered, fathers would not provide their share of the daily care for the children.

Stephen Baskerville states that shared parenting has been demonstrated to reduce parental conflict by requiring parents to cooperate and compromise, and that it is the lack of constraint by one parent resulting from the ability of that parent to exclude the other, that results in increased parental conflict. He further states that only when child support guidelines exceed true costs do parents ask for or seek to prevent changes in parenting time for financial reasons, adding that any argument that a parent is asking for increased parenting time to reduce child support is at the same time an argument that the other parent is making a profit from child support.

Baskerville describes no-fault or unilateral divorce based on no fault as a power grab by the parent that initiates the divorce and he also states that fathers have a constitutional right to shared control of their children and through political action they intend to establish parental authority for both parents and for the well-being of their children. Members of the fathers' rights movement state that a rebuttable presumption for shared parenting preserves a child's protection against unfit or violent parents.

Sociologist Michael Flood states that supporters of shared parenting use it only as a symbolic issue related to "rights", "equality", and "fairness" and that the father's rights movement is not actually interested in the shared care of their children or the children's wishes, adding that fathers' rights groups have advocated policies and strategies that are harmful to mothers and children and also harmful to the fathers themselves. In contrast, social scientist Sanford Braver states that the bad divorced dad image is a myth that has led to harmful and dangerous social policies.

Some fathers' rights activists object to the term visitation, which they see as denigrating to their level of authority as parents, and instead prefer the use of parenting time.

=== Child support ===
From the source Northwestern University Law Review. Authors Tait, Anderson explained that "child support is a ubiquitous kind of debt, common to all income and wealth levels, with data showing that approximately 30% of the U.S. adult population has either been subjected to pay child support or has received it." Members of the fathers' rights movement campaign for the reform of child support guidelines, which in most Western countries are based on maintaining the children's standard of living after separation, and on the assumption that the children live with one parent and never with the other. Activists state that the current guidelines are arbitrary, provide mothers with financial incentives to divorce, and leave fathers with little discretionary income to enjoy with the children during their parenting time. In the US, fathers' rights activists propose guidelines based on a Cost Shares model, in which child support would be based on the average income of the parents and the estimated child costs incurred by both parents. Laura W. Morgan has stated that it focuses on the relative living standards of divorcing parents rather than the best interests of the children and financially supporting them at the same level after divorce.

Solangel Maldonado states that the law should value a broader definition of fathering for poor fathers by reducing the focus on collecting child support and encouraging the informal contributions (such as groceries, clothes, toys, time with the children) of these fathers by counting these contributions as child support.

Members of the fathers' rights movement state that child support should be terminated under certain conditions, such as if the custodial parent limits access to the children by moving away against the wishes of the other parent, gives fraudulent testimony, or if paternity fraud is discovered, adding that two men should not have to pay child support for the same child.

Stephen Baskerville states that it is often difficult for fathers in financial hardship or who take on a larger caregiving role with their children to have their child support payments lowered. He also states that unemployment is the primary cause of child support arrears, and further states that these arrearages make the father subject to arrest and imprisonment without due process.

Baskerville states that the purpose of child support should be publicly determined, and enforcement programs must be designed to serve that purpose, observing the due process of law.

Some legal scholars and feminist writers have said that the fathers' rights movement puts the interests of fathers above the interests of children, for example by suggesting that it is acceptable for fathers to withdraw child support if they are not given access to their children, or by lobbying for changes in family law that would allegedly heighten children's exposure to abusive fathers, and would allegedly further endanger mothers who are victims of domestic violence.

Supporters of the fathers' rights movement assert that some women make false claims of domestic violence, sexual or child abuse in order to gain an upper hand in divorce, custody disputes and/or prevent fathers from seeing their children, and they state that lawyers advise women to make such claims. They state that false claims of domestic violence and child abuse are encouraged by the inflammatory "win or lose" nature of child custody hearings, that men are presumed to be guilty rather than innocent by police and by the courts, Lawyers and advocates for abused women assert that family court proceedings are commonly accompanied with allegations of domestic violence because of the prevalence of domestic violence in society rather than as a result of false allegations of domestic violence. They also assert that domestic violence often begins or increases around the time of divorce or separation. Sociologist Michael Flood argues that fathers' rights groups have had a damaging impact on the field of domestic violence programming and policy by attempting to discredit female victims of violence, to wind back the legal protections available to victims and the sanctions imposed on perpetrators, and to undermine services for the victims of men's violence. Baskerville asserts that when child abuse occurs the perpetrator is not likely to be the father, and that child abuse most often occurs after the father has been separated from his children. Baskerville proposes that domestic violence and child abuse must be adjudicated as criminal assault, observing due process protections, and that government funding for programs addressing these issues must be made contingent on such protections.

=== Parenting time interference ===
Fathers' rights activists have advocated for the inclusion of parental alienation syndrome (PAS), a proposed syndrome developed by Richard A. Gardner that alleges unjustified disruption of the relationship between a parent and a child is caused by the other parent. Neither PAS nor parental alienation disorder (PAD) are accepted by any legal or mental health organization. Despite lobbying, parental alienation syndrome was not included in the draft of the DSM manual that was released in 2010, though parental alienation disorder does appear as a "Condition Proposed by Outside Sources" to be reviewed by a working group.

=== No-fault divorce ===
Stephen Baskerville states that laws establishing no-fault divorce did not stop at removing the requirement that grounds be cited for a divorce, so as to allow for divorce by "mutual consent"; it also allows either spouse to end the marriage without any agreement or fault by the other. Phyllis Schlafly states that no-fault divorce should be referred to as unilateral divorce.

Baskerville states that laws establishing no-fault divorce can be seen as one of the boldest social experiments in modern history that have effectively ended marriage as a legal contract. He states that it is not possible to form a binding agreement to create a family, adding that government officials can, at the request of one spouse, end a marriage over the objection of the other. He states that no-fault divorce has left fathers with no protection against what he describes as the confiscation of their children.

Baskerville states that fault has entered through the back door in the form of child custody hearings, and that the forcibly divorced spouse ("defendant") is presumed guilty. Similarly, other members of the fathers' rights movement believe that men fail to get appropriate recognition of their innocence as a result of no-fault divorce.

Baskerville proposes "reasonable limits" on no-fault divorce when children are involved. Some members of the FRM support the end of the no-fault principle in child custody and divorce decisions. Some members of the fathers' rights movement state that the availability of divorce should also be limited.

=== Government involvement ===
Baskerville states that governments throughout the United States and other democracies are engaged, by accident or design, in a campaign against fathers and fatherhood, which in his view, lies at the root of a larger problem that threatens marriage, destroys families, devastates the lives of many children, and undermines parents, democracy and accountability. Baskerville also states that it is the removal of the father from the family through divorce that initiates problems for which the government is perceived as the solution rather than the problem, and that these problems are then used to justify the continued existence and expansion of the government. Members of the fathers' rights movement state that modern divorce involves government officials invading parents' private lives, evicting people from their homes, seizing their property, and taking away their children.

=== Parental and reproductive rights ===
Fathers' rights advocates have worked for the right of unwed, otherwise fit, fathers to get custody if the mother tries to have their child adopted by a third party or if child welfare authorities place the child in foster care. Fathers' rights activists seek a gender-neutral approach in which unwed men and women would have equal rights in adoption issues, an approach that critics state does not sufficiently acknowledge the different biological roles in procreation and pregnancy, and the disparity in society's social and economic structures. In the US, some states have passed laws to protect the rights of unwed fathers to custody. Courts have increasingly supported these rights, though judges often require evidence that the father has shown interest in, and given financial and emotional support to, the mother during pregnancy.

Some fathers' rights advocates have sought the right to prevent women from having an abortion without the father's consent, based on the idea that it is discriminatory for men not to have the ability to participate in a decision to terminate a pregnancy. This option is not supported by any laws in the United States. Advocates have also expressed the desire to have a "financial abortion" in which the option exists to sever all responsibility for child support for an unwanted child. Commenting on this, legal scholar Kim Buchanan states, "The only way men's lack of a pregnancy opt-out can be framed as a gender injustice is to accept that men have a right to visit the consequences of unprotected sex (or contraceptive failure) exclusively on their female partners." Some feminists, however, such as former president of the feminist organization National Organization for Women, attorney Karen DeCrow, have supported the "financial abortion" concept, stating "if a woman makes a unilateral decision to bring pregnancy to term, and the biological father does not, and cannot, share in this decision, he should not be liable for 21 years of support... autonomous women making independent decisions about their lives should not expect men to finance their choice.

=== Parental leave ===
Pressure from father's rights groups, among others, have in several countries resulted in gender-neutral program(s) eligible for parental leave. While historically, maternity benefits were given to mothers based on the physical biology of childbirth, including the need to protect the health and financial well-being of the woman and child, parental leave benefits emphasize gender-neutral child-rearing, the benefits of the participation of fathers in children's care, and redress discrimination against men who wish to be involved with their infants.

== Criticism ==
Advocates of substantive equality argue against formal equality frequently referenced by fathers' rights advocates. The gestation investment is seen by some as one justification for substantive equality between fathers' rights and mothers' rights.

== See also ==
- Fathers' rights movement by country
- Masculism
- Men's rights movement
- Paper abortion
- Stay-at-home dad

== Works cited ==
- Baskerville, Stephen (2007). Taken into Custody: The War Against Fatherhood, Marriage, and the Family. Cumberland House Publishing. ISBN 978-1-58182-594-7 – via the Internet Archive.
- Collier, Richard; Sheldon, Sally, eds. (2006a). Fathers' Rights Activism and Law Reform in Comparative Perspective. Hart Publishing. ISBN 978-1-84113-629-5.
- Crowley, Jocelyn E. (2008). Defiant Dads: Fathers' Rights Activists in America. Cornell University Press. ISBN 978-0-8014-4690-0 – via the Internet Archive.
- Crowley, Jocelyn E. (2003). The Politics of Child Support in America. Cambridge University Press. ISBN 978-0-521-53511-3.
- Parke, RD; Brott, AA (1999). Throwaway Dads: The Myths and Barriers that Keep Men from Being the Fathers They Want to Be. Houghton Mifflin. ISBN 978-0-395-86041-0 – via the Internet Archive.
