= Family court =

Court dealing with matters of family law

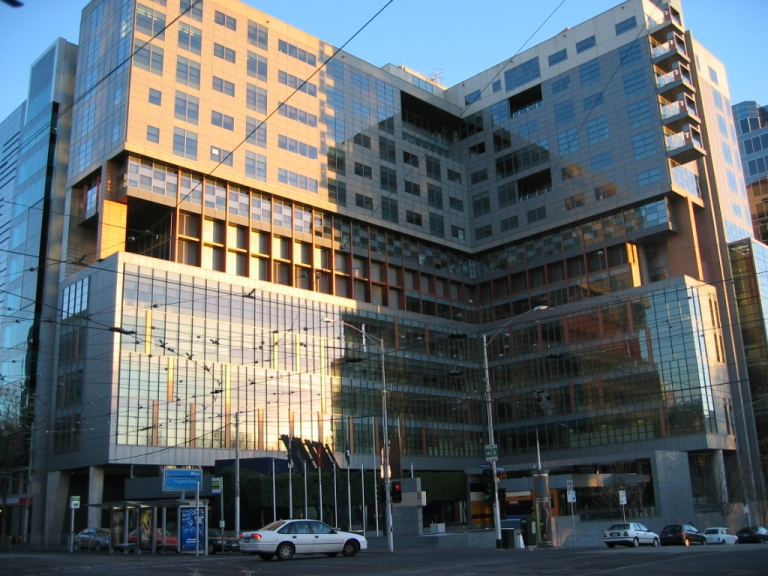
The Federal Court Building on the corner of La Trobe Street and William Street, the location of the Melbourne division of the Family Court of Australia

Family courts were created in the 20th century to be a Court of Equity convened to decide matters and make orders in relation to family law, including child support, and could disregard certain legal requirements as long as the petitioner/plaintiff came into court with "clean hands" and the request was reasonable, "quantum meruit". Changes in laws and rules have made this distinction superfluous.

In some jurisdictions, family courts hear all cases that relate to familial and domestic relationships. Each US state and each country has a different system utilized to address family law cases including decisions regarding divorce cases.

Family courts have been accused of sentencing disparity both discriminating against women and discriminating against men.

== In the United States ==
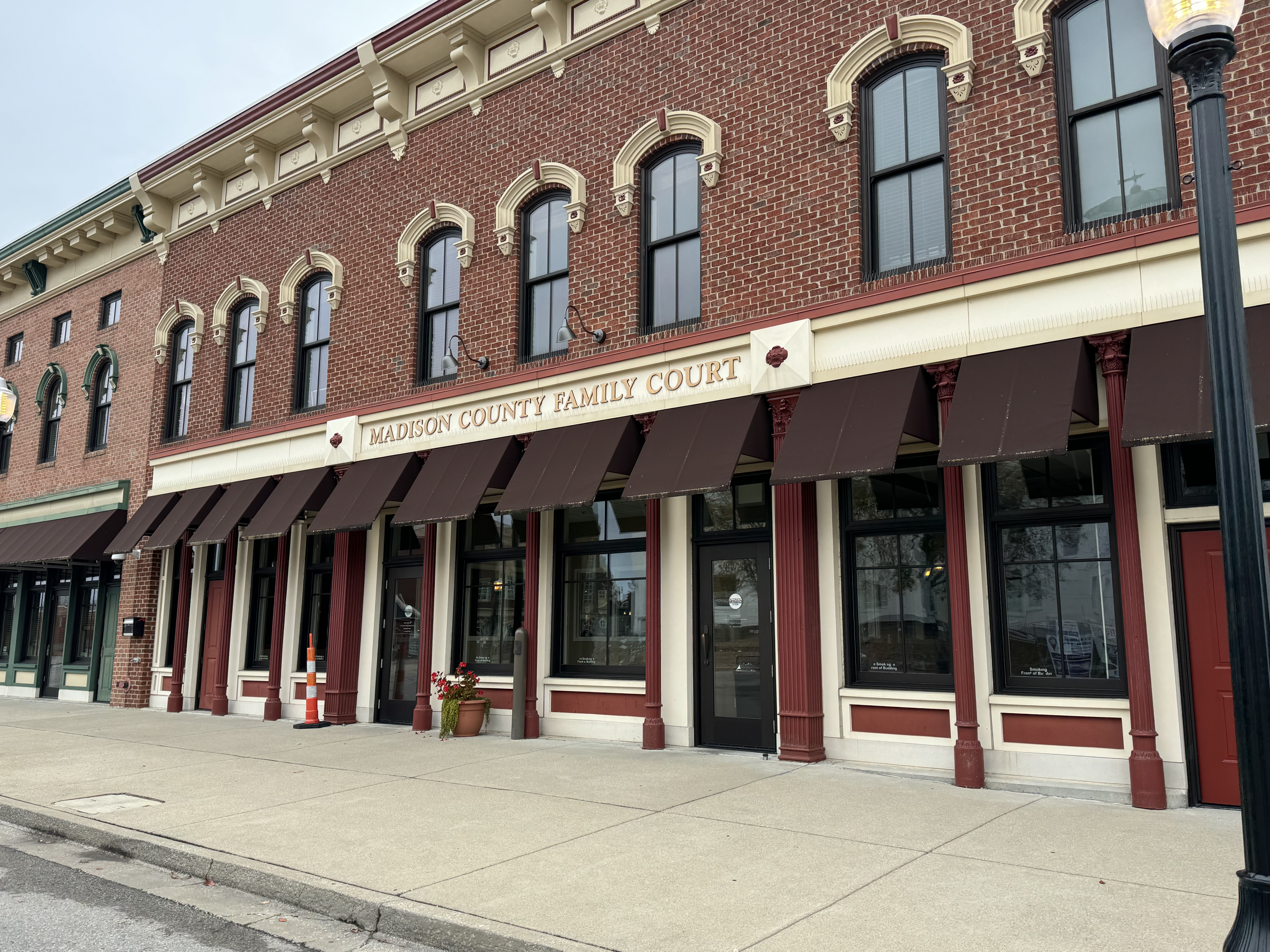
Madison County Family Court in Richmond, Kentucky.

Family courts were first established in the United States starting in the late 1910s at the behest of probation officers invested in the success of domestic relations courts. Domestic relations courts had been established in 15 U.S. cities, starting in 1910 in New York City, for child support enforcement. Members of the National Probation Association (NPA) advanced the idea that "combining criminal nonsupport, juvenile delinquency, and divorce into a unified 'family court' would reduce jurisdictional overlap and ensure deep, rehabilitative treatment by probation officers across family-related conflicts." This idea was minimally successful and led to varied founding and reformation of family courts throughout the 1920s and 1930s.

The original criminal nature of family courts was slowly replaced by an impliedly civil approach, starting in the 1930s with a New York law designed to treat nonsupport cases as a civil matter. The shift to civil nonsupport across the country and the addition of divorce jurisdiction led to family court dockets becoming more civil in nature. Those found in contempt in civil nonsupport cases were still incarcerated as they were in the criminal nonsupport system.

In 1933, New York established a standalone family court, "somewhat confusedly" called the Domestic Relations Court, to further remove family matters from criminal jurisdiction. However, in reality, this new family court and those that followed blended criminal and civil components, removing the constitutional protections offered by criminal procedure while still maintaining criminal-like enforcement mechanisms. In addition, New York passed the Uniform Support of Dependents Law (USDL) in order to provide a mechanism for interstate civil enforcement of family court rulings.

Later, as probation officer involvement dwindled (partially attributable to the model Family Courts Act produced by the NPA in 1959) and more family courts retained jurisdiction over divorce, the machinery of family courts began to look even more civil. However, some aspects of family court enforcement still retain their criminal roots in heavy state involvement, including incarceration as a consequence of nonpayment of child support, wage garnishment, revocation of driver's licenses, and denial of passport applications. Some family courts still use older criminal nonsupport statutes, even though protections afforded by constitutional criminal procedures are oftentimes not present. Most cases are presided over by a single judge without a jury, except in the State of Texas, where parents have a right to trial by jury. These muddy distinctions between criminal and civil proceedings within family courts have led to calls for reformation, arguing that the seemingly civil nature of family courts is a method used to circumvent criminal procedural protections while still maintaining criminal enforcement machinery.

== In England and Wales ==
Cases involving children are primarily dealt with under the Children Act 1989, amongst other statutes. As of April 22, 2014, there are two family courts:

- The Family Division of the High Court
- The Family Court

The Family Court was created by Part 2 of the Crime and Courts Act 2013, merging the family law functions of the county courts and magistrates' courts into one.

Two scenarios are covered by the Children Act of 1989: private law cases, where the applicant and respondent are usually the child's parents; and public law cases, where the applicant is the local authority and the parents are usually the respondents. There is much debate at present over whether the manner in which the law is administered generally leads to outcomes that are beneficial to the families concerned. In this context, see fathers' rights.

Cases involving domestic violence are primarily dealt with under Part IV of the Family Law Act 1996.

In England, a family court may be called upon to order child maintenance payments, when the child is either under the age of 16, or under the age of 20 receiving a full-time education (but not higher than A-Level or equivalent).

Alleged abusive partners were sometimes allowed to cross examine their victims in ways that could be extremely stressful. Peter Kyle described this process as "abuse and brutalization" of women by the legal system: "Mothers need the protection of the law and they need to know in advance that the system is there to look out and protect their interests. It only takes one woman to be placed in a situation where she can be legally be asked by the man who has violently abused her; 'When did you last have sex?' That only has to happen once to realize that the system is corrupted and domestic abuse is going on in our system in the courtroom." Changes to this process are forthcoming.

== In India ==
The Family Courts Act, 1984, was enacted by the Parliament of India to establish Family Courts for resolving disputes related to marriage and family affairs in a conciliatory manner. Family Courts are established for areas with a population exceeding one million and may be established for other areas as deemed necessary by the State Government. Family Courts have jurisdiction over various matters, including divorce, restitution of conjugal rights, guardianship, maintenance, and disputes related to property and matrimonial status.

The Act emphasizes the importance of settlement and reconciliation, and Family Courts are encouraged to make efforts to assist parties in arriving at a settlement. The proceedings in Family Courts may be held in camera, and they have the authority to seek the assistance of medical experts, welfare agencies, and other professionals.

== In Hong Kong ==
The Family Court of Hong Kong mainly deals with divorces and welfare maintenance for children.

== See also ==
- Alimony
- Family law
- Family Procedure Rules
- Family Court of Australia
- Matrimonial law in the Catholic Church
- Islamic family jurisprudence
- Subject-matter jurisdiction
