= Carol S. Bruch =

American jurist (born 1941)

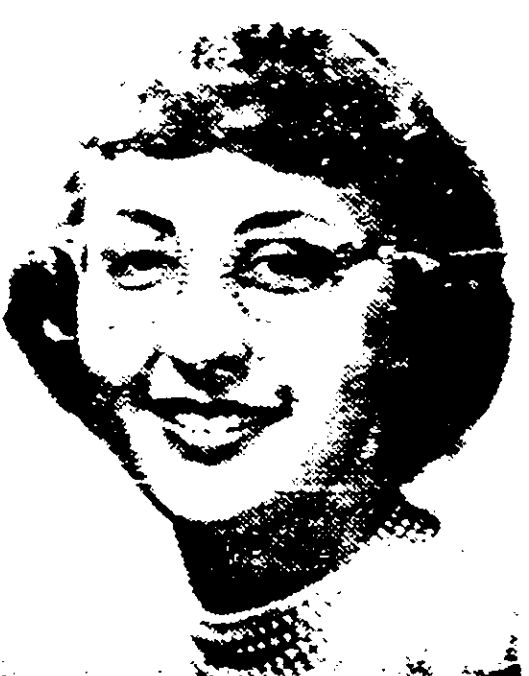
- Bruch as a first-year Shimer College student in 1958
- Born: June 11, 1941 (age 85); Winnebago, Illinois, U.S.
- Occupations: Legal scholar; professor

Academic background
- Education: Shimer College (A.B.); UC Berkeley School of Law (J.D.)

Carol Sophie Bruch (born June 11, 1941) is an American legal scholar and professor emerita of the law school at the University of California, Davis. A recognized authority on family marital property law, and private international law, she has influenced and worked on the drafting of family law statutes in California and other US states, and also international agreements. She holds a JD from UC Berkeley School of Law and an AB from Shimer College.

== Early life and education ==
Bruch was born into a highly educated family in the small town of Winnebago, Illinois, near Rockford; she was the second of four children. Her mother, Margarete Willstätter Bruch, Ph.D., (1906-1964), was a chemical physicist and the daughter of Nobel laureate Richard Willstätter. Her father, Dr. Ernest Bruch (1905-1974), was a physician and director of nuclear medicine at Rockford's St. Anthony Hospital, Her parents had emigrated from Germany to the United States in the 1930s as Germany became increasingly inhospitable.

In 1957, at age 16, Bruch entered Shimer College through the school's early entrance program. The program, established in 1950 under Ford Foundation support and still operating today, allows students to enter college after completing the 10th or 11th grade. Excelling in her studies, Bruch was a member of the college honor society. Her fellow honor students at Shimer, which then enrolled approximately 200 students, included future international relations scholars Alan Dowty and Robert Keohane.

As part of the experimental Great Books curriculum it shared with the University of Chicago, Shimer made extensive use of placement tests. Through these tests, Bruch acquired a total of 24 credits toward graduation before taking a class, and was therefore able to graduate after only three years.

Bruch received her A.B. degree on June 5, 1960, at age 18. Six days after graduating from Shimer, Bruch married Jack Myers. They had two children together. Bruch taught elementary school for a time in Madagascar, when her husband was working there.

After her young child started school, Bruch enrolled at the UC Berkeley School of Law (Boalt Hall), where she received her JD in 1972. She was an editor of the California Law Review, and also authored an article on the conflict of laws, which has remained an area of focus throughout her career. During law school, Bruch's honors included a Selected Professions Fellowship from the American Association of University Women After graduation, she clerked for Justice William O. Douglas on the United States Supreme Court in the same term as Janet Meik Wright. Bruch was the fourth woman to hold a Supreme Court clerkship, and the first who was a mother.

Eighteen months after her law school graduation in June 1972, Bruch and her husband divorced. She has credited the experiences of both married and single parenthood with informing her life's work in family law.

== Legal and academic career ==
Bruch joined the faculty of the UC Davis School of Law in 1975, where she would remain throughout her career. She taught in the fields of Family Law, Marital Property Law, the conflict of laws (private and international) and Contract Law. In 1975, Bruch prepared a casebook for the study of child law entitled Cases and Materials on Children and the Law, which she revised in 1976. Starting in 1976 she began to draft California legislation on family law issues, many in her individual capacity, and some as a consultant for the California Law Revision Commission. She taught or was a visiting scholar at law schools around the world and was a long-time board member and editor in comparative law circles.

Bruch has authored influential amicus briefs in two key California Supreme Court family law cases. The first of these was Marvin v. Marvin, which laid the groundwork for modern California non-marital cohabitation law; an expanded version of this has been frequently reprinted. The second was In re Marriage of Burgess, a 1996 case that established key precedents on child custody law in cases of parental relocation. The court cited and adopted elements of her reasoning in both cases.

Not limiting her academic work to the field of law, from 1995 to 2001, Bruch chaired an interdisciplinary Ph.D. program in human development at UC Davis. Bruch was given the position of "Research Professor of Law" in 2001, which she continues to hold as of 2012. She was named Distinguished Professor Emerita in 2005.

=== Parental alienation syndrome ===
Bruch is most widely known for her 2001 paper challenging the use of Richard A. Gardner's parental alienation syndrome (PAS) theory in child custody cases. She published an expanded version of this in 2002. Taking what has often been characterized as a feminist or child advocate position, Bruch argued that PAS theory was used disproportionately to the disadvantage of mothers and children in child custody cases, and that in practice it was geared to discredit accusations of sexual abuse:

Although Dr Gardner sometimes states that his analysis does not apply to cases of actual abuse, the focus of his attention is directed at discerning whether the beloved parent and child are lying, not whether the target parent is untruthful or has behaved in a way that might explain the child’s aversion.

She also criticized Gardner's excessive reliance on his own non-peer-reviewed findings. A rejoinder by Gardner was published on his website in both English and German. Bruch responded in turn with rebuttals in both English and German.

Bruch's writings, and those of other critics of PAS, have received considerable pushback from defenders of PAS, with claims including that Bruch and other critics misunderstood the theory itself, misrepresented the theory's practical application, failed to account for the full range of research findings, or unfairly disparaged Gardner himself. The doubts cast on PAS by Bruch's work and others have however proven influential, with the theory receiving an increasingly skeptical treatment by the courts and being rejected for inclusion in the DSM-5. A 2009 survey of practitioners found that few considered PAS to be admissible as evidence. PAS remains the subject of lively legal and scholarly dispute, with Bruch's paper still frequently cited.

== Honors and public service ==
In 1989, Bruch served as a member of the U.S. government's delegation to an Organization of American States diplomatic session that drafted Inter-American Conventions. In the same year, she joined the Advisory Committee on Private International Law to the US Secretary of State as the representative of the Association of American Law Schools, continuing to serve in that capacity until 2008. In recognition of this, her amicus briefs and her extensive pro bono legislative work, she was granted the first "Distinguished Scholarly Public Service Award" of the UC Davis Academic Senate in 1990.

Bruch was granted an honorary doctorate by the University of Basel in 2000, in recognition of her scholarship and activism on behalf of children.

== Works cited ==
- Bow, James N.; et al. (2009). "Examining Parental Alienation in Child Custody Cases: A Survey of Mental Health and Legal Professionals". American Journal of Family Therapy. 37 (2): 127–145. doi:10.1080/01926180801960658. S2CID 45543509.
- Bruch, Carol S. (2002). "Parental Alienation Syndrome and Alienated Children – getting it wrong in child custody cases" (PDF). Child and Family Law Quarterly. 14 (4): 381–400.
- Houchin, Timothy M.; et al. (2012). "The Parental Alienation Debate Belongs in the Courtroom, Not in DSM-5". Journal of the American Academy of Psychiatry and the Law. 40 (1): 127–131. PMID 22396350.
- Lorandos, Demosthenes (2006). "Parental Alienation Syndrome: Detractors and the Junk Science Vacuum". In Richard Gardner; et al. (eds.). The International Handbook of Parental Alienation Syndrome: Conceptual, Clinical And Legal Considerations. Charles C Thomas Publisher. pp. 397–418. ISBN 0398076472.
- Rand, Deirdre C. (2011). "Parental Alienation Critics and the Politics of Science". American Journal of Family Therapy. 39: 48–71. doi:10.1080/01926187.2010.533085. S2CID 144701255.
- Rürup, Reinhard (2008). "Ida Margarete Willstätter (Bruch-Willstätter)". Schicksale und Karrieren: Gedenkbuch für die von den Nationalsozialisten aus der Kaiser-Wilhelm-Gesellschaft vertriebenen Forscherinnen und Forscher. Wallstein Verlag. pp. 365–367. ISBN 978-3892447979.
- Warshak, Richard A. (2006). "Social Science and Parental Alienation: Examining the Disputes and the Evidence". In Richard Gardner; et al. (eds.). The International Handbook of Parental Alienation Syndrome: Conceptual, Clinical And Legal Considerations. Charles C Thomas Publisher. pp. 352–371. ISBN 0398076472.

== See also ==
- List of law clerks for the fourth seat of the Supreme Court of the United States
