= DSPP =

DSPP may refer to:

- Dallas Society for Psychoanalytic Psychology, see for example Richard Warshak
- Dentin sialophosphoprotein, a protein encoded by the DSPP gene
- Direct stock purchase plan, a type of investment option (see Dividend reinvestment plan § Acquiring stock)
- German Social Democratic Party (Poland), sometimes denoted DSPP
