= Donald R. Colvin =

American lawyer (1918–1996)

Donald Roy Colvin
- Born: July 2, 1918; Denver, Colorado, U.S.
- Died: March 12, 1996 (aged 77); Los Angeles, California, U.S.
- Education: University of Washington (BA, LLB)
- Occupation: Attorney
- Known for: Law clerk for Justice William O. Douglas

Donald Roy Colvin (July 2, 1918 – March 12, 1996) was an attorney in Los Angeles, California, who clerked for Justice William O. Douglas of the U.S. Supreme Court during the 1945 Term.

== Biography ==
Donald Colvin was born in Denver, Colorado, to Emma Louise Seal (August 6, 1891 – December 13, 1972) and Ray Stuckey Colvin (February 4, 1885 – December 17, 1959), a journalist from Illinois who was city editor of the Rocky Mountain News, and later the night managing editor of the Seattle Post-Intelligencer. The family moved to Seattle, where Donald graduated from Queen Anne High School in 1936.

In 1940, Colvin received his degree from the University of Washington. In 1940, he enrolled at the University of Washington School of Law, where he was a member of Phi Delta Phi and an editor of the Washington Law Review at the same time as Vern Countryman. He interrupted his law studies during World War II to serve as a sergeant in the United States Army, from February 1941 to February 1944. He returned to law school and, in 1945, was graduated first in his class. Colvin's clerkship at the U.S. Supreme Court for William O. Douglas during the 1945 Term followed Lucile Lomen, the first woman to clerk and a fellow graduate of Queen Anne High School.

In June 1947, he was admitted to the California bar. In the early 1950s, he was counsel to the New Jersey Central Railroad Company in New York City. He later moved to Beverly Hills, California, and practiced law in Los Angeles. In 1955, Colvin pleaded guilty in Spokane County Superior Court, State of Washington, to four charges of grand larceny by check for writing $400 worth of bad checks in February 1955.

In 1996, Colvin died in Los Angeles, California.

== See also ==
- List of law clerks for the fourth seat of the Supreme Court of the United States
