= Gatekeeper parent =

Parent who controls relationship between child and other parent

A gatekeeper parent, in legal setting, is a parent who appoints themself the power to decide what relationship is acceptable between the other parent and the child(ren). The term is broad and may include power dynamics within a marriage or may describe the behaviors of divorced or never married parents.

== Characteristics ==
Most "gatekeeping" situations are studied with consenting married couples who are first-time parents. Parenting situation studies using divorced couples and out-of-wedlock parenting relationships that show very similar or identical behavioral characteristics as married couples with children are usually studied as Parental Interference, Parental Alienation, Maternal Alienation, and Abuse by Proxy.

A gatekeeper parent exhibits the following behaviors:

- Criticizes the way other parent parents
- Creates unbending or unrealistic standards in order for the other parent to spend time with the children
- Demeans or undermines the other parent's efforts at being an authority figure in the child(ren's) lives
- Controls all the organizing, delegating, planning, and scheduling in the home
- Becomes reluctant to let go of some of the responsibility for caring for the family
- Needs a great deal of validation of their identity as a parent, both from the other parent and from outside the marriage or parenting relationship
- Believes in the traditional roles assigned to husbands and wives
- Views the other parent as a helper and not an equal when it comes to household chores and child-care responsibilities
- Asks the other parent for help, and then gives explicit directions on how to accomplish a task

Inside a marriage, the characteristics and symptoms of a gatekeeper may already be apparent, with one parent being relegated to second tier status and disenfranchised with regard to their parenting skills or their ability to practice and nurture their own set of skills. This lends itself to the dominant parent taking control of the household, and it causes severe resentment and sense of helplessness in the other parent's relationship with the children. In a post-divorce situation, the gatekeeping parent may limit contact between the other parent and the child(ren), abuse the child verbally and psychologically, or utilize derogatory remarks regarding the other parent, including threats in order to maintain control.

== Related conditions ==
It is yet to be determined or even studied as to whether parental gatekeeping is a different syndrome from parental interference and parental alienation or if the latter two are simply a more severe form of gatekeeping exacerbated by a high-conflict breakdown of the relationship between the two parents. Parental gatekeeping, along with parental interference and parental alienation are not recognized by the American Psychological Association as diagnosable "syndromes". Many mental health professionals have agreed that such terms are merely an attempt to explain a child's resistance to visitation with the father. High-conflict circumstances already visible in the marriage can lead to accusations of incompetence, neglect, or abuse of the children –usually by the mother against the father –once the relationship is being adjudicated in a divorce preceding. No current studies have been published to link the three syndromes and the American Psychological Association has not ruled or identified any of the three as recognized syndromes in any of its publications. Independent individual studies of all three are still in progress with findings to be published later.

== See also ==
- Parental alienation
- Parental alienation syndrome
