= Matthew D. Roberts =

American lawyer

- Born: Matthew David Roberts; July 11, 1962 (age 64); Queens, New York, U.S.
- Education: Harvard College; Harvard Law School
- Spouse: Edith Roberts (m. 1991)
- Children: 2

Matthew David Roberts is an American lawyer.

== Schooling ==
He graduated from Harvard College magna cum laude in 1984 and graduated first in his class from Harvard Law School in 1989.

== Career ==
Between graduating from college in 1984 and beginning law school in 1986, Roberts was a legislative aide for then-Congressman Charles Schumer. After law school, from 1989 to 1990, Roberts clerked for then-Judge Ruth Bader Ginsburg on the U.S. Court of Appeals for the District of Columbia Circuit. From 1990 to 1991, he clerked for Justice John Paul Stevens of the U.S. Supreme Court. From 1991 to 1993 he served as counsel to the Senate Banking Committee. He began to work for the Office of the Comptroller of the Currency in 1993 and in 1996 became Chief of Staff and Senior Deputy Comptroller of the Currency. In 1997 he joined the Office of the Solicitor General as an Assistant to the Solicitor General. He briefly left the Department of Justice to work at law firm O'Melveny & Myers but soon returned to his position as Assistant. As an Assistant, Roberts argued 30 cases before the Supreme Court. Between October 2000 and April 2010, Roberts was one of the ten lawyers who argued the greatest number of cases. Roberts left the Office of the Solicitor General in May 2011 to serve a detail in the Office of Legal Counsel, and joined the OLC in a permanent capacity as senior counsel in August 2013. In 2017, Roberts left OLC to serve as Special Counsel to the US Sentencing Commission. He retired in 2019. Roberts currently resides in Washington, D.C., with his wife, lawyer Edith Lampson Roberts. They have two children, Molly and Jacob Roberts.

== See also ==
- List of law clerks for the fourth seat of the Supreme Court of the United States
