= Teresa Wynn Roseborough =

American lawyer (born 1958)

Teresa Roseborough

Personal details
- Born: November 28, 1958 (age 67) Memphis, Tennessee, U.S.
- Party: Democratic
- Education: University of Virginia (BA); Boston University (MEd); University of North Carolina, Chapel Hill (JD)

Teresa Wynn Roseborough (born November 28, 1958) is an American lawyer, a former Deputy Assistant Attorney General during the Clinton administration and is the executive vice president and general counsel at The Home Depot. She used to be Deputy General Counsel at MetLife, where she at one point led a department of 62 associates and supervised MetLife's litigation activities worldwide.

== Early life and education ==
A native of Memphis, Tennessee, Roseborough earned a bachelor's degree from the University of Virginia in 1980 and a master's degree in education from Boston University in 1983. She then earned her J.D. degree with high honors from the University of North Carolina School of Law in 1986, where she also served as Editor-in-Chief of the North Carolina Law Review.

From 1986 until 1987, Roseborough worked as a law clerk for U.S. Court of Appeals Judge James Dickson Phillips, Jr., and from 1987 until 1988, Roseborough worked as a law clerk for U.S. Supreme Court Justice John Paul Stevens.

== Personal life ==
Roseborough married college sweetheart Joseph Roseborough in the university's chapel six days after graduating from the University of Virginia. In 1992 she gave birth to her only child, Courtney Grace Wynn Roseborough, who is now attending the University of Southern California. Her daughter and husband were responsible for the acquisition of the family's two great danes Harley and Blacky.

After five years of weekly commutes from Atlanta to New York, Roseborough again made Atlanta her permanent home in 2011.

== Professional career ==
After her clerkships, Roseborough worked for the law firm Sutherland Asbill & Brennan LLP as an associate for five years, according to a March 2, 1996 article in The Atlanta Journal-Constitution. Following public service in the Department of Justice's Office of Legal Counsel, she rejoined Sutherland in early 1996 as a partner, according to the same article. While at Sutherland, Ms. Roseborough’s practice focused on complex litigation matters at both the trial and appellate level, especially those involving constitutional law, class actions, telecommunications law, and government regulation. She participated in briefing and arguing numerous issues in state and federal courts around the country and in the U.S. Supreme Court. In 2003, Roseborough was chosen by American Lawyer magazine as one of the forty-five highest-performing members of the private bar under the age of forty-five in the magazine's cover story feature, "45 Under 45." Roseborough has served on the Executive Committees of the State Bar of Georgia’s Appellate Section, the ABA Council of Appellate Lawyers, and the U.S. Supreme Court Historical Society, which selected her in 2002 to re-argue the famous case of Gibbons v. Ogden (1824) before Justice Scalia, as a part of its National Heritage Lecture. She also has served as a member of the State Bar of Georgia’s Board of Bar Examiners.

== Executive branch experience ==
In 1994, Roseborough took a job with the U.S. Department of Justice as a Deputy Assistant Attorney General in the Office of Legal Counsel. "I was excited about the opportunity to work for a Democratic administration partly because I was so dismayed with what I saw happening to the legal regime under Republican administrations," Roseborough told The Atlanta Journal-Constitution in an article that appeared on August 21, 1994. Roseborough commuted to Washington from Atlanta under an arrangement signed off on by then-Attorney General Janet Reno.

== Finalist for an appeals court post ==
In early 1997, Roseborough was one of four finalists to a vacancy created in the U.S. Court of Appeals for the Eleventh Circuit by the decision by Judge Phyllis A. Kravitch to shift to senior status on December 31, 1996. President Clinton chose to instead nominate Frank M. Hull to the post. The other finalists were Leah Ward Sears and U.S. District Judge Clarence Cooper, according to a May 3, 1997 article in The Atlanta Journal-Constitution. The American Spectator reported in its November 1997 issue that Clinton had intended to nominate Roseborough to the seat, but that the then-chairman of the U.S. Senate Judiciary Committee, Sen. Orrin Hatch, had "balked" at that idea and had "suggested that a more moderate Clinton-appointed U.S. district judge, Frank Hull, would have clear sailing."

== 2000 presidential election ==
Roseborough served as one of the principal attorneys for Al Gore's presidential campaign in the litigation associated with the 2000 election, and she argued before the en banc Eleventh Circuit in the matters of Siegel v. LePore and Touchston v. McDermott on behalf of former Vice President Al Gore.

== Later work ==
While still a partner at Sutherland Asbill, Roseborough in late 2005 was identified as one of three finalists to become the dean of the University of North Carolina School of Law. The other finalists were Dave Douglas and Erwin Chemerinsky. Roseborough and Chemerinsky later withdrew as candidates, and the school selected John "Jack" Boger.

In 2006, Roseborough joined MetLife as its Chief Litigation Counsel. She also has served on the board of directors of the American Constitution Society. In addition to serving on the board of directors of the American Constitution Society, Roseborough has served as a member of the board of advisors for the Center for Civil Rights at the University of North Carolina and of the board of directors for the Lawyers’ Committee for Civil Rights.

On October 6, 2011, the Home Depot announced that it had hired Roseborough as the retailer's executive vice president, general counsel and corporate secretary. She reports to the company's CEO.

== Possible nomination to a federal appeals court and to the Supreme Court ==
In July 2007, Tom Goldstein of the legal blog SCOTUSblog speculated that Roseborough was a likely nominee to a federal appeals court in a Democratic presidential administration. Goldstein also identified Roseborough as a likely nominee to the U.S. Supreme Court by a Democratic president after a short stint on a federal appeals court. Shortly after President Obama's election, Roseborough was also mentioned by several prominent sources as a potential nominee to serve as U.S. Solicitor General, although that position was eventually filled by former Harvard Law School Dean Elena Kagan.

== See also ==
- List of law clerks for the fourth seat of the Supreme Court of the United States
