= Lucas A. Powe Jr. =

American lawyer

- Born: Oakland, California
- Education: Yale University; University of Washington
- Known for: First Amendment and broadcasting
- Scientific career
- Fields: Legal studies
- Workplaces: University of Texas Law School

Lucas A. Powe Jr. is an American lawyer who serves as the Anne Green Regents Chair in Law at the University of Texas at Austin. He is a Supreme Court historian of law.

== Early years and education ==
Powe's father was from Los Angeles. Powe Sr. attended the University of California, Berkeley, where he ran the mile in track, and in 1941 graduated from Boalt Hall School of Law. He married Nellie Sheafe and moved to be near her family in Oakland, California.

Powe was born in 1943 in Oakland, California. After the war, his parents moved to Seattle where he was raised. He majored in American history at Yale and graduated in 1965 and married Carolyn McKenny of Seattle, WA. He then went to the University of Washington School of Law where he graduated number one in his class and was Articles Editor of the Law Review. After two years teaching at the University of British Columbia, he was selected as Law Clerk to Supreme Court Justice William O. Douglas for the 1970 Term.

== Teaching and scholarship ==
In 1971, he joined the University of Texas faculty. He holds the Anne Green Regents Chair and teaches in the Law School and Government Department. He has been a visiting professor at the University of California Berkeley, the University of Connecticut, and Georgetown University Law Center.

Powe's scholarship has analyzed government regulation and the role of the Supreme Court in shaping society.

In Powe's 1987 book, American Broadcasting and the First Amendment, he urged deregulation of broadcast media, in contrast to the theory in favor of television regulation put forth by Lee C. Bollinger. A key difference between newspapers, on the one hand, and television stations, on the other, is that broadcasters are licensed by the Federal Communications Commission. No matter what politically sensitive stories a newspaper prints, the government cannot take away its presses. But a television station that offends the government can have its license revoked, a paradigm that can contribute to self-censorship, Powe argued.

In his 2000 book, The Warren Court and American Politics, Powe contended that the flaw in the tenure of Chief Justice Earl Warren was an attempt at social engineering at the expense of fidelity to the Constitution. One scholar described Powe's criticism: "It was a result-oriented Court, less concerned with legal reasoning than with the outcome. Powe writes that 'it is difficult to speak of an overriding jurisprudence apart from the results reached.' But what were the right results? What drove the Court? For Powe, the answer is straightforward: 'From the justices' points of view, the Court's prime role was to facilitate the policies ordained by the elected branches.'" The review in the American Historical Review concluded: “This book is a brilliant renewal of the public law tradition, and Powe deserves the thanks of legal scholars and political scientists – and, not least, historians of modern America.”

Powe's second book on the Court, The Supreme Court and the American Elite, 1789-2008 was described by Princeton's Keith Whittington as "the best one volume history of the Supreme Court ever published." An updated version was published as The Supreme Court and the American Elite, 1789-2020 and Whittington concluded “it remains the best one-volume history of the Supreme Court.”

His third book on the Court, "America’s Lone Star Constitution: How Supreme Court Cases from Texas Shape America" combines Texas history with that of the Court.

When Powe was selected by the alumni (or “Exes” as the University of Texas calls its alums) as one of the ten best teachers in the university in 2019, he became the only faculty member to hold that distinction along with the honor of having one of his books (The Warren Court and American Politics) selected by a faculty committee as the best book published by a Texas faculty member that year.

In Powe’s first oral argument before any court, he prevailed unanimously at the United States Supreme Court.

Powe was a member of the American Law Institute.

He was a reviewer for the History Book Club for almost thirty years.

== Selected publications ==
- American Broadcasting and the First Amendment (1987)
- The Fourth Estate and the Constitution: Freedom of the Press in America (1991)
- Regulating Broadcast Programming (1994)
- The Warren Court and American Politics (2000)
- The Supreme Court and the American Elite, 1789-2008 (2009)

== See also ==
- List of law clerks for the fourth seat of the Supreme Court of the United States
