= Parental alienation =

Theory of the psychological manipulation of a child

Parental alienation is a theorized process through which a child becomes estranged from one parent as the result of the psychological manipulation of another parent. The child's estrangement may manifest itself as fear, disrespect or hostility toward the distant parent, and may extend to additional relatives or parties. The child's estrangement is disproportionate to any acts or conduct attributable to the alienated parent. Parental alienation can occur in any family unit, but is claimed to occur most often within the context of family separation, particularly when legal proceedings are involved, although the participation of professionals such as lawyers, judges and psychologists may also contribute to conflict.

Proponents of the concept of parental alienation assert that it is primarily motivated by one parent's desire to exclude the other parent from their child's life. Some assert that parental alienation should be diagnosable in children as a mental disorder. Some propose that parental alienation be recognized as a form of child abuse or family violence. They assert that parental alienation creates stress on the alienated parent and the child, and significantly increases the child's lifetime risk of mental illness.

Parental alienation remains controversial both within the psychological community and the legal system. The psychological community has not accepted parental alienation as a diagnosable mental condition. Critics note that alienating behaviors are common in high-conflict family situations such as child custody proceedings, but that the estrangement of a child from a parent remains rare. They assert that the research performed to date does not support the theory that parental alienation results in the harm described by proponents of the concept. They also express concern that a parent who has caused a child to become estranged, for example through acts of domestic violence or child abuse, may claim to be the victim of parental alienation to convince a court that the child's justified response to the abuse is the result of the other parent's misconduct and to potentially gain custody of the child. No diagnostic criteria have been established for parental alienation, and proposals made to date have not been established as reliable. No program of treatment has been demonstrated to be safe or valid, and proponents of parental alienation theory agree that more research into treatment is necessary.

The theory of parental alienation has been asserted within legal proceedings as a basis for awarding custody to a parent who alleges estrangement, or to modify custody in favor of that parent. Courts have generally rejected parental alienation as a valid scientific theory, but some courts have allowed the concept to be argued as relevant to the determination of the child's best interests when making a custody determination. Legal professionals recognize that alienating behaviors are common in child custody cases, but are cautious about accepting the concept of parental alienation.

== Characteristics ==
Parental alienation describes the breakdown of the relationship between a child and one of the child's parents when there is no valid justification for that breakdown. When parental alienation is found to exist between a parent and child, the alienation is attributed to inappropriate actions and behavior by the other parent.

Parental alienation falls within the spectrum of family estrangement, a term that describes when family members become alienated from each other without regard to cause. As estrangement may occur between a parent and child for other reasons, it is possible to discuss alienation in terms of a child's having a preferred and a nonpreferred parent without implying that a child's avoidance of one parent is due to parental alienation.

The concept of parental alienation is normally raised only in contexts in which the child's alienation from the parent is alleged to be unwarranted. Under that conception, estrangement from a parent falls into one of two broad categories:

- Justified parental estrangement, that results from such factors as the rejected parent's harmful or abusive behavior, substance abuse, neglect, or abandonment.
- Parental alienation, in which one parent engages in actions that cause the child to strongly ally with that parent and reject the other without legitimate justification. The rejected parent may contribute to the estrangement in some manner, but the key concept is that the rejection by the child is out of proportion to anything that the rejected parent has done.

Justified parental estrangement is an understandable refusal by a child to see a parent, while parental alienation lacks justifiable reason, although there is no consensus regarding how to differentiate one from the other. There is no established means of assessing whether a child's feelings toward a parent are "irrational" or "without legitimate basis", complicating any effort to attribute a child's attitudes toward a parent to parental alienation.

== Theories ==
Alienating behaviors are often demonstrated by both parents in high-conflict divorce and child custody cases, but do not ordinarily result in alienation of a child from a parent and may backfire against the parent who engages in alienating behavior. Theories of parental alienation should explain how the relationship between the child and the rejected parent deteriorates, why under similar circumstances alienation may occur in one family but not another, and the relationship between alienating behaviors and the severity of a child’s alienation from a parent.

In situations where a child avoids one parent and strongly prefers the other, the only behaviors that can be observed are avoidance and preference. Alienation by one parent thus cannot be directly measured, and is instead inferred from the child's behavior. Some researchers thus use "preferred" rather than "alienating" parent and "non-preferred" rather than "alienated", "rejected", or "targeted" parent.

Although a number of theories have been proposed, there is no generally accepted theory of parental alienation, either as to its cause or to the motivation of the allegedly alienating parent. One theory of motivation suggests that parental alienation may occur when divorce triggers reenactment of a parent's childhood feelings of inadequacy or abandonment, and causes alienating parents to reenact psychological processes experienced during their own childhood. However, that theory does not explain alleged parental alienation that may occur in other contexts, nor in cases where there is no evidence of a parent's childhood trauma. Another theory of motivation posits that alienation is a form of harmful parenting by a parent who suffers from a personality disorder, specifically borderline personality disorder or narcissistic personality disorder. A divorce, breakup of a relationship or similarly difficult experience triggers feelings of inadequacy or abandonment that cause that parent to decompensate into persecutorial delusions, and to project their fears onto the other parent. However, parental alienation is frequently alleged in cases where neither parent has been diagnosed with a personality disorder.

== Consequences ==
Studies suggest that independent of other marital issues, acts of parental alienation may be harmful to children. While not all adults who experience acts of parental alienation during childhood report negative consequences, many report outcomes that they attribute to parental alienation, including low self-esteem, addiction and substance abuse, trust issues, and relationship problems. For example, a retrospective study of adults found that independent of damage of a child's relationship with the other parent, perceived experiences with parental alienation during childhood correlate in adulthood with lower self-sufficiency, lower self-esteem, higher rates of major depressive disorder, and insecure attachment styles. Similarly, parents who describe themselves as having experienced visitation sabotage and parental alienation report depression and reduced emotional well-being.

Assessment of the impact of parental alienation within the context of legal proceedings, such as child custody litigation, is complicated by the participation of other professionals, including psychologists, lawyers and judges, whose actions and decisions may negatively affect family relationships. Although alienating behaviors by parents are common in high-conflict divorces, most children do not become alienated from a parent as a result of that behavior.

Some mental health professionals argue that severe parental alienation should be established as a form of emotional abuse and domestic violence. However, controversy persists as to whether parental alienation should be treated as a form of child abuse or family violence.

== Diagnosis ==
No instrument or measure has been demonstrated to be valid or reliable in the assessment of parental alienation, or to diagnose parental alienation from any list of child behaviors. The claim that any individual behavior or cluster of behaviors demonstrates that the preferred parent has caused the child's avoidance is not based on empirical work and as an inference is the result of a problem of critical thinking called affirming the consequent. No diagnostic criteria have been proposed that can be applied to determine if a child's feelings toward a parent are irrational or disproportionate to the actions or behavior of the alienated parent. The absence of a valid and reliable assessment measure also means that it is difficult to evaluate whether parental alienation treatments are effective

Although it has been proposed that parental alienation can be diagnosed in a child who displays some or all of a set of behaviors, the proposed criteria have not been studied empirically, and have not been demonstrated to occur more often in children who avoid one parent after high-conflict divorce than they do in children matched for age who are experiencing different stressors and do not have a strong preference for one parent. It is also necessary to diagnose the whole family system in order to avoid misattributing a child's estrangement to the actions of a parent. Further, symptoms that are claimed to suggest parental alienation may occur in a high-conflict divorce even without indoctrination by the favored parent, rendering them problematic for identification of improper parenting.

Critics of this approach to diagnosis assert that if the behaviors can occur without an alienating parent, they cannot of themselves be used to determine if a child is demonstrating symptoms from parental alienation. The proposed list of behaviors has also been criticized as vague and subjective. For example, a child's claim to have independently formulated opinions of a rejected parent may be interpreted as "independent-thinker phenomenon", which is proposed as evidence of parental alienation, such that any statement a child makes about parental influence or lack thereof can be interpreted as confirmation of parental alienation.

== Treatment ==
There is no generally recognized treatment protocol for parental alienation. A number of treatment models have been created for children deemed to show parental alienation, with some intensive models carried out after custody of the children has been transferred to the targeted parent. Five treatment programs were evaluated in terms of the levels of evidence provided by the empirical research said to support them. None were supported by research that met standards required for evidence-based treatments. Instead, they were at the third level of evidence, often called “promising”, as they involved before-and-after assessment of nonpreferred parents’ opinions rather than randomized controlled trials or clinical controlled trials using standardized assessments. Reports of some young adults who have been through one of these treatments suggest that as well as lacking an adequate evidence basis, the treatments may be either directly or indirectly harmful to children and adolescents.

One form of reconciliation therapy, described by its proponents as family reunification therapy, involves court-ordered removal of children from their preferred parent and the requirement that they engage in intensive programs with the rejected parent. The safety and effectiveness of family reconciliation therapy, the scientific validity of that therapy, and the question of whether it may properly be considered by a court, are in dispute. Due to its unproven nature, this form of therapy has been criticized as "quack therapy". In order to avoid regulations and oversight that apply to psychological and medical treatment, these programs are often billed as educational or psycho-educational. These programs tend also to be very expensive. Some children who have been compelled to participate in family reunification therapy have reported that they were forced to deny their truthful complaints about the parent that was alleged to be alienated. A recent program evaluation of a four-day intervention called "Turning Point for Families" found preliminary evidence that the program could improve family relationships in situations where a court finds alienation.

== Legal issues ==
Parental alienation concepts have been used to argue for child custody changes when children resist contact with a non-preferred parent. The argument generally involves the request for a court order giving full custody to the nonpreferred parent and denying contact to the preferred parent. The child may also be ordered into a treatment program to facilitate reunification with the nonpreferred parent. The rationale of this argument is that the attitude and actions of children who reject a parent without clear evidence of abuse reflects mental illness. If that belief is correct then the child's mental disorder may be attributed to the actions of the preferred parent and, as the actions have harmed the child, those actions can be defined as abusive. Once an allegation of parental alienation is interpreted as abuse by a parent, that interpretation provides a strong argument against custody of or even contact with that parent. This line of argument, however, ignores other possible factors, such as the effect on a child of poor parenting skills of the nonpreferred parent or the influence of one or both parents’ new romantic partners, and depends on inferences about the behavior of the preferred parent rather than direct evidence of inappropriate parenting.

A number of articles in professional journals have presented critiques of the manner in which parental alienation advocates have construed children's avoidance of one divorced or separated parent and strong preference for the other parent. Key among their concerns is that advocates of parental alienation concepts have presented a highly simplified explanation of visitation and contact resistance or refusal by children of couples in high-conflict divorces. As multiple factors are generally involved in human behavior, they assert that without direct evidence it is not appropriate to infer manipulation or exploitation by one parent as the cause of a child's preference for one parent over the other. Another concern is that there is a lack of evidentiary support for the concept of parental alienation, as proponents of this theory have failed to meet standards for evidence-based treatment and have never produced empirical support for claimed symptoms of alienation such as "black and white thinking". The behavioral signs described as indicative of parental alienation are subjective and common, and there is no clinically reliable basis to assert that a child demonstrating those behaviors has experienced parental alienation.

A particularly problematic aspect of the use of parental alienation concepts in child custody decisions is the possible association of allegations of alienating behavior by the preferred parent with allegations of domestic violence by the nonpreferred parent. As allegations of parental alienation can lead to court-ordered custody changes giving the nonpreferred parent full custody, and often including restraining orders against contact with the preferred parent, it becomes possible for a finding of parental alienation to cause children to be placed in the custody of a physically or sexually abusive parent.

Although courts have long been concerned with the issue of parental estrangement, and how to safely reunite children with their estranged parents, research into the cause of parental estrangement frequently involves issues of selection bias, lack of operationalization, small sample size, misclassification, and other methodological concerns. There remain significant questions about whether there is sufficient evidence to accurately support claims about the cause, prevalence and consequence of parental estrangement, or appropriate interventions in cases where estrangement exists. Sound research in this area remains in its early stages, and further research is required that is designed to reduce the risk of misclassificaiton, produce findings that are reliable, and to identify appropriate interventions.

=== Worldwide ===
==== Brazil ====
In August 2010 Brazil passed the first national legislation prohibiting parental alienation. Lei No. 12.318 which it defines "as the interference with the psychological formation of a child or adolescent that promotes repudiation of a parent or damage to the establishment or maintenance of ties with a parent, when such an act is practiced by a parent, grandparent, those who have the child or adolescent under their authority, custody, or supervision." A judge who finds that parental alienation has occurred may issue a warning, may modify the custody arrangement in favor of the alienated parent, may order counseling, or may place the alienated child in an interim residence. Brazil’s Congress has advanced efforts to repeal the country’s Parental Alienation Law, with the Constitution and Justice Committee approving a bill to revoke it and send it to the Senate for further consideration.

==== England ====
In England, the Children and Family Court Advisory and Support Service (Cafcass) was formed to promote the welfare of children and families involved family court cases. Cafcass recognizes the possibility of parental alienating behaviours in family separation cases.

==== Israel ====
In Israel, parental alienation is known as "nikur hori", and some courts are receptive to efforts to attempt to reunify children who have been estranged or alienated from a parent, although concerns remain that there is little empirical evidence to support the concept of parental alienation. In order to expedite the resolution of custody cases and disputes, some jurisdictions in Israel have implemented pilot projects for cases involving child custody and enforcement of visitation orders.

==== Mexico ====
In the former Federal District of Mexico, an area that is officially equivalent to Mexico City, 323 Septimus of the Civil Code prohibited a family member from transforming the conscience of a minor so as to prevent, hinder or interfere with the minor's relationship with one of the minor's parents. If a court found that such acts had occurred and were of mild or moderate nature, and that the person responsible for the alienation was the father, the court was required to transfer custody to the other parent. If the court found that the degree of parental alienation attributable to the father was severe, all contact with the father of the child was required to be suspended, and the child was required to receive counseling. This provision was repealed by the Legislative Assembly of Mexico City in 2007 and again, after its reenactment, in 2017.

==== Republic of Ireland ====
Although Ireland does not have legislation on parental alienation, in 2020, for the first time in a child access case a judge described a parent's actions as "parental alienation". During 2019 to 2021 thirty of the thirty-one Irish councils have asked the government to recognise and address parental alienation. In 2021 the Irish Government included international parental alienation research and public consultation in its Justice Action Plan.

==== Spain ====
Article 11.3 of Spain's Organic Law, on the comprehensive protection of children and adolescents against violence, provides that public authorities must prevent consideration of theoretical approaches or criteria lacking scientific support that presume adult interference or manipulation, including parental alienation syndrome. The law also states that measures promoting positive parenting must not be used in parental conflict, separation, or divorce for other purposes, including imposing non-agreed joint custody, and must not be linked to scientifically unsupported concepts such as parental alienation syndrome. In May 2026, the Spanish Council of Ministers approved a draft reform of the law that would expressly prohibit the use of parental alienation syndrome and its reformulations in judicial and administrative proceedings. The proposal requires further legislative approval before taking effect.

==== United States ====
Although all states have custody laws that require courts to consider how parents' actions affect the best interests of their children, no federal or state laws that incorporate the concept of parental alienation have been passed. Some courts recognize parental alienation as a serious issue with potential long-term effects and serious outcomes for the child. Other jurisdictions may suspend child support in cases where parental alienation occurs. For example, in a New York case in which the father was prevented from seeing his son by the child's mother through a "pattern of alienation", child support was suspended. Some United States courts have tried to address the issue through mandated reunification therapy.

Due to the nature of allegations of parental alienation, many courts require that a qualified expert witness testify in support of allegations of parental alienation or in association with any allegation that a parent has a mental health disorder.

An examination of parental alienation U.S. custody decisions, based upon a review of appellate cases, found that courts are significantly more skeptical of child physical and sexual abuse allegations made by mothers as compared to similar claims made by fathers, rendering parental alienation a powerful defense for fathers accused of abuse but not for mothers. A subsequent, smaller study disputed that conclusion.

== History ==
The term parental alienation is derived from parental alienation syndrome, a term introduced by Richard Gardner in 1985 to describe a set of behaviors that he had observed in children exposed to family separation or divorce whereby children rejected or showed what he interpreted as unwarranted negative feelings towards one of their parents.

The idea that children may be turned against one of their parents, or may reject a parent unjustifiably during family breakdown, has been recognized for centuries. The position that many family estrangements result from such a process of psychological manipulation, undue influence or interference by a third party (rather than from genuine interactions between the estranged parties themselves) is less well-recognized.

=== Parental alienation syndrome ===
Parental alienation syndrome (PAS) was proposed by child psychiatrist Richard Gardner as a means of diagnosing parental alienation within a family by virtue of identifying a cluster of symptoms that he hypothesized would only co-exist if a parent were engaged in alienating behavior. This theory involved looking for a set of psychological symptoms in a child and proposing PAS as a basis for concluding that those symptoms were caused by harmful parenting practices.

No mental health organizations recognized parental alienation syndrome. In 2008, the American Psychological Association noted that there is a lack of data to support the concept of parental alienation syndrome, but took no official position on the syndrome. A 2009 survey of mental health and legal professionals found broad skepticism of the concept of parental alienation syndrome, and caution in relation to the concept of parental alienation.

In 2012, in anticipation of the release of the DSM-5, the fifth version of the Diagnostic and Statistical Manual of Mental Disorders, an argument was made for the inclusion of PAS in the DSM-5 as a diagnosis related to parental alienation. The argument was based upon the position that parental alienation and a variety of other descriptions of behaviors represent the underlying concept of parental alienation disorder. Despite lobbying by proponents, the proposal was rejected in December 2012.

With the exclusion of PAS from the DSM-V, some advocates for the recognition of parental alienation as a diagnosable condition have argued that elements of parental alienation are covered in the DSM-5 under the concept of "Other Conditions That May Be a Focus of Clinical Attention", specifically, "Child Affected by Parental Relationship Distress". Those advocates assert that children who are exposed to intimate partner distress between their parents may develop psychological symptoms as a result of that exposure. However, relational issues are not mental disorders or diagnoses, but are instead considered to be problems that may be relevant for diagnosis or treatment of a diagnosable disorder. While parent-child estrangement can serve as an example of a relational problem such as "Child Affected by Parental Relationship Distress", the observation of a relational issue is not a diagnosis.

=== Recognition of parental alienation ===
As the psychological and psychiatric communities did not accept the concept of a "syndrome", the term "parental alienation" was advanced in the 1990s as a possible explanation of a child's behavior independent of a psychological or psychiatric diagnosis. Among theories of parental alienation that have been proposed, psychologists have argued that the term parental alienation may be used in a manner synonymous with the original formulation of parental alienation syndrome, with diagnosis based upon signs observable in children, that it may be used to describe the process or tactics by which a child becomes alienated from a parent, or to describe the outcomes for parents and others who have experienced unwarranted rejection by a child.

Some empirical research has been performed, though the quality of the studies vary widely and research in the area is still developing. One complicating factor for research is that high numbers of parents involved in high conflict custody disputes engage in alienating or indoctrinating behaviors, but only a small proportion children become alienated.

In an informal survey at the Association of Family and Conciliation Courts in 2010, 98% of the 300 respondents agreed with the question, "Do you think that some children are manipulated by one parent to irrationally and unjustifiably reject the other parent?". Survey participants were divided as to whether a rejected parent partially blame when a child becomes alienated from a parent and the other parent is exhibiting alienating behaviors, and by a significant margin rejected the inclusion of parental alienation in the DSM.

United States courts have broadly rejected parental alienation syndrome as a concept that may be presented in a child custody case, but it remains possible to argue within child custody litigation that parental alienation has occurred and to demonstrate how a parent's alienating behaviors should be considered by a court when evaluating a custody case. Behaviors that result in parental alienation may reflect other mental health disorders, both on the part of the alienating parent and the rejected parent that, if proved, remain relevant to a custody determination. The behavior of the alienated child may also be a relevant factor. However, single-factor explanations for a child's estrangement from a parent have not proved valid, and multi-factor models are more complex and difficult to argue in a court setting.

== Activism ==
In late 2005, a Canadian activist named Sarvy Emo proposed that March 28 be designated Parental Alienation Awareness Day. The proposed date was later modified to April 25. The date has received some level of recognition, such as a 2006 proclamation by the Governor of Georgia recognizing April 25 as Parental Alienation Awareness Day, and its unofficial recognition by the Governor of Nevada in 2007.

In 2025, on Parental Alienation Awareness Day, the organization PAPA (People Against Parental Alienation) planned a show of support for those impacted by parental alienation, by illuminating the Spinnaker Tower, Portsmouth in teal green.

There are also organizations that actively oppose the use of the concept of parental alienation and the making of custody decisions based on this belief system. For example, the Center for Judicial Excellence argues against the use of the parental alienation argument in custody cases. In 2019 the American Professional Society on Abuse of Children (APSAC) posted on its website a recommendation against using the parental alienation concept or claiming that when a child rejects a parent, emotional abuse by the preferred parent has taken place. The Institute on Violence, Abuse, and Trauma (IVAT) devoted a three-hour session at its September 2019 meeting to arguments opposing the use of parental alienation concepts and related claims.

== See also ==
- Child abuse
- Child custody
- Gatekeeper parent
- Parental alienation syndrome
- Parentification
- Richard Warshak
- Social rejection
