= Richard Warshak =

American psychologist (born 1949)

- Born: 1949 (age 76–77)
- Education: Ph.D., Clinical psychology
- Alma mater: University of Texas Southwestern Medical Center
- Known for: Child custody, Shared parenting, Parental alienation
- Scientific career
- Workplaces: University of Texas Southwestern Medical Center
- Thesis: The Effects of Father Custody and Mother Custody on Children's Personality Development (1978)

Richard A. Warshak (born December 18, 1949) is an American clinical and research psychologist and author. He is best known for his research and advocacy in the areas of child custody, shared parenting, and claims of parental alienation in the context of divorce. Warshak has written two books, The Custody Revolution, and Divorce Poison: Protecting the Parent-Child Bond From a Vindictive Ex, and the updated edition, Divorce Poison: How to Protect Your Family from Bad-mouthing and Brainwashing.

== Education ==
Warshak graduated from Brooklyn's Midwood High School in 1966 and received his B.S. degree from Cornell University in 1971. Warshak received his Ph.D. in clinical psychology from the University of Texas Southwestern Medical Center in 1978 where he stayed to eventually become Clinical Professor of Psychology in the Department of Psychiatry.

== Research ==
Warshak's research has focused on issues relating to child custody. His doctoral dissertation, The Effects of Father Custody and Mother Custody on Children's Personality Development, compared children growing up in father-custody homes to children growing up in mother-custody homes. He later collaborated with John Santrock on the Texas Custody Research Project on a series of studies on the effects of different custody dispositions and stepfamilies.

Warshak's subsequent research in this area has focused on remarriage, relocation, parenting plans for young children, the American Law Institute's approximation rule and children's preferences in custody disputes.

=== Parental alienation ===
In 2003, Warshak published an article that discussed the controversy about whether a child's alienation from a parent could be diagnosed as a syndrome and presented arguments both for and against the use of the term parental alienation syndrome. His article about a program he helped develop, Family Bridges: Using Insights from Social Science to Reconnect Parents and Alienated Children, led to a 2010 special issue of the Family Court Review dedicated to the controversy surrounding claims of parental alienation.

Warshak takes the position that a child's alienation from a parent may be the result of many causes, including the behavior of the rejected parent. Warshak asserts that courts must rapidly and effectively enforce orders related to children's contact with both parents.

Warshak asserts that the emotional and financial costs of severe alienation and the difficulties in repairing that damage make it important to identify children who are at risk and to educate judges. His educational video, Welcome Back, Pluto: Understanding, Preventing, and Overcoming Parental Alienation, is directed at children, teens, and young adults who are alienated or at risk for becoming alienated.

=== Report on shared parenting ===
In 2014 Warshak's article Social Science and Parenting Plans for Young Children: A Consensus Report, was published by the American Psychological Association in the journal Psychology, Public Policy, and Law. The article summarized research on different child custody arrangements after divorce, recommending shared parenting in the vast majority of cases. Warshak's conclusions were endorsed by 110 other researchers and practitioners, many of whom held prominent academic and research positions.

== Positions and roles ==
Warshak was a founding member and past president of the Dallas Society for Psychoanalytic Psychology (DSPP) and was the founding editor of the DSPP Bulletin.

== Media ==
Warshak has written several op-ed columns published in U.S. newspapers and online publications. He was one of the five initial contributors to the Child and Family Blog co-sponsored by Princeton University, Brookings Institution, University of Cambridge, and the Jacobs Foundation.

Warshak has been interviewed on television programs, including ABC 20/20, and the PBS documentary TV Special, Kids & Divorce: For Better or Worse.. His work and opinions have been discussed in newspaper and magazine articles.

== Controversy ==
Warshak helped develop the Family Bridges workshop programs for children and rejected parents. This type of program is controversial due to questions as to whether children should be forced to live with the rejected parent or be required to participate in any program or therapy predicated upon the belief that their rejection of a parent is unreasonable, or whether such mandates may be beneficial.

Some children who participated programs associated with Warshak have complained about the experience. According to a 2018 peer-reviewed study authored by Warshak, most workshop leaders, parents and children in the Family Bridges program reported positive experiences. Warshak's conclusions have been called into question based upon his not being a neutral observer, the study's lack of follow-up, his claimed evidentiary basis for the Family Bridges program, and his reliance upon before-and-after studies instead of controlled studies.

== Selected publications ==
=== Books ===
- The Custody Revolution. (1992). NY: Simon & Schuster.
- Divorce Poison: Protecting the Parent-Child Bond from a Vindictive Ex. (2002). NY: HarperCollins. Hardcover, paperback, Kindle and other e-book editions.
- Divorce Poison: How to Protect the Parent-Child Bond from Bad-mouthing and Brainwashing. (2010). NY: HarperCollins.

=== Selected articles ===
- Santrock, J. W. & Warshak, R. A. (1979). Father custody and social development in boys and girls. Journal of Social Issues, 35 (4), 112–125.
- Santrock, J. W., Warshak, R. A. et al. (1982). Children's and parents’ observed social behavior in stepfather families. Child Development, 53 (2), 472–480.
- Warshak, R. A. (1986). Father-custody and child development: A review and analysis of psychological research. Behavioral Sciences & the Law, 4, 185–202.
- Warshak, R. A. (2000). Social Science and Children's Best Interests in Relocation Cases: Burgess Revisited. Family Law Quarterly, 34 (1), 83–113.
- Warshak, R. A. (2003). Bringing Sense to Parental Alienation: a Look at the Disputes and the Evidence. Family Law Quarterly, 37, 273–301.
- Warshak, R. A. (2011). Parenting by the Clock: The Best Interests of the Child Standard, Judicial Discretion, and The American Law Institute's "Approximation Rule." University of Baltimore Law Review, 41 (1), 83-163.
- Warshak, R. A. (2013). In a Land Far, Far Away: Assessing Children’s Best Interests in International Relocation Cases. Journal of Child Custody, 10, 295-324.
- Warshak, R. A., with the endorsement of 110 researchers and practitioners listed in the Appendix. (2014). Social Science and Parenting Plans for Young Children: A Consensus Report. Psychology, Public Policy, and Law, 20, 46-67.
- Warshak, R. A. (2015). Parental Alienation: Overview, Intervention, and Practice Tips. Journal of the American Academy of Matrimonial Lawyers, 27, in press.
- Warshak, R. A. (2015). Ten Parental Alienation Fallacies that Compromise Decisions in Court and in Therapy. Professional Psychology: Research and Practice, 46 (4),235-249.
- Warshak, R.A. (2018) Night Shifts: Revisiting Blanket Restrictions on Children's Overnights with Separated Parents, Journal of Divorce & Remarriage, 59, 282–323.
- Warshak, R.A. (2019) When Evaluators Get It Wrong: False Positive IDs and Parental Alienation, Psychology, Public Policy & Law, on line first October, 2019.

=== Selected Book chapters ===
- Warshak, R. A. (2006). Social Science and Parental Alienation: Examining the Disputes and the Evidence. In R. A. Gardner, R. Sauber, and D. Lorandos (Eds.), The International Handbook of Parental Alienation Syndrome: Conceptual, Clinical and Legal Considerations. Springfield, IL: Charles C. Thomas Publisher, LTD.
- Warshak, R. A. (2013). Severe Cases of Parental Alienation. In D. Lorandos, R. Sauber, and W. Bernet (Eds.), Parental Alienation: Handbook for Mental Health and Legal Professionals. Springfield, IL: Charles C. Thomas Publisher, LTD.
