= Queen Anne High School, Seattle =

Building in Seattle, Washington, U.S.

- Queen Anne High School
- U.S. National Register of Historic Places
- Seattle Landmark
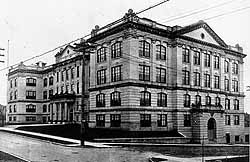
- Queen Anne High School, 1909 or 1910

- Location within Washington (state) Location within the United States
- Location: 215 Galer St. Seattle, Washington, United States
- Coordinates: 47°37′55″N 122°21′07″W
- Architect: James Stephen
- Architectural style: Classical Revival
- NRHP reference No.: 85002916

Significant dates
- Added to NRHP: November 21, 1985
- Designated SEATL: May 6, 1985

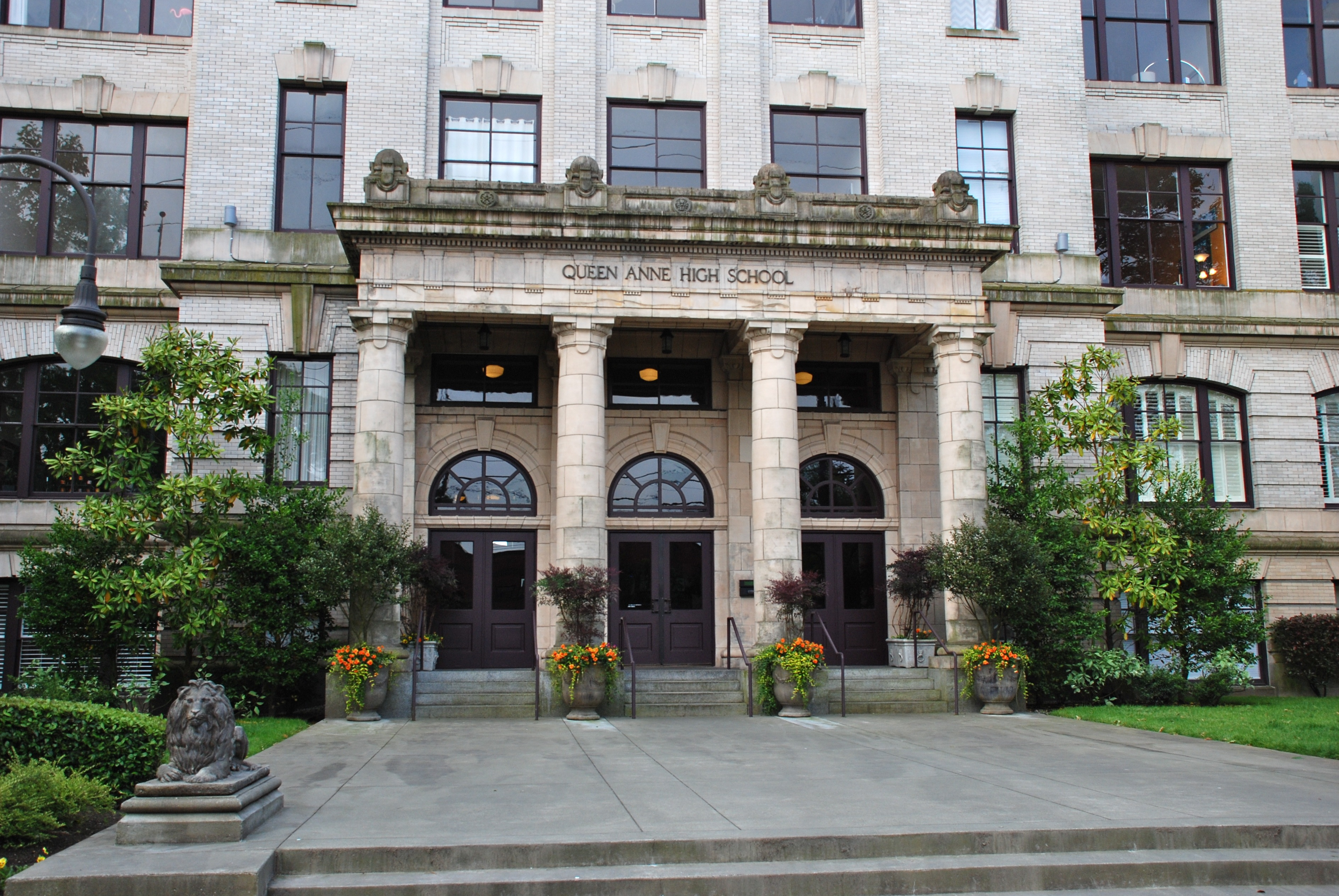
The former high school building (now in use for condominium units) in 2014

Queen Anne High School (1909–1981) was a Seattle Public Schools high school on Galer Street atop Queen Anne Hill in Seattle, Washington, United States. The building was converted to condominium apartments in 2007.

The school was built in 1908 with additions in 1929 and 1955, and was listed on the National Register of Historic Places in 1985. It is also an official City of Seattle landmark.

The school closed in 1981 due to decreasing enrollment. Students in the school's attendance area transferred to various high schools in the district. The school facility underwent renovation and adaptive reuse to become a residential apartment building in 1986, with 137 apartments. In 2006 the residential apartments underwent another renovation and converted to condominium units.

== Notable alumni ==
- Steve Anderson - silver medalist at the 1928 Summer Olympics in the 110-meter hurdles. Tied the world record in the 120-yard hurdles.
- Rex Buren Beisel – Aviation engineer
- Howard Brandt, Class of 1958 – physicist
- Walter Houser Brattain, 1956 Nobel Prize in Physics; attended for one year.
- Arthur C. Brooks, Class of 1981 – social scientist and president of the American Enterprise Institute
- Tory Bruno, Class of 1979 - aerospace executive and rocket scientist. CEO of United Launch Alliance
- John Cherberg, Class of 1929 — Washington Huskies football player and head coach. 13th Lieutenant Governor of Washington.
- Peter W. Chiarelli, Class of 1968 – Vice Chief of Staff of the United States Army (2008–2012)
- Donald R. Colvin, Class of 1936 – law clerk to Justice William O. Douglas, U.S. Supreme Court
- Kathi Goertzen, Class of 1976 – television reporter and news anchor
- Leslie Groves, Class of 1914 – Lieutenant General, oversaw the construction of the Pentagon, directed the Manhattan Project
- Dwight Gustafson, Class of 1948 – composer, music educator.
- Bob Houbregs, Class of 1949 – member, Naismith Basketball Hall of Fame
- L. Ron Hubbard – founded the Church of Scientology
- Helmi Juvonen, Class of 1922 - Artist (Northwest School)
- Hank Ketcham, Class of 1937 – creator of Dennis the Menace
- Gary Kildall, Class of 1960 - was an American computer scientist and creator of CP/M, the first standard operating system for personal computers
- Lucile Lomen, Class of 1937 – first woman law clerk at U.S. Supreme Court
- Peter Norton, Class of 1961 – American computer guru / philanthropist
- Joel Pritchard, Class of 1944 – American businessman and politician, served in U.S. House of Representatives, the 14th Lieutenant Governor of Washington, and co-inventor of pickleball
- Mary Randlett, – attended but did not graduate, before becoming a photographer of the Northwest School
- Harold Weeks, – jazz composer
- Kirby Wilbur - radio personality and conservative political activist
