= Lucile Lomen =

American lawyer (1920–1996)

- Born: August 21, 1920; Nome, Alaska
- Died: June 21, 1996 (aged 75); Seattle, Washington
- Other names: Lucy, Lu
- Education: Whitman College, B.A., University of Washington School of Law, LL.B.
- Occupation: Lawyer
- Known for: First woman law clerk at the U.S. Supreme Court

Helen Lucile Lomen (August 21, 1920 – June 21, 1996) was the first woman to serve as a law clerk for a Supreme Court justice.

== Early life and education ==
Lomen was born in Nome, Alaska in 1920. Her grandfather, Gudbrand J. Lomen, served as mayor of Nome and also as a district judge, inspiring her early interest in a legal career. Her family later moved to Seattle, where she graduated from Queen Anne High School in 1937. She then attended Whitman College, from which she graduated cum laude and Phi Beta Kappa in 1941. Lomen went to law school at the University of Washington, where she graduated first in her class and was an editor on the law review. She also worked thirty hours per week in the office of Dean Judson F. Falknor, whose work as a compliance commissioner on the War Production Board required his part-time student secretary to type numerous legal memoranda.

== Clerkship ==
Upon graduation, Lomen went to Washington, D.C. to clerk for Supreme Court Justice William O. Douglas (himself a Whitman alum) for the 1944–1945 term. In 1944, the Justice requested potential clerk names from Dean Falknor, who had recommended the hiring of four previous Douglas clerks. Initially, the Dean responded that he had no one to recommend, due to the number of recent male graduates in military service during World War II. Justice Douglas responded, "When you say that you have 'no available graduates’ whom you could recommend for appointment as my clerk, do you include women? It is possible that I may decide to take one if I can find one who is absolutely first-rate." The Dean then recommended Lomen, also sending the Justice a copy of her law review article. Lomen was also recommended to Douglas by Chester Maxey, her undergraduate adviser at Whitman, and by Douglas’s former clerk, Vern Countryman.

Lomen was the first female clerk at the United States Supreme Court, and the only one for more than two decades. Margaret J. Corcoran became the second female Supreme Court law clerk in 1966.

== Later life and death ==
After her time at the Supreme Court, Lomen turned down a position in the U.S. Department of Justice in favor of her home state of Washington as assistant attorney general, where she served for three years. She went on to a 35-year career in multiple positions for General Electric including counsel for corporate affairs. She retired in 1983 and died at the age of 75 in 1996.

== See also ==
- List of law clerks for the fourth seat of the Supreme Court of the United States
