= Inter-American =

Inter-American can refer to:

- Inter-American Biodiversity Information Network
- Inter-American Conference
- Inter-American Commission on Human Rights
- Inter-American Copyright Union
- Inter-American Court of Human Rights
- Inter-American Defense Board
  - Inter-American Defense Board Medal
- Inter-American Defense College
- Inter-American Democratic Charter
- Inter-American Development Bank
- Inter-American Division of Seventh-day Adventists
- Inter-American Economic Council
- Inter-American Foundation
- Inter-American Highway
- Inter-American Institute for Global Change Research
- Inter-American Institute of Human Rights
- Inter-American Magnet School
- Inter-American League
- Inter American Press Association
- Inter American Regional Organisation of Workers, now Trade Union Confederation of the Americas
- Inter-American Telecommunication Commission
- Inter-American Treaty of Reciprocal Assistance
- Inter-American University of Puerto Rico
- Inter-American (train)
- Inter-American Conventions:
  - Inter-American Convention Against Corruption
  - Inter-American Convention Against Racism and All Forms of Discrimination and Intolerance
  - Inter-American Convention Against Terrorism
  - Inter-American Convention against the Illicit Manufacturing of and Trafficking in Firearms, Ammunition, Explosives and Other Related Materials
  - Inter-American Convention on Forced Disappearance of Persons
  - Inter-American Convention on International Commercial Arbitration
  - Inter-American Convention on International Traffic in Minors
  - Inter-American Convention on Letters Rogatory
  - Inter-American Convention on Proof of and Information on Foreign Law
  - Inter-American Convention on Serving Criminal Sentences Abroad
  - Inter-American Convention on the Elimination of all Forms of Discrimination Against Persons with Disabilities
  - Inter-American Convention on the International Amateur Radio Permit
  - Inter-American Convention on the International Return of Children
  - Inter-American Convention on the Prevention, Punishment and Eradication of Violence against Women
  - Inter-American Convention on Transparency in Conventional Weapons Acquisition
  - Inter-American Convention to Prevent and Punish Torture
  - The Inter-American Convention on Human Rights is correctly titled the American Convention on Human Rights
