= Richard A. Gardner =

American child psychiatrist (1931–2003)

- Born: Richard Alan Gardner; April 28, 1931; New York City, U.S.
- Died: May 25, 2003 (aged 72); Tenafly, New Jersey, U.S.
- Known for: Parental alienation syndrome
- Scientific career
- Fields: Child psychiatry
- Workplaces: Columbia University
- Website: richardagardner.com

Richard Alan Gardner (April 28, 1931 – May 25, 2003) was an American child psychiatrist known for his work in psychotherapy with children, parental alienation and child custody evaluations. Based on his clinical work with children and families, Gardner introduced the term parental alienation syndrome (PAS), which is now "largely rejected by most credible professionals". He wrote 41 books and more than 200 journal articles and book chapters. He developed child play therapy and test materials that he published through his company Creative Therapeutics. Gardner was an expert witness in child custody cases.

== Work and career ==
Gardner graduated from Columbia College, Columbia University in 1952 and SUNY Downstate Medical Center in 1956. After internship at Montefiore Hospital, he completed residencies in adult psychiatry and in child psychiatry at the New York State Psychiatric Institute. He was certified as a psychoanalyst in 1966 after training at the William Alanson White Institute.

From 1960 to 1962, he worked as director of child psychiatry in the U.S. Army Hospital, Frankfurt am Main, Germany.

Gardner's professional affiliations included memberships in the American Psychiatric Association, the American Academy of Child and Adolescent Psychiatry, the American Academy of Psychoanalysis, the American Medical Association, the American Society of Psychoanalytic Physicians, and the American Academy of Psychiatry and the Law.

From 1963 until his death, Gardner was a clinical professor at Columbia University's medical school, Division of Child and Adolescent Psychiatry. He also held academic teaching appointments at the William Alanson White Institute (1966–83), the University of Louvain, Belgium (1980–82), and at the University of St. Petersburg, Russia (1989-1997).

Gardner wrote about false allegations of sexual abuse in his 1990 book Sex Abuse Hysteria: Salem Witch Trials Revisited. He assisted the defense team of Margaret Kelly Michaels, which successfully appealed her prison conviction in the Wee Care Nursery School abuse trial.

In 1970, when divorce was becoming more common in the United States, Gardner wrote Boys and Girls Book About Divorce to provide children with suggestions on how to cope. In 1973, he created one of the first board games for use in child psychotherapy.

== Parental alienation syndrome ==
Gardner has been accused by the Leadership Council on Child Abuse and Interpersonal Violence of expressing sympathy towards people with an attraction to minors. Further, he has been accused of devising his alienation theory "not based on any research but on his personal beliefs and biases, with an interest in providing a weapon for lawyers seeking to undermine a mother's credibility in court." He is said to have estimated deliberate false reporting among mothers at 90%, which experts have disputed, citing research commissioned by the United States Department of Justice that found an actual rate less than 2%.

Gardner's observation of a "parental alienation syndrome" focused on how one parent may misuse the powers of socialization to turn a child against a once loved parent. Gardner's labeling of alienation processes as a "syndrome" remains controversial among psychiatrists, psychologists, and psychotherapists. PAS has not been recognized by the American Psychiatric Association or any other medical or professional association. It has been extensively criticized by scientists and jurists, who describe it as inadmissible in child custody hearings based on both science and law. Gardner asserted that PAS is scientifically valid and legally admissible. Proposals to include PAS in the Diagnostic and Statistical Manual of Mental Disorders have been controversial. PAS was not included in DSM-5.

The American Bar Association (ABA) published a review of parental alienation syndrome and concluded that it is without scientific basis. The ABA has since published a book acknowledging the phenomenon of distorting perception in a child. For example, when a child maintains that the mother never did anything for them, and yet there is "independent information that shows the mother did everything from breastfeeding to teaching the child how to read". However, this is different than a child's claims of abuse. Trocme and Bala studied over seven thousand abuse investigations and found that of the allegations that had been ultimately determined to be false, none had come from the children themselves.

Carol S. Bruch, Research Professor of Law at the University of California, Davis, implied that Gardner's description of PAS could inflict emotions on his audience. She found lack of careful analysis and rigor among the adopters of Gardner's observations.

In a 2002 article in the American Journal of Family Therapy, Gardner dismissed most of his critics as either biased or misinformed. "Attorneys frequently select out-of-context material in order to enhance their positions in courts of law... some of these misperceptions and misrepresentations have become so widespread that I considered it judicious to formulate this statement," he wrote.

In the same article, Gardner denied that he condoned pedophilia. "I believe that pedophilia is a bad thing for society," he wrote. "I do believe, however, that pedophilia, like all other forms of atypical sexuality is part of the human repertoire and that all humans are born with the potential to develop any of the forms of atypical sexuality (which are referred to as paraphilias by DSM-IV). My acknowledgment that a form of behavior is part of the human potential is not an endorsement of that behavior. Rape, murder, sexual sadism, and sexual harassment are all part of the human potential. This does not mean I sanction these abominations."

Gardner also advocated against mandatory reporting laws for child abuse, against immunity from prosecution of individuals reporting child abuse and for the creation of programs with federal funding designed to assist individuals claimed to be falsely accused of child abuse.

== Personal life and death ==
Gardner was born in The Bronx on April 28, 1931. He had three children with Lee Gardner before their divorce.

He died by suicide after stabbing himself at his home in Tenafly, New Jersey on May 25, 2003, at age 72. His son said that Gardner had developed type I complex regional pain syndrome, a neurological syndrome formerly known as reflex sympathetic dystrophy, a syndrome known for severe, intractable pain.

== Works ==
- Richard A. Gardner (1966). The Child's Book about Brain Injury. Association for Brain Injured Children.
- Richard A. Gardner (1978). Dr. Gardner's Fairy Tales for Today's Children. Creative Therapeutics. ISBN 978-0-933812-02-4.
- Richard A. Gardner (1980). Dorothy and the Lizard of Oz. Creative Therapeutics. ISBN 978-0-933812-03-1.
- Richard A. Gardner (1983). Dr. Gardner's Modern Fairy Tales. Creative Therapeutics. ISBN 978-0-933812-09-3.
- Richard A. Gardner (1985). The Boys and Girls Book About Divorce. Bantam. ISBN 978-0-553276-19-0.
- Richard A. Gardner (1986). Therapeutic Communication With Children: The Mutual Storytelling Technique. Jason Aronson. ISBN 978-0-876688-56-4.
- Richard A. Gardner (1987). The Parental Alienation Syndrome and the Differentiation between Fabricated and Genuine Child Sex Abuse. Creative Therapeutics. ISBN 978-0-933812-17-8.
- Richard A. Gardner (1987). Sex Abuse Legitimacy Scale (Sal Scale). Creative therapeutics. ISBN 978-0-933812-19-2.
- Richard A. Gardner (1991). Sex Abuse Hysteria: Salem Witch Trials Revisited. Creative Therapeutics. ISBN 978-0-933812-22-2.
- Richard A. Gardner (1992). True and False Accusations of Child Sex Abuse.
- Richard A. Gardner (1995). Protocols for the Sex-Abuse Evaluation. Creative Therapeutics. ISBN 978-0-933812-38-3.
- Richard A. Gardner (1996). Psychotherapy with Sex-Abuse Victims: True, False, and Hysterical. Creative Therapeutics. ISBN 978-0-933812-41-3.
- Richard A. Gardner (1998). The Parental Alienation Syndrome: A Guide for Mental Health and Legal Professionals. Creative Therapeutics. ISBN 978-0-933812-42-0.
- Richard A. Gardner (2001). Sex-Abuse Trauma?: Or Trauma from Other Sources?. Creative Therapeutics. ISBN 978-0-933812-47-5.
