= Janet Meik Wright =

American legal scholar (born 1946)

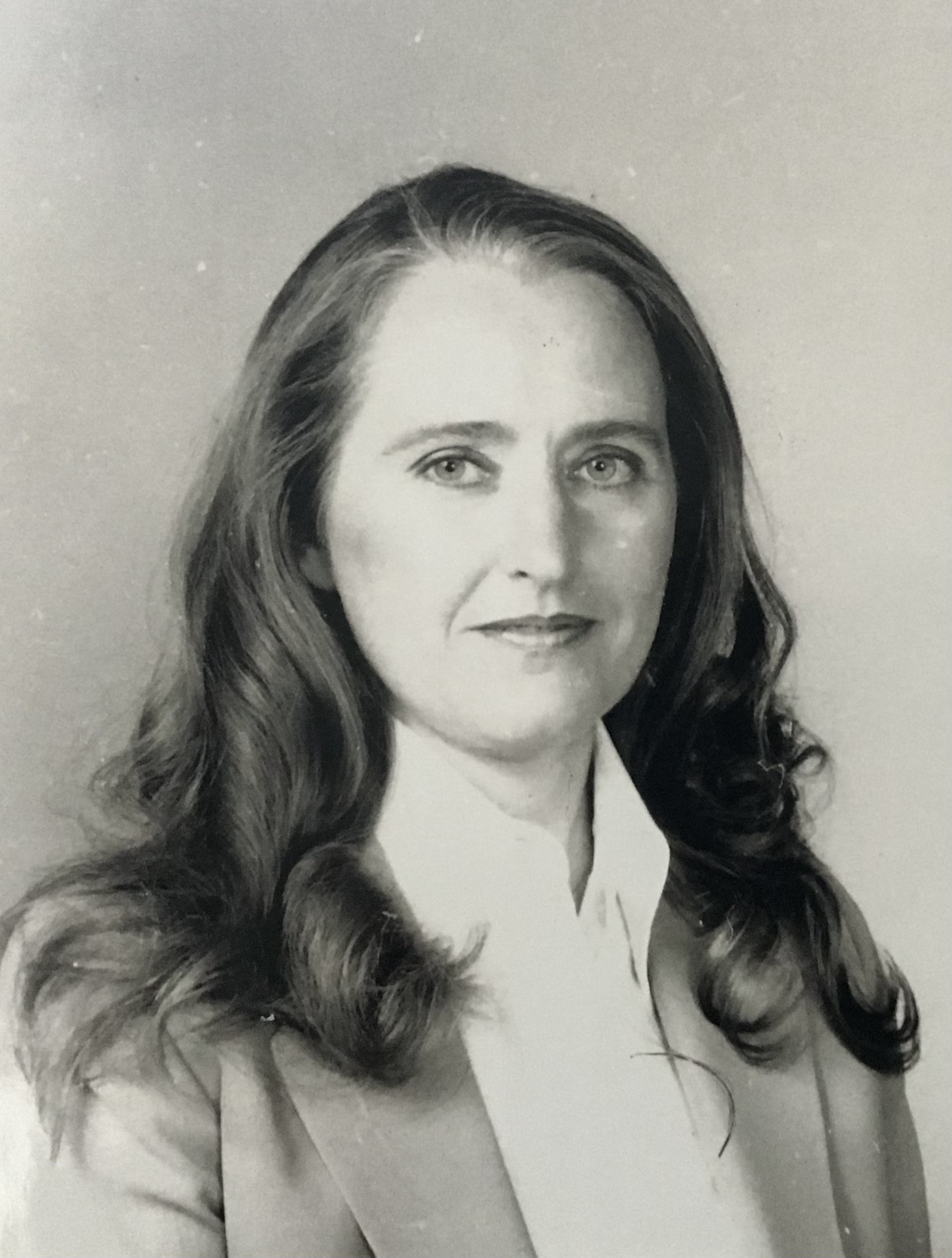
- Born: Janet Leigh Meik; November 11, 1946 (age 79); Missoula, Montana, U.S.
- Education: University of California, Santa Barbara (B.A); University of Southern California Law School (J.D.)
- Occupations: Law professor, attorney
- Known for: Expert on estate planning, community property, and closely held business transactions
- Spouse: 1) Richard K. Sigler (m. 1968; div. 1972) 2) Jonathan T. Wright (m. 1974)

Janet Leigh Meik Wright (born November 11, 1946) is an American legal scholar who has taught community property, estate planning and non-profit institutions at the University of Southern California, University of California, Los Angeles, and University of California, Davis.

== Biography ==
Wright was born in Missoula, Montana, raised in Thompson Falls, and studied at the University of California, Santa Barbara, where she competed in debate and received a B.A. in 1968. She attended the University of Southern California School of Law, serving as editor-in-chief of the Southern California Law Review, and graduating Order of the Coif with a J.D. in 1971. After law school, she clerked for Justice Raymond E. Peters of the California Supreme Court, and then for Associate Justice of the United States Supreme Court William O. Douglas from 1972 to 1973. She clerked during the same term for Douglas as Carol S. Bruch, and was among the first six female law clerks at the U.S. Supreme Court. Following her clerkships, she returned to San Francisco and practiced law at Howard, Rice, Nemerovski, Canady, Robertson & Falk.

In 1975, she joined the law school faculty of the University of California, Los Angeles, as Acting Law Professor. In 1976, she left to become an assistant professor of law at USC Law School. In 1983, she was a visiting professor at the UC Davis Law School. She was active in State Bar committees, serving in 1987 on the Executive Committee of the Estate Planning, Trust and Probate Law Section that worked with the California Law Revision Commission on statutory reforms.

Currently, she practices at her own law firm in Fresno, California, where she specializes in estate planning, taxation, and general business transactions, with an emphasis on planning for closely held businesses and charitable planning.

== Personal life ==
In 1968, she married Richard K. Sigler in Tulare, California. In 1972, the couple divorced. In 1974, she remarried to Jonathan T. Wright, whom she had met while clerking in Washington, D.C.

== See also ==
- List of law clerks for the fourth seat of the Supreme Court of the United States
