= List of law clerks for the fourth seat of the Supreme Court of the United States =

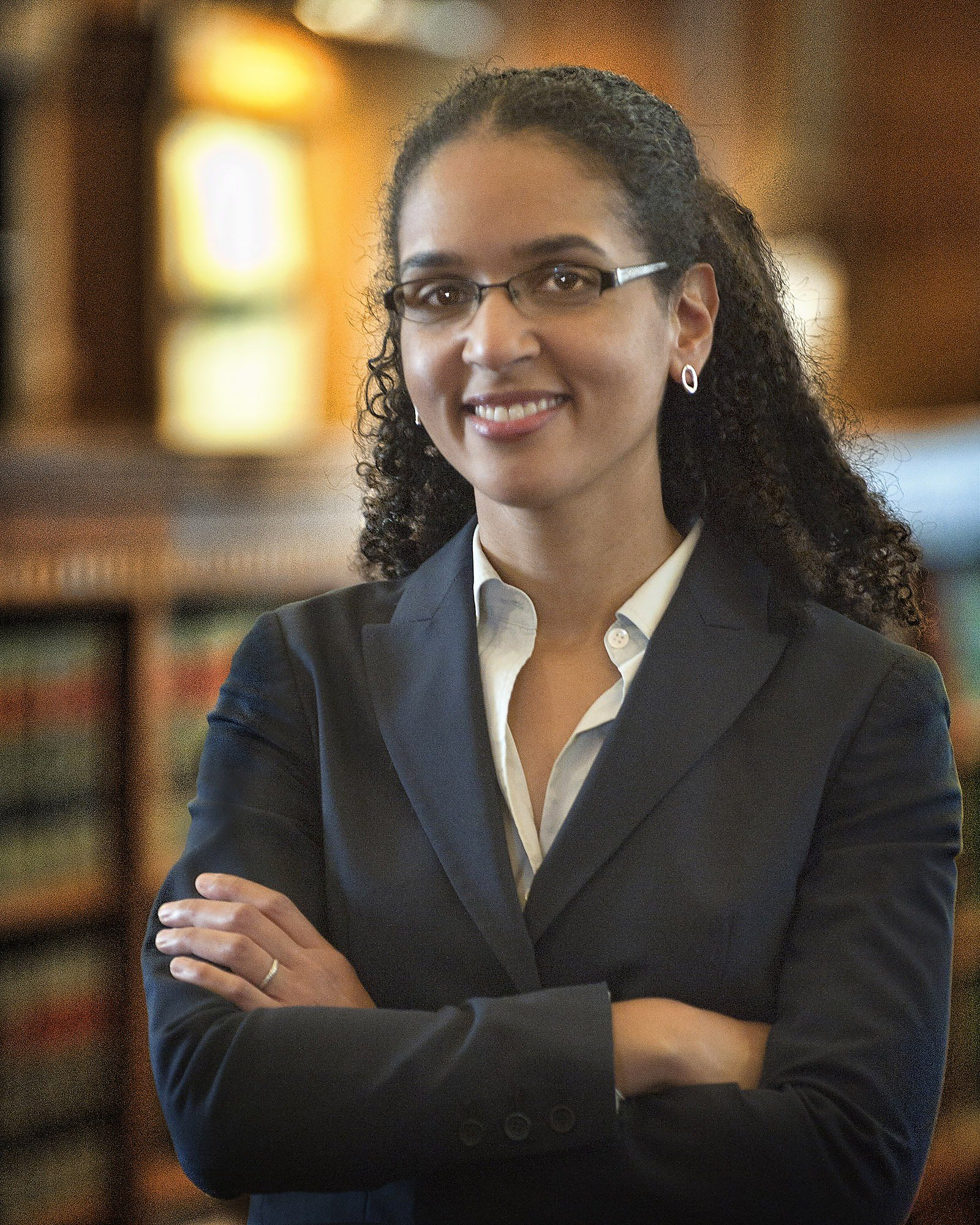
Justice Leondra Kruger of the California Supreme Court clerked for Justice John Paul Stevens from 2003 until 2004.

Law clerks have assisted the justices of the United States Supreme Court in various capacities since the first one was hired by Justice Horace Gray in 1882. Each Associate Justice is permitted to employ four law clerks per Court term; the Chief Justice may employ five. Most persons serving in this capacity are recent law school graduates (and typically graduated at the top of their class). Among their many functions, clerks do legal research that assists justices in deciding what cases to accept and what questions to ask during oral arguments, prepare memoranda, and draft orders and opinions. After retiring from the Court, a justice may continue to employ a law clerk, who may be assigned to provide additional assistance to an active justice or may assist the retired justice when sitting by designation with a lower court.

== Table of law clerks ==
The following is a table of law clerks serving the associate justice holding the fourth seat of the Supreme Court (the Court's fourth associate justice seat by the order of precedence of the inaugural associate justices (Note: Their place in the order of precedence was based upon the seniority of their commission from President George Washington following their confirmation by the U.S. Senate.)) which was established on September 24, 1789 by the 1st Congress through the Judiciary Act of 1789 (1 Stat. 73). This seat is currently occupied by Justice Elena Kagan.

Seat 4 associate justices and law clerks

Samuel Freeman Miller

July 21, 1862 –
October 13, 1890

| Clerk | Started | Finished | School (year) | Previous clerkship |
|---|---|---|---|---|
| Noble E. Dawson | 1885? | | | |
| Irvine D. York | 1885 | 1889 | | |

Henry Billings Brown

January 5, 1891 –
May 28, 1906

| Clerk | Started | Finished | School (year) | Previous clerkship |
|---|---|---|---|---|
| A. B. Hall | 1890 | 1896 | | |
| Charles F. Wilson | ? | May 28, 1906 | Columbian-GW | |

William Henry Moody

December 17, 1906 –
November 20, 1910

| Clerk | Started | Finished | School (year) | Previous clerkship |
|---|---|---|---|---|
| Sheldon Eaton Wardwell | 1907 | 1908 | Harvard (1907) | |
| John A. Kratz, Jr. | 1909? | | | |
| Charles F. Wilson | December 17, 1906 | November 20, 1910 | Columbian-GW | Henry Billings Brown |

Joseph Rucker Lamar

January 3, 1911 –
January 2, 1916

| Clerk | Started | Finished | School (year) | Previous clerkship |
|---|---|---|---|---|
| S. Edward Widdifield | 1910 | 1912 | Detroit (c. 1898) | R. W. Peckham |
| John E. Hoover | 1912 | 1916 | | Harlan I / R. W. Peckham |

Louis Brandeis

June 5, 1916 –
February 13, 1939

| Clerk | Started | Finished | School (year) | Previous clerkship |
|---|---|---|---|---|
| Calvert Magruder | 1916 | 1917 | Harvard (1916) | none |
| Dean G. Acheson | 1919 | 1921 | Harvard (1918) | none |
| William A. Sutherland | 1921 | 1923 | Harvard (1917) | none |
| William G. Rice, Jr. | 1921 | 1922 | Harvard (1920) | none |
| William Edward McCurdy | 1922 | 1923 | Harvard (1922) | none |
| Samuel H. Maslon | 1923 | 1924 | Harvard (1923) | none |
| Warren Stilson Ege | 1924 | 1925 | Harvard (1924) | none |
| James M. Landis | 1925 | 1926 | Harvard (1924) | none |
| Robert G. Page | 1926 | 1927 | Harvard (1925) | none |
| Henry J. Friendly | 1927 | 1928 | Harvard (1927) | none |
| Irving B. Goldsmith | 1928 | 1929 | Harvard (LLB 1926, SJD 1927) | none |
| Louis Levanthal Jaffe | 1928 | 1931 (or 1933–34) | Harvard (LLB 1928, SJD 1932) | none |
| Harry Shulman | 1929 | 1930 | Harvard (1926) | |
| H. Thomas Austern | 1930 | 1931 | Harvard (1929) | Mack (2d Cir.) |
| Henry Melvin Hart Jr. | 1931 | 1932 | Harvard (LLB 1930, SJD 1931) | |
| Paul A. Freund | 1932 | 1933 | Harvard (1932) | |
| Nathaniel L. Nathanson | 1934 | 1935 | Harvard (1933) | Mack (2d Cir.) |
| David Riesman | 1935 | 1936 | Harvard (1934) | none |
| James Willard Hurst | 1935 | 1937 | Harvard (1935) | none |
| W. Graham Claytor, Jr. | 1937 | 1938 | Harvard (1936) | L. Hand (2d Cir.) |
| Adrian S. Fisher | 1938 | Feb. 13, 1939 | Harvard (1937) | |

William O. Douglas

April 17, 1939 –
November 12, 1975

| Clerk | Started | Finished | School (year) | Previous clerkship |
|---|---|---|---|---|
| C. David Ginsburg | 1939 | 1940 | Harvard (1935) | none |
| Stanley C. Soderland | 1939 | 1940 | Washington (1939) | none |
| Walter B. Chaffee | 1941 | 1942 | Berkeley (1940) | none |
| Vern Countryman | 1942 | 1943 | Washington (1942) | none |
| Eugene E. Beyer Jr. | 1943 | 1944 | Yale (1943) | |
| Lucile Lomen (Note: First woman to clerk at the U.S. Supreme Court.) | 1944 | 1945 | Washington (1944) | none |
| Donald R. Colvin | 1945 | 1946 | Washington (1945) | none |
| J. Roger Wollenberg | 1946 | 1947 | Berkeley (1942) | none |
| Stanley E. Sparrowe | 1947 | 1948 | Berkeley (1946) | |
| Gary Jerome Torre | 1948 | 1949 | Berkeley (1948) | none |
| Warren M. Christopher | 1949 | 1950 | Stanford (1949) | none |
| John G. Burnett | 1950 | 1951 | Yale (1950) | none |
| Hans A. Linde | 1950 | 1951 | Berkeley (1950) | none |
| Marshall L. Small | 1951 | 1952 | Stanford (1951) | none |
| Charles E. Ares | 1952 | 1953 | Arizona (1952) | none |
| James F. Crafts, Jr. | 1953 | 1954 | Stanford (1953) | none |
| Harvey M. Grossman | 1954 | 1955 | UCLA (1954) | |
| William A. Norris | 1955 | 1956 | Stanford (1954) | none |
| William Cohen | 1956 | 1957 | UCLA (1956) | none |
| Charles E. Rickershauser, Jr. | 1957 | 1958 | UCLA (1957) | none |
| Charles A. Miller | 1958 | 1959 | Berkeley (1958) | none |
| Steven B. Duke | 1959 | 1960 | Arizona (1959) | none |
| Bernard E. Jacob | 1960 | 1961 | Berkeley (1960) | none |
| Thomas J. Klitgaard | 1961 | 1962 | Berkeley (1961) | none |
| Jared G. Carter | 1962 | 1963 | Stanford (1962) | none |
| Evan L. Schwab | 1963 | 1964 | Washington (1963) | |
| James S. Campbell | 1964 | 1965 | Stanford (1964) | |
| Jerome B. Falk, Jr. | 1965 | 1966 | Berkeley (1965) | none |
| Lewis B. Merrifield, III | 1966 | 1967 | USC (1966) | |
| William A. Reppy, Jr. | 1967 | 1968 | Stanford (1966) | Peters (Cal.) |
| Carl J. ("Kim") Seneker II | 1967 | 1968 | Berkeley (1967) | none |
| Peter Westen | 1968 | 1969 | Berkeley (1968) | none |
| Thomas C. Armitage | 1969 | 1970 | UCLA (1969) | |
| Dennis C. Brown | 1970 | 1971 | UCLA (1970) | none |
| Lucas A. ("Scot") Powe, Jr. | 1970 | 1971 | Washington (1968) | |
| William H. Alsup | 1971 | 1972 | Harvard (1971) | none |
| Richard L. Jacobson | 1971 | 1972 | USC (1970) | Ely (9th Cir.) |
| Kenneth R. Reed | 1971 | 1972 | Arizona (1971) | none |
| Carol S. Bruch | 1972 | 1973 | Berkeley (1972) | none |
| Peter M. Kreindler | 1972 | 1973 | Harvard (1971) | I. Kaufman (2d Cir.) |
| Janet L. Meik (Wright) | 1972 | 1973 | USC (1971) | Peters (Cal.) |
| Ira M. Ellman | 1973 | 1974 | Berkeley (1973) | none |
| Richard W. Benka | 1973 | 1974 | Harvard (1973) | none |
| Michael J. Clutter | 1973 | 1974 | USC (1973) | none |
| Alan Karl Austin | 1974 | 1975 | Stanford (1974) | |
| Donald E. Kelley Jr. | 1974 | 1975 | Stanford (1973) | Peckham (N.D. Calf.) |
| Jay Kelly Wright | 1974 | 1975 | Harvard (1973) | Leventhal (D.C. Cir.) |
| Alan B. Sternstein | 1975 | November 12, 1975 | Arizona (1975) | none |
| George A. Rutherglen (shared with Stevens) | 1975 | 1976 | Berkeley (1974) | J. C. Wallace (9th Cir.) |
| Dennis J. Hutchinson | 1976 | 1977 | Texas (1974) | B. White / Tuttle (1st Cir.) |
| Montana J. Podva | 1977 | 1980 | McGeorge (1977) | |

John Paul Stevens

December 19, 1975 –
June 29, 2010

| Clerk | Started | Finished | School (year) | Previous clerkship |
|---|---|---|---|---|
| Sharon Baldwin | 1975 | 1976 | Chicago (1975) | Stevens (7th Cir.) |
| Charles ("Skip") Paul | 1975 | 1976 | Santa Clara (1975) | |
| George A. Rutherglen (shared with Douglas) | 1975 | 1976 | Berkeley (1974) | J. C. Wallace (9th Cir.) |
| Daniel A. Farber | 1976 | 1977 | Illinois (1975) | Tone (7th Cir.) |
| Gregory D. Huffaker, Jr. | 1976 | 1977 | Harvard (1976) | |
| David V. Kirby | 1976 | 1977 | Northwestern (1975) | Sprecher (7th Cir.) |
| Francis S. Blake | 1977 | 1978 | Columbia (1976) | Feinberg (2d Cir.) |
| Stewart A. Baker | 1977 | 1978 | UCLA (1976) | Coffin (1st Cir.) |
| John E. Muench | 1977 | 1978 | Northwestern (1976) | Sprecher (7th Cir.) |
| Susan R. Estrich | 1978 | 1979 | Harvard (1977) | J. S. Wright (D.C. Cir.) |
| James S. Liebman | 1978 | 1979 | Stanford (1977) | McGowan (D.C. Cir.) |
| Peter D. Isakoff | 1979 | 1980 | Columbia (1978) | Feinberg (2d Cir.) |
| Michele L. Odorizzi | 1979 | 1980 | Chicago (1976) | Tone (7th Cir.) |
| Jeffrey R. Tone | 1980 | 1981 | Illinois (1978) | P. Marshall (N.D. Ill.) |
| Constantine L. ("Connie") Trela, Jr. | 1980 | 1981 | Northwestern (1979) | Sprecher (7th Cir.) |
| David W. DeBruin | 1981 | 1982 | Michigan (1980) | H. Edwards (D.C. Cir.) |
| Matthew Joseph Verschelden | 1981 | 1982 | Virginia (1980) | Haynsworth (4th Cir.) |
| Carol F. Lee | 1982 | 1983 | Yale (1981) | J. S. Wright (D.C. Cir.) |
| Jeffrey S. Lehman | 1982 | 1983 | Michigan (1981) | Coffin (1st Cir.) |
| Lawrence E. Rosenthal | 1983 | 1984 | Harvard (1982) | P. Marshall (N.D. Ill.) |
| John R. Schaibley, III | 1983 | 1984 | Indiana (1981) | Eschbach (7th Cir.) |
| Richard B. Kapnick | 1984 | 1985 | Chicago (1983) | Simon (Ill.) |
| James E. McCollum | 1984 | 1985 | Howard (1983) | Pierce (2d Cir.) |
| Rory Knox Little (shared with Brennan, Stewart, Powell) | 1984 | 1985 | Yale (1982) | Oberdorfer (D.D.C.) |
| Stephen James Marzen | 1985 | 1986 | Harvard (1984) | Wilkey (D.C. Cir.) |
| Clifford M. Sloan | 1985 | 1986 | Harvard (1984) | J. S. Wright (D.C. Cir.) |
| Ronald D. Lee | 1986 | 1987 | Yale (1985) | Mikva (D.C. Cir.) |
| Lawrence C. Marshall | 1986 | 1987 | Northwestern (1985) | Wald (D.C. Cir.) |
| Teresa Wynn Roseborough | 1987 | 1988 | North Carolina (1985) | J. D. Phillips (4th Cir.) |
| Abner S. Greene | 1987 | 1989 | Michigan (1986) | Wald (D.C. Cir.) |
| Diane Marie Amann | 1988 | 1989 | Northwestern (1986) | P. Marshall (N.D. Ill.) |
| Lewis J. Liman | 1988 | 1989 | Yale (1987) | Leval (S.D.N.Y.) |
| Randolph D. Moss | 1988 | 1989 | Yale (1986) | Leval (S.D.N.Y.) |
| Marina C. Hsieh | 1989 | 1990 | Berkeley (1988) | L. Pollak (E.D. Pa.) |
| Christopher Eisgruber | 1989 | 1990 | Chicago (1988) | P. Higginbotham (5th Cir.) |
| Preeta D. Bansal | 1990 | 1991 | Harvard (1989) | Oakes (2d Cir.) |
| Matthew D. Roberts | 1990 | 1991 | Harvard (1989) | R. B. Ginsburg (D.C. Cir.) |
| Nancy S. Marder | 1990 | 1992 | Yale (1987) | W. Norris (9th Cir.) / Sand (S.D.N.Y.) |
| Robert A. Schapiro | 1991 | 1992 | Yale (1990) | Leval (S.D.N.Y.) |
| Kathleen Moriarty (Mueller) | 1991 | 1992 | Northwestern (1990) | Wald (D.C. Cir.) |
| Stephen R. Reily | 1991 | 1992 | Stanford (1990) | Wisdom (5th Cir.) |
| Pamela A. Harris (Schlick) | 1992 | 1993 | Yale (1990) | H. Edwards (D.C. Cir.) |
| Peter M. Yu | 1992 | 1993 | Harvard (1991) | Wald (D.C. Cir.) |
| Douglas A. Winthrop | 1992 | 1993 | Minnesota (1991) | Wald (D.C. Cir.) |
| Sean H. Donahue | 1993 | 1994 | Chicago (1992) | R. B. Ginsburg (D.C. Cir.) |
| Daniel M. Klerman | 1993 | 1994 | Chicago (1991) | Posner (7th Cir.) |
| Corinne A. Beckwith | 1993 | 1994 | Michigan (1992) | Cudahy (7th Cir.) |
| Deanne E. Maynard (shared with Powell) | 1993 | 1994 | Harvard (1991) | S. Harris (D.D.C.) |
| Ian Heath Gershengorn | 1994 | 1995 | Harvard (1993) | Kearse (2d Cir.) |
| Gregory P. Magarian | 1994 | 1995 | Michigan (1993) | Oberdorfer (D.D.C.) |
| Craig D. Singer | 1994 | 1995 | Chicago (1993) | Mikva (D.C. Cir.) |
| James J. Benjamin (shared with Powell) | 1994 | 1995 | Virginia (1990) | J. F. Motz (D. Md.) |
| David J. Barron | 1995 | 1996 | Harvard (1994) | Reinhardt (9th Cir.) |
| Jeffrey C. Dobbins | 1995 | 1996 | Duke (1994) | Tatel (D.C. Cir.) / Mikva (D.C. Cir.) |
| Eileen M. Mullen | 1995 | 1996 | Stanford (1993) | |
| Mark David Harris (shared with Powell) | 1995 | 1996 | Harvard (1992) | Flaum (7th Cir.) |
| Melissa R. Hart | 1996 | 1997 | Harvard (1995) | Calabresi (2d Cir.) |
| Olatunde C. Johnson | 1996 | 1997 | Stanford (1995) | Tatel (D.C. Cir.) |
| Jonathan E. Levitsky | 1996 | 1997 | Yale (1995) | Leval (2d Cir.) |
| John L. Flynn (shared with White) | 1996 | 1997 | Georgetown (1995) | Becker (3d Cir.) |
| Elizabeth A. Cavanagh | 1997 | 1998 | Yale (1995) | Oberdorfer (D.D.C.) |
| David S. Friedman | 1997 | 1998 | Harvard (1996) | Boudin (1st Cir.) |
| Christopher J. Meade | 1997 | 1998 | NYU (1996) | H. Edwards (D.C. Cir.) |
| Benjamin A. Powell (shared with White) | 1997 | 1998 | Columbia (1996) | J. M. Walker (2d Cir.) |
| Jeffrey L. Fisher | 1998 | 1999 | Michigan (1997) | Reinhardt (9th Cir.) |
| Allison A. Marston (Danner) | 1998 | 1999 | Stanford (1997) | J. Noonan (9th Cir.) |
| Adam M. Samaha | 1998 | 1999 | Harvard (1996) | A. Keith (Minn.) |
| J. Brett Busby (shared with White) | 1999 | 2000 | Columbia (1998) | Tjoflat (11th Cir.) |
| Deborah N. Pearlstein | 1999 | 2000 | Harvard (1998) | Boudin (1st Cir.) |
| Joshua P. Waldman | 1999 | 2000 | Columbia (1998) | Garland (D.C. Cir.) |
| Sonja R. West | 1999 | 2000 | Chicago (1998) | D. W. Nelson (9th Cir.) |
| Eduardo Peñalver | 2000 | 2001 | Yale (1999) | Calabresi (2d Cir.) |
| Andrew M. Siegel | 2000 | 2001 | NYU (1999) | Leval (2d Cir.) |
| Joseph T. Thai (shared with White) | 2000 | 2001 | Harvard (1998) | Ebel (10th Cir.) |
| Anne M. Voigts | 2000 | 2001 | Columbia (1999) | Reinhardt (9th Cir.) |
| Kathleen R. Hartnett (Gilbert) | 2001 | 2002 | Harvard (2000) | Garland (D.C. Cir.) |
| Alison J. Nathan | 2001 | 2002 | Cornell (2000) | B. Fletcher (9th Cir.) |
| Ed Siskel | 2001 | 2002 | Chicago (2000) | D. W. Nelson (9th Cir.) |
| Troy A. McKenzie | 2002 | 2003 | NYU (2000) | Leval (2d Cir.) |
| Eric R. Olson | 2002 | 2003 | Michigan (2000) | H. Edwards (D.C. Cir.) / Heyburn (W.D. Ky.) |
| Kathryn A. Watts | 2002 | 2003 | Northwestern (2001) | Randolph (D.C. Cir.) |
| Amy J. Wildermuth | 2002 | 2003 | Illinois (1998) | Calabresi (2d Cir.) / H. Edwards (D.C. Cir.) |
| Leondra Kruger | 2003 | 2004 | Yale (2001) | Tatel (D.C. Cir.) |
| Amanda Cohen Leiter | 2003 | 2004 | Harvard (2000) | Tatel (D.C. Cir.) / Gertner (D. Mass.) |
| Margaret H. Lemos | 2003 | 2004 | NYU (2001) | Lipez (1st Cir.) |
| Benjamin C. Mizer | 2003 | 2004 | Michigan (2002) | J. Rogers (D.C. Cir.) |
| Melissa Beth Arbus | 2004 | 2005 | Virginia (2003) | D. Motz (4th Cir.) |
| Roberto J. Gonzalez | 2004 | 2005 | Stanford (2003) | Calabresi (2d Cir.) |
| Michael J. Gottlieb | 2004 | 2005 | Harvard (2003) | Reinhardt (9th Cir.) |
| Daniel Calabretta | 2004 | 2005 | Chicago (2003) | W. Fletcher (9th Cir.) |
| Jean Galbraith (Tobacman) | 2005 | 2006 | Berkeley (2004) | Tatel (D.C. Cir.) |
| Daniel J. Lenerz | 2005 | 2006 | Stanford (2002) | S. Williams (D.C. Cir.) / Thompson (M.D. Ala.) |
| Sarah Eddy McCallum | 2005 | 2006 | Georgetown (2002) | J. M. Walker (2d Cir.) / Rakoff (S.D.N.Y.) |
| Samuel Spital | 2005 | 2006 | Harvard (2004) | H. Edwards (D.C. Cir.) |
| Nicholas J. Bagley | 2006 | 2007 | NYU (2005) | Tatel (D.C. Cir.) |
| Chad I. Golder | 2006 | 2007 | Yale (2005) | Garland (D.C. Cir.) |
| Jamal K. Greene | 2006 | 2007 | Yale (2005) | Calabresi (2d Cir.) |
| Lauren D. Sudeall | 2006 | 2007 | Harvard (2005) | Reinhardt (9th Cir.) |
| Todd Jason Gluth | 2007 | 2008 | Berkeley (2005) | W. Fletcher (9th Cir.) |
| Sara J. Klein | 2007 | 2008 | Cardozo (2005) | Lifland (D.N.J.) / Barry (3d Cir.) |
| Katherine A. ("Kate") Shaw | 2007 | 2008 | Northwestern (2006) | Posner (7th Cir.) |
| Abby C. Wright | 2007 | 2008 | Penn (2006) | Boudin (1st Cir.) |
| Jessica Bulman(-Pozen) | 2008 | 2009 | Yale (2007) | Garland (D.C. Cir.) |
| Cecelia M. Klingele | 2008 | 2009 | Wisconsin (2005) | S. Black (11th Cir.) / Crabb (W.D. Wis.) |
| Lindsey Powell | 2008 | 2009 | Stanford (2007) | Garland (D.C. Cir.) |
| Damian Williams | 2008 | 2009 | Yale (2007) | Garland (D.C. Cir.) |
| Hyland Hunt | 2009 | 2010 | Michigan (2008) | D. Ginsburg (D.C. Cir.) |
| Adam C. Jed | 2009 | 2010 | Harvard (2008) | Calabresi (2d Cir.) |
| Merritt E. McAlister | 2009 | 2010 | Georgia (2007) | R. L. Anderson (11th Cir.) |
| David E. Pozen | 2009 | 2010 | Yale (2007) | Garland (D.C. Cir.) |
| Samuel T. C. ("Sam") Erman (shared with Kennedy) | 2010 | 2011 | Michigan (2007) | Garland (D.C. Cir.) |
| Dina B. Mishra (shared with Kennedy) | 2011 | 2012 | Yale (2009) | Boudin (1st Cir.) |
| Eduardo Francisco Bruera (shared with Sotomayor) | 2012 | 2013 | Cornell (2011) | C. King (5th Cir.) |
| Aaron Zelinsky (shared with Kennedy) | 2013 | 2014 | Yale (2010) | Griffith (D.C. Cir.) |
| Travis Crum (shared with Kennedy) | 2014 | 2015 | Yale (2011) | Tatel (D.C. Cir.) / Thompson (M.D. Ala.) |
| Gillian S. Grossman (shared with Kennedy) | 2015 | 2016 | Harvard (2014) | Kavanaugh (D.C. Cir.) |
| Teresa A. Reed (Dippo) (shared with Kennedy) | 2016 | 2017 | Stanford (2015) | Millett (D.C. Cir.) |
| Donald Larry Ray Goodson (shared with Kennedy) | 2017 | 2018 | NYU (2013) | Nathan (S.D.N.Y.) / Katzmann (2d Cir.) |
| Sarah Hartman Sloan (shared with Kagan) | 2018 | 2019 | Columbia (2016) | Nathan (S.D.N.Y.) / Friedland (9th Cir.) |

Elena Kagan

August 7, 2010 –
Incumbent

| Clerk | Started | Finished | School (year) | Previous clerkship |
|---|---|---|---|---|
| Trisha B. Anderson (Newman) | 2010 | 2011 | Harvard (2003) | Sutton (6th Cir.) |
| Andrew Manuel Crespo | 2010 | 2011 | Harvard (2008) | Breyer / Reinhardt (9th Cir.) |
| Allon Shmuel Itzhak Kedem | 2010 | 2011 | Yale (2005) | Kennedy / Leval (2d Cir.) / Kravitz (D. Conn.) |
| Elizabeth Prelogar | 2010 | 2011 | Harvard (2008) | R. B. Ginsburg / Garland (D.C. Cir.) |
| Jeffrey R. Johnson | 2011 | 2012 | Harvard (2010) | Wilkinson (4th Cir.) |
| Rakesh N. Kilaru | 2011 | 2012 | Stanford (2010) | Wilkinson (4th Cir.) |
| Erica L. Ross | 2011 | 2012 | Stanford (2009) | Tatel (D.C. Cir.) |
| Jonathan P. Schneller | 2011 | 2012 | Harvard (2010) | Reinhardt (9th Cir.) |
| Samantha ("Sam") Bateman (Kilaru) | 2012 | 2013 | Stanford (2010) | Brinkema (E.D. Va.) / Garland (D.C. Cir.) |
| Brad Garcia | 2012 | 2013 | Harvard (2011) | Griffith (D.C. Cir.) |
| Zachary C. Schauf | 2012 | 2013 | Harvard (2011) | Garland (D.C. Cir.) |
| David R. Zimmer | 2012 | 2013 | Harvard (2010) | W. Fletcher (9th Cir.) |
| Eric F. Citron (shared with O'Connor) | 2012 | 2013 | Yale (2007) | Robertson (D.D.C.) / Tatel (D.C. Cir.) |
| Sophia Madeleine Brill | 2013 | 2014 | Yale (2011) | Garland (D.C. Cir.) |
| Ian Michael Fein | 2013 | 2014 | Berkeley (2011) | W. Fletcher (9th Cir.) / J. Rogers (D.C. Cir.) |
| Jason Clifford Murray | 2013 | 2014 | Harvard (2011) | Gorsuch (10th Cir.) |
| Mitchell Pearsall Reich | 2013 | 2014 | Harvard (2012) | Garland (D.C. Cir.) |
| William K. ("Will") Dreher | 2014 | 2015 | Harvard (2013) | Kavanaugh (D.C. Cir.) |
| Daniel Jacob Hemel | 2014 | 2015 | Yale (2012) | Srinivasan (D.C. Cir.) / Boudin (1st Cir.) |
| Amanda Kelly Rice | 2014 | 2015 | Harvard (2011) | Tatel (D.C. Cir.) / Boasberg (D.D.C.) |
| Elizabeth Wood Claytor Wilkins (Lake) | 2014 | 2015 | Yale (2013) | Garland (D.C. Cir.) |
| Yaria S. Dubin | 2015 | 2016 | Harvard (2013) | Srinivasan (D.C. Cir.) / Boasberg (D.D.C.) |
| Jeremy M. Feigenbaum | 2015 | 2016 | Harvard (2014) | Fletcher (9th Cir.) |
| Thomas K. Fu | 2015 | 2016 | Stanford (2014) | Garland (D.C. Cir.) |
| Jonathan S. Meltzer | 2015 | 2016 | Yale (2013) | Wilkinson (4th Cir.) |
| Elizabeth A. Bewley | 2016 | 2017 | Harvard (2015) | Griffith (D.C. Cir.) |
| Gerard J. Cedrone | 2016 | 2017 | Harvard (2014) | Gorsuch (10th Cir.) |
| Benjamin M. Eidelson | 2016 | 2017 | Yale (2014) | Garland (D.C. Cir.) |
| Elizabeth L. Henthorne | 2016 | 2017 | Georgetown (2014) | G. Woods (S.D.N.Y.) / Srinivasan (D.C. Cir.) |
| A. Zoe Bedell | 2017 | 2018 | Harvard (2016) | Kavanaugh (D.C. Cir.) |
| Lena Husani (Hughes) | 2017 | 2018 | Columbia (2012) | Cote (S.D.N.Y.) / G. Lynch (2d Cir.) |
| Jeremy Sidney Kreisberg | 2017 | 2018 | Harvard (2014) | Reinhardt (9th Cir.) |
| Ephraim A. McDowell | 2017 | 2018 | Harvard (2016) | Garland (D.C. Cir.) |
| Robert B. Niles | 2018 | 2019 | Harvard (2016) | Oetken (S.D.N.Y.) / Tatel (D.C. Cir.) |
| Ashley E. Robertson | 2018 | 2019 | Stanford (2016) | Srinivasan (D.C. Cir.) / Boasberg (D.D.C.) |
| Zachary B. Savage | 2018 | 2019 | NYU (2013) | Scirica (3d Cir.) / Furman (S.D.N.Y.) |
| Reema Shah | 2018 | 2019 | Yale (2016) | Srinivasan (D.C. Cir.) |
| Sarah Hartman Sloan (shared with Stevens) | 2018 | 2019 | Columbia (2016) | Nathan (S.D.N.Y.) / Friedland (9th Cir.) |
| Alexander W. Miller | 2019 | 2020 | Harvard (2017) | Moss (D.D.C.) / Griffith (D.C. Cir.) |
| Mica L. Moore | 2019 | 2020 | Chicago (2017) | W. Fletcher (9th Cir.) / Chhabria (N.D. Cal.) |
| Zayn Siddique | 2019 | 2020 | Yale (2016) | Pregerson (C.D. Cal.) / Tatel (D.C. Cir.) |
| Jordan Fraser Bock (Smith) | 2019 | 2020 | Berkeley (2017) | Friedland (9th Cir.) / Chhabria (N.D. Cal.) |
| Peter E. Davis | 2020 | 2021 | Stanford (2017) | Srinivasan (D.C. Cir.) / Boasberg (D.D.C.) |
| Madeleine Joseph | 2020 | 2021 | Harvard (2018) | S. Lynch (1st Cir.) / Howell (D.D.C.) |
| Isaac Park | 2020 | 2021 | Harvard (2018) | Srinivasan (D.C. Cir.) / Oetken (S.D.N.Y.) |
| Joshua W. Revesz | 2020 | 2021 | Yale (2017) | Garland (D.C. Cir.) |
| Eliza A. Lehner (hired by Ginsburg) | 2020 | 2021 | Yale (2017) | Watford (9th Cir.) / Furman (S.D.N.Y.) |
| Jennifer E. Fischell | 2021 | 2022 | Michigan (2016) | Kethledge (6th Cir.) / Abrams (S.D.N.Y.) |
| Alexandra C. Lim | 2021 | 2022 | Stanford (2019) | Friedland (9th Cir.) |
| Christine C. Smith | 2021 | 2022 | Yale (2019) | Griffith (D.C. Cir.) |
| Andrew Waks | 2021 | 2022 | Chicago (2019) | Tatel (D.C. Cir.) / Feinerman (N.D. Ill.) |
| Gavan W. Duffy Gideon | 2022 | 2023 | Harvard (2020) | Pillard (D.C. Cir.) |
| Daniel J. B. Kane | 2022 | 2023 | Stanford (2016) | Lohier (2d Cir.) / Engelmayer (S.D.N.Y.) |
| Hilary R. Ledwell | 2022 | 2023 | Yale (2017) | Boasberg (D.D.C.) / Rogers (D.C. Cir.) |
| Kyle Schneider | 2022 | 2023 | Stanford (2020) | Boasberg (D.D.C.) / Srinivasan (D.C. Cir.) |
| Esthena Barlow | 2023 | 2024 | Stanford (2020) | Barron (1st Cir.) / Sutton (6th Cir.) |
| Eric Brooks | 2023 | 2024 | Yale (2019) | Bibas (3rd Cir.) / Meyer (D. Conn.) |
| Parisa Sadeghi | 2023 | 2024 | Harvard (2021) | Srinivasan (D.C. Cir.) / Boasberg (D.D.C.) |
| Liza Starr | 2023 | 2024 | Stanford (2021) | Pillard (D.C. Cir.) |
| Matthew E. Morris | 2024 | 2025 | Harvard (2021) | AliKhan (D.C.) / Moss (D.D.C.) / Srinivasan (D.C. Cir.) |
| Nathan Raab | 2024 | 2025 | Harvard (2022) | Sutton (6th Cir.) / Friedrich (D.D.C.) |
| Diana Garnet Li | 2024 | 2025 | Stanford (2021) | Srinivasan (D.C. Cir.) / Oetken (S.D.N.Y.) |
| Brandon Thomas | 2024 | 2025 | Yale (2019) | Watford (9th Cir.) / Engelmayer (S.D.N.Y.) |
| Samuel Ayres | 2025 | 2026 | Yale (2022) | Srinivasan (D.C. Cir.) / Boasberg (D.D.C.) |
| Samantha "Sammy" Bensinger | 2025 | 2026 | Yale (2022) | Srinivasan (D.C. Cir.) / Boasberg (D.D.C.) |
| Taylor (Nicolas) Gleichauf | 2025 | 2026 | Stanford (2022) | Watford (9th Cir.) / Moss (D.D.C.) |
| Catherine Padhi | 2025 | 2026 | Harvard (2019) | Chhabria (N.D. Cal.) / Thapar (6th Cir.) |
| Gareth Fowler | 2026 | | Stanford (2024) | Pillard (D.C. Cir.) / Moss (D.D.C.) |
| Jessica Garland | 2026 | | Yale (2019) | Barron (1st Cir.) / Engelmayer (S.D.N.Y.) |
| Miles Gray | 2026 | | Penn (2024) | Oetken (S.D.N.Y.) / Nathan (2d Cir.) |
| Annie Kors | 2026 | | Chicago (2023) | Chhabria (N.D. Cal.) / Srinivasan (D.C. Cir.) |

== Additional sources ==
- Baier, Paul R. (1973). "The Law Clerks: Profile of an Institution," Vanderbilt L. Rev. 26: 1125–77.
- "Finding Aid to the Papers of William O. Douglas," Library of Congress (2014, rev'd Dec. 2014), p. 138, list of clerks.
- Freund, Paul A., "Historical Reminiscence, Justice Brandeis: A Law Clerk's Remembrance", 68 Am. Jewish Hist. 7 (1978).
- "Georgia Law Alumni Who Have Clerked for a U.S. Supreme Court Justice," Advocate, Spring/Summer 2004 (listing 6 names).
- Judicial Clerkship Handbook, USC Gould Law School, 2013-2014, p. 33, Appendix B.
- Mason, Alpheus T. (1946). Brandeis: a Free Man's Life. New York, NY: Viking Press. List of law clerks, p. 690. ISBN 978-1-199-56509-9, ISBN 978-1-199-56509-9.
- Mersky, Roy M. (1958). Louis Dembitz Brandeis, 1856–1941: a Bibliography. List of law clerks, p. 11 (New Haven, CT: Published for the Yale Law Library by the Yale Law School)(44 pp).
- Newland, Charles A. (June 1961). "Personal Assistants to the Supreme Court Justices: The Law Clerks," Oregon L. Rev. 40: 306–07.
- Small, Marshall L. (2007), "William O. Douglas Remembered (A Collecive Memory of WOD'S Law Clerks)", Journal of Supreme Court History 32.
- News of Supreme Court clerks. University of Virginia Law School, list of clerks, 2004-2018.
- University of Michigan clerks to the Supreme Court, 1991-2017, University of Michigan Law School Web site (2016). Retrieved September 20, 2016.
- Ward, Artemus and David L. Weiden (2006). Sorcerers' Apprentices: 100 Years of Law Clerks at the United States Supreme Court. New York, NY: New York University Press. ISBN 978-0-8147-9420-3, ISBN 978-0-8147-9420-3.
