= Inter-American Convention on the International Return of Children =

- Signed: July 15, 1989
- Location: Montevideo, Uruguay
- Effective: November 4, 1994
- Condition: 2 ratifications
- Signatories: 13
- Parties: 14
- Depositary: General Secretariat of the Organization of American States
- Languages: English, French, Portuguese, and Spanish

The Inter-American Convention on the International Return of Children is a treaty of the Organization of American States and was adopted at Montevideo, Uruguay on July 15, 1989, at the Fourth Inter-American Specialized Conference On Private International Law. Its entry into force was November 4, 1994.

The convention begins by broadly describing its intent in Article 1:

The purpose of this Convention is to secure the prompt return of children habitually resident in one State Party who have been wrongfully removed from any State to a State Party or who, having been lawfully removed, have been wrongfully retained. This Convention further seeks to secure enforcement of visitation and custody rights of parties entitled to them.

Over half of the 35 member states of the Organisation of American States are party to the Hague Convention on the Civil Aspects of International Child Abduction, and over a third of the member states are also party to the Inter-American Convention on the International Return of Children. When a state is party to both conventions, Article 34 of the Inter-American Convention assigns priority to the Inter-American Convention over the Hague Abduction Convention unless otherwise agreed upon between the states individually.

== See also ==
- International child abduction
- Inter-American Court of Human Rights
- Hague Abduction Convention
