= Vern Countryman =

American lawyer (1917–1999)

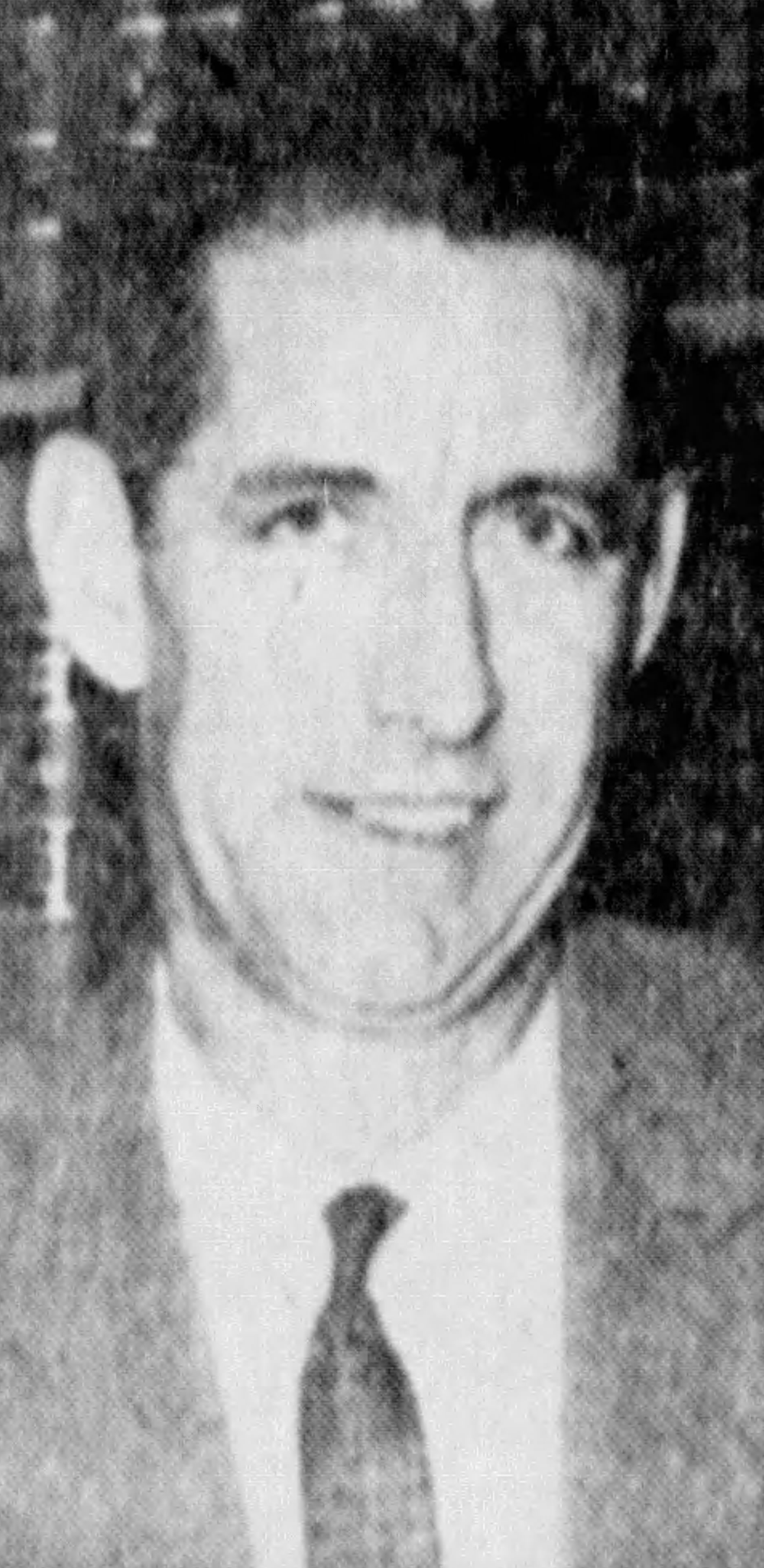
- Countryman c. 1959
- Born: May 13, 1917; Roundup, Montana, U.S.
- Died: May 2, 1999 (age 81); Cambridge, Massachusetts, U.S.
- Education: University of Washington (BA, LLB)
- Occupations: Royall Professor of Law
- Employer: Harvard Law School
- Known for: Bankruptcy expert; Opposed McCarthyism

Vernon Countryman (May 13, 1917 – May 2, 1999) was an American legal scholar at Harvard Law School who was an expert on bankruptcy and commercial law.

== Early years and education ==
Vern Countryman was born in Roundup, Montana. His father, Alexander Countryman, was the under sheriff of Musselshell County and his mother, Carrie Harriman, a homemaker. The family moved to Longview, Washington, where Vern excelled at high school athletics and was class president both his junior and senior years.

In 1939, he was graduated with a B.A. in political science from the University of Washington and was inducted into Phi Beta Kappa. In 1942, he graduated from the University of Washington Law School, where he was president of the Washington Law Review editorial board (overlapping with Donald R. Colvin).

On November 9, 1940, he married Vera Marie Pound (July 19, 1917 – December 2, 1994), with whom he had two daughters: Debra Green and Kay Briggs. Like Vern, Vera was born in a small town in Montana (Washoe) and had moved to Longview, Washington, with her family.

== Legal career ==
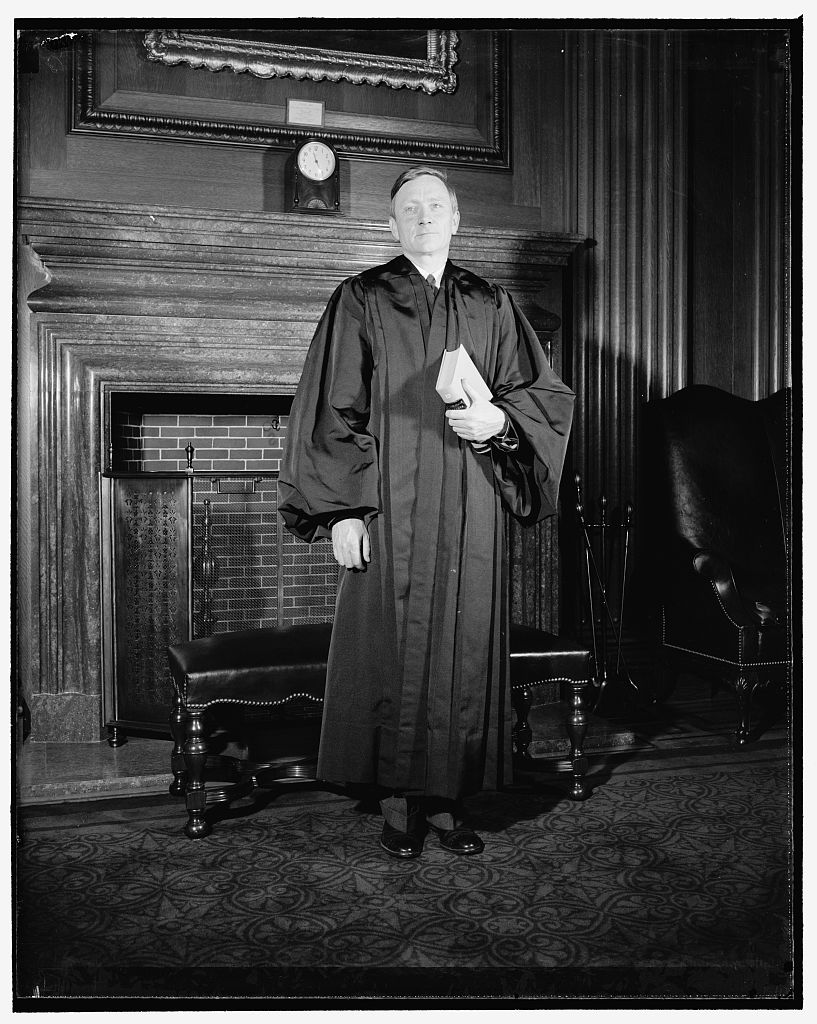
William O. Douglas

Countryman worked as an attorney with the National Labor Relations Board in Seattle before serving as a clerk from 1942 to 1943 for Justice William O. Douglas (October 16, 1898 – January 19, 1980) of the U.S. Supreme Court. He then served with the Army Air Force in Italy during World War II, rising to First Lieutenant. After his discharge in 1946, he served as Assistant Attorney General of Washington State and, from 1946 to 1947, as an instructor at the University of Washington Law School.

In 1947-48, Countryman was a graduate student at Yale Law School before joining the faculty. He was an assistant professor of law from 1948 to 1950 and an associate professor from 1950 to 1955.

Countryman was a prominent bankruptcy scholar, following in the footsteps of Wesley Sturges (November 3, 1893-November 1962) and his mentor, William O. Douglas. His casebook with J. William Moore, Debtors' and Creditors' Rights: Cases and Materials, which was first published in 1947 and went through four editions by 1975, "took a novel approach to the subject, by providing the evolution of both the non-bankruptcy and bankruptcy systems of creditors' remedies, thereby facilitating a comparative evaluation of their merits."

== Conflict with Washington State's Canwell Committee ==
While at Yale, Countryman wrote a number of articles on creditor and debtor rights and one book, Un-American Activities in the State of Washington: The Work of the Canwell Committee (1951), which was an attack on that state's version of the House Un-American Activities Committee; the Canwell Committee purged the University of Washington faculty of communist sympathizers.

Countryman was denied tenure by Yale, despite the Law School faculty's positive recommendation, because of that book, which the university President, A. Whitney Griswold (October 27, 1906 – April 19, 1963), was said to have considered of insufficient academic quality to merit tenure. Many faculty members, however, believed the decision was based on Countryman's left-wing politics and the tenure denial was therefore a cause célèbre. Yale offered an extension of Countryman's contract to improve his scholarly output for reconsideration, but he resigned instead.

In the early 1950s, Countryman also locked horns with leading commentators in his promotion of free speech. Conservative author William F. Buckley, Jr. (November 24, 1925 – February 27, 2008), called Countryman's 1952 critique of God and Man at Yale a close runner up to "the most acidulous review of the lot."

From 1955 to 1959 Countryman practiced law as a partner with Shea, Greenman & Gardner in Washington, D.C., before becoming Dean of the University of New Mexico School of Law in 1959.

In 1959, he published a collection of opinions by Justice Douglas prefaced by a brief biographical sketch. The opinions span the spectrum of individual freedom and the application of the Bill of Rights.

== Professor at Harvard Law School ==
In 1964, Countryman accepted an offer to become a professor at Harvard Law School. At Harvard, he advocated the rights of debtors. He was also a specialist in commercial law, secured transactions law and civil liberties. In 1973, he was named the "Royall Professor of Law," the oldest professorship at the law school. In 1987, he became a professor emeritus.

He was a founding trustee of the National Consumer Law Center, which annually presents the "Vern Countryman Award" to honor lawyers who have contributed to the rights and welfare of low-income consumers.

== Photos ==
- Demonstration at Faneuil Hall to protest indictment of the Berrigan brothers: Noam Chomsky speaking with Vern Countryman and George Wald at left and Howard Zinn at the far right, January 1971 (Photo: Jeff Albertson Photograph Collection (PH 57)), Special Collections and University Archives, Library of the University of Massachusetts: Amherst.

== Selected writings ==
=== Books ===
Countryman, Vern (1951). Un-American Activities in the State of Washington: The Work of the Canwell Committee. Ithaca, NY: Cornell University Press. ISBN 978-1-117-93112-8, ISBN 978-1-117-93112-8.

---, James William Moore (1947). Debtors' and Creditors' Rights (Albany, NY: Matthew Bender & Co.).

--- (1974). The Judicial Record of Justice William O. Douglas. Cambridge, MA: Harvard University Press. ISBN 978-0-674-28481-4.

---, Ted Finman and Theodore J. Schneyer (1976). The Lawyer in Modern Society. New York, NY: Little, Brown & Co. ISBN 978-0-316-15800-8, ISBN 978-0-316-15800-8.

---, Andrew Kaufman and Zipporah Wiseman (1982). Commercial Law: Cases and Materials (Law School Casebook (series)). New York, NY: Little Brown & Co. ISBN 978-0-316-15796-4.

---, Jack F. Williams and Frank R. Kennedy (2000). Countryman & Williams on Partnerships, Limited Liability Entities and S Corporations in Bankruptcy (series). Aspen Law & Business. ISBN 978-0-7355-1358-7, ISBN 978-0-7355-1358-7.

=== Articles ===
---, "The Organized Musicians (Part I)," 16 U. Chi. L. Rev. 56 (1948).

---, The Organized Musicians (Part II), 16 U. Chi. L. Rev. 239 (1949).

---, "For a New Exemption Policy in Bankruptcy" part of the Symposium on Bankruptcy: Current Problems of Administration: Part II, 14 Rutgers L. Rev. 678 (1959–1960).

---, "Clear and Present Danger, a review of The Committee by Walter Goodman (Farrar, Straus and Giroux)," New York Review of Books, December 5, 1968.

---, "The Russians are Coming!, a review of The FBI in Our Open Society by Harry Overstreet and Bonaro Overstreet (Norton)," New York Review of Books, July 31, 1969

---, "Why a State Bill of Rights?" 45 Wash. L. Rev. 453 (1970).

---, "The Use of State Law in Bankruptcy Cases (pts. 1 & 2)", 47 N.Y.U. L. Rev. 407, 631 (1972).

---, "Executory Contracts in Bankruptcy: Part I," 57 Minn. L. Rev. 439 (1973).

---, "Bankruptcy and the Individual Debtor – And a Modest Proposal to Return to the Seventeenth Century," 32 Cath. U. L. Rev. 809 (1983).

=== Interviews ===
- "The Growing inability to dissent, a discussion with Vern Countryman". KPFA, April 11, 1968 (Civil liberties attorney discusses the increasing pressure to curtail free speech in America.)

== See also ==
- List of law clerks for the fourth seat of the Supreme Court of the United States
