= Parental alienation syndrome =

Purported childhood mental disorder

Parental alienation syndrome (PAS) is a term introduced by child psychiatrist Richard Gardner in 1985 to describe signs and symptoms he believed to be exhibited by children who have been alienated from one parent through manipulation by the other parent. Proposed symptoms included extreme but unwarranted fear, and disrespect or hostility towards a parent. Gardner believed that a set of behaviors that he observed in some families involved in child custody litigation could be used to diagnose psychological manipulation or undue influence of a child by a parent, typically by the other parent who may be attempting to prevent an ongoing relationship between a child and other family members after family separation or divorce. Use of the term "syndrome" has not been accepted by either the medical or legal communities and Gardner's research has been broadly criticized by legal and mental health scholars for lacking scientific validity and reliability.

== Initial description ==
Parental alienation syndrome is a term coined by child psychiatrist Richard A. Gardner drawing upon his clinical experiences in the early 1980s. The concept of one parent attempting to separate their child from the other parent as punishment or part of a divorce have been described since at least the 1940s, but Gardner was the first to define a specific syndrome. In his 1985 paper, he defined PAS as

...a disorder that arises primarily in the context of child-custody disputes. Its primary manifestation is the child's campaign of denigration against the parent, a campaign that has no justification. The disorder results from the combination of indoctrinations by the alienating parent and the child's own contributions to the vilification of the alienated parent.

He also stated that the indoctrination may be deliberate or unconscious on the part of the alienating parent. Gardner initially believed that parents (usually mothers) made false accusations of child abuse and sexual abuse against the other parent (usually fathers) in order to prevent further contact between them. While Gardner initially described the mother as the alienator in 90% of PAS cases, he later stated both parents were equally likely to alienate. He also later stated that in his experience accusations of sexual abuse were not present in the vast majority of cases of PAS.

== Characteristics ==
Gardner described PAS as a preoccupation by the child with criticism and deprecation of a parent. Gardner stated that PAS occurs when, in the context of child custody disputes, one parent deliberately or unconsciously attempts to alienate a child from the other parent. According to Gardner, PAS is characterized by a cluster of eight symptoms that appear in the child. These include a campaign of denigration and hatred against the targeted parent; weak, absurd, or frivolous rationalizations for this deprecation and hatred; lack of the usual ambivalence about the targeted parent; strong assertions that the decision to reject the parent is theirs alone (the "independent-thinker phenomenon"); reflexive support of the favored parent in the conflict; lack of guilt over the treatment of the alienated parent; use of borrowed scenarios and phrases from the alienating parent; and the denigration not just of the targeted parent but also to that parent's extended family and friends. Despite frequent citations of these factors in scientific literature, the value ascribed to these factors has not been explored with professionals in the field.

Gardner and others divided PAS into mild, moderate and severe levels. The number and severity of the eight symptoms included in the syndrome were hypothesized to increase through the different levels. Recommendations for management differed according to the severity level of the child's symptoms. While a diagnosis of PAS is made based on the child's symptoms, Gardner stated that any change in custody should be based primarily on the symptom level of the alienating parent.

In mild cases, it was alleged that there was some parental programming against the targeted parent, but little or no disruption of visitation, and Gardner did not recommend court-ordered visitation.

In moderate cases, it was alleged that more parental programming occurred resulting in greater resistance to visits with the targeted parent. Gardner recommended that primary custody remain with the programming parent if the brainwashing was expected to be discontinued, but if not, that custody should be transferred to the targeted parent. In addition, therapy with the child to stop alienation and remediate the damaged relationship with the targeted parent was recommended.

In severe cases, in which children were found to display most or all of the eight symptoms and refused to visit the targeted parent, possibly threatening to run away or engage in self-harm if forced to visit the other parent, Gardner recommended that the child be removed from the alienating parent's home into a transition home before moving into the home of the targeted parent.

In addition to modification of custody, Gardner recommended therapy for the child. Gardner's proposed intervention for moderate and severe PAS, which include court-ordered transfer to the alienated parent, fines, house arrest, and incarceration, have been critiqued for their punitive nature towards the alienating parent and alienated child, and for the risk of abuse of power and violation of their civil rights. With time, Gardner revised his views and expressed less support for the most aggressive management strategies.

== Reception ==
Gardner's original formulation, which labeled mothers almost exclusively as the alienating parent, was endorsed by fathers' rights groups, as it allowed fathers to explain the reluctance of their children to visit them and assign blame to their former wives. In contrast, women's groups criticized the syndrome, concerned that it permitted abusers to claim that allegations of abuse by mother or child were reflective of brainwashing. Gardner himself emphasized that PAS only applied in situations where there was no actual abuse or neglect had not occurred, but by 1998, noted an increase in the awareness of PAS had led to an increase in its misapplication as an exculpatory legal maneuver.

PAS has been cited in high-conflict divorce and child custody cases, particularly as a defense against accusations of domestic violence or sexual abuse. The status of the syndrome, and thus its admissibility in the testimony of experts, has been the subject of dispute, with challenges raised about its acceptance by professionals in the field, whether it follows a scientific methodology that is testable, whether it has been tested and has a known error rate, and the extent to which the theory has been published and peer-reviewed.

PAS has not been accepted by experts in psychology, child advocacy or the study of child abuse or legal scholars. PAS has been extensively criticized by members of the legal and mental health community, who state that PAS should not be admissible in child custody hearings based on both science and law.

No professional association has recognized PAS as a relevant medical syndrome or mental disorder. PAS is not listed in the International Statistical Classification of Diseases and Related Health Problems of the WHO. It is not recognized by the American Medical Association or the American Psychiatric Association. The American Psychological Association declined to give a position on PAS, but raised concerns over its lack of supporting data and how the term is used. The APA's 1996 Presidential Task Force on Violence and the Family expressed concern that custody evaluators use PAS as a means of giving custody to fathers despite a history of violence, a concern shared by other commentators. The United States National Council of Juvenile and Family Court Judges rejected PAS, recommending it not be used for the consideration of child-custody issues.

The admissibility of PAS was rejected by an expert review panel and the Court of Appeal of England and Wales in the United Kingdom and Canada's Department of Justice recommends against its use. PAS has been mentioned in some family court cases in the United States. Gardner portrayed PAS as well accepted by the judiciary and having set a variety of precedents, but legal analysis of the actual cases indicates that as of 2006 this claim was incorrect.

=== Exclusion from the DSM ===
PAS is not included in the American Psychiatric Association's Diagnostic and Statistical Manual of Mental Disorders (DSM-IV). Gardner and others lobbied for its inclusion in the DSM-V revision. In 2001, Gardner argued that when the DSM-IV was released, there was insufficient research to include PAS, but since then, there have been enough scientific articles and attention to PAS that it merited being taken seriously.

A survey of American custody evaluators, published in 2007, found that half of the respondents disagreed with its inclusion, while a third thought it should be. A related formulation, named parental alienation disorder, has been proposed, suggesting that inclusion of PAS in the DSM-5 would promote research and appropriate treatment, as well as reduce misuse of a valid and reliable construct. In December 2012, the American Psychiatric Association announced that PAS would not be included in the DSM-V revision. However, there are now diagnoses included in DSM-V that reflect the impact of parental behavior upon children, in particular parent-child relational problem and child affected by parental relationship distress. The key distinction is that the diagnoses listed in the DSM relate to the mental health of the diagnosed individual, as opposed to attempting to describe a disorder of the relationship between different people, whether parent-child or parent-parent.

=== Scientific status ===
Gardner's formulation of PAS is critiqued as lacking a scientific basis, and as a hypothesis whose proponents have failed to meet the scientific burden of proof to merit acceptance. The first publications about PAS were self-published and not peer reviewed, and though subsequent articles have been published in peer-reviewed journals, most have consisted of anecdotal evidence in the form of case studies; in addition, the limited research into PAS has lacked evidence of its validity and reliability. The lack of objective research and replication, falsifiability, and independent publication has led to claims that PAS is pseudoscience or junk science. Proponents of PAS concur that large scale systematic controlled studies into PAS's validity and reliability are required, supplementing a single small study in 2004 which suggested practitioners could come to a consensus based on written reports.

The theoretical foundation of PAS has been described as incomplete, simplistic and erroneous for ignoring the multiple factors (including the behaviors of the child, parents and other family members) that may contribute to parental alienation, family dysfunction and a breakdown in attachment between a parent and a child. In this view, PAS confuses a child's developmental reaction to a divorce with psychosis, vastly overstates the number of false allegations of child sexual abuse, ignores the scientific literature suggesting most allegations of child sexual abuse are well founded and thus well-meaning efforts to protect a child from an abusive parent, exaggerates the damaging effects of parental alienation on children and proposes an unsupported and endangering remedy for PAS. Concern has been expressed that PAS lacks adequate scientific support to be considered a syndrome and that Gardner has promoted PAS as a syndrome based on a vague clustering of behaviors. Despite concerns about the validity of testimony regarding PAS, it has been inappropriately viewed as reliable by family court judges. Proponents of PAS and others agree that using the designation of syndrome may be inappropriate as it implies more scientific legitimacy than it currently deserves.

While PAS is not accepted as scientifically valid, the concept of parental alienation has been advanced based upon theories of the "alienated child" and the dynamics that may have contributed to the child's alienation from a parent. Like PAS, parental alienation is not recognized as a diagnosable mental condition.

=== Clinical status ===
PAS has been criticized for making clinical work with children who are alienated more confusing and for labeling children with a mental diagnosis who may react angrily to their parents' separation or divorce. Gardner's analysis has been criticized for inappropriately assigning all responsibility of the child's behavior to one parent when the child's behavior is oftentimes, but not always, the result of a dynamic in which both parents and the child play a role.

Gardner disagreed with criticism of PAS as overly simplistic, stating that while there are a wide variety of causes on why a child may become alienated from a parent, the primary etiological factor in cases of PAS is the brainwashing parent, and that otherwise, there is no PAS. Gardner also stated that those initially critical of PAS for being a caricature were not directly involved with families in custody disputes and that criticisms of this nature faded by the late 1980s because the disorder was widespread. However, no scientific study has yet demonstrated that the elements of PAS are unique to alleged parental alienation such that they are useful for diagnosis.

PAS has been criticized by for being sexist, being used by fathers to marginalize legitimate fears and concerns about abuse, and women's groups and others oppose the legitimacy of PAS as a danger to children. After his initial publications, Gardner revised his theory to make fathers and mothers equally likely to alienate or be indoctrinators and disagreed that recognition of PAS is sexist. Gardner later indicated he believed men were equally likely to be PAS indoctrinators. Studies of children and adults labelled with PAS have suggested that mothers were more likely than fathers to be the alienator.

== In courts ==
=== Canada ===
Early Canadian court cases accepted expert opinions about PAS, used the term "syndrome" and concurred with Gardner's theory that only one parent was fully responsible for it. Gardner testified in one case (Fortin v. Major, 1996) but the court did not accept his opinion, concluding that the child was not alienated based on the evaluation of a court-appointed expert who, unlike Gardner, had met with the family members. More recent cases, while accepting the concept of alienation, have noted the lack of recognition in the DSM-IV, and have generally avoided "syndrome" terminology, emphasizing that changes in custody are stressful for the child and should only occur in the most severe cases. A 2006 research report by the Canadian Department of Justice described PAS as "empirically unsupported" and favored a different framework for dealing with issues of alienation that has more research support. Decisions about possible parental alienation are considered a legal decision, to be determined by the judge based on the facts of the case, rather than a diagnosis made by a mental health professional. There is recognition that rejection of a parent is a complex issue, and that a distinction must be made between pathological alienation and reasonable estrangement.

=== Germany ===
In Germany, the Federal Constitutional Court held in 2023 that PAS was an outdated concept and considered disproved in the scientific community. In 2025 the court again corrected lower courts for relying on findings, brought by a supposed expert, which potentially diagnosed PAS.

=== United Kingdom ===
In the United Kingdom, the admissibility concerning the evaluation of PAS was rejected both in an expert review, and by the Court of Appeal.

=== United States ===
On occasion, PAS has been cited as part of the child custody determination process in the United States, and some courts have awarded sole custody to one parent based upon findings of PAS. In some cases a custody court's acceptance of allegations of parental alienation have resulted in children being placed in the custody of an abusive parent.

The admissibility of testimony alleging PAS has been challenged under the Frye test and Daubert standard, to evaluate if it has sufficient scientific basis and acceptance within the scientific community.

==== Richard Gardner's claims ====
Although Gardner claimed that PAS was generally accepted by the scholarly community and had passed the Frye test in two states, a 2006 analysis of court cases involving PAS and cited by Gardner concluded that these decisions did not set legal precedent, that PAS is viewed negatively in most legal scholarship, and that Gardner's writings do not support the existence of PAS. Of sixty-four precedent-bearing cases reviewed at that time, only two decisions, both in New York State and both in criminal courts actually set precedents. Both held that the theory of PAS was inadmissible. One of the cases, subsequently upheld on appeal, found that PAS failed the Frye test as the appropriate professional community did not generally accept.

At the time, Gardner listed fifty cases on his website that he claimed set precedents that made PAS admissible. Upon review it was determined that none of the cases set precedents for the admissibility of PAS. forty-six set no precedents or did not discuss admissibility and the remaining four were problematic. In the first the trial court found that PAS passed the Frye test, but that finding was not reviewed on appeal so as to become precedential as the trial court "[threw] out the words 'parental alienation syndrome'" and focused instead on the "willingness and ability of each parent to facilitate and encourage a close and continuing relationship between the parents and the child" under the state's child custody best interest factors. In the second case, the appellate court did not discuss PAS. The third case specifically chose not to discuss the admissibility of PAS and the fourth made no decision on PAS.

==== Case law ====
In one New York case, Matter of Robert Coull v. Pamela Rottman, 15 N.Y.S.3d 834, 131 AD 3d 964 (2015), child support was suspended based upon a trial court's finding of a parent's alienating behaviors. The court found that the father was prevented from seeing his son by the child's mother through a "pattern of alienation", and child support was suspended on that basis. The decision was not based upon a psychological diagnosis, but was instead based upon a pattern of alienation actions and behaviors by the mother and her conduct during court proceedings.

A focus on parental behavior allows a court to base its decision "upon accepted psychological concepts and diagnoses... without mention of the controversial and potentially inflammatory concept of PAS"; New York has followed this approach, with a court explaining,

PAS, essentially dismissed as "junk science", is not generally accepted in the scientific community, as it is not an approved term or diagnosis in the field of psychiatry and no New York court has allowed the admission of testimony concerning PAS.... However, New York Courts have embraced parental alienation as a concept. In recognizing that parental alienation can exist, some courts have loosely defined it as a custodial parent's active interference with or deliberate and unjustified frustration of the non-custodial parents' reasonable right of access to the child.

That approach treats parental alienation as a descriptive concept, allowing a court to consider parental behavior without the need to determine whether parental alienation is a valid psychological construct.

== See also ==
- Child abuse
- Family estrangement
- Gatekeeper parent
- Parental alienation
- Parentification
- Richard A. Gardner
- Triangulation (psychology)
