= Index of masculism topics =

This is a list of topics related to the issue of masculism, men's liberation, the men's movement, and men's rights:

- Airline sex discrimination policy controversy
- Alimony
- Antifeminism
- Arranged marriage
- Blood Feud
- Body shape
- Boy
- Boys are stupid, throw rocks at them! controversy
- Bimisandry
- Chauvinism
- Circumcision
- Conflict tactics scale
- Dating abuse
- Deadbeat parent
- Discrimination
- Domestic violence
  - Domestic violence against men
- Dominator culture
- Double burden
- Economic inequality
- Educational attainment in the United States by Sex
- Egalitarianism
- Equal Rights Amendment
- Estimates of sexual violence
- Factors associated with being a victim of sexual violence
- Warren Farrell
- Fathers' rights movement
  - Fathers' rights movement by country
    - Fathers' rights movement in Australia
    - Fathers' rights movement in Italy
    - Fathers' rights movement in the United Kingdom
    - Fathers' rights movement in the United States
- Feminist Sex Wars
- Forced circumcision
- Forced marriage
- Forced Fatherhood
- Gender archaeology
- Gender binary
- Gender crime
- Gender discrimination
- Gender equality
- Gender history
- Gender identity
- Gender inequality
- Gender mainstreaming
- Gender differences in suicide
- Gender marking in job titles
- Gender-neutral language
- Gender neutrality in English
- Gender performativity
- Gender role
- Gender roles in Islam
- Gender studies
- Gendercide
- Todd Goldman (David and Goliath clothing)
- Groom kidnapping
- Gynocentrism
- Homemaking
- Human male sexuality
- Human sex ratio
- Income inequality in the United States
- Initiatives to prevent sexual violence
- International Men's Day
- John school
- Male bonding
- Movember
- Male–female income disparity in the United States
- Male expendability
- Female privilege
- Man
- MenToo movement
- Marriage of convenience
- Marianism
- Masculinity
- Masculism
- Men and feminism
- Men in nursing
- Men's health
- Men's liberation
- Men's movement
- Men's rights movement
  - Men's rights movement in India
- Men's shelter
- Men's studies
- Misandry
- Mixed-sex education
- Mythopoetic men's movement
- Objectification
- Occupational segregation
- Occupational sexism
- Paper Abortion
- Parental alienation syndrome
- Paternal bond
- Paternal rights and abortion
- Paternalism
- Paternity fraud
- Dowtry Laws
- Patrilocal residence
- Philandry
- Pro-feminism
- Reproductive justice
- Reproductive rights
- Reverse discrimination
- Salic law
- Sentencing disparity
- Sex and the law
- Sex differences in crime
- Sex differences in humans
- Sex in advertising
- Sex segregation
- Sexism
- Sexual harassment
- Sexual objectification
- Sexual revolution
- Sexual violence
- Sociology of fatherhood
- Sociology of gender
- Sperm theft
- Stay-at-home dad
- Tender years doctrine
- Testosterone poisoning
- Transmisandry
- Victorian masculinity
- Virility
- Women-are-wonderful effect
- Womb and vagina envy
- Women-only passenger car
