= Feminism in the United Kingdom =

In the United Kingdom, as in other countries, feminism seeks to establish political, social, and economic equality for women. The history of feminism in Britain dates back to the very beginnings of feminism itself, as many of the earliest feminist writers and activists—such as Mary Wollstonecraft, Barbara Bodichon, and Lydia Becker—were British.

== 19th century ==
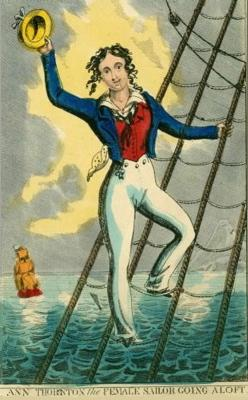
Ann Thornton Going Aloft, c. 1835

An organised movement for British women's suffrage was part of the Langham Place Group of the 1850s, led by Barbara Bodichon (née Leigh-Smith) and Bessie Rayner Parkes. They also campaigned for improved women’s rights in the law, employment, education, and marriage.

Property-owning women and widows had been allowed to vote in some local elections, but that ended in 1835. The Chartist Movement of 1838 to 1857 was a large-scale demand for suffrage-however, it only gave suffrage to men over 21. In 1851 the Sheffield Female Political Association was founded and submitted an unsuccessful petition calling for women's suffrage to the House of Lords. This probably inspired British feminist Harriet Taylor Mill to write the pro-women's-suffrage The Enfranchisement of Women (1851). On 7 June 1866 a petition from 1,499 women calling for women's suffrage was presented to the Parliament, but it also did not succeed.

Upper-class women could exert a little backstage political influence in high society. However, in divorce cases, rich women lost control of their children.

=== Careers ===
Ambitious middle-class women faced enormous challenges when they proposed entering suitable careers, such as nursing, teaching, law, and medicine, and the loftier their ambition, the greater the challenge. Physicians barred admission to the medical profession; there were a few opportunities for women lawyers, but none as clerics. White collar business opportunities outside family-owned shops were few until clerical positions opened in the 20th century. Florence Nightingale demonstrated the necessity of professional nursing and warfare, and set up an educational system that tracked women into that field in the second half of the nineteenth century. Teaching was not quite as easy to break into, but the low salaries were less of the barrier to the single woman than to the married man. By the late 1860s a number of schools were preparing women for careers as governesses or teachers. The census reported in 1851 that 70,000 women in England and Wales were teachers, compared to the 170,000 who comprised three-fourths of all teachers in 1901. The great majority came from lower middle class origins. The National Union of Women Teachers (NUWT) originated in the early 20th century inside the male-controlled National Union of Teachers (NUT). It demanded equal pay with male teachers, and eventually broke away. Both Oxford and Cambridge minimized the role of women, allowing small all-female colleges to operate. However the new redbrick universities and the other major cities were open to women.

Medicine was the greatest challenge, with the most systematic resistance by the physicians, and the fewest women breaking through. One route to entry was to go to the United States where there were suitable schools for women as early as 1850. Britain was one of the last countries to train women physicians, so 80 to 90% of the British women departed to America for their medical degrees. Edinburgh University admitted a few women in 1869, then reversed itself in 1873, leaving a strong negative reaction among British medical educators. The first separate school for women physicians opened in London in 1874 to a handful of students. Scotland was more open. Coeducation had to wait until the World War.

By the end of the nineteenth century, women had secured equality of status in most spheres – except for the vote and the holding of office.

=== Child custody ===
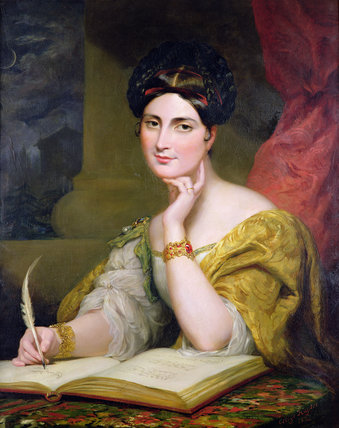
Caroline Norton helped change the family law which before 1839 deprived women of a legal relationship with their children

Under traditional common law, children were considered to belong to their father, who had full legal rights over them, both during and after the dissolution of a marriage. Before 1839, after a divorce, women lost control of their children, as those children would continue to live in the family unit with the father, who, as head of the household, continued to be responsible for them. Caroline Norton was one such woman; her personal tragedy where she was denied access to her three sons after a divorce led her to a life of intense campaigning which successfully led to the passing of the Custody of Infants Act 1839 and paved the way for the tender years doctrine for child custody arrangement. The act gave women, for the first time, a right to their children and gave some discretion to the judge in child custody cases. The Custody of Infants Act 1839 permitted a mother to petition the courts for custody of her children up to the age of seven and for access in respect of older children, maintaining the responsibility for financial support to the father.

The Custody of Infants Act 1873, passed by the Parliament due to additional pressure from women, extended the maternal right to petition for custody to children under sixteen. The doctrine spread in many states of the world because of the British Empire.

In divorce cases in the 19th century, a woman found guilty of adultery lost not only custody but also access (visitation) to her children. This is exemplified by a ruling by Sir C. Cresswell in 1862, stating that: "It will probably have a salutary effect on the interests of public morality, that it should be known that a woman, if found guilty of adultery, will forfeit, as far as this Court is concerned, all right to the custody of or access to her children."

The Guardianship of Infants Act 1886 made it easier for mothers to become guardians of the children after their father's death.

A slightly less punitive approach towards adulterous mothers was made possible by Mozley Stark v Mozley Stark and Hitchins (1910, Court of Appeal).

Before 1923, male and female adultery were legally treated differently (see section below).

Custody rights were relevant not only with regard to divorce, but also with regard to the legal rights of parents who were married (regarding decisions about children, which included the right of a father to separate a child from the mother, for example by the father sending the child to live abroad). Originally, the father alone had such rights, as the common law gave only the father the right to make decisions about the upbringing of a legitimate child. Mothers' rights gradually improved, especially with the passage of the Guardianship of Infants Act 1925, but it was only in 1973 that full equality was obtained.

=== Divorce ===
In Britain, before 1857, the dissolution of a marriage was nearly impossible, being de facto restricted to the very wealthy, as it demanded either a complex annulment process or a private bill leading to an act of Parliament, with great costs for either. The latter entailed sometimes lengthy debates about a couple's intimate marital relationship in public in the House of Commons. Obtaining a divorce was very difficult, and there were only 314 divorces between 1700 and 1857, corresponding to a rate of two divorces a year. Traditionally, poor people used desertion, and (for poor men) even the practice of selling wives in the market, as a substitute for divorce.

The first key legislative change came with the Matrimonial Causes Act 1857. It passed over the strenuous opposition of the highly traditional Church of England. The new law made divorce a civil affair of the courts, rather than a Church matter, with a new civil court in London handling all cases. The process was still quite expensive, at about £40, but now became feasible for the middle class. A woman who obtained a judicial separation took the status of a feme sole, with full control of her own civil rights. Additional amendments came in 1878, which allowed for separations handled by local justices of the peace. The Church of England blocked further reforms until the final breakthrough came with the Matrimonial Causes Act 1973.

Before the Matrimonial Causes Act 1923, a man could divorce on the ground of a wife's adultery, but a woman could only divorce by proving a husband's adultery aggravated by other misconduct (e.g. adultery and cruelty).

The Matrimonial Causes Act 1937 broadened the grounds for divorce, adding additional reasons for which a divorce could be granted.

The Divorce Reform Act 1969 was the first divorce law to allow no fault divorce (on the ground of having lived separate and apart).

=== Limitations to women's rights in family law ===
The 19th century was a period of major legal changes in family law, which improved women's legal status, but there were also numerous limitations, in law and in practice, which prevented women from obtaining these rights. The Custody of Infants Act 1839 was the first law to give mothers legal rights to their children, eroding the absolute rights of the father, but it made little difference in practice given that the act explicitly banned adulterous women from applying for custody or access, at a time when most divorces were granted on the grounds of women's adultery (before the Matrimonial Causes Act 1937 the only ground for divorce was adultery, although judicial separation could be granted on other grounds too). Women in the 19th century were rarely successful in obtaining a divorce initiated by them, especially before 1857, when divorce required an act of Parliament; only four acts of Parliament for divorces were granted on the application of women during that period of the 19th century. Before the Matrimonial Causes Act 1923, male and female adultery were treated differently, with men being able to divorce solely on the ground of adultery, but women having to prove adultery aggravated by additional misconduct. This led to situations where in cases of a woman's adultery, the custody of the child would be given to the father regardless of the father's conduct. Although the Custody of Infants Act 1873 no longer made any reference to a mother's adultery, theoretically allowing mothers divorced due to adultery to obtain rights to the children, the traditional view that such mothers should be completely removed from their children's life and denied any access to the child continued to be applied by the courts until the early 20th century. The emphasis on women's morality in Victorian England often put women in vulnerable situations, where they could lose rights to their children if it was deemed that their behavior was inappropriate. For example Annie Wood Besant lost custody of her daughter because of her allegedly immoral social activism.

Women had very little protection from domestic violence, as traditional common law had given husbands a right to chastisement. Traditional homicide laws which were in force before the Offences against the Person Act 1828 differentiated between homicide committed by a husband against his wife (which was classed as murder) and homicide committed by a woman against her husband (which was classed as petty treason and was a crime more severe than murder, because it was seen as threatening the hierarchical social order, and for women it incurred burning at stake).

Women who were victims of their husband's violence were finally given protection under the Matrimonial Causes Act 1878, which allowed them to obtain a judicial separation (not divorce) and to obtain custody of their children.

The preoccupation with women's morality and sexuality meant that women perceived to violate social norms risked being sent to lunatic asylums. The men who were in charge of these women, either a husband, father or brother, could easily send these women to mental institutions, stating that they believed that these women were mentally ill because of their nonconformist behaviors. Based on her study of cases from the Homewood Retreat, Cheryl Krasnick Warsh concludes that "the realities of the household in late Victorian and Edwardian middle class society rendered certain elements—socially redundant women in particular—more susceptible to institutionalization than others."

=== Prostitution ===
Bullough argues that prostitution in 18th-century Britain was a convenience to men of all social statuses, and economic necessity for many poor women, and was tolerated by society. The evangelical movement of the nineteenth century denounced the prostitutes and their clients as sinners, and denounced society for tolerating it. Prostitution, according to the values of the Victorian middle-class, was a horrible evil, for the young women, for the men, and for all of society. Parliament in the 1860s in the Contagious Diseases Acts ("CD") adopted the French system of licensed prostitution. The "regulationist policy" was to isolate, segregate, and control prostitution. The main goal was to protect working men, soldiers and sailors near ports and army bases from catching venereal disease. Young women officially became prostitutes and were trapped for life in the system. After a nationwide crusade led by Josephine Butler and the Ladies National Association for the Repeal of the Contagious Diseases Acts, Parliament repealed the acts in 1886 and ended legalised prostitution. The age of consent for young women was raised from 12 to 16, undercutting the supply of young prostitutes who were in highest demand. The new moral code meant that respectable men dared not be caught.

=== Protection for rich and poor women ===
A series of four laws each called the Married Women's Property Act passed Parliament from 1870 to 1893 effectively removed the restrictions that kept wealthy married women from controlling their own property. They now had practically equal status with their husbands, and a status superior to women anywhere else in Europe. Working-class women were protected by a series of laws passed on the assumption that they (like children) did not have full bargaining power and needed protection by the government. The Act did receive a great deal of criticism as many believed that "household harmony could only be achieved by the total subordination of women to their husband".

== 1900–1950 ==
The early 20th century, the Edwardian era, saw a loosening of Victorian rigidity and complacency: women had more employment opportunities and were more active. Many served worldwide in the British Empire or in Protestant missionary societies.

The Women's Social and Political Union (WSPU) was formed in 1903 by Emmeline Pankhurst to fight for women's rights to vote. Women had the vote in Australia, New Zealand and some of the American states. While WSPU was the most visible suffrage group, it was only one of many, such as the Women's Freedom League and the National Union of Women's Suffrage Societies (NUWSS) led by Millicent Garrett Fawcett.

In 1906, the Daily Mail first coined the term "suffragettes" as a form of ridicule, but the term was quickly embraced in Britain by women who used militant tactics in the cause of women's suffrage. The term became visible in distinctive green, purple, and white emblems, and the Artists' Suffrage League's dramatic graphics. Feminists learned to exploit photography and the media, and left a vivid visual record including images such as the 1914 photograph of Emmeline. Violence separated the moderates from the radicals led by the Pankhursts. The radicals themselves split; Emmeline and Christabel Pankhurst expelled Sylvia Pankhurst for insubordination and she formed her own group that was left-wing and oriented to broader issues affecting working-class women. It was first called the East London Federation of Suffragettes (ELFS), but over the years evolved politically and changed its name accordingly, first to the Women's Suffrage Federation and then to the Workers' Socialist Federation.

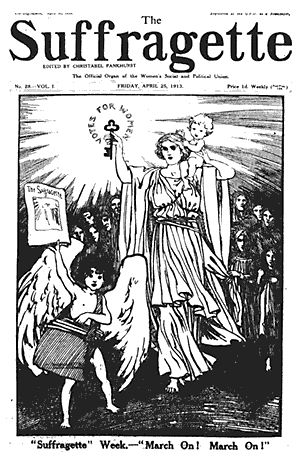
Cover of WSPU's The Suffragette, 25 April 1913 (after Delacroix's Liberty Leading the People, 1830)

The radical protests slowly became more violent, and included heckling, banging on doors, smashing shop windows, and arson. Emily Davison, a WSPU member, unexpectedly ran onto the track during the 1913 Epsom Derby and died under the king's horse. These tactics produced mixed results of sympathy and alienation. As many protesters were imprisoned and went on hunger-strike, the Liberal government was left with an embarrassing situation. From these political actions, the suffragists successfully created publicity around their institutional discrimination and sexism. Historians generally argue that the first stage of the militant suffragette movement under the Pankhursts in 1906 had a dramatic mobilizing effect on the suffrage movement. Women were thrilled and supportive of revolting in the streets; the membership of the militant WSPU and the older NUWSS overlapped and was mutually supportive. However a system of publicity, Ensor argues, had to continue to escalate to maintain its high visibility in the media. The hunger strikes and force-feeding did that. However the Pankhursts refused any advice and escalated their tactics. They turned to systematic disruption of Liberal Party meetings as well as physical violence in terms of damaging public buildings and arson. This went too far, as the overwhelming majority of suffragists pulled back and refused to follow because they could no longer defend the tactics. They increasingly repudiated the suffragettes as an obstacle to achieving suffrage, saying the militant suffragettes were now aiding the antis, and many historians agree. Searle says the methods of the suffragettes did succeed in damaging the Liberal party but failed to advance the cause of woman suffrage. When the Pankhursts decided to stop the militancy at the start of the war, and enthusiastically support the war effort, the movement split and their leadership role ended. Suffrage did come four years later, but the feminist movement in Britain permanently abandoned the militant tactics that had made the suffragettes famous.

The First World War advanced the feminist cause, as women's sacrifices and paid employment were much appreciated. Prime Minister David Lloyd George was clear about how important the women were:

It would have been utterly impossible for us to have waged a successful war had it not been for the skill and ardour, enthusiasm and industry which the women of this country have thrown into the war.

— David Lloyd George

The militant suffragette movement was suspended during the war and never resumed. British society credited the new patriotic roles women played as earning them the vote in 1918. However, British historians no longer emphasize the granting of woman suffrage as a reward for women's participation in war work. Pugh (1974) argues that enfranchising soldiers primarily and women secondarily was decided by senior politicians in 1916. In the absence of major women's groups demanding for equal suffrage, the government's conference recommended limited, age-restricted women's suffrage. The suffragettes had been weakened, Pugh argues, by repeated failures before 1914 and by the disorganising effects of war mobilization; therefore they quietly accepted these restrictions, which were approved in 1918 by a majority of the War Ministry and each political party in Parliament. More generally, Searle (2004) argues that the British debate was essentially over by the 1890s, and that granting the suffrage in 1918 was mostly a byproduct of giving the vote to male soldiers. Women in Britain finally achieved suffrage on the same terms as men in 1928.

The Sex Disqualification (Removal) Act 1919 received royal assent on 23 December 1919. The basic purpose of the act was, as stated in its long title, "... to amend the Law with respect to disqualification on account of sex", which it achieved in four short sections and one schedule. Its broad aim was achieved by section 1, which stated that:

A person shall not be disqualified by sex or marriage from the exercise of any public function, or from being appointed to or holding any civil or judicial office or post, or from entering or assuming or carrying on any civil profession or vocation, or for admission to any incorporated society (whether incorporated by Royal Charter or otherwise), [and a person shall not be exempted by sex or marriage from the liability to serve as a juror]…

The Crown was given the power to regulate the admission of women to the civil service by Orders in Council, and judges were permitted to control the gender composition of juries. By section 2, women were to be admitted as solicitors after serving three years only if they possessed a university degree which would have qualified them if male, or if they had fulfilled all the requirements of a degree at a university which did not, at the time, admit women to degrees. By section 3, no statute or charter of a university was to preclude university authorities from regulating the admission of women to membership or degrees. By section 4, any orders in council, royal charters, or statutory provisions which were inconsistent with this Act were to cease to have effect.

At the same time there was a relaxing of clothing restrictions on women; however, by 1920 there was negative talk about young women called "flappers" flaunting their sexuality.

The BBC had a marriage bar between 1932 and 1944, although it was a partial ban and was not fully enforced due to the BBC's ambivalent views on the policy.

The marriage bar was abolished in 1946 for the Home Civil Service; until then women were required to resign when they married.

Lloyds Bank had a marriage bar that also meant that female employees were classified as supplementary staff, rather than permanent. The bank abolished its marriage bar in 1949.

=== Electoral reform ===
The United Kingdom's Representation of the People Act 1918 gave near-universal suffrage to men, and suffrage to women over 30. The Representation of the People Act 1928 extended equal suffrage to both men and women. It also shifted the socioeconomic makeup of the electorate towards the working class, favouring the Labour Party, which was more sympathetic to women's issues. The 1918 election gave Labour the most seats in the house to date. The electoral reforms also allowed women to run for Parliament. Specifically, the Parliament (Qualification of Women) Act 1918 gave women over 21 the right to stand for election as an MP. Christabel Pankhurst narrowly failed to win a seat in 1918, but in 1919 and 1920, both Lady Astor and Margaret Wintringham won seats for the Conservatives and Liberals respectively by succeeding their husband's seats. Labour swept to power in 1924. Constance Markievicz (Sinn Féin) was the first woman elected in Ireland in 1918, but as an Irish nationalist, refused to take her seat. Astor's proposal to form a women's party in 1929 was unsuccessful. Women gained considerable electoral experience over the next few years as a series of minority governments ensured almost annual elections, but there were 12 women in Parliament by 1940. Close affiliation with Labour also proved to be a problem for the National Union of Societies for Equal Citizenship (NUSEC), which had little support in the Conservative party. However, their persistence with Conservative prime minister Stanley Baldwin was rewarded with the passage of the Representation of the People (Equal Franchise) Act 1928.

=== Social reform ===
The political change did not immediately change social circumstances. With the economic recession, women were the most vulnerable sector of the workforce. Some women who held jobs prior to the war were obliged to forfeit them to returning soldiers, and others were excessed. With limited franchise, the UK National Union of Women's Suffrage Societies (NUWSS) pivoted into a new organisation, the National Union of Societies for Equal Citizenship (NUSEC), which still advocated for equality in franchise, but extended its scope to examine equality in social and economic areas. Legislative reform was sought for discriminatory laws (e.g., family law and prostitution) and over the differences between equality and equity, the accommodations that would allow women to overcome barriers to fulfillment (known in later years as the "equality vs. difference conundrum"). Eleanor Rathbone, who became an MP in 1929, succeeded Millicent Garrett as president of NUSEC in 1919. She expressed the critical need for consideration of difference in gender relationships as "what women need to fulfill the potentialities of their own natures". The 1924 Labour government's social reforms created a formal split, as a splinter group of strict egalitarians formed the Open Door Council in May 1926. This eventually became an international movement, and continued until 1965. Other important social legislation of this period included the Sex Disqualification (Removal) Act 1919 (which opened professions to women), and the Matrimonial Causes Act 1923. In 1932, NUSEC separated advocacy from education, and continued the former activities as the National Council for Equal Citizenship and the latter as the Townswomen's Guild. The council continued until the end of the Second World War.

In 1921, Margaret Mackworth (Lady Rhondda) founded the Six Point Group, which included Rebecca West. As a political lobby group it aimed at political, occupational, moral, social, economic and legal equality. Thus it was ideologically allied with the Open Door Council, rather than National Council. It also lobbied at an international level, such as the League of Nations, and continued its work till 1983. In retrospect both ideological groups were influential in advancing women's rights in their own way. Despite women being admitted to the House of Commons from 1918, Mackworth, a Viscountess in her own right, spent a lifetime fighting to take her seat in the House of Lords against bitter opposition, a battle which only achieved its goal in the year of her death (1958). This revealed the weaknesses of the Sex Disqualification (Removal) Act. Mackworth also founded Time and Tide which became the group's journal, and to which West, Virginia Woolf, Rose Macaulay and many others contributed. A number of other women's periodicals also appeared in the 1920s, including Woman and Home, and Good Housekeeping, but whose content reflect very different aspirations. In 1925 Rebecca West wrote in Time and Tide something that reflected not only the movement's need to redefine itself post suffrage, but a continual need for re-examination of goals. "When those of our army whose voices are inclined to coolly tell us that the day of sex-antagonism is over and henceforth we have only to advance hand in hand with the male, I do not believe it."

=== Reproductive rights ===
In 1803 the United Kingdom enacted Lord Ellenborough's Act, making abortion after quickening a capital crime, and providing lesser penalties for the felony of abortion before quickening.

Annie Besant was tried in 1877 for publishing Charles Knowlton's Fruits of Philosophy, a work on family planning, under the Obscene Publications Act 1857. Knowlton had previously been convicted in the United States. She and her colleague Charles Bradlaugh were convicted but acquitted on appeal, the subsequent publicity resulting in a decline in the birth rate. Not discouraged in the slightest, Besant followed this with The Law of Population.

In 1929 the Infant Life (Preservation) Act 1929 was enacted; it created the offence of child destruction. It also amended the law so that an abortion carried out in good faith, for the sole purpose of preserving the life of the mother, would not be an offence.

In 1938 Dr. Aleck Bourne aborted the pregnancy of a young girl who had been raped by soldiers. Bourne was acquitted after turning himself in to authorities.

== 1950s – 21st century ==
1950s Britain is regarded as a bleak period for feminism. In the aftermath of World War II, a new emphasis was placed on companionate marriage and the nuclear family as a foundation of the new welfare state.

In 1951, the proportion of adult women who were (or had been) married was 75%; more specifically, 84.8% of women between the ages of 45 and 49 were married. At that time: “marriage was more popular than ever before.” In 1953, a popular book of advice for women states: “A happy marriage may be seen, not as a holy state or something to which a few may luckily attain, but rather as the best course, the simplest, and the easiest way of life for us all”.

While at the end of the war, childcare facilities were closed and assistance for working women became limited, the social reforms implemented by the new welfare state included family allowances meant to subsidize families, that is, to support women in the “capacity as wife and mother.” Sue Bruley argues that “the progressive vision of the New Britain of 1945 was flawed by a fundamentally conservative view of women”.

Women's commitment to companionate marriage was encouraged by the popular media: films, radio and popular women's magazines. In the 1950s, women's magazines had considerable influence on forming opinion in all walks of life, including the attitude to women's employment.

Nevertheless, 1950s Britain saw several strides towards the parity of women, such as equal pay required by law for women teachers (1952) and for women in the civil service (1954), thanks to activists like Edith Summerskill, who fought for women's causes both in parliament and in the traditional non-party pressure groups throughout the 1950s. Barbara Caine argues: “Ironically here, as with the vote, success was sometimes the worst enemy of organised feminism, as the achievement of each goal brought to an end the campaign which had been organised around it, leaving nothing in its place.”

The act allowed for the creation of female peers entitled to sit in the House of Lords. The first such women peers were four— Barbara Wootton and Stella Isaacs, who were sworn in on 21 October 1958, and Katharine Eliot and Irene Curzon, who took office the next day.

Feminist writers of that period, such as Alva Myrdal and Viola Klein, started to allow for the possibility that women should be able to combine home with outside employment. 1950s’ form of feminism is often derogatorily termed “welfare feminism.” Indeed, many activists went to great length to stress that their position was that of ‘reasonable modern feminism,’ which accepted sexual diversity, and sought to establish what women's social contribution was rather than emphasizing equality or the similarity of the sexes. Feminism in 1950s England was strongly connected to social responsibility and involved the well-being of society as a whole. This often came at the cost of the liberation and personal fulfillment of self-declared feminists. Even those women who regarded themselves as feminists strongly endorsed prevailing ideas about the primacy of children's needs, as advocated, for example, by John Bowlby the head of the Children's Department at the Tavistock Clinic, who published extensively throughout the 1950s and by Donald Winnicott who promoted through radio broadcasts and in the press the idea of the home as a private emotional world in which mother and child are bound to each other and in which the mother has control and finds freedom to fulfill herself.

=== A series of legislation and organising around women's rights ===
The birth control pill was introduced in the UK on the National Health Service in 1961 for married women only, and made available for all women with the NHS from 1967.

The Peerage Act 1963 granted suo jure hereditary women peers (other than those in the Peerage of Ireland) the right to sit in the House of Lords.

The Abortion Act 1967 is an act of the Parliament of the United Kingdom legalising abortions by registered practitioners, and regulating the tax-paid provision of such medical practices through the National Health Service. The Act made abortion legal in all of Great Britain (but not Northern Ireland) up to 28 weeks' gestation. In 1990, the law was amended by the Human Fertilisation and Embryology Act so that abortion was no longer legal after 24 weeks, except in cases where it was necessary to save the life of the woman, there was evidence of extreme fetal abnormality, or there was a grave risk of physical or mental injury to the woman. Furthermore, all abortion remains officially restricted to cases of maternal life, mental health, health, rape, fetal defects, and/or socioeconomic factors.

The Ford sewing machinists strike of 1968, led by Rose Boland, Eileen Pullen, Vera Sime, Gwen Davis, and Sheila Douglass, began because women sewing machinists, as part of a regrading exercise, were informed that their jobs were graded in Category B (less skilled production jobs), instead of Category C (more skilled production jobs), and that they would be paid 15% less than the full B rate received by men. At the time, it was common practice for companies to pay women less than men, irrespective of the skills involved. Following the intervention of Barbara Castle, the Secretary of State for Employment and Productivity in Harold Wilson's government, the strike ended three weeks after it began, as a result of a deal that immediately increased their rate of pay to 8% below that of men, rising to the full category B rate the following year. A court of inquiry (under the Industrial Courts Act 1919) was also set up to consider their regrading, although this failed to find in their favour. The women were only regraded into Category C following a further six-week strike in 1984. The 1968 strike was a trigger cause of the passing of the Equal Pay Act 1970. As well, inspired by the 1968 strike, women trades unionists founded the National Joint Action Campaign Committee for Women's Equal Rights (NJACCWER), which held an equal pay demonstration attended by 1,000 people in Trafalgar Square on 18 May 1969.

The Equal Pay Act 1970 is an act of the United Kingdom Parliament from 1970 which prohibits any less favourable treatment between women and men in terms of pay and conditions of employment. The act has now been mostly superseded by part 5, chapter 3, of the Equality Act 2010.

Refuge was founded in 1971 in Chiswick, West London, as the modern world's first safe house for women and children escaping domestic violence.

The socialist feminist Brixton Black Women's Group was formed in 1973 to raise consciousness and organise around issues specifically affecting Black women. Several of the group's founding members, such as Beverley Bryan, Olive Morris and Liz Obi, had previously been active in the British Black Panthers and BWG was formed partly from frustrations that the Panthers were not taking women's issues seriously.

The Sex Discrimination Act 1975 (c. 65) was an act of the Parliament of the United Kingdom which protected people from discrimination on the grounds of sex or marital status. The Act concerned employment, training, education, harassment, the provision of goods and services, and the disposal of premises. The Gender Recognition Act 2004 and the Sex Discrimination Act 1975 (Amendment) Regulations 2008 amended parts of this act to apply to transsexual people. Other amendments were introduced by the Sex Discrimination Act 1986, the Employment Act 1989, the Equality Act 2006, and other legislation such as rulings by the European Court of Justice. The act did not apply in Northern Ireland, however the Sex Discrimination Gender Reassignment Regulations (Northern Ireland) 1999 does. The act was repealed in full by the Equality Act 2010.

The Grunwick dispute at the Grunwick Film Processing Laboratories in London, was an industrial dispute involving trade union recognition that led to a two-year strike between 1976 and 1978. It was led by Mrs Jayaben Desai, and involved mostly female, immigrant, East African Asian strikers. It was the first dispute where the majority of strikers were from an ethnic minority and still received widespread support from the labour movement.

The United Kingdom signed the Convention on the Elimination of All Forms of Discrimination against Women in 1981 and ratified it in 1986.

Female genital mutilation was outlawed in the UK by the Prohibition of Female Circumcision Act 1985, which made it an offence to perform FGM on children or adults. The act excludes those deemed medically necessary however, and so surgery on intersexed children continues despite growing controversy.

When Margaret Thatcher (who had been the first female prime minister of the United Kingdom from 1979 to 1990) died the then Leader of the Opposition, Ed Miliband paid tribute to her as "the first woman Prime Minister". However Thatcher received scant credit from feminists for breaking the ultimate glass ceiling, because she herself avoided feminism, and expressed an intensely masculine style.

R v R [1991] UKHL 12 (Note: The first R is short for Regina, denoting a criminal case brought in the name of the Crown; the second R is an anonymised reference to the defendant; [1991] UKHL 12 is a case citation.) is a court judgment delivered in 1991, in which the House of Lords determined that under English criminal law it is possible for a husband to rape his wife.

== Education ==
In a 2015 evaluation from Lord David Willetts stated that in 2013, the percentage of undergraduate students in the UK were 54 percent female and 46 percent male. Whereas in the 1960s only 25 percent of full-time students in the United Kingdom were female. The increase of women going to university and contributing in the educational system can be linked to the women's suffrage movements that aimed to encourage women to enroll in higher education.

== 21st century ==
The Sex Discrimination (Election Candidates) Act 2002 (c.2) is an act of Parliament of the United Kingdom. The purpose of the act was to exempt the selection of candidates in parliamentary elections from the provisions in the Sex Discrimination Act 1975 and the Sex Discrimination (Northern Ireland) Order 1976 that outlaw sexual discrimination. The purposes of the act allow political parties to select candidates based on gender in an effort to increase representation of women in British politics.

The act applies to elections to:

- the House of Commons;
- the Scottish Parliament;
- the National Assembly for Wales;
- the Northern Ireland Assembly;
- Local Government Elections (including the London Assembly); and
- the European Parliament.

The act does not apply to selection of candidates for the Mayor of London elections. Only political parties registered under part 2 of the Political Parties, Elections and Referendums Act 2000 are covered by the act.

The act was originally scheduled to run until the end of 2015. On 6 March 2008, Minister for Women Harriet Harman announced that the exemption would be extended until 2030 under the Equality Act 2010.

The Female Genital Mutilation Act 2003 and the Prohibition of Female Genital Mutilation (Scotland) Act 2005 made it an offence to arrange FGM outside the country for British citizens or permanent residents, whether or not it is lawful in the country to which the girl is taken. The first prosecutions took place in 2015 against a doctor for performing FGM and another man for aiding and abetting; both were found not guilty.

The Equality Act 2006 (c. 3) is an act of the Parliament of the United Kingdom, a precursor to the Equality Act 2010, which combines all of the equality enactments within Great Britain and provides comparable protections across all equality strands. Those explicitly mentioned by the Equality Act 2006 include gender; disability; age; proposed, commenced or completed gender reassignment; race; religion or belief and sexual orientation. Among other things, it created a public duty to promote equality on the ground of gender (The Equality Act 2006, section 84, inserting section 76A of the Sex Discrimination Act 1975, now found in section 1 of the Equality Act 2010.)

From 2007 until 2015, Harriet Harman was the Deputy Leader of the Labour Party. Traditionally, being Deputy Leader has ensured the cabinet role of Deputy Prime Minister. However, Gordon Brown announced that he would not have a deputy prime minister, much to the consternation of feminists, particularly with suggestions that privately Brown considered Jack Straw to be de facto deputy prime minister and thus bypassing Harman. With Harman's cabinet post of Leader of the House of Commons, Brown allowed her to chair Prime Minister's Questions when he was out of the country. Harman also held the post Minister for Women and Equality.

The Equality Act 2010 is an act of Parliament of the United Kingdom; the primary purpose of the act is to codify the complicated and numerous array of Acts and Regulations, which formed the basis of anti-discrimination law in Great Britain. This was, primarily, the Equal Pay Act 1970, the Sex Discrimination Act 1975, the Race Relations Act 1976, the Disability Discrimination Act 1995 and three major statutory instruments protecting against discrimination in employment on grounds of religion or belief, sexual orientation and age. It requires equal treatment in access to employment as well as private and public services, regardless of the protected characteristics of sex, age, disability, gender reassignment, marriage and civil partnership, race, religion or belief, and sexual orientation. In the case of gender, there are special protections for pregnant women. The act does not guarantee transsexuals' access to gender-specific services where restrictions are "a proportionate means of achieving a legitimate aim". Under s.217, with limited exceptions the act does not apply to Northern Ireland.

In 2013, the first oral history archive of the United Kingdom women's liberation movement (titled Sisterhood and After) was launched by the British Library.

Sisters Uncut was founded in 2014 to take direct action in response to cuts to domestic violence services by the UK government, which has included demonstrating against cuts at 7 October London premiere of the 2015 film Suffragette. Sisters Uncut organises intersectionally and see the struggle against racism and borders as intimately connected to the struggle against violence towards women.

In 2016, a British receptionist was dismissed for not wearing high heels and she then started a petition which attracted sufficient support to be considered by the UK Parliament. Outsourcing firm Portico stated that Nicola Thorp "had signed the appearance guidelines" but after Thorp launched her online petition—"Make it illegal for a company to require women to wear high heels at work"—the firm changed their policy. The new guideline states that all female employees "can wear plain flat shoes or plain court shoes as they prefer." The petition gained widespread support from public figures such as Scotland's First Minister Nicola Sturgeon and MPs Caroline Dinenage, Margot James and Tulip Siddiq. Two parliamentary committees in January 2017 decided that Portico had broken the law; the company had already changed its terms of employment. The petition gained over 130,000 signatures, sufficient for a debate in the British parliament. This took place on 6 March 2017, when MPs decided the UK government should change the law to prevent the demand being made by employers. However, this was rejected by the government in April 2017 as they stated that existing legislation was "adequate".

== Timeline ==
=== 1400s ===
- 1487: A statute, the Abduction of Women Act 1487 (3 Hen. 7. c. 2), entitled 'An Acte agaynst taking awaye of Women agaynst theire Wills' made abduction and forced marriage (or rape) of property-owning women or heiresses for the purposes of financial gain a felony in England. Those who aided and abetted the abduction or imprisonment were also guilty of a felony in England.

=== 1700s ===
- 1792: Mary Wollstonecraft published A Vindication of the Rights of Woman.

=== 1800–1850 ===
- 1803: The Malicious Shooting or Stabbing Act 1803 made abortion after quickening a capital crime, and provided lesser penalties for the felony of abortion before quickening.
- 1818: Jeremy Bentham advocated female suffrage in his book A Plan for Parliamentary Reform.
- 1832: The Representation of the People Act 1832 confirmed the exclusion of women from the electorate.
- 1835: Property owning women and widows had been allowed to vote in some local elections, but that ended in 1835.
- 1839: The Custody of Infants Act 1839 gave women, for the first time, a right to their children and gave some discretion to the judge in child custody cases. The act permitted a mother to petition the courts for custody of her children up to the age of seven, and for access in respect of older children, maintaining the responsibility for financial support to the father.
- 1844: The regulation of working hours in factories was extended to women by the Factory Act 1844.
- 1847: The Factory Act 1847 restricted the working hours of women and young persons (13–18) in textile mills to 10 hours per day. The practicalities of running a textile mill were such that the act should have effectively set the same limit on the working hours of adult male mill-workers, but defective drafting meant that the subsequent Factory Act 1850 imposing tighter restrictions on the hours within which women and young persons could work was needed to bring this about.

=== 1850–1880 ===
- 1842: The Mines and Collieries Act 1842 forbade women and girls of any age to work underground and introduced a minimum age of ten for boys employed in underground work. However, the employment of women did not end abruptly in 1842; with the connivance of some employers, women dressed as men continued to work underground for several years. Penalties for employing women were small and inspectors were few and some women were so desperate for work they willingly worked illegally for less pay.
- 1851: The Sheffield Female Political Association was founded and submitted an unsuccessful petition calling for women's suffrage to the House of Lords.
- 1851: Harriet Taylor Mill published the pro-women's-suffrage The Enfranchisement of Women.
- 1857: The Matrimonial Causes Act 1857 allowed for easier divorce through a Divorce Court based in London. Divorce remained too expensive for the working class.
- 1864–1886: The Contagious Diseases Acts, also known as the CD Acts, were originally passed by the Parliament of the United Kingdom in 1864, with alterations and editions made in 1866 and 1869. In 1862, a committee was established to inquire into venereal disease (i.e. sexually transmitted infections) in the armed forces. On its recommendation the first Contagious Diseases Act was passed. The legislation allowed police officers to arrest women suspected of being prostitutes in certain ports and army towns. The women were then subjected to compulsory checks for venereal disease. If a woman was declared to be infected, she would be confined in what was known as a lock hospital until she recovered or her sentence finished. The original act only applied to a few selected naval ports and army towns, but by 1869 the acts had been extended to cover eighteen "subjected districts". In 1886, the acts were repealed.
- 1865: John Stuart Mill elected as an MP showing direct support for women's suffrage.
- 1866: On 7 June 1866 a petition from 1,499 women asking for women's suffrage was presented to Parliament, but it did not succeed.
- 1867: The Representation of the People Act 1867 extended male franchise to 2.5 million; no mention of women.
- 1869: In June 1869, Lydia Becker and fellow campaigners were successful in securing the vote for women in municipal elections.
- 1870: The Married Women's Property Act 1870 allowed married women to be the legal owners of the money they earned and to inherit property.
- 1873: The Custody of Infants Act 1873, enacted by the Parliament of the United Kingdom due to additional pressure from women, extended the maternal right to petition for custody to children under sixteen
- 1877: Annie Besant was tried in 1877 for publishing Charles Knowlton's Fruits of Philosophy, a work on family planning, under the Obscene Publications Act 1857. Knowlton had previously been convicted in the United States. She and her colleague Charles Bradlaugh were convicted but acquitted on appeal, the subsequent publicity resulting in a decline in the birth rate.
- 1878: Magistrates' courts were given the authority to grant separation and maintenance orders to wives of abusive husbands; much cheaper than divorce.

=== 1880–1900 ===
- 1882: The Married Women's Property Act 1882 (45 & 46 Vict. c. 75) significantly altered English law regarding the property rights of married women, which besides other matters allowed married women to own and control property in their own right. The act applied in England and Wales, and Ireland, but did not extend to Scotland.
- 1883: Conservative Primrose League formed. "The Primrose League was the first political organisation to give women the same status and responsibilities as men" according to Alistair Cooke.
- 1884: The Representation of the People Act 1884, the 'Third Reform Act', doubled the male electorate to 5 million.
- 1884: The Married Women's Property Act 1884 significantly altered English law regarding the property rights granted to married women, allowing them to own and control their own property, whether acquired before or after marriage, and sue and be sued in their own name.
- 1886: The Contagious Disease Acts were repealed.
- 1886: The Guardianship of Infants Act 1886 made it easier for mothers to become guardians of the children after their father's death.
- 1889: Women's Franchise League established.
- 1893: The Married Women's Property Act 1893 completed the Married Women's Property Act 1882 by granting married women the same property rights as unmarried women.
- 1894: The Local Government Act 1894 allowed women who owned property to vote in local elections, become Poor Law guardians, and serve on school boards
- 1894: The publication of C. C. Stopes's British Freewomen happened this year; it was staple reading for the suffrage movement for decades.
- 1897: The National Union of Women's Suffrage Societies NUWSS was formed (led by Millicent Fawcett).

=== 1900–WW1 ===
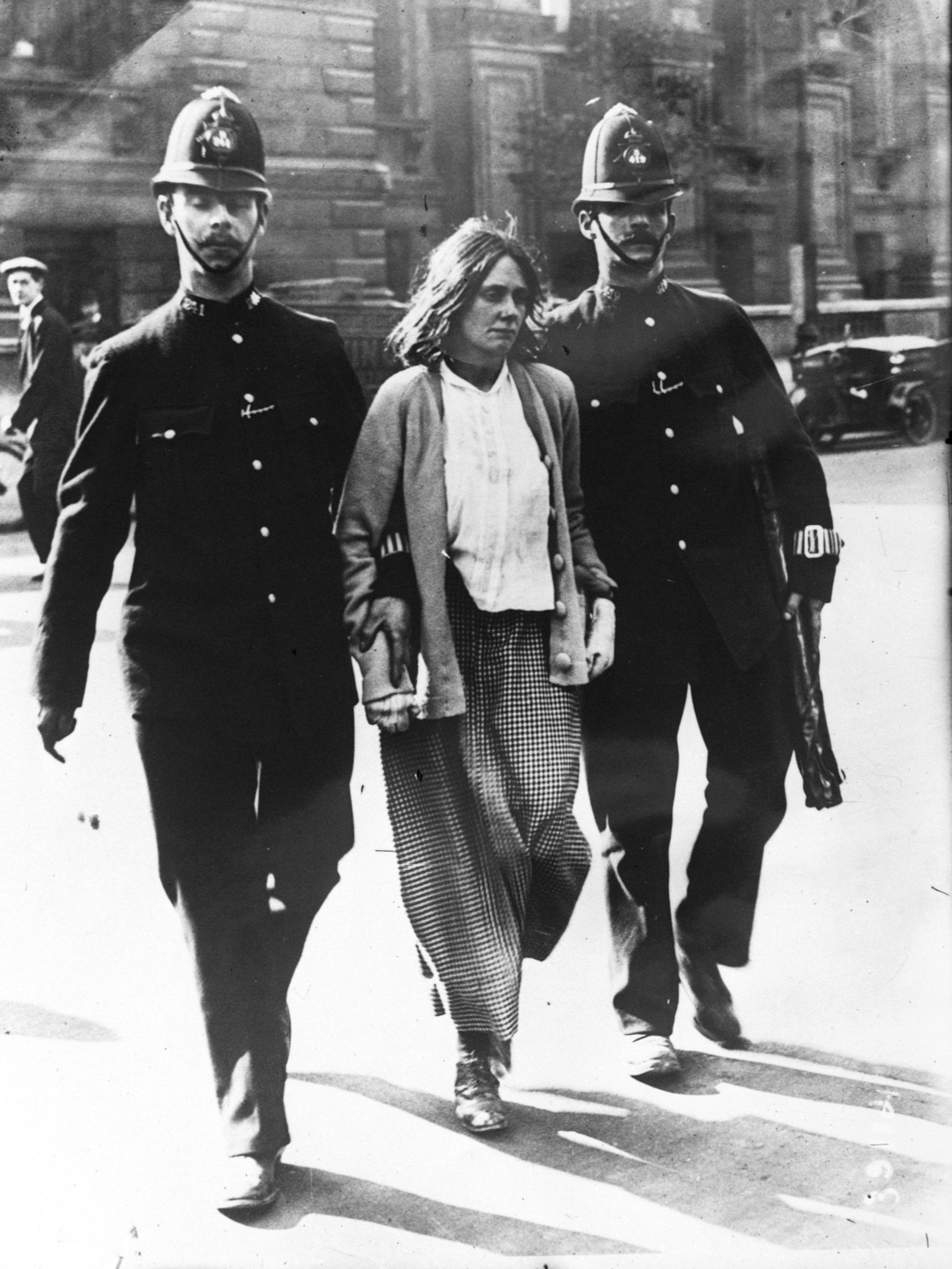
A suffragette arrested in the street by two police officers in London in 1914

- 1903: Women's Social and Political Union WSPU was formed (under tight control of Emmeline Pankhurst and her daughters)
- 1904: WPSU Militancy begins.
- 1905, 1908, 1913: Three phases of WSPU militancy (Civil Disobedience; Destruction of Public Property; Arson/Bombings).
- 1906: The Daily Mail first coined the term "suffragettes" as a form of ridicule, but the term was quickly embraced in Britain by women who used militant tactics in the cause of women's suffrage.
- February 1907: NUWSS "Mud March" – largest open air demonstration ever held (at that point) – over 3000 women took part. In this year, women were admitted to the register to vote in and stand for election to principal local authorities.
- 1907: The Matrimonial Causes Act 1907 consolidated previous legislation relating to maintenance payments to separated and divorced women. It was designed in response to one cause of poverty amongst mothers and their children, marriage break-up. Support for the "endowment of motherhood" was also increased.
- 1907: The Artists' Suffrage League founded.
- 1907: The Women's Freedom League founded.
- 1909: The Women's Tax Resistance League founded.
- September 1909: Force feeding introduced to WSPU hunger strikers in English prisons
- February 1910: Cross-Party Conciliation Committee (54 MPs). Conciliation Bill (that would enfranchise women) passed its second reading by a majority of 109 but Prime Minister Asquith refused to give it more parliamentary time
- November 1910: Asquith changes bill to enfranchise more men instead of women
- October 1912: George Lansbury, Labour MP, resigned his seat in support of women's suffrage
- February 1913: David Lloyd George's house burned down by WSPU (despite his support for women's suffrage).
- April 1913: The Prisoners (Temporary Discharge for Ill-Health) Act 1913 (the 'Cat and Mouse Act') passed, allowing hunger-striking prisoners to be released when their health was threatened and then re-arrested when they had recovered.
- 4 June 1913: Emily Davison of WSPU jumped in front of, and was subsequently trampled and killed by, the King's Horse at The Derby.
- 1913: The Great Pilgrimage of 1913 was a march in Britain by suffragists campaigning non-violently for women's suffrage. Women marched to London from all around England and Wales and 50,000 attended a rally in Hyde Park.
- 13 March 1914: Mary Richardson of WSPU slashed the Rokeby Venus painted by Diego Velázquez in the National Gallery with an axe, protesting that she was maiming a beautiful woman just as the government was maiming Emmeline Pankhurst with force feeding.
- 4 August 1914: First World War declared in Britain. WSPU activity immediately ceased. NUWSS activity continued peacefully – the Birmingham branch of the organisation continued to lobby Parliament and write letters to MPs.

=== 1918–WW2 ===
- 1918: The Representation of the People Act 1918 enfranchised men aged over 21, whether or not they owned property, and women aged over 30 who resided in the constituency whilst occupying land or premises with a rateable value above £5, or whose husbands did. At the same time, it extended the local government franchise to include women aged over 30 on the same terms as men.
- November 1918: the Parliament (Qualification of Women) Act 1918 was passed, allowing women over 21 to be elected into Parliament.
- December 1919: The Sex Disqualification (Removal) Act 1919 received royal assent on 23 December 1919. The basic purpose of the act was, as stated in its long title, "... to amend the Law with respect to disqualification on account of sex", which it achieved in four short sections and one schedule. Its broad aim was achieved by section 1, which stated that:
  A person shall not be disqualified by sex or marriage from the exercise of any public function, or from being appointed to or holding any civil or judicial office or post, or from entering or assuming or carrying on any civil profession or vocation, or for admission to any incorporated society (whether incorporated by Royal Charter or otherwise), [and a person shall not be exempted by sex or marriage from the liability to serve as a juror]…
  The Crown was given the power to regulate the admission of women to the civil service by Orders in Council, and judges were permitted to control the gender composition of juries. By section 2, women were to be admitted as solicitors after serving three years only if they possessed a university degree which would have qualified them if male, or if they had fulfilled all the requirements of a degree at a university which did not, at the time, admit women to degrees. By section 3, no statute or charter of a university was to preclude university authorities from regulating the admission of women to membership or degrees. By section 4, any orders in council, royal charters, or statutory provisions which were inconsistent with this act were to cease to have effect.
- 1923: The Matrimonial Causes Act 1923 was enacted, treating male and female adultery the same.
- 1925: The Guardianship of Infants Act 1925 improved women's legal rights to their children.
- 1920: The Employment of Women, Young Persons, and Children Act 1920.
- 1928: Women received the vote on the same terms as men (over the age of 21), as a result of the Representation of the People Act 1928.
- 1929: The Infant Life (Preservation) Act 1929 was enacted; it is an act of the Parliament of the United Kingdom. It created the offence of child destruction. It also amended the law so that an abortion carried out in good faith, for the sole purpose of preserving the life of the mother, would not be an offence.
- 1931: A one-week strike of 10,000 non-unionised factory worker women, led by communist activist Jessie Eden, caused an explosion of English women joining trade unions.
- 1932–1944: The BBC had a marriage bar between 1932 and 1944, although it was a partial ban and was not fully enforced due to the BBC's ambivalent views on the policy.
- 1937: The Matrimonial Causes Act 1937 extended the grounds for divorce, which then only included adultery, to include unlawful desertion for two years or more, cruelty, and incurable insanity.
- 1938: Dr. Aleck Bourne aborted the pregnancy of a young girl who had been raped by soldiers. Bourne was acquitted after turning himself in to authorities.
- 1944: In the UK, the marriage bar was removed for all teachers in 1944.
- 1946: The marriage bar was abolished in 1946 for the Home Civil Service; until then women were required to resign when they married.

=== 1945–1970 ===
- 1949: Lloyds Bank had a marriage bar that meant that female employees were classified as supplementary staff, rather than permanent. The bank abolished its marriage bar in 1949.
- 1952: Equal pay for female teachers was required by law.
- 1954: Equal pay for women in the civil service was required by law.
- 1958: The Life Peerages Act 1958 allowed for the creation of female peers entitled to sit in the House of Lords. The first such women peers took their seats on 21 October 1958.
- 1961: The birth control pill was introduced in the UK on the National Health Service in 1961 for married women only.
- 1963: The Peerage Act 1963 granted suo jure hereditary women peers (other than those in the Peerage of Ireland) the right to sit in the House of Lords.
- 1966: The Jockey Club refused to grant training licences to women trainers until Florence Nagle, supported by the Fawcett Society, sought legal redress. Initially she was unsuccessful until her fight finally reached the Court of Appeal in 1966.
- 1967: The birth control pill was made available for all women with the National Health Service from 1967.
- 1967: The Abortion Act 1967 legalised abortions by registered practitioners, and regulating the tax-paid provision of such medical practices through the National Health Service. The act made abortion legal in all of Great Britain (but not Northern Ireland) up to 28 weeks' gestation. The law was amended by the Human Fertilisation and Embryology Act 1990 so that abortion was no longer legal after 24 weeks, except in cases where it was necessary to save the life of the woman, there was evidence of extreme fetal abnormality, or there was a grave risk of physical or mental injury to the woman. Furthermore, all abortion remains officially restricted to cases of maternal life, mental health, health, rape, fetal defects, and/or socioeconomic factors.
- 1967: In the common law of crime in England and Wales, a common scold was a type of public nuisance—a troublesome and angry woman who broke the public peace by habitually arguing and quarrelling with her neighbours. The offence was punishable by ducking: being placed in a chair and submerged in a river or pond. Although rarely prosecuted it remained on the statute books in England and Wales until 1967.
- 1968: The Ford sewing machinists strike of 1968, led by Rose Boland, Eileen Pullen, Vera Sime, Gwen Davis, and Sheila Douglass, began because women sewing machinists, as part of a regrading exercise, were informed that their jobs were graded in Category B (less skilled production jobs), instead of Category C (more skilled production jobs), and that they would be paid 15% less than the full B rate received by men. At the time it was common practice for companies to pay women less than men, irrespective of the skills involved. Following the intervention of Barbara Castle, the Secretary of State for Employment and Productivity in Harold Wilson's government, the strike ended three weeks after it began, as a result of a deal that immediately increased their rate of pay to 8% below that of men, rising to the full category B rate the following year. A court of inquiry (under the Industrial Courts Act 1919) was also set up to consider their regrading, although this failed to find in their favour. The women were only regraded into Category C following a further six-week strike in 1984 (source BBC documentary broadcast 9 March 2013). The 1968 strike was a trigger cause of the passing of the Equal Pay Act 1970.
- 1969: Inspired by the Ford sewing machinists strike of 1968, women trades unionists founded the National Joint Action Campaign Committee for Women's Equal Rights (NJACCWER), which held an equal pay demonstration attended by 1,000 people in Trafalgar Square on 18 May 1969.
- 1970: During Miss World 1970, feminist protesters threw flour bombs during the live event at London's Royal Albert Hall, momentarily alarming the host, Bob Hope.
- 1970: The National Women's Liberation Conference (or National Women's Liberation Movement Conference) was a United Kingdom initiative organised to bring together activists in the Women's Liberation Movement with an aim to developing a shared political outlook. Ten UK conferences took place between 1970 and 1978, with the first taking place in 1970.
- 1970: The Equal Pay Act 1970 prohibits any less favourable treatment between women and men in terms of pay and conditions of employment. The act has now been mostly superseded by part 5, chapter 3, of the Equality Act 2010.

=== 1971–2000 ===
- 1971: Refuge was founded in 1971 in Chiswick, West London, as the modern world's first safe house for women and children escaping domestic violence.
- 1972: Spare Rib was a second-wave feminist magazine, founded in 1972 in the United Kingdom.
- 1972: Jockey Club rules began permitting women jockeys in 1972.
- 1973: The Matrimonial Causes Act 1973 (c. 18) is an act of Parliament of the United Kingdom governing divorce law and marriage in England and Wales.
- 1973: Women were first admitted to the London Stock Exchange.
- 1973: The first known use of the term domestic violence in a modern context, meaning violence in the home, was in an address to the Parliament of the United Kingdom by Jack Ashley in 1973. The term previously referred primarily to civil unrest, violence from within a country as opposed to violence perpetrated by a foreign power. (Note: Compare the 18 July 1877 request for help sent to President Rutherford B. Hayes by West Virginia governor Henry M. Mathews following the outbreak of strikes and riots: "Owing to unlawful combinations and domestic violence now existing at Martinsburg and other points along the line of the Baltimore & Ohio Railroad, it is impossible with any force at my command to execute the laws of the State.")
- 1973: The marriage bar was abolished in 1973 for the Foreign Service; until then women were required to resign when they married.
- 1973: The Bixton Black Women's Group was founded in 1973 and organised as a Black socialist feminist organisation based in Brixton, South London.
- 1975: The British Geological Survey had a marriage bar until 1975.
- 1975: The Sex Discrimination Act 1975 (c. 65) was an act of the Parliament of the United Kingdom which protected people from discrimination on the grounds of sex or marital status. The act concerned employment, training, education, harassment, the provision of goods and services, and the disposal of premises. The Gender Recognition Act 2004 and the Sex Discrimination Act 1975 (Amendment) Regulations 2008 amended parts of this act to apply to transgender people. Other amendments were introduced by the Sex Discrimination Act 1986, the Employment Act 1989, and the Equality Act 2006. The act did not apply in Northern Ireland, however the Sex Discrimination Gender Reassignment Regulations (Northern Ireland) 1999 does. The act was repealed in full by the Equality Act 2010.
- 1976: The Sex Discrimination (Northern Ireland) Order 1976 against sex discrimination was enacted.
- 1977: Marches were held in 11 towns in England in response to the "Yorkshire Ripper" murders; the marches were organised by the Leeds Revolutionary Feminist Group.
- 1978: Sisterwrite, Britain's first feminist bookshop, opened in 1978; it was run as a collective.
- 1978: Organisation of Women of African and Asian Descent (OWAAD), founded in 1978, was a feminist umbrella collective organising under a political black identity.
- 1979: The Kennel Club began admitting women members in 1979 following legal action by Florence Nagle.
- 1979: Southall Black Sisters, founded in 1979, is an organisation working under the political blackness, mobilising support for the needs of Black women.
- 1980: Mutki was founded in 1980 as a magazine run by British Asian feminists.
- 1980: Sheba Feminist Press was a UK publishing co-operative formed in 1980 by a group of seven women involved in the women's liberation movement.
- 1981: The United Kingdom signed the Convention on the Elimination of All Forms of Discrimination against Women in 1981.
- 1982: This year Anna Coote and Tess Gill won a case against El Vino’s in the Court of Appeal; this ended El Vino’s ban on women standing at the bar. They had lost the case at Mayor's and City of London Court before this.
- 1985: Female genital mutilation was outlawed in the UK by the Prohibition of Female Circumcision Act 1985, which made it an offence to perform FGM on children or adults.
- 1986: The United Kingdom ratified the Convention on the Elimination of All Forms of Discrimination against Women in 1986.
- 1989: Feminists Against Censorship (FAC) is a large network of women founded in 1989 in the United Kingdom to present the feminist arguments against censorship, particularly of sexual materials, and to defend individual sexual expression.
- 1990: The Abortion Act 1967 was amended by the Human Fertilisation and Embryology Act 1990 so that abortion was no longer legal after 24 weeks, except in cases where it was necessary to save the life of the woman, there was evidence of extreme fetal abnormality, or there was a grave risk of physical or mental injury to the woman.
- 1991: R v R [1991] UKHL 12 (Note: The first R is short for Regina, denoting a criminal case brought in the name of the Crown; the second R is an anonymised reference to the defendant; [1991] UKHL 12 is a case citation.) is a court judgment delivered in 1991, in which the House of Lords determined that under English criminal law it is possible for a husband to rape his wife.
- 1991: The Magic Circle voted to admit women.
- 1998: The British Boxing Board of Control initially refused to grant Jane Couch a professional licence on the sole ground that she was a woman, and argued that PMS made women too unstable to box. Claiming sexual discrimination and supported by the Equal Opportunities Commission, Couch managed to have this decision overturned by a tribunal in March 1998.
- 1998: Marylebone Cricket Club voted to admit women.

=== 2001–2010 ===
- 2002: The Sex Discrimination (Election Candidates) Act 2002 (c. 2) exempts the selection of candidates in parliamentary elections from the provisions in the Sex Discrimination Act 1975 and the Sex Discrimination (Northern Ireland) Order 1976 that outlaw sexual discrimination. This allows political parties to select candidates based on gender in an effort to increase representation of women in British politics.

The act applies to elections to:
- the House of Commons;
- the Scottish Parliament;
- the National Assembly for Wales;
- the Northern Ireland Assembly;
- Local Government Elections (including the London Assembly); and
- the European Parliament.

The act does not apply to selection of candidates for the Mayor of London elections. Only political parties registered under part 2 of the Political Parties, Elections and Referendums Act 2000 are covered by the act.

The act was originally scheduled to run until the end of 2015. On 6 March 2008, Minister for Women Harriet Harman announced that the exemption would be extended until 2030 under the Equality Act 2010.

- 2003–2005: The Female Genital Mutilation Act 2003 and the Prohibition of Female Genital Mutilation (Scotland) Act 2005 made it an offence to arrange FGM outside the country for British citizens or permanent residents, whether or not it is lawful in the country to which the girl is taken.
- 2004: The Domestic Violence, Crime and Victims Act 2004 (c. 28) is concerned with criminal justice and concentrates upon legal protection and assistance to victims of crime, particularly domestic violence. It also expands the provision for trials without a jury, brings in new rules for trials for causing the death of a child or vulnerable adult, and permits bailiffs to use force to enter homes.
- 2005: In England and Wales, the term "spinster" was abolished in favour of "single" for the purpose of marriage registration.
- 2006: A Reclaim the Night march was organized in Ipswich as a response to the murders of five prostitutes there, with between 200 and 300 attendees.
- 2006: The Equality Act 2006 (c. 3) is a precursor to the Equality Act 2010, which combines all of the equality enactments within Great Britain and provides comparable protections across all equality strands. Those explicitly mentioned by the Equality Act 2006 include gender; disability; age; proposed, commenced or completed gender reassignment; race; religion or belief and sexual orientation. Among other things, it created a public duty to promote equality on the ground of gender.
- 2007: The Forced Marriage (Civil Protection) Act 2007 (applicable in England and Wales, and in Northern Ireland) enables the victims of forced marriage to apply for court orders for their protection.
- 2010: The Equality Act 2010 codifies the complicated and numerous array of previous acts and regulations, which formed the basis of anti-discrimination law in Great Britain. These were, primarily, the Equal Pay Act 1970, the Sex Discrimination Act 1975, the Race Relations Act 1976, the Disability Discrimination Act 1995 and three major statutory instruments protecting discrimination in employment on grounds of religion or belief (the Employment Equality (Religion or Belief) Regulations 2003), sexual orientation (the Employment Equality (Sexual Orientation) Regulations 2003) and age (the Employment Equality (Age) Regulations 2006). It requires equal treatment in access to employment as well as private and public services, regardless of the protected characteristics of sex, age, disability, gender reassignment, marriage and civil partnership, race, religion or belief, and sexual orientation. In the case of gender, there are special protections for pregnant women. The act does not guarantee transgender people's access to gender-specific services where restrictions are "a proportionate means of achieving a legitimate aim". Under section 217, with limited exceptions, the act does not apply to Northern Ireland.

=== 2011–2020 ===
- 2011: The Forced Marriage etc. (Protection and Jurisdiction) (Scotland) Act 2011 gives courts the power to issue protection orders.
- 2012–2014: In April 2012 after being sexually harassed on London public transport English journalist Laura Bates founded the Everyday Sexism Project, a website which documents everyday examples of sexism experienced by contributors from around the world. The site quickly became successful and a book compilation of submissions from the project was published in 2014.
- 2012–2015: No More Page 3 was a campaign to stop The Sun newspaper from including pictures of topless glamour models on its Page 3; it ended when the topless feature was discontinued. The campaign was started by Lucy-Anne Holmes in August 2012; it reached 215,000 signatures by January 2015. The campaign gained widespread support from MPs and organisations but was criticised by Alison Webster, the photographer for Page 3. In January 2015, it was reported that The Sun had ended Page 3, but the feature was revived for one issue published on 22 January. Following that, Page 3 has not been featured in The Sun again.
- 2013: The Succession to the Crown Act 2013 (c. 20) altered the laws of succession to the British throne in accordance with the 2011 Perth Agreement. The act replaced male-preference primogeniture with absolute primogeniture for those born in the line of succession after 28 October 2011, which meant the eldest child regardless of gender would precede her or his siblings. It was brought into force on 26 March 2015, at the same time as the other Commonwealth realms implemented the Perth Agreement in their own laws.
- 2013: The first oral history archive of the United Kingdom women's liberation movement (titled Sisterhood and After) was launched by the British Library.
- 2014: Sisters Uncut was founded in 2014 to take direct action in response to cuts to domestic violence services by the UK government, which has included demonstrating against cuts at 7 October London premiere of the 2015 film Suffragette. Sisters Uncut organises intersectionally and see the struggle against racism and borders as intimately connected to the struggle against violence towards women.
- 2014: The Anti-Social Behaviour, Crime and Policing Act 2014 makes forcing someone to marry (including abroad) a criminal offence. The law came into effect in June 2014 in England and Wales and in October 2014 in Scotland.
- 2015: The Women's Equality Party is established.
- 2015: In Northern Ireland, the Human Trafficking and Exploitation (Criminal Justice and Support for Victims) Act (Northern Ireland) 2015 criminalises forced marriage (section 16 - Offence of forced marriage).
- 2015: The Lords Spiritual (Women) Act 2015 stipulates that whenever a vacancy arose among the Lords Spiritual during the next ten years after the act came into force, the position had to be filled by a woman, if there was one who was eligible. It did not apply to the five sees of Canterbury, York, London, Durham or Winchester, which are always represented in the House of Lords. The act was passed shortly after the Bishops and Priests (Consecration and Ordination of Women) Measure 2014 authorised the Church of England to appoint women as bishops.
- 2016–2017: In 2016, a British receptionist was dismissed for not wearing high heels and she then started a petition which attracted sufficient support to be considered by the UK Parliament. Outsourcing firm Portico stated that Nicola Thorp "had signed the appearance guidelines" but after Thorp launched her online petition—"Make it illegal for a company to require women to wear high heels at work"—the firm changed their policy. The new guideline states that all female employees "can wear plain flat shoes or plain court shoes as they prefer." The petition gained widespread support from public figures such as Scotland's First Minister Nicola Sturgeon and MPs Caroline Dinenage, Margot James and Tulip Siddiq. Two parliamentary committees in January 2017 decided that Portico had broken the law; the company had already changed its terms of employment. The petition gained over 130,000 signatures, sufficient for a debate in Parliament. This took place on 6 March 2017, when MPs decided the UK government should change the law to prevent the demand being made by employers. However, this was rejected by the government in April 2017 as they stated that existing legislation was "adequate".
- 2020: Scotland became the first nation to pass a law (the Period Products (Free Provision) (Scotland) Act 2021) making period products, including tampons and pads, free and available to access in public buildings.

=== 2021–2030 ===
- 2021: Britain abolished the tampon tax, meaning there is now a zero rate of VAT applying to women's sanitary products.
- 2024: The Garrick Club voted to admit women.
- 2026: The Crime and Policing Act 2026 received royal assent on 29 April 2026. Part 16 of it decriminalises abortion in England and Wales by disapplying sections of the Offences Against the Person Act 1861 and Infant Life (Preservation) Act 1929 when applied to one's own pregnancy. Due to this, any woman, living or dead, who was convicted of or cautioned for, “an offence under the law related to abortion, including sections 58 and 59 of the Offences against the Person Act 1861, and the Infant Life (Preservation) Act 1929” was automatically pardoned in 2026. Also, that year any woman investigated or arrested for ending her own pregnancy had any such details removed from her criminal record.

== See also ==
- Feminists Against Censorship
- First-wave feminism
- History of feminism
- History of women in the United Kingdom
- Mary Wollstonecraft
- New Left
- New social movements
- Pro-life feminism
- Second-wave feminism
- Sex-positive feminism
- Sheba Feminist Press
- Post-war Britain
- Socialist Women's Network
- The left and feminism
- The Women's Liberation Movement in the United Kingdom
- The Women's Library (London)
- Third-wave feminism
- Timeline of women's rights (other than voting)
- Women in the Victorian era
- Women's suffrage in the United Kingdom
