= Custody of Infants Act =

Custody of Infants Act could refer to:

- Custody of Infants Act 1839
- Custody of Infants Act 1873
