= GT v KAO (Child abduction) =

Irish Supreme Court case

Gt v Kao [2007] IESC 55
- Coat of arms of Ireland
- Court: Supreme Court of Ireland
- Full case name: T v O [2007] IESC 55; Gt v Kao [2008] 3 IR 567
- Decided: 22 November 2007
- Transcript: https://www.bailii.org/ie/cases/IESC/2007/S55.html

Case history
- Appealed from: High Court
- Appealed to: Supreme Court

Court membership
- Judges sitting: Murray C.J, Denham J, Hardiman J, Geoghegan J, Finnegan J

Case opinions
- An unmarried father who has been actively involved in raising his children or child is eligible for legal custody rights. Although, there is still a difference between married fathers and unmarried fathers. Notably, the importance is placed on whether a father has taken up the same responsibilities he would have if he was married.
- Decision by: Murray C.J.

Keywords
- Family Law, Child Abduction

Gt v Kao [2007] IESC 55; [2008] 3 IR 567 is an Irish Supreme Court case which upheld the High Court's decision that, under article 3 of the Hague Convention on the Civil Aspects of Child Abduction, the appellant had acted unlawfully in taking her two children outside of Ireland without permission from the respondent (the children's biological father).

If the appellant and the respondent had been married, this case would have been straightforward, however, they were not. Before this decision, an unmarried father who had children outside of a marriage had no legal rights over the children unless he was named the children's guardian. The case is significant as it recognised the right of unmarried fathers to apply for guardianship, custody or access under the Guardianship of Infants Act 1964.

== Background ==
The appellant (mother) and respondent (father) were the natural parents of the twin boys and were together for just over three years when the mother took the children from Ireland to England for an extended period of time. She did this without the father's knowledge, consent, or approval.

The father was an Irish citizen while the mother was both an Irish and a British citizen. Their relationship began in 2003, they shortly decided to live together, raise children, and work as a family unit, with a view to get married in the future. At some point that year, the appellant found out she was pregnant, with twins. The twins were born on the 13th of October, 2004, on the Isle of Man. The children were both Irish and British citizens. The family moved to Ireland in July 2005. After that, the respondent and the appellant got engaged. The two of them lived together in Ireland until January 2, 2007. Before this, the relationship between the appellant and the respondent had ended. After they broke up, the appellant and the twins moved back to England to live with her parents.

== Holding of the Supreme Court ==
Following on from a finding of the High Court in favour of the father, the Appellant appealed to the Supreme Court on the contention that:

The retention of the twin boys outside of this jurisdiction was not a wrongful retention with regards to the meaning of article 2 of Council Regulation No. 2201/2203(EC) and article 3 of the Hague Convention on the Civil Aspects of Child Abduction. The crux of this case related to whether the unmarried father could seek joint custody of the children. The respondent had initiated cases in both England and Ireland. He applied to the District Court on 9 March 2007, seeking order stating he was a guardian of the children in accordance with the Guardianship of Infants Act 1964, as amended by the Status of Children Act 1987. He also sought directions regarding access to his children and for custody under section 11 of the 1964 Act.

The return date set for this District Court proceeding was 9 March 2007. The English proceedings were deferred until the High Court and now the Supreme Court decided whether the removal of the children in England violated article 3 of the Convention and/or article 2 of the Council Regulation. On 3 May 2007, the respondent filed a special summons in the High Court of England and Wales to return the children under article 15 of the Hague Convention. The lower court and Supreme Court were not furnished with the High Court of England and Wales order. As the lower court judge thought, these proceedings began when article 15 of the Hague Convention was used by the High Court of England and Wales. In summary, article 15 empowers a contracting State's legal authorities to obtain a decision or determination from the children's habitual residence if the removal is improper under article 3 of the Hague Convention. Before returning the children, this can be done. In this case, English courts judged the matter a constitutional question for the Irish courts and so outside their jurisdiction.

The appellant further considered whether article 3's unlawful detention declaration should be applied for article 15. The High Court ruled that the mother had violated the father's custody rights by removing the children to England. The appellant contested the High Court's decisions.

This appeal was ultimately dismissed by the Supreme Court and the High Court's decision that the applicant was upheld. In doing this, the Supreme Court also rejected the two grounds of this appeal, which were:

1. The trial judge made an error in concluding that the habitual residence of the Appellant was in Ireland.
2. The trial judge made an error in attributing custody rights as per the District Court's earlier decision, on the basis that the applications to that Court made by the Respondent were void due to the inactivity of the Respondent in pursuing those applications.

The respondent's counsel proved the appellant's habitual residency in Ireland on the first ground of appeal. They further claimed that the appellant did not dispute such facts or provide enough proof to do so. They believed the Supreme Court's rulings were legal. The Court noted the issue was not that the twins' article 3 habitual residence was in Ireland when they were taken. It was whether that "habitual residency" in Ireland continued up to March 9, the date of the illegal retention as established by the High Court . The appellant's lawyer stated that she had made up her mind to remain in England permanently before March 9 in response to the first point of appeal. This means that prior to the District Court's retention date, Ireland was not the habitual residence. She argued that by making a declaration under article 3 of the Hague Convention, that the High Court Judge erred. She said that the lack of an adjourned ruling rendered the District Court's custody rights under respondent petitions invalid.

The Supreme Court referenced the High Court's habitual residence ruling. The lower court stated that the argument is whether the mother and children were in Ireland before the Appellant relocated to England on 2 January 2007. The respondent's evidence states that the Appellant informed him of her decision to stay in England permanently on 13 April 2007. She did not offer or dispute alternate dates in her affidavit. She claims she moved to UK with the twins to break up with the respondent.

Counsel for the appellant also confirmed that she was only in England temporarily and gave her Irish home address. Her letter shows she wanted to meet with the respondent in Ireland, with a mediator present. In the lower court, the mother was cross-examined about quitting her work and cancelling her Irish children's allowance before departing. She disagreed, and the Court asked why she had not revealed this in her affidavit if it was true. The respondent felt she would return to Ireland since she kept in touch after leaving. The respondent realised she might never return to Ireland when she refused to make him a guardian of the children. Based on all the evidence, the Court decided that the mother's usual residence was in Ireland until April 2007. So, the children's usual residence was determined to be the Republic of Ireland. The appellant's counsel stated that other passages in her declaration suggested she planned to stay in England. The Supreme Court found it difficult to concur with the appellant when other strong evidence suggested otherwise. The court did not agree with her claim that mediation was a way for her to show that she was sure she wanted to stay in England and rule out reconciliation. Hence, the Court rejected the Appellant's claim that she had left Ireland. This Court agreed with the lower court that the Appellant's habitual residence was Ireland when she left with the twins.

The appellant's lawyer cited the case of Re H (Minors) (Abduction: Custody Rights), which stated that an applicant's devotion and resolve may be taken into account when determining whether rights have been vested in a court. It might be argued that a court does not have custody rights if an applicant fails to demonstrate his actual desire through passivity or indifference. Following that, the respondent started a special summons in which he asked for his children to be sent back to Ireland, even though the Supreme Court thought the District Court Judge could have given better instructions. This demonstrates that the respondent did start all the procedures with sincere intentions. As a result, the court determined that the second basis of appeal also lacked substance.

== Subsequent developments ==
This case is important in the history of Irish law because it set a precedent that an unmarried father who has been actively involved in raising his children is eligible for legal custody rights. There is still a difference between married fathers and fathers who are not married. However, the importance depends on whether a father has taken on the same responsibilities he would have if he were married.

This case has been widely referred to and cited in many cases. It was first applied in the case of DE v EB. This case too concerned the question of habitual residence and the wrongful retention of a minor from one jurisdiction to another.
