= J. McD v P.L and B.M =

Irish Supreme Court case

J. McD v P.L. and B.M.
- Coat of arms of Ireland
- Court: Supreme Court of Ireland
- Full case name: J. McD v P.L. and B.M.
- Citation: [2007] IESC 28; [2008] ILRM 81; [2008] 1 IR 417

Court membership
- Judges sitting: Denham J, Fennelly J, Finnegan J

Keywords
- Family Law

J. McD v P.L and B.M [2007] IESC 28, [2008] ILRM 81 is an Irish Supreme Court case the rights of a sperm donor to access a child born through his donation. The Appellant, who was the biological donor, questioned whether he could be a guardian of the infant despite never having had a romantic relationship with the first named respondent who was the mother. The case raised important questions around the Irish legal definition of "family." The case is also important because the Supreme Court over-turned a High Court ruling that had relied on Article 8 of the European Convention of Human Rights.

== Facts of the case ==
The respondents in this case were in a same-sex relationship. One became pregnant by way of artificial insemination by a sperm donor, a man who was known to the respondents. They signed an agreement before the child was born which stated that the child would know who his biological donor was and he would view him as a "favorite uncle". The agreement did not grant the donor guardianship but allowed him to see the child at times that were suitable for both parties.

After the child was born the respondents intended to move to Australia with the child for a year, from March 2007 till around May 2018, the Appellant brought an action to restrain them from doing so. The first named respondent was Australian and wanted the infant to meet her family living in Australia. The second named respondent had gotten a temporary job in Australia for the year and they also rented out their home.

In the High Court, the Appellant obtained an interim order and later an interlocutory order. The respondents appealed this decision to the Supreme Court.

== Holding of the Supreme Court ==
The Court recognized that the Appellant has a right to apply to the court as section 6 A of the Guardianship of Infants Act 1964 says:

"(i) Where the father and mother of an infant have not married each other, the Court may on the application of the father, by order appoint him to be guardian of the infant."

The Supreme Court ruled that under Irish law the lesbian couple was not a family. Furthermore, the Court stated that the High Court had made a mistake in ruling that they were not a "de facto family" for the purpose of the law. The court rejected the applicability of Article 8 of the European Convention of Human Rights.

Denham J balanced the convenience between the parties and aimed to take the course involving the "least risk of justice". It was specified that some cases have special factors and such a special factor in this case was the child. For the same reason, the High Court had taken a child centered approach in its findings, stating that to separate the infant from the biological father with whom he had a relationship would not be in the child's best interests. The Supreme Court agreed with this finding. Additionally, Denham J found that the applicant had a right under Section 6 of the Guardianship of Infants Act 1964. This enabled him to apply to the court on this matter and could allow him to become a guardian of the child as he is the biological father of the infant.

Fennelly J dissented in this case, stating that the appeal should be allowed. Fennelly described the case as "utterly unique and unprecedented." According to Fennelly J, the rights of the biological father in this instance are vastly different to the rights of an unmarried father who has had a committed relationship with the mother of the child. Importance was also attached to the prior agreement which had been made between the applicant and respondents. According to Fennelly J, this agreement showed no indication that the applicant would be the guardian of the child.

The High Court had rejected the father's right to access as well as guardianship. The Supreme Court ultimately allowed the Appellant access to the infant but rejected his arguments for guardianship. While keeping the interlocutory order in place, it said that no guardianship of the child would be appointed to the applicant "at this time."

== See also ==
- Interim order
- Irish Supreme Court
- High Court (Ireland)
- Interlocutory order
- Guardianship of Infants Act 1964
- Susan Denham
- Nial Fennelly
