= George P. Smith II =

American academic (born 1939)

- Born: September 1, 1939; Wabash, Indiana
- Education: B.S. Indiana University; J.D. Indiana University School of Law
- Occupation: Emeritus Professor of Law
- Employer: Catholic University of America

George Patrick Smith II (born September 1, 1939) is an American academic. Until 2016 he was a professor of law at the Columbus School of Law at the Catholic University of America. He is now an emeritus professor at Catholic University, a Resident Fellow at The Institute for Advanced Study at Indiana University, and an Affiliated Scholar at The Georgetown University School of Medicine's Center for Global Health, Science and Security in Washington, D.C.

== Education and career ==
Smith was born in Wabash, Indiana, where his father and uncle were both attorneys. He attended the St. Bernard School in Wabash and graduated from Wabash High School in 1957. He obtained an undergraduate degree in business, economics, and public policy from Indiana University Bloomington in 1961 and a Doctor of Jurisprudence degree in 1964. While in law school, he was a member of the Indiana Law Review. In 1975, he earned an LL.M. degree from Columbia Law.

Early in his career, Smith taught at the University of Michigan Law School, University at Buffalo Law School, and University of Arkansas (Fayetteville) School of Law. His record of government service and consultancies includes:

- Legal Advisor, Foreign Claims Commission
- Special Counsel on the Environment to Arkansas Governor Winthrop Rockefeller
- Special Counsel, Environmental Protection Agency
- US House of Representatives Committee on Science and Technology (1981–87)
- Task Force on Private Sector Initiatives for President Reagan (1982–83)
- The Heritage Foundation Assessment Study of the United Nations (1982–83)
- New South Wales Law Reform Commission (1982–88)
- International Bioethics Committee, UNESCO Declaration on the Protection of the Human Genome (1995–97)

== Scholarship ==
Smith has been recognized as an expert in the "legal and ethical issues raised by modern medicine" and a "prescient prophet of the New Biology." A bibliography of Smith's works in law, science, and medicine covering the years 1964–1989 is available in the Journal of Contemporary Health Law and Policy. On the twenty-fifth anniversary of his career in legal education in 1989, United States Congressman John T. Myers paid tribute to Smith's years of distinguished service to the legal profession.

Recent books by Smith include:

- Dignity as a Human Right?, Lexington Books (2018)
- Law and Bioethics: Intersections Along the Mortal Coil, Routledge (2012)
- Distributive Justice and the New Medicine, Elgar Press (2008)
- The Christian Religion and Biotechnology: A Search for Principled Decision Making, Springer Verlag (2005)
- Human Rights and Biomedicine, Kluwer International (2000)

== Honors ==
- Life member of the American Law Institute
- Arkansas Traveler Citation for work done to conserve natural resources and develop environmentally sensitive management policies, 1970
- Elected to membership in The Cosmos Club in Washington, D.C., 1974
- Indiana University's "Silver Medallion" as a Distinguished Service Alumnus, 1985
- Induction to the Most Venerable Order of the Hospital of St. John of Jerusalem for contributions to law and medical science, 1988
- LL. D. degree, honoris causa, from Indiana University, 1988
- Honored with naming of Distinguished Professorship-Chair at Indiana University Maurer School of Law in Bloomington, 1998
- Inducted into the Indiana University Maurer School of Law's Academy of Law Fellows in recognition of his contributions to the legal profession, 2007
- Sagamore of the Wabash Citation, 2015
- Wabash High School Hall of Distinction, 2015–16
