= Journal of Contemporary Health Law and Policy =

- Discipline: Health law
- Language: English
- Edited by: Brian J. Farnkoff

Publication details
- History: 1985-present
- Publisher: Columbus School of Law (United States)
- Frequency: Biannually

Standard abbreviations
- Bluebook: J. Contemp. Health L. & Pol'y
- ISO 4: J. Contemp. Health Law Policy

Indexing
- CODEN: JCLPEF
- ISSN: 0882-1046
- LCCN: 85644356
- OCLC no.: 11745921

Links
- Journal homepage; Online archive

The Journal of Contemporary Health Law and Policy is a law review run by students at the Columbus School of Law (The Catholic University of America, Washington, D.C.). It was established in 1985 by George P. Smith II and is published semi-annually. The journal covers health-related issues, including legal analysis of recent trends in modern health care, issues involving the relationship of the life sciences to the social sciences and humanities, bioethics, and ethical, economic, philosophical and social aspects of medical practice and the delivery of health care systems.

== Abstracting and indexing ==
The Journal of Contemporary Health Law and Policy is abstracted and indexed in Index of Legal Periodicals, LexisNexis, Westlaw, Current Index to Legal Periodicals, Current Law Index, BIOSIS, MEDLINE, and Current Contents/Health Services Administration.

== Symposia ==
The journal organizes an annual symposium at the Columbus School of Law on current issues in the health and legal fields.

== Notable contributors ==
- Richard Posner, "The Ethics and Economics of Enforcing Contracts of Surrogate Motherhood", Vol. V
- Michale Kirby, "The Human Genome Project – Promise and Problem", Volume XII
- Raymond O'Brien, "Pedophilia: The Legal Predicament of the Clergy", Vol. IV
- Edmund D. Pellegrino, "Balancing Science, Ethics, and Politics: Stem Cell Research, a Paradigm Case", Vol. XVIII
