= Fathers' rights movement in Australia =

Masculist movement in Australia

The fathers' rights movement in Australia focus on issues of erosion of the family unit, child custody, shared parenting, child access, child support, domestic violence against men, false allegations of domestic violence, child abuse, the reintroduction of fault into divorce proceedings, gender bias, the adversarial family court system and secrecy issues.

== History ==
The fathers' rights movement began in Australia in the 1970s with the founding of organizations such as the Lone Fathers Association. Other groups include Fathers4Equality, Dads Against Discrimination, Fathers Without Rights, The Men's Confraternity, and the Shared Parenting Council. the Men's Rights Agency and One in Three.

== Shared parenting and family law reform ==
One of the central aims of the Australian fathers' rights groups is to promote shared parenting in post separation child care arrangements. In legal terms this is referred to as a rebuttable presumption of equal shared parenting time. In 2005, Senator Steve Fielding of the political party Family First, tabled a dissenting report to the Family Law Amendment (Shared Parental Responsibility) Bill 2005, stipulating this legal proposal.

The best example of the influence of men's rights groups was the "Family Law Amendment (Shared Parental Responsibility) Act 2006, which made both parents responsible for decisions about their child through the concept of 'equal shared parental responsibility'. The Act requires courts to consider an order that the child spend equal amounts of time with each parent under certain circumstances, but the Act does not state that courts must order that the child spend equal amounts of time with each parent. While the peer support group Dads in Distress expressed both appreciation of the Act as a small step in the right direction and concern whether the changes would be taken seriously by Family Law Practitioners and Barry Williams, national president and founder of the Lone Fathers Association, stated, "I think these new laws are going to be the best in 30 years", The Men's Confraternity welcomed the changes but also expressed disappointment and stated that the Act does not "force the Court to view parents as equals."

In reality the laws have had little impact upon the implementation of shared parenting. Prior to the introduction of the shared parenting act in 2004:

- 23% of all children aged 0–17 years had a parent living elsewhere.
- 31% did not see that parent or did so less than once a year
- 50% did not have an overnight stay

Six years after the implementation of the act in 2012:

- 21% of all children aged 0–17 years had a parent living elsewhere.
- 26% did not see that parent or did so less than once a year
- 52% did not have an overnight stay

This is because in 90% of contested trials the court does not order shared parenting Part of this is because of the belief of many judges that if parties have to litigate for shared custody then they are unsuited to it.

In 2009 the Chief Justice of the Family Court Diana Bryant, publicly sided against the 2006 amendments, flagging proposed changes soon after adopted by the Attorney General, Robert McLelland.

Once the shared parenting laws were in place, there was a significant push by women's groups in association with other interested parties, suggesting that Australia's shared parenting laws put children at risk because it marginalised family violence. Specifically it was alleged that "the legislation had moved away from protecting the rights of women and children to acceding to men’s demand for increased time with their children." In 2009 the government commissioned a report into the shared parenting laws, justified as being a response to the murder of a four-year-old Melbourne girl Darcey Freeman, who was thrown to her death from the West Gate Bridge by her father. Her father Arthur Freeman had obtained shared custody with his daughter through the family court. The story of Arthur Freeman was well but falsely publicised as an example of the danger that separated fathers posed to their children. For example, seven months prior to Arthur Freeman's actions Gabriela Garcia jumped off the same bridge with her 22-month-old son Oliver strapped to her chest to prevent Oliver's father from having contact with his son. In addition the Australian Institute of Family Studies evaluation of the 2006 Family Law Reforms, involving analysis of 27,000 parents stated that "the 2006 changes have improved the way in which the system is identifying and responding to families where there are concerns about family violence, child abuse and dysfunctional behaviours. In particular, systematic attempts to screen such families in the family relationship services sector and in some parts of the legal sector appear to have improved identification of such issues."

Despite the overall positive impact of these changes, in November 2010 the Attorney General Robert McLelland submitted amendments to the 2006 reforms, condemned by men's rights groups as a back-door attempt to dismantle the shared parenting laws. These amendments included the removal of any penalties for the making of knowingly false allegations in the Family Court, the removal of the requirement of both parents to facilitate contact, and a broadening of the definition of child abuse to include non-abusive behaviour.

== Political parties ==
As part of the father's right movement, there have been several single issue political parties focusing on family law reform. In the 2004 Federal election, prior to the 2006 reforms, the Non-Custodial (Equal Parenting) Party obtained 0.1% of the senate first party preference. In 2013 the first party preference vote had dropped to 0.01%.

The Family Law Reform Party was registered on 9 September 1996 and de-registered on 4 August 1999.

Originally known as the Abolish Child Support and Family Court Party, the Abolish Child Support/Family Court Party was first registered by the Australian Electoral Commission on 25 July 1997. It was renamed as the Abolish Child Support/Family Court Party on 2 April 1998. The party was de-registered on 8 May 2001. The party was subsequently re-registered and renamed as the No GST Party, but again de-registered on 27 December 2006.

The Non-Custodial Parents Party (Equal Parenting) was formed in 1998. The party was originally registered as the Non-Custodial Parents Party by the Australian Electoral Commission on 12 January 1999 and temporarily de-registered on 27 December 2006. All minor political parties were de-registered on that date. The party was then re-registered as the Non-Custodial Parents Party (Equal Parenting) on 30 August 2007. The party is currently registered as a political party with the Australian Electoral Commission (AEC). The party's core policies centre on the issue of family law and child support reform. The party strive for legislative changes to enshrine a child's natural rights to a meaningful relationship with both parents, and legal and procedural changes to ensure that the child support system is fair, equitable and aimed at fulfilling its primarily goal, that being to support the children.

== See also ==
- International Men's Day – 19 November (Trinidad & Tobago, Jamaica, India, Australia)
- Fathers' rights movement by country
