= Fathers' rights movement in Italy =

The fathers' rights movement in Italy is dedicated to achieving equal parental rights and obligations and shared parenting of children after divorce or separation. It consists of a number of diverse organizations, ranging from social charities and self-help groups to civil disobedience activists. At the local level, organizations offer support to newly separated fathers, many of whom are highly distraught.

== Organizations ==
Some of the most important fathers' right organizations in Italy are:

- The Associazione Padri Separati d'Italia (Italian Association of Separated Fathers) was founded in 1991. In addition to fathers rights advocacy, it offers counseling to divorced and separated fathers. The organization has local chapters in Turin, Alessandria, Genoa, Milan, Cremona, Trento, Bolzano, Venice, Mestre, Treviso, Rovigo, Padua, Belluno, Udine, Pordenone, Parma, Modena, Bologna, Rimini, Ferrara, Florence, Massa, Carrara, Lucca, Ancona, Ascoli Piceno, Pesaro, Jesi, Perugia, Gubbio, Pescara, Rome, Salerno, Naples, Cilento/Vallo della Lucania, Bari, Brindisi, Lecce, Catanzaro, Cosenza, Catania, Messina, Palermo, Cagliari, Oristano, Sassari and Olbia/Tempio.
- PATERNITA.INFO (Paternity info) is a non-profit movement for the promotion of fatherhood and family. Through education, art, publishing and advocacy, it promotes and supports fatherhood, modern masculinity, children's rights, shared parenting, gender equality, couple relationships, and single parents after divorce.
- The Armata dei padri (Fathers' armada) is a protest and advocacy organization for equality between fathers and mothers after divorce. In 2007, they dressed as women and protested that only women have rights after a divorce, and delegates met with the Equal Opportunities Minister, Barbara Pollastrini, who pledged her support.

== See also ==
- Child custody
- Father
- Fathers' rights
- Fathers' rights movement by country
- Shared parenting
