= Tender years doctrine =

Historic legal principle in English family law

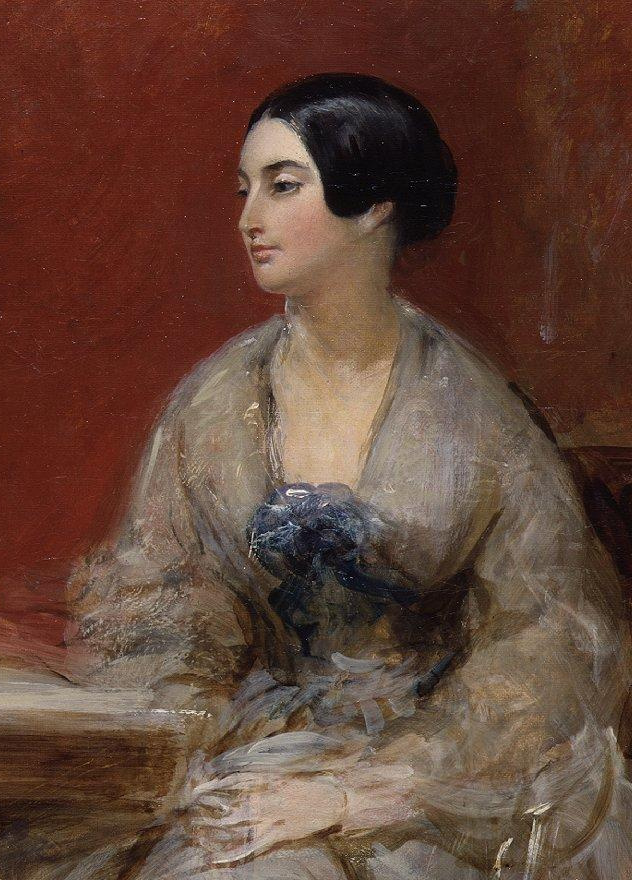
Caroline Norton, the person who initiated the tender years doctrine

The tender years doctrine is a legal principle in family law since the late 19th century. In common law, it presumes that during a child's "tender" years (generally regarded as the age of four and under), the mother should have custody of the child. The doctrine often arises in divorce proceedings.

== History ==
Historically, English family law gave custody of the children to the father after a divorce. Until the 19th century, women had few individual rights and obligations, most derived from their fathers or husbands.

In the early nineteenth century, Caroline Norton, a prominent social reformer, campaigned for the right of women to have custody of their children. Norton, who had undergone a divorce and been deprived of her children, worked with politicians. The British Parliament enacted legislation to protect mothers' rights. The Custody of Infants Act 1839 established a presumption of maternal custody for children under the age of seven years; the Act also gave some discretion to the judge in a child custody case, and maintained responsibility for financial support from their former husbands. With the Custody of Infants Act 1873, the Parliament extended the presumption of maternal custody until a child reached sixteen. The doctrine spread in many states of the world because of the British Empire. By the end of the 20th century, the doctrine was established in most of the United States and Europe.

== Application ==
=== In United States ===
The tender years doctrine was frequently used in the 20th century but is gradually being replaced by the "best interests of the child" doctrine of custody through changes in state statutes. Furthermore, several courts have held that the tender years doctrine violates the Equal Protection Clause of the Fourteenth Amendment to the U.S. Constitution. However, state courts still use the doctrine in many cases, which prompted family court reform similar to criminal justice reform.

Critics of the family court system, and in particular fathers' rights groups, contend that although the tender years doctrine has formally been replaced by the best interests of the child rule, the older doctrine is still, in practice, how child custody is primarily determined in family courts nationwide. Critics maintain that the father must prove the mother to be an unfit parent before he is awarded primary custody, while the mother need not prove the father unfit to win custody herself, contrary to the Equal Protection Clause.

=== In Europe ===
Most of the states in the EU have gradually abolished the tender years doctrine. In those states, the joint custody is the rule after divorce or the parents' separation. The Principles of the European Family Law regarding the parental responsibilities clarifies that the two parents are equal and their parental responsibilities should neither be affected by the dissolution or annulment of the marriage or other formal relationship nor by the legal or factual separation between the parents.

== See also ==
- Custody of Infants Act 1873
- Custody of Infants Act 1839
- Caroline Norton
- Suitable age and discretion

== Bibliography ==
- Blakesley, Christopher L. 1981. "Child Custody and Parental Authority in France, Louisiana and Other States of the United States: A Comparative Analysis" Boston College International and Comparative Law Review, Volume 4, Issue 2.
- Bookspan, Phyllis T. 1993. "From a Tender Years Presumption to a Primary Parent Presumption: Has Anything Really Changed? … Should It?", Brigham Young University Journal of Public Law 8 (January).
- Katz, Sanford N. 1992. "'That They May Thrive' Goal of Child Custody: Reflections on the Apparent Erosion of the Tender Years Presumption and the Emergence of the Primary Caretaker Presumption." Journal of Contemporary Health Law and Policy, Catholic University 8 (spring).
- McLain, Lynn. 1997. "Children Are Losing Maryland's 'Tender Years' War." University of Baltimore Law Review 27 (fall).
- Pica, Derek A. 1999. "The Tender Years Doctrine: Is It Still the Law?" Advocate (Idaho) 38 (January).
- Radke, Lynn E. 1993. "Michigan's New Hearsay Exception: The 'Reinstatement' of the Common Law Tender Years Rule." University of Detroit Mercy Law Review 70 (winter).
- Rinella, Lori. 1995. "Children of Tender Years and Contributory Negligence." UMKC Law Review 63 (spring).
