= Raymond O'Brien =

American Roman Catholic priest

Raymond O'Brien (born January 18, 1944) is a priest of the Roman Catholic Archdiocese of Washington and a professor of law at the Columbus School of Law in the Catholic University of America. O'Brien has published numerous books on domestic relations, and has also written on the legal consequences of the AIDS epidemic.

O'Brien received a B.A. from La Salle University in 1966 and a Juris Doctor from the University of Virginia School of Law in 1969. After serving as a captain in the United States Army from 1969 to 1971, O'Brien became an adjunct professor of law at the George Mason University School of Law. At the same time, he pursued a master's degree in Church Administration at the Catholic University of America, receiving the degree in 1975, and following it with a Doctor of Ministry from the same institution in 1985.

In 2013, O'Brien commented on the sexual abuse scandal in the Roman Catholic Archdiocese of Philadelphia, observing that concealment of abuse by reassigning problematic clergy was no longer considered a tenable practice in the church.
