= Anne Jane Thornton =

Irish cross-dresser (1817–1877)

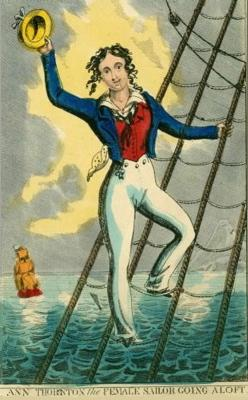
ANN THORNTON GOING ALOFT

Anne Jane Thornton (1817–1877), also spelt Ann Jane Thornton, was an adventurer from Donegal who in 1832 posed as a boy to go to sea, in pursuit of a lost lover who had gone to the United States. She continued her career as a seaman until her arrival in London in 1835, when she was interviewed by the Lord Mayor of London. She later wrote a book about her adventures.

== Early life ==
Born in Gloucestershire, in the west of England, in 1817, Thornton was the daughter of a prosperous shop-keeper. According to the Oxford Dictionary of National Biography, in 1823 her mother died, and her father moved to Donegal in Ireland where he opened a successful shop. The Lady magazine for 1835 adds a further detail: "...when six years old she accompanied her father to Ireland, where he afterwards possessed profitable stores and subsequently failed".

== Life ==
At the age of thirteen, Thornton met Captain Alexander Burke, an Englishman whose father lived in New York, and before she was fifteen the two had become strongly attached to each other. In 1832, Burke left Donegal to travel to New York, and Thornton made up her mind to go after him. Attended by a maid and a boy, she left Donegal, obtained a suit of cabin boy's clothes, and posing as a boy, made a safe passage to New York. On arrival, she went to Burke's father's house, where she said that she had worked under the captain's orders and wished to be engaged by him again. She learnt from Burke's father that the man she loved had died a few days before.

Without money, Thornton needed to find employment. By now, she had a swarthy complexion, which helped to make her look less like a young woman, and still posing as a boy she got a position at nine dollars a month as ship's cook and steward on board The Adelaide. After this, she had a berth in The Rover. She later served on the Belfast, "dressed in a red worsted Jacket and duck trousers". Between ships, she once walked seventy miles from Eastport, Maine, to St Andrew's, dressed as a sailor.

Eventually, Thornton took a position as a ship's cook on another ship, The Sarah, bound for London, giving her name as Jim Thornton from Donegal. As Jim, she proved a great asset to the ship, cooking and also helping out on deck when needed, as the ship was sailing with an under-strength crew.

It was on this vessel that Thornton was discovered as a woman:

One day as she was washing in her berth, with her jacket loose in the front, one of the crew caught an accidental view of her bosom.

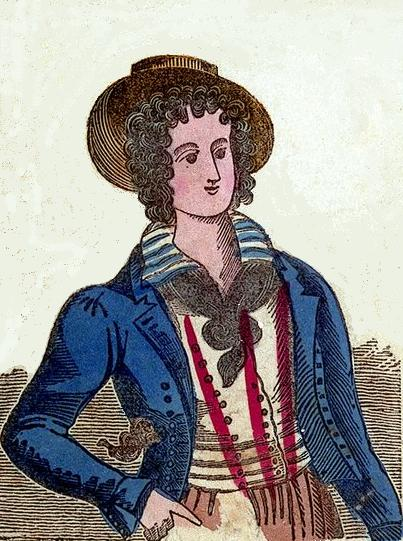
Anne Jane Thornton, engraving of 1835

The sailor who discovered Thornton threatened that unless she agreed to sexual intercourse with him, he would report her to the ship's master, Captain McIntyre. Thornton refused, and when she was revealed to the master he "turned her out to work amongst the men, by whom she upon all occasions was most grossly insulted".

McIntyre recorded his astonishment on learning that Thornton was a woman:

I could scarcely credit the mate when he told me of it. I can bear testimony to the extraordinary propriety of her conduct and I ask again whether I have not acted properly towards her.

The Sarah was bound at the time for London, where she docked in February 1835. Before this arrival, other crew members had suspicions about Thornton's identity, and McIntyre later told The Times that she had been abused by the other sailors and that she had worked hard aboard the ship. McIntyre reported that Thornton

...did the duty of a seaman without a murmur and had infinitely a better use of her hands than her tongue... She performed to admiration. She would run up the top gallant-sail in any sort of weather and we had a severe passage. Poor girl, she had a hard time of it, she suffered greatly from the wet but she bore it all excellently and was a capital seaman.

The story was reported in the London newspapers after a customs officer on the River Thames had intervened to stop a member of The Sarah's crew from mistreating a young sailor, finding to his amazement that the sailor was a young woman. The customs man then lodged Thornton at the Cooper's Arms Tavern in Lower Thames Street and reported the case to his superiors.

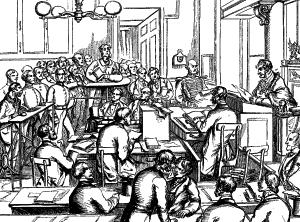
A hearing at the Mansion House, c. 1840

After the Lord Mayor of London had read the reports, he sent a police inspector to investigate and subsequently held an inquiry at the Mansion House, himself interviewing all parties concerned, including Thornton and McIntyre. The captain said he had had no suspicion when employing Thornton that she was female and insisted that he had every intention of paying her the money she had earned on the voyage. Called on by McIntyre to say whether he had ever been unkind to her, Thornton replied "No, you were always most considerate. But some of the men struck me cruelly when I could not work as hard as they were in the rough weather".

The Lord Mayor berated Thornton for running away from her father, while praising her seafaring conduct, and offered her money to help her to return home to her father in Ireland.

The people of London sympathised with Thornton, and she was offered £500 to appear on the stage, but she refused the offer, stating that she wanted only to go home to her father. However, when the Lord Mayor made inquiries in Donegal he found that Thornton's father had himself emigrated to America, although her sister still lived there and was glad to hear news of Anne Jane. The Lord Mayor booked Thornton a seat on the London to Liverpool coach, and she left for Ireland on 2 April 1835. On 13 April, a newspaper in Ballyshannon reported her arrival in Donegal.

A vast crowd collected to see her, but the sailor hurried to the house of her sister, in the back lane... We were fortunate enough to have seen the young woman. She is now quite tired of the sea she says she would not join a ship again for £500 a year as it is the most wretched life imaginable. She says she will never marry.

Thornton's story became even better known after she wrote an autobiographical book, The Interesting Life and Wonderful Adventures of that Extraordinary Woman Anne Jane Thornton, the Female Sailor.

King William IV granted Thornton a pension of £10 a year, while a Mr Andrew Murray gave her the use of a farm near Lough Eske, rent-free.

In February 1836, Thornton married, under unusual circumstances. One day a friend from Ballyshannon went to Donegal to visit her and found her being dragged to a clergyman by a group of men, who intended her to marry one of them. Her friend rescued her and they were married the next day. She gave birth to a son in November 1836.

Thornton lived until 1877.

== Ballad of The Female Sailor Bold ==
Thornton's story inspired the ballad The Female Sailor Bold, also called The Female Sailor. The following is the text of the ballad, as sold in the United States from c. 1835.

An edited version appears in The Oxford Book of English Traditional Verse (1983).

Good people give attention and listen to my song;
I will unfold a circumstance that does to love belong;
Concerning of a pretty maid who ventur'd we are told
Across the briny ocean as a female sailor bold.

Her name was Ann Jane Thornton, as you presently shall hear,
And also that she was born in fam'd Gloucestershire;
Her father now lives in Ireland, respected we are told,
And grieving for his daughter—this female sailor bold.

She was courted by a captain when not fifteen years of age,
And to be joined in holy wedlock this couple did engage,
But the captain was bound to America, as I will now unfold,
And she followed him o'er the ocean did this female sailor bold.

She dress'd herself with sailors clothes and was overcome with joy
When with a captain she did engage to serve as cabin boy,
And when New York in America this fair maid did behold
She determined to seek her true love did this female sailor bold.

Then to her true loves fathers she hastened with speed,
When the news that she did hear most dreadful indeed,
That her love had been dead some time they to her did unfold
Which very near broke the heart of this female sailor bold.

Some thousand miles she was from home from friends far away
Alone she traveled seventy miles thro' woods in North America
Bereft of all her kindred nor no parent to behold,
In anguish she cried my true love did this female sailor bold.

Then she went on board the Adelaide, to cross the troubled wave
And in storms of hail and gales of wind she did all dangers brave
She served as cook and steward in the Adelaide we are told
Then sailed on board the Rover did the female sailor bold.

From St Andrew's in America this fair maid did set sail,
In a vessel called the Sarah and brav'd many a stormy gale
She did her duty like a man did reef and steer we're told
By the captain she was respected well—the female sailor bold.

With pitch and tar her hands were hard, tho' once like velvet soft
She weighed the anchor, heav'd the lead and boldly went aloft
Just one and thirty months she braved the tempest we are told
And always did her duty did the female sailor bold.

'Twas in the month of February eighteen hundred thirty five,
She in the port of London in the Sarah did arrive;
Her sex was then discovered which the secret did unfold,
And the captain gaz'd in wonder on the female sailor bold.

At the Mansion-House she appear'd before the Lord Mayor,
And in the public papers then the reasons did appear,
Why she did leave her father and her native land she told,
To brave the stormy ocean, did this female sailor bold.

It was to seek her lover that sailed across the main,
Thro' love she did encownter storms tempest wind and rain.
It was love caused all her troubles and hardships we are told;
May she rest at home contented now the female sailor bold.
