= Custody of Infants Act 1839 =

Act of the Parliament of the United Kingdom

- Act of Parliament
- Parliament of the United Kingdom
- Long title: An Act to amend the Law relating to the Custody of Infants.
- Citation: 2 & 3 Vict. c. 54
- Territorial extent: United Kingdom

Dates
- Royal assent: 17 August 1839
- Commencement: 17 August 1839 (Note: Section 1.)
- Repealed: 24 April 1873
Other legislation
| Repealed by | Custody of Infants Act 1873 |

Status: Repealed

Text of statute as originally enacted

The Custody of Infants Act 1839 (2 & 3 Vict. c. 54) was an act of the Parliament of the United Kingdom.

The act was greatly influenced by the reformist opinions of Caroline Norton. Norton had a failed marriage with her husband. Her pamphlets arguing for the natural right of mothers to have custody of their children won much sympathy among parliamentarians. The need for the reform in the custody of children area had already been the subject of parliamentary actions before 1839. However, because of Norton's intense campaigning, Parliament passed the Custody of Infants Act 1839 and included there many of her reformist ideas.

This changed dramatically the way that custody of the children after divorce was granted. If previously in the majority of the cases the child custody was awarded to the father, the Custody of Infants Act 1839 permitted a mother to petition the courts for custody of her children up to the age of seven, and for access in respect of older children. This was the starting point of a new doctrine in the area of child custody, called Tender years doctrine.

== Subsequent developments ==
The whole act was repealed and replaced by section 3 of the Custody of Infants Act 1873 (36 & 37 Vict. c. 12), which came into force on 24 April 1873.
