= Fathers' rights movement by country =

Details for specified areas

The fathers' rights movement has simultaneously evolved in many countries, advocating for shared parenting after divorce or separation, and the right of children and fathers to have close and meaningful relationships. This article provides details about the fathers' rights movement in specific countries.

== Australia ==
Fathers' rights groups began in Australia in the 1970s with the founding of organizations such as the Lone Fathers Association. Other well-known groups include Equality for Fathers, Dads Against Discrimination, Fathers Without Rights, The Men's Confraternity and the Shared Parenting Council. As with other fathers' rights activists, Australian organizations focus on issues of erosion of the family unit, custody, access, child support, domestic violence (including false allegations, and violence against men), child abuse, maintenance, the reintroduction of fault into divorce proceedings, biased and adversarial court systems and secrecy issues. Groups have successfully garnered media, as well as influence on politicians and legal reform. On May 22, 2006, Australia passed the "Family Law Amendment (Shared Parental Responsibility) Act 2006" making both parents responsible for decisions about their child through the concept of 'equal shared parental responsibility'. The Act requires courts to consider an order that the child spend equal amounts of time with each parent under certain circumstances, but the Act does not state that courts must order that the child spend equal amounts of time with each parent. While Dad's in Distress expressed both appreciation of the Act as a small step in the right direction and concern whether the changes would be taken seriously by Family Law Practitioners and Barry Williams, national president and founder of the Lone Fathers Association, stated, "I think these new laws are going to be the best in 30 years", The Men's Confraternity welcomed the changes but also expressed disappointment and stated that the Act does not "force the Court to view parents as equals."

The Non-Custodial Parents Party (Equal Parenting) was formed in Australia in 1998. The party's web-site states that the core policies centre on the issue of family law and child support reform. The Non-Custodial Parents Party (Equal Parenting) is currently registered as a political party with the Australian Electoral Commission (AEC).

Fathers' rights groups in Australia have condemned the actions of a militant men's group that engaged in criminal activities, including stalking and harassment.

== Belgium ==
Since September 2006, the Belgian federal law on "co-parenté" came into effect. It introduced a presumption of dual location or shared residency which by law should be taken into serious consideration and thorough investigation with priority in each individual case by the Belgian family courts and judges on the request of either one of the divorcing parents separately. Immediate court-access can also be requested by one parent, when additional reinforcement orders are necessary.

== Canada ==
In an attempt to pass a law creating a rebuttable presumption for shared parenting, several fathers' rights groups launched an action in the Federal Court of Canada to overturn the child custody provisions of the existing federal Divorce Act claiming that the legal test used to decide which parent obtains custody is biased against fathers, thereby violating the discrimination based on sex provisions of the Canadian Charter of Rights and Freedoms, as well as the United Nations Convention on the Rights of the Child.

Canada has few father's rights organizations, most are political in nature to lobby long term for changes to the Divorce act. www.OttawaMensCentre.com provides resources for fathers including lawyer referrals to deal with classic cases of alienation and false allegations. Most vocal among them has been Canadian Association for Equality which advocates equal parenting and social rights for people regardless of gender.

The Canadian Equal Parenting Council, a coalition of 40 member organizations and worldwide affiliates stated that it is pleased with a proposed amendment to the Divorce Act to create a presumption for equal parenting.

The Equal Parenting Party, a minor provincial political party, existed in Ontario from 2014 to 2018. It ran two candidates in the 2014 Ontario general election and received 0.01% of the popular vote.

== Finland ==
There are at least two registered associations in Finland with a focus in fathers' rights: Association for Equality of Men (established 2009) and Fathers for Children Association (established 2012). The former works for equality of the genders in general from the viewpoint of men. The latter focuses on retaining the bonds between fathers and children after divorce. Fathers for Children disapproves parental alienation regardless of the sex of the parent who is trying to alienate a child from the other parent.

== France ==
Separation of the parents has no effect on the rules governing the awarding of parental authority. Parental authority continues to be exercised jointly except if in the interest of the child the exercise of this authority must be entrusted to only one of the parents.

There are 117 national and regional French organizations promoting parent equality after separation with respect to child custody : SOS Papa since 1990, SVP Papas, LPLM (Les Papas = Les Mamans), Egalité parentale, Osons l'égalité parentale pour nos enfants, and Collectif la Grue Jaune since Feb 2013.

The latest was created after 2 Fathers climbed on top of 2 yellow and grey cranes in February 2013 in Nantes and tries to gather mothers, fathers and grandparents.

Both are members of PEF Platform for European fathers (the first one via SOS Papa Nord Picardie)

== Germany ==
In Germany, one parent may apply to the family court for sole right of custody. The court will agree to such an application if they decide the removal of joint custody and transfer of custody to one parent is in the child's best interests.

Non-married Fathers; To obtain "Shared Custody" (and any real rights concerning children) is possible through marriage or by the mother signing a declaration of shared custody or since May 2013 by applying to the court. Sole custody (for the father) is of course not realistic under the current German family law. The German Supreme Court (Bundesverfassungericht) has decided on 21 July 2010 that the actual Family Law is against the German Constitution Law. For a very detailed explanation of the legal situation, see Wikipedia German web page;

Joint custody can be defeated when the parents do not agree. See Constitutional Court decision 1 BvR 738/01 from March 1, 2004, paragraph II. 1. a) The third sentence is translated into English as: "The joint exercise of parental responsibility presupposes a viable social relationship between the parents and requires a minimal level of agreement between them." If one parent refuses to cooperate, the court changes joint custody to sole custody. The law governing the choice of parent receiving sole custody is based on "best interests of the child" The non-cooperation of a parent is not a factor when determining "best interests of the child" and therefore which parent receives sole custody. A parent can refuse to cooperate in order to force a decision in favor of sole custody and then be eligible to win sole custody after refusing to cooperate with the other parent.

Mathieu Carriere, a well-known German actor, who after the mother and sole custodian of his 8-year-old daughter sued him for allowing several newspapers to publish pictures of Carriere with his daughter, decided to refuse to pay a 5,000 Euro fine associated with the lawsuit and instead announced publicly that he would be serving a 10-day prison sentence in support of the campaign for equal rights for both parents following divorce or separation.

There are many small to medium-sized organizations created to advocate for changing rights like Blauer-Weihnachtsmann.de, Väteraufbruch.

== Greece ==
1,000,000 divorced fathers are living in Greece. With the present Greek family civil law, there is almost no option for shared or joined parenting between parents in a case of divorce. In 98% of these cases, the Greek judges decide against the fathers and order that the mothers will have the exclusive child custody. The unic association SYGAPA with 35.000 members, hold many activities for equality between parents and for changing the Greek civil law. As of 2013Greek fathers are still expecting real equality from politicians. They have created the "European Social Movement" covering all European countries.

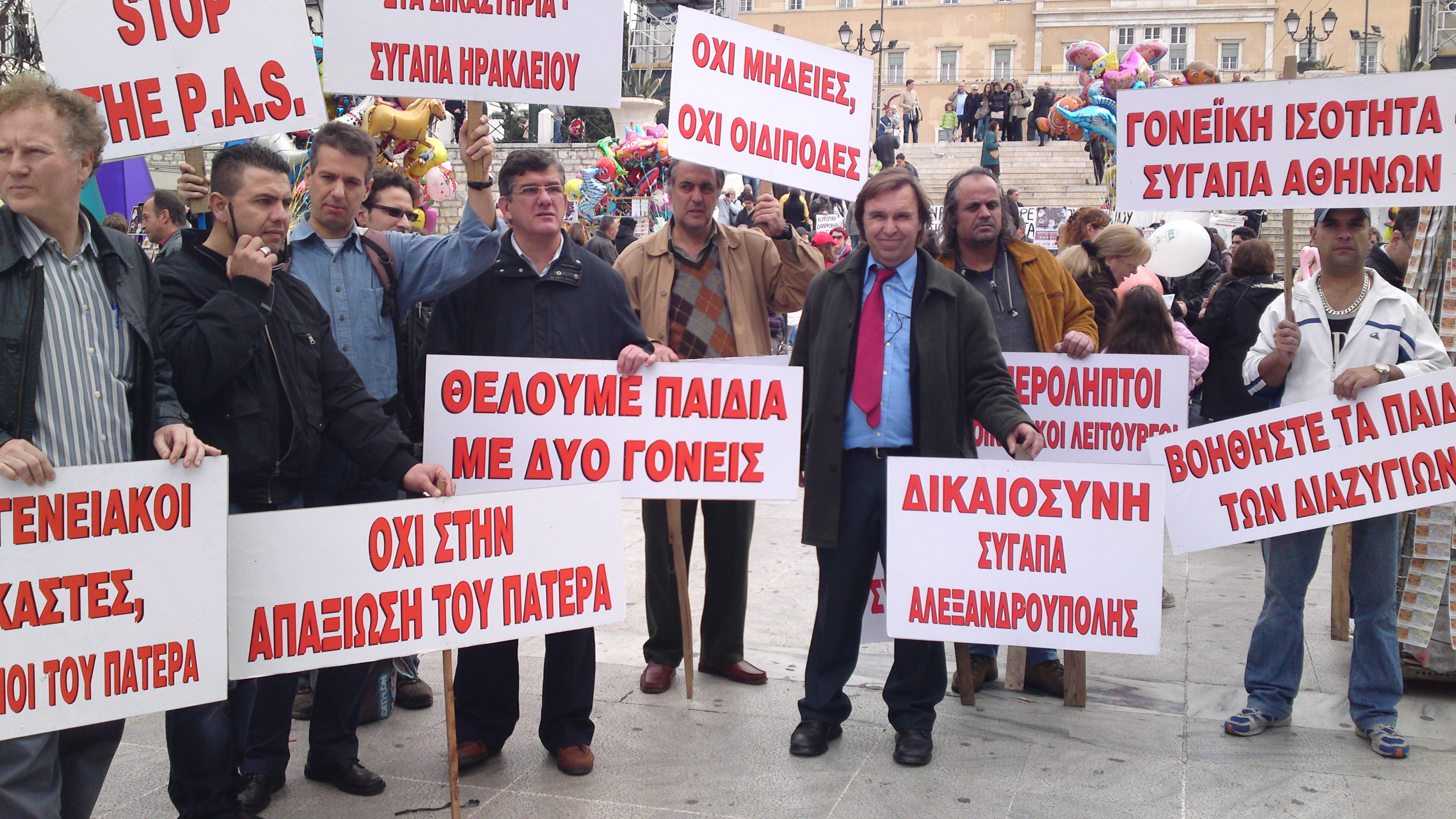
Dads activists of SYGAPA at Athens

== Hungary ==
Shared parenting can be requested from the court by one parent after January 1, 2022. The Family Court has the right to maintain full parents rights after divorce/separation or order shared parenting even upon request of either parents. Post-divorce equal shared parenting is gaining ground, though it is not the most common way of child care after divorce at the present moment.

In principle, during divorce or separation the state takes away the presence and caring of one parent and the revenue share of the other parent from the children. In other words, divorce in Dual Earner Dual Carer family means 100% increase in child raising costs for one of the parents.

The Apák az Igazságért Egyesület, 'Fathers for Justice Association, Hungary', is one non-political organisation promoting fathers' rights. Its main roles are specified as: Social equality, shared custody, the elimination of obstacles to parental contact, help with social services procedures, solving problems with child support awards, filing privacy lawsuit, supporting child custody cases, rights of the children. It has grown from a Facebook group created in 2014.

The main organisation is non-political, called the Association of Divorce Fathers, Hungary (ADF), it was founded in 1989 when NGO's became possible again after 40 years. ADF has Prof. Miklós Hernádi, the writer, as honorary president. The current slogan is "Apák összefognak gyermekeikért" (Fathers Unite for Their Children). ADF activities cover protests, media events, petitions, it offers Fathers'Day programs and free legal counselling.

An activist father group called Eurocsalád Workgroup was formed in 2005 focusing on the legal security of parenthood and family work sharing. A joint petition was followed by a father demonstration protesting against the practically impossible legal access to equal parenting (For the Law of Mind and Heart, 2008). The movement became active on the international scene: a father meeting called ESP-WG 2010 was held in Hotel Mercure Korona, Budapest with guests from 4 countries with the goal to join isolated efforts of local father NGO's into an EU level movement for equal shared parenting. Only 16 months later the Platform for European Fathers (PEF) was founded by 11 member countries in Brussels.

== Ireland ==
Shared parenting is usually only granted by the courts where the children are not a contentious issue and there is broad agreement on their upbringing education etc. The Fathers Rights-Responsibility Party contested the 2007 Irish general election. John Waters of The Irish Times frequently advocates improved father's rights in his weekly op-ed.

== Israel ==
For a developed country with democratic political institutions, the Israeli society is notable for its high birth rate and natalist tendency, for parallel religious family court systems in the Judiciary of Israel and for its diverse origins and ideologies including radical feminism and orthodox fundamentalism. Although the majority religion Judaism has a patriarchal tradition, mothers enjoy increasing legislated advantages promoted by the Knesset Committee on the Status of Women and Gender Equality. In comparison to the well funded feminist establishment, fathers' and men's rights groups, political efforts and media have been poor, small and sporadic.

Fathers' rights activists have unsuccessfully run in Knesset elections both in their own abortive parties such as Man's Rights in the Family Party and in joint lists. There have been many protest vigils, demonstrations and marches against alleged discriminatory divorce laws and gender biased family court practices. In 2014 an appeal to the United Nations Commission on Human Rights resulted in a UN condemnation of Israel for discrimination against divorced fathers. Several civil lawsuits in the USA courts have been filed by Israeli fathers against Israeli family justice and social services officials and women's organizations alleging human rights violations. In particular, Israeli fathers' rights activists have protested the Tender Years' Clause (which in 2016 was slightly amended in Knesset) and family court practice to award custody of children to the mother in all but exceptional cases.

Additional calls for reform include: the high rates of alimony and child support imposed regardless of economic capability; the loss of freedom of movement by the liberal use of no-exit court orders prohibiting fathers (including fathers not in arrears) from leaving the country unless guaranteeing all future child support by deposit of money or sureties; gender biased prevention of domestic violence laws that are misused by divorcing women to evict fathers from their homes and disconnect them from their children—alongside women's legal exemption from prosecution for filing false accusations; the promotion of parental alienation, and; the high rate of fathers forced to see their children in supervised visitation "contact centers" due to false claims of child abuse.

On child custody law, in 2008 the Ministry of Justice appointed Schnitt Commission, chaired by Professor Dan Schnitt, majority report recommended that shared custody be the default arrangement. On January 19, 2012, then Justice Minister Yaakov Neeman announced that he accepted the Schnitt Commission's finding. A weakened amendment was enacted in 2016. Court adoption and implementation is reportedly rare in Spring 2017.

Similarly child support law was amended in November 2014 following the recommendation of the Shiffman Commission to consider the income of both parents. A few court rulings have divided child support between both parents, but the religious rabbinical courts oppose this non-traditional rule.

== Italy ==
On May 18, 2007, members of the Fathers' Armada protested to highlight their claim that only women have rights after a divorce. Delegates met with the Equal Opportunities Minister, Barbara Pollastrini, who pledged support.

== Japan ==
Father's Rights in Japan (FRIJ) and Children's Rights Network Japan are campaigning to change the current legal position which allows the abduction of the child by the mother with no legal redress. K Net is campaigning in Japanese. International child custody disputes in Japan also spawn fathers' rights organizations such as Help Dads Organization (HDO) as well as Find My Parent (FMP), cofounded by Frenchman Vincent Fichot who went on a 21-day hunger strike during the Tokyo Olympics in 2021 .

== Spain ==
Recent changes in regional laws in Spain, such as in Aragon, establish joint custody as the preferred regime. In 2009, 84,1% gave sole custody to the mother, 5,6% to the father and 9,6% were given joint custody. The Father's Rights in Spain (CCPMI) is a movement supporting equal rights and obligations in the raising and the education of children after a divorce or separation.

== New Zealand ==
Members of the fathers' rights movement raise awareness about the need for shared parenting in New Zealand by sponsoring an award-winning website, holding meetings, and protesting publicly from their War-4-Kids wagon. Fathers of New Zealand sponsors a website that offers advice to help fathers succeed in family court.

== Netherlands ==
The fathers movement in the Netherlands started in the end of the 70's of the previous century after the introduction of no-fault divorce laws combined with single parent care familycourt practices putting children in single parent care of mainly mothers without any access provisions in family law to also protect and secure the care and contact of children from and with their fathers. During the first decade several initiatives, groups and organisations emerged and then disappeared again. By 1989 the "Stichting Kind en Omgangsrecht" (Dutch Foundation for Children and Access) was formed, which was renamed in 2003 into the "Stichting Vader Kennis Centrum" (Dutch Father Knowledge Centre Foundation).

In May 2007 the Dutch father and equal parenting organisations have addressed Dutch Parliament with a Joint Manifesto to legislate for an equal parenting presumption (in Dutch: 'gelijkwaardig ouderschap') in Dutch family law. As a result, in the Dutch family law change of 2009 a 'Right for children to be cared for and raised by both their parents equally' was introduced by a constitutional majority vote in the Dutch Parliament in support of an equal parenting amendment that was forwarded by the Dutch Socialist Party (SP). However, since then the familycourt practices of giving single parent care to mainly mothers have remained largely unchanged. This in fact is a classic case and example of conservative familycourts and judges involved in the practice of 'legislating from the bench' by largely ignoring instead of interpreting and applying new legislation as it was adopted by the Dutch parliament in 2009.

== Norway ==
Laws on Children were introduced in 1981. Several changes has been made since then, the latest January 1, 2009. The letter of the laws are very similar to those of Germany. The Family Activist Movement started to become a force in Norway in the mid-1980s with the introduction of F2F (Foreningen 2 Foreldre). Today F2F is by most Norwegian activists considered as a political organisation that speak according to what the government want to be the official truth, that mothers are best fit to be single parents. However, several researchers in Norway have found that mothers are actually more dangerous to their children than fathers.

In 2004 the first Men's Day (October 7) was held in Oslo. Only the Ombud of Gender Equality was represented and held a speech in front of Stortinget (The Parliament) in 2004. All other public institutions, including the Ombud for Children, refused to participate. The extreme radical feminist organisation, Ottar have tried to ridicule the Men's Day, but there are still Family Activists that keep it as an official day to argue for Children-, Men's- and Fathers Rights.

In 2006 the organisation Far og Barn [Father and Child(ren)] was started. Later that year another family organisation in Norway, was founded. Familiestiftelsen was established in December 2006 partly after the Swedish model. Familiestiftelsen use the Swedish Pappa-Barn logo.

In 2010 Far og Barn started.

== Poland ==
Polish Fathers want a rebuttable presumption for shared parenting in Polish law. A new law is currently being worked on. The Polish Parliament should pass it shortly.

Active Fathers organizations are Stowarzyszenie Prawo Dziecka DzielnyTata.pl, Inicjatywa Społeczna Porozumienie Rawskie PorozumienieRawskie.pl, Rodzice Pomorza and a web portal www.opiekarownowazna.pl. These groups are active to highlight their claim that only women have rights after a divorce. Delegates work in Senate and Parliament to pass the new co-parenting law.

== Romania ==
There are two fathers' organisations in Romania. Historically the first organization was Alianța Națională a Taților din România (known as ANTR). This was followed by Alianța Antidiscriminare a Tuturor Tăticilor (known as TATA, meaning "father" in Romanian). Both organizations have been relatively inactive in the past few years. One main success of TATA was the recognition of the Father's Day by Romanian legislation. In 2009 Romanian Association for Joint Custody (known as ARPCC or Asociația Română pentru Custodia Comună) was built. Rather than focusing on the "father's right" ARPCC positioned as a gender-neutral organization focusing solely on the best practices regarding custody (main focus on training for specialists, jurisprudence gathering and lobby for legislation changes) ARPCC had several successes in relation with the state authority: Change of the Child Protection Act in Romania (Law 257/2013) and some other actions to unify the jurisprudence. One last achievement is the influence on the jurisprudence regarding the parental alienation. Parental alienation training was delivered on several occasions to Family Law Judges and as a result the alienation phenomena is relatively known in the Courts in Romania. ARPCC continues to be pretty active on the landscape of "shared parenting" and "alienation"

== Russia ==
Fathers International was founded in June 2010 as a citizens' movement standing for fathers' parenting/custodial rights and children's rights to be raised in a full family. Its members see their task in providing public control over the state officials and legal bodies in an area of obeying Russian Constitution and Family Code, that guarantee equal parental rights which are systematically violated by the authorities.

== Sweden ==
If one of the parents wants a change in custody, the question of custody may be decided by a court. The same applies to the questions of which of the parents the child is to live with and how access for the other parent is to be organised. In divorce proceedings, moreover, the court must, in the absence of a claim, award custody of the child to one of the parents if joint custody is manifestly incompatible with the welfare of the child. This Law, passed in 2006, has resulted in significant majority of all court cases in which sole custody is requested, being awarded to the mother.

If a child is born to an unmarried mother, the mother gains sole custody automatically unless she elects to, in her sole decision, agree to shared custody.

In Sweden there are four organizations that fight for fathers rights in custody disputes. MinPappa (the largest with soon 4000 members) revealed that 4 out of 5 fathers were discriminated by court as the mothers received sole custody. They also revealed one court in Sweden, in Lund, that had not given custody to any fathers. Pappa-Barn, is one of the best known lobby organisation in Sweden which have a large membership of fathers and mothers supporting equal gender rights in custody. PapaLiv is another big lobby organisation with more than 1000 members. MinPappa is a smaller organisation located in the south of Sweden and more helpful for fathers who need help.

Parental Alienation and Parental Alienation Syndrome are unrecognized by the courts and psychologists of Sweden. The Alliance for the Child ("Allians för Barnen") is a social initiative to connect interdisciplinary scholars into a competence network engaging in informing political decision-makers in Sweden, Scandinavia and Europe about Parental Alienation Disorder (PAD). This condition, coined by Professor William Bernet, Professor of Psychiatry at Vanderbilt University, USA, is defined as one of several forms of emotional child abuse. It has been active since the late 70's in media by publishing articles in the press (Svenska Dagbladet, Brännpunkt: Barns rätt till två föräldrar - "Children's rights to two parents", Dec 27, 1979), in Swedish Radio (P1: Tendens), and, recently on the social debate media Newsmill (Ny Lag behövs till stöd för barn som berövas sina pappor - "A new law is required to support children deprived of their fathers")

== United Kingdom ==
The fathers' rights movement in the UK consists of a variety of groups, ranging from charities, self-help groups to civil disobedience activists. The movement can be traced to the founding in 1974 of Families Need Fathers, though the organization does not see itself as a fathers' rights organisation, pointing out that its primary focus is on the children's right to have a meaningful relationship with their fathers. FNF provides self-help support groups, promotes research into shared parenting, and lobbies political for legal changes in the family law system in the UK. It has been credited with several successes. The founding of Fathers 4 Justice in 2003 brought the cause of fathers' rights to public attention with high-profile stunts with members dressing as comic book superheroes and other easily recognizable characters to scale public buildings and monuments. With time their protests became increasingly controversial, and internal strife divided the group. It was briefly disbanded in January 2006 following a suggestion that Prime Minister Tony Blair's son be briefly kidnapped, though further protests by a F4J splinter groups, the 'Real F4J' and New Fathers 4 Justice, have occurred. Fathers 4 Justice reformed in May 2006 Fathers 4 Justice. Other fathers' rights activists have been criticized for harassment, threats and illegal activities, including fraud. In the UK, fathers' rights groups have advocated for changes to the Child Support Act including child support, shared parenting and access to children and lack of enforcement of court orders. Pressure from the fathers' movement has influenced the UK Government, which published a draft Children (Contact) and Adoption Bill in February 2005 that aims to widen judges' powers in dealing with parents who obstruct their ex-partner from seeing their children.

Bob Geldof reported that of the approximately 15,000 custodial cases that are resolved in family courts each year, only 7% of fathers in the UK are allowed to live with their children, and that 4 out of 10 fathers lose all touch with their children permanently. He reports that family courts think it extremely unhealthy for a man to articulate his love for his children. He states that 1 in 4 children live in single parent homes, children who grow up without their fathers are 5 times as likely to be unemployed and 3 times as likely to be involved in crime, 80% of all social housing is for single parent families, and that taxpayer costs for fatherlessness are at least £15B per year.

== Turkey ==
The fathers' rights movement in Turkey emerged with the founding of Divorced Fathers in Istanbul in 2006 to create awareness on Parental Alienation, Parental Alienation Syndrome. The movement has protested Turkish family laws, which they pointed out, discriminated against men in child custody, alimony, child support settlements and in a presumption of maternal custody. They requested legal shared custody and physical shared custody and new laws reflecting more rights of child visitation. They also demanded better enforcement of child visitation rights and highlighted that it was against human rights and rights of children in UN to enforce child visitation rights by defining child as things per laws and requested to transfer the responsibility of enforcement of child visitation rights to Family and Social Policies Ministry to provide humanistic methods .

They have established different groups to organize their activities and raise their voices on PA (Parental Alienation) and PAS (Parental Alienation Syndrome). These groups are called Divorced Fathers Platform "Bosanmis Babalar Platformu". Aggrieved Fathers "Magdur Babalar" and Divorced Fathers and Family Platform "Bosanmis Babalar ve Aile Platformu". As a result of the movements, A Sub-Committee assigned by Turkish Parliament and representatives of platforms have had serious of sessions and have written a report to be given to the Parliament to make necessary changes on Turkish Family Law to recognize and protect the following rights:

- Legal Shared Custody
- Physical Shared Custody
- New enforcements to assure Child visitation rights
- New enforcements and new measures to prevent Parental Alienation

== United States ==
The fathers' rights movement in the US emerged with the founding of Divorce Racket Busters in California in 1960 to protest Californian divorce laws which they stated discriminated against men in alimony, child support settlements and in a presumption of maternal custody. The group expanded into other states, changing its name to Divorce Reform in 1961. With the increase in divorce rates in the 1960s and 1970s, more local grassroots men's organization grew up devoted to divorce reform, and by the 1980s, there were a total of more than 200 fathers' rights groups active in almost every state. These groups focused their actions on what they viewed as sex discrimination in family law, by engaging in political activities such as lobbying state legislatures, filing class action suits, picketing courthouses, and monitoring judges' decisions through "court watches". The 1990s saw the emergence of new and larger organizations such as National Fatherhood Initiative and the American Fathers coalition. Several attempts have been made to found a national organization to which local fathers' rights organizations could belong, however this has been difficult to achieve. As a result, the movement remains mainly a loose coalition of local groups.
