= Custody of Infants Act 1873 =

Act of the Parliament of the United Kingdom

Custody of Infants Act 1873 (Note: The citation of this act by this short title was authorised by section 1 of, and the first schedule to, the Short Titles Act 1896. Due to the repeal of those provisions it is now authorised by section 19(2) of the Interpretation Act 1978.)
- Act of Parliament
- Parliament of the United Kingdom
- Long title: An Act to amend the Law as to the Custody of Infants.
- Citation: 36 & 37 Vict. c. 12
- Territorial extent: United Kingdom

Dates
- Royal assent: 24 April 1873
- Commencement: 24 April 1873 (Note: The Acts of Parliament (Commencement) Act 1793.)
Other legislation
Repeals/revokes	Custody of Infants Act 1839
Amended by	Statute Law Revision Act 1883; Statute Law Revision (No. 2) Act 1893; Guardianship Act 1973

Status: Partially repealed

Text of statute as originally enacted

The Custody of Infants Act 1873 (36 & 37 Vict. c. 12) is an act of the Parliament of the United Kingdom. It was signed into law on 24 April 1873.

== Provisions ==
Section 1 of the act allowed the Court of Chancery to order that a mother would have access to, or custody of, any infants under sixteen years of age; or to order that any such infants in her custody were to remain so subject to any regulations for the access of the father or guardian.

Section 2 provided that no agreement in a deed of separation between the father and mother was to be held invalid simply for providing that the custody or control of the children lay with the mother, with the important caveat that no court was bound to enforce any such agreement if it felt it would not be to the benefit of the infant.

Section 3 repealed the Custody of Infants Act 1839 (2 & 3 Vict. c. 54).

== Subsequent developments ==
The whole act repealed for the Republic of Ireland by section 4 of the Guardianship of Infants Act 1964.
