= Guardianship of Infants Act 1964 =

The Guardianship of Infants Act of 1964 was an Act of the Parliament of the Republic of Ireland. It was signed into law on 25 March 1964.

This Act governs the law relating to guardianship and custody of children in the Republic of Ireland. The Act consists of three parts; Part I: Preliminary and General (Section 1–4), Part II: Guardianship (Sections 5–12), and Part III: Enforcement of Right of Custody (Sections 13–18).

== Acts referred to ==
- Adoption Act 1952, No. 25.
- Courts (Supplemental Provisions) Act 1961, No. 39.
- Guardianship of Infants Act 1886, c. 27.
- Wills Act 1837, c. 26.
- Health Act 1947, No. 28.
- Health Authorities Act 1960, No. 9.
- Health Act 1953, No. 26.
