= Joint custody in the United States =

Court order in U.S. family law

Joint custody is an agreement or court order where custody of a child both parents share custody of their children. In the United States, there are two forms of joint custody, joint physical custody (called also "shared parenting" or "shared custody") and joint legal custody. In joint physical custody, the lodging and care of the child is shared according to an agreed-upon or court-ordered parenting schedule with equal or close to equal parenting time. In joint legal custody, both parents share the ability to make decisions about the child, regarding e.g. education, medical care and religion, and both can access their children's educational and health records.

It is possible for a court to make separate determinations of legal and physical custody. It is common to combine joint legal custody with sole physical custody and visitation, but the opposite is rare. In joint physical custody both parents are custodial parents and neither parent is a non-custodial parent.

Joint custody is distinct from sole custody. In sole physical custody, the child's lives primarily in the home of one parent while the children may have visitation with the other parent. In sole legal custody, one parent is assigned the exclusive right to make decisions concerning the children's important life activities, such as choice of school or doctor, and authorization of medical treatment or counseling. Joint custody is different from split custody, an arrangement in which one parent has sole custody over some of the parents' children, and the other parent has sole custody over the other children.

== History ==
In England, prior to the nineteenth century, common law considered children to be the property of their father. However, the economic and social changes that occurred during the nineteenth century lead to a shift in ideas about the dynamics of the family. Industrialization separated the home and the workplace, keeping fathers away from their children in order to earn wages and provide for their family. Conversely, mothers were expected to stay in the home and care for the household and the children. Important social changes such as women's suffrage and child development theories allowed for ideas surrounding the importance of maternal care.

There has been a major shift which is favoring joint custody in the United States court system, which began in the mid-1980s. This change has shifted the emphasis from having the need for the child to have an attachment to one "psychological" parent to the need to have an ongoing relationship between both parents.

Originally, joint legal custody meant joint custody. In this joint legal custody arrangement, the child's parents shared responsibility over discussing issues related to the child-rearing. In these arrangements with joint legal custody, one of the parents was awarded physical custody, which designated them as the primary parent, or one of the parents was allowed to determine the primary residence of the children. Though this implied that both parents had a "significant period" of time with the children, it did nothing to ensure this factor, which meant that the parent without primary custody of the child could end up having little opportunity to see his or her children.

In many U.S. states, joint custody is increasingly used with the presumption of equal shared parenting, however, in most states, it is still viewed as creating a necessity to provide each of the parents with "significant periods" of physical custody to ensure the children "frequent and continuing contact" with both parents.

=== Shared parenting legislation ===
A number of states have considered or passed laws that create a rebuttable legal presumption in favor of shared parenting in a custody case.

== Joint legal custody ==
Joint legal custody grants parents joint decision-making rights for important decisions that affect their minor children. The parents jointly decide how to raise their children in matters of schooling, spirituality, social events, sports religion, medical concerns, and other important decisions. Both parents have equal decision-making status where the welfare and safety of the children is concerned. This generally means that both parents must be involved for major legal matters concerning their children, but that ordinary "day-to-day" matters and issues are left to the discretion of the parent who is providing physical care for the children at the time the decision is made. Also, with joint legal custody, both parents share the ability to access to their children's records, including educational records, health records, and other records.

Joint legal custody can be combined with either joint physical custody or with sole physical custody and visitation rights. In a custody order, it's common for one parent to have physical custody and the other parent to have some sort of visitation rights, but legal custody is awarded separately. Thus, even when one parent is the primary custodian, joint legal custody may be awarded to both parents.

=== Advantages ===
When parents have joint legal custody to share important decision-making that affect their child, both parents may be more proactive in their child's upbringing, and the parents may experience less animosity and negativity in their co-parenting relationship. Parents may also communicate more effectively with each other, and they may exhibit feelings of well-being as a result of their working together to make decisions based on their child's needs. Proponents argue that it is good for children to see that their parents can work together, and over time joint legal custody has the potential to reverse some of the emotional effects of divorce on the children.

=== Disadvantages ===
Joint legal custody arrangements may be problematic when one parent attempts to control the majority of decisions in the child's life without regard to the other parent. Attempts to share decision-making may then cause one or both parents to become combative and argue over many decisions that need to be made about their children, resulting in significant stress to the parents and their children.

== Joint physical custody ==
In joint physical custody, also known as shared parenting, the child has a legal residence or domicile in both parents' homes, and the lodging and care of the child is shared according to a court-ordered "parenting plan" or "parenting schedule"). In some states joint physical custody means equal or close to equal shared parenting time, while other states define it as an obligation to provide each of the parents with "significant periods" of parenting time so as to assure the child of "frequent and continuing contact" with both parents. For example, states such as Alabama, California, and Texas do not necessarily require joint physical custody orders to result in substantially equal parenting time, whereas states such as Arizona, Georgia, and Louisiana do require joint custody orders to result in substantially equal parenting time where feasible. Courts generally have not clearly defined what "significant periods" and "frequent and continuous contact" mean, which requires parents to litigate to find out. In some states, however, courts have provided a clear definition, for instance, in Nevada, the Supreme Court has defined joint physical custody as an arrangement where each parent has at least 40% of the parenting time on a yearly basis.

=== Frequency ===
In 2005/06, about 5 percent of American children ages 11 to 15 lived in a joint physical custody arrangement versus sole physical custody.

=== Laws ===
States tend to have one of three approaches to joint physical custody.

1. A rebuttable presumption in favor of shared parenting as being in the best interest of the child, so that this is the default option with exceptions made when there is child abuse or neglect. In 2018, Kentucky became the first state to enact a shared parenting presumption law.
2. Specification of joint physical custody as an option on par with sole custody, without a legal presumption either way. As examples, Arizona passed such a law in 2012, Missouri in 2016 and Virginia in 2018.
3. No mention of joint physical custody as a suitable option, although a judge may still grant it if both parents agree or if the judge consider it to be in the best interest of the child.

=== Parenting schedules ===
There are many different parenting schedules that gives the child equal time with each parent. Some common examples are:

- Every other week, also known as "week on, week off".
- The 2-2-5-5 schedule, where the child spends every Monday and Tuesday with one parent, every Wednesday and Thursday with the other parent, and then every other weekend, as follows:

Week	Monday	Tuesday	Wednesday	Thursday	Friday	Saturday	Sunday
Week 1	Mother	Mother	Father	Father	Mother	Mother	Mother
Week 2	Mother	Mother	Father	Father	Father	Father	Father
Week 3	Mother	Mother	Father	Father	Mother	Mother	Mother
Week 4	Mother	Mother	Father	Father	Father	Father	Father

- The 2-2-3 schedule, where the child spends e.g. Monday and Tuesday with parent #1, Wednesday and Thursday with parent #2, Friday to Sunday with parent #1, the next Monday and Tuesday with parent #2, the next Wednesday and Thursday with parent #1, and the following weekend Friday to Sunday with parent #2, and so on.
- The 3-4-4-3 schedule, where the child always spends the same three days with one parent, such as Sunday through Tuesday, and another three days with the other parent, such as Wednesday through Friday, and every other Saturday with each parent.
- Alternating every 2 days
- Splitting longer periods of time between the parents, such as two weeks or a month. If the periods are very long, such as a year, it is typically called alternating custody.
- Children may spend all weekends and some holidays with one parent, but most weekdays with the other parent. This can be useful if the parents live far from each other, or, if one parent always work on weekends.

=== Bird's nest custody ===
Bird's nest custody is an uncommon form of joint physical custody in which, rather than having the children go from one parent's house to the other parent's house, the parents move in and out of the house in which the children constantly reside. The goal of this arrangement is to shift the burden of upheaval and moving between homes onto the parents rather than the children. However, due to the high cost of maintaining three households, one for each parent and one for the children, it's rarely a viable option in a custody case.

=== Advantages ===
Unless one of the parents is abusive, neglectful and/or mentally ill, the children tend to fare better in a joint physical custody arrangement.

Children benefit from having both parents involved in their upbringing, and joint physical custody facilitates that. Children in a joint custody arrangement are more likely to have outcomes similar to children from intact families, and to fare better than children in sole custody arrangements. It allows for children to be exposed to both parents as role-models, something that is not necessarily ensured by other custody arrangements.

Children in joint physical custody report higher self-esteem and lower levels of behavioral issues and greater overall post-divorce adjustment as opposed to children in sole custody arrangements. They also report greater levels of satisfaction with the division of time between their parents and children, feeling less torn between their parents, and feeling closer to both parents. Children that have easygoing, adaptable temperaments are more likely to benefit from the transitions that they experience with a shared parenting arrangement.

Even when there is conflict between the parents, children benefit from joint physical custody. Parents in joint physical custody arrangements report lower levels of conflict with one another, as compared to those in sole custody arrangements. Joint physical custody is associated with more positive parental relationships, effective parenting, and lower inter-parental conflict; key factors that ensure a child's well-being following divorce.

Children in joint physical custody arrangements are more likely to have better relationships with their families, better performance in their schools, higher levels of self-esteem, and fewer conduct and emotional issues.

=== Disadvantages ===
Joint physical custody is harmful when there is a parent "with major deficits in how they care for their children, such as parents who neglect or abuse their children, and those from whom children would need protection and distance even in intact families".

Joint physical custody is not suitable when a child has a relationship with only one of the parents and no prior relationship with the other parent, or only a peripheral relationship. Different parenting plans will then better serve the goal of establishing and building the new parent-child relationship.

If the parents live far from each other, joint physical custody means more traveling time for the child compared to sole physical custody, both between the parents and between one of their homes and their school.

Some commentators believe that infants and preschoolers do not benefit from joint custody arrangements due to the importance of a consistent routine and the security of a primary attachment figure at that age. However, a consensus report published in an American Psychological Association journal that was endorsed by experts on attachment, early child development, and divorce, has rejected that perspective.

Another concern that may be raised by joint physical custody is that the children's parents are in frequent contact with each other than in other custodial arrangements, and that contact may increase conflict and thereby negatively impact all parties involved, including the children. However, numerous studies have found that joint physical custody reduces the levels of conflict.

Some critics of joint physical custody express concern that frequent ping-pong moves back and forth between their parents' homes will have a negative emotional impact on children, and that the children may develop the feeling that there is "Mom's House" and "Dad's House", and no residence that a child may consider to be "my home".

== Advocacy ==
Advocates for joint physical custody assert that it is in the best interest of children, with exceptions for child abuse and neglect, and assert that shared parenting can reduce family disruption, improve the welfare of children, and reduce domestic violence. Organizations that advocate for shared parenting include the Children's Rights Council, and the National Parents Organization, which operates nationally and through state chapters, and Leading Women for Shared Parenting.

In 2014, a group of 110 researchers and mental health practitioners endorsed a consensus report supporting the view that shared parenting should be the norm for parenting plans for children of all ages, including very young children. In 2018, scientists and practitioners at the conference of the International Council on Shared Parenting called upon governments and professional associations to identify shared parenting as a fundamental right of the child.

While joint parenting has become a national norm, some organizations urge restraint or oppose presumptions in favor of joint parenting. For example, the National Organization of Women opposes "one size fits all" presumptions that it believes can increase the risk of domestic violence and undermine judicial discretion. The League of Women Voters is largely neutral on the subject, but in the past some chapters have asserted that custody decisions should accord with the best interests of the child, and that presumptions should not overcome a child's best interest.

== See also ==
- Child custody
- Child custody laws in the United States
- Child support
- Divorce
- Family court
- Family law
- Parens patriae
- Parenting plan
- Shared parenting
- Sole custody
- Split custody
- Third-party custody
- Ward of the state
