= Scoundrels =

Scoundrel or Scoundrels may refer to:

== Books ==
- Scoundrel, a 1996 romance novel by Elizabeth Elliott
- Scoundrel (book), a 2022 book by Sarah Weinman
- Scoundrel (novel), a 2004 novel by Bernard Cornwell
- Scoundrels (novel), a 2017 novel by Duncan Crowe and James Peak
- Star Wars: Scoundrels, a 2013 novel by Timothy Zahn

== Other uses ==
- Kaminey, or Scoundrels, a 2009 Indian action film by Vishal Bhardwaj
- Scoundrels (band), a UK blues-rock band
- "Scoundrels" (Law & Order episode), a 1994 episode of Law & Order
- Scoundrels (TV series), a 2010 comedy-drama TV series on ABC
- The Scoundrels, an American band, formed by members of The Echoes (American group)
- Scoundrel (restaurant), a restaurant in Greenville, South Carolina
- "Scoundrels", a song by Lovejoy from their 2025 album One Simple Trick

== See also ==
- The Scoundrel (disambiguation)
- Dirty Rotten Scoundrels (disambiguation)
