= Impekoven =

Impekoven is a surname. Notable people with this surname include:

- Frieda Impekoven (1880–after 1966), woman who protected Jews during the Holocaust
- Niddy Impekoven (1904–2002), German dancer
- Sabine Impekoven (1889–1970), German film actress
- Toni Impekoven (1881–1947), German actor and writer
