= The Scoundrel =

The Scoundrel may refer to:

- The Scoundrel (play), a 1924 play by Hans Reimann and Toni Impekoven
- The Scoundrel (1931 film), a German film
- The Scoundrel (1935 film), an American film
- The Scoundrel (1939 film), a German film
- An alternate English-language title for The Married Couple of the Year Two, a 1971 French film
- The Scoundrel (1988 film), an Azerbaijani film
- Kaminey: The Scoundrel, a 2009 Indian action film by Vishal Bhardwaj
- Enough Stupidity in Every Wise Man, an 1868 play also known as The Scoundrel

== See also ==
- Scoundrels (disambiguation)
