= Two Times Lotte =

1950 film

- Directed by: Josef von Báky
- Written by: Erich Kästner
- Produced by: Günther Stapenhorst
- Starring: Antje Weisgerber; Peter Mosbacher; Isa Günther; Jutta Günther
- Cinematography: Walter Riml; Franz Weihmayr
- Edited by: Fritz Stapenhorst
- Music by: Alois Melichar
- Production companies: Carlton-Film; Bavaria Film
- Distributed by: Döring-Film
- Release date: 1 December 1950
- Running time: 105 minutes
- Country: West Germany
- Language: German

Two Times Lotte (German: Das doppelte Lottchen) is a 1950 West German film, directed by Josef von Báky, starring Antje Weisgerber, Peter Mosbacher, and Isa and Jutta Günther. It was made by Bavaria Film at the Emelka Studios near Munich, and its sets were designed by the art directors Robert Herlth and Willy Schatz.

Based on the 1949 children's novel of the same name by Erich Kästner, who also provided the screenplay and narration, Two Times Lotte is a faithful adaptation of the book compared to Disney's better known version released eleven years later.

== Plot ==
As with the novel, the film follows the story of Luise Palfy and Lotte Körner, identical twin girls who were separated at two years old when their parents, Ludwig Palfy and Luiselotte Körner, divorced and split them up. Reuniting at a German all-girls' summer camp seven and a half years later, the two sisters switch places to be with the parents they were parted from.

== Cast ==
- Isa Günther as Luise Palfy
- Jutta Günther as Lotte Körner
- Antje Weisgerber as Luiselotte Körner
- Peter Mosbacher as Ludwig Palfy, Opera House Music Director
- Senta Wengraf as Irene Gerlach
- Hans Olden as Dr Strobl
- Auguste Pünkösdy as Resi
- Maria Krahn as Mrs Muthesius
- Gustav Waldau
- Liesl Karlstadt as Mrs Wagenthaler
- Inge Rosenberg as Miss Ulrike
- Gaby Philipp as Miss Gerda
- Walter Ladengast as Mr Gabele
- Gertrud Wolle as Miss Linnekogel
- Hertha von Hagen
- Liselotte Berker
- Rudolf Rhomberg as Mr Eipeldauer
- Gerda Sommerschuh
- Ina Gerhein
- Katja Sabo
- Paul Kuen
- Friedrich Bender
- Erich Kästner as the Narrator
- Senta Berger as Extra
- Carolin Reiber as Schülerin

== Bibliography ==
- Davidson, John & Hake, Sabine. Framing the Fifties: Cinema in a Divided Germany. Berghahn Books, 2007.
