= The Court Concert (1948 film) =

1948 film

- German film poster
- German: Das kleine Hofkonzert
- Directed by: Paul Verhoeven
- Written by: Paul Verhoeven
- Based on: Das kleine Hofkonzert by Toni Impekoven and Paul Verhoeven
- Produced by: Fritz Klotsch
- Starring: Elfie Mayerhofer; Hans Nielsen; Erich Ponto
- Cinematography: Eugen Klagemann; Fritz Arno Wagner
- Music by: Wolfgang Zeller
- Production company: Tobis Film
- Distributed by: Sovexport Film (E.Germany); Atlantic-Filmverleih (W. Germany)
- Release date: 17 December 1948
- Running time: 70 minutes
- Country: Germany
- Language: German

The Court Concert (German: Das kleine Hofkonzert) is a 1948 German musical comedy film written and directed by Paul Verhoeven and starring Elfie Mayerhofer, Hans Nielsen and Erich Ponto. In the United States it was released as Palace Scandal.

It is based on the 1935 musical comedy The Court Concert (music: Edmund Nick) which Verhoeven had co-written. A previous film version was made in 1936 and directed by Douglas Sirk. The remake was shot using agfacolor. Both productions are in the tradition of operetta films.

It was produced by the major studio Tobis Film during 1944, but was not given a formal release until 1948 in Sweden and then East and West Germany the following year.

The art director Otto Erdmann worked on the film's sets. Location shooting took place in Bavaria.

== Cast ==
- Elfie Mayerhofer as Christine Holm
- Hans Nielsen as Leutnant Walter von Arneck
- Erich Ponto as Serenissimus
- Hans Leibelt as Hofmarschall von Arneck
- Harald Paulsen as Kommissionsrat Zunder
- Paul Henckels as Emil Knirps, Poet
- Josef Eichheim as Möhrchen
- Otto Stoeckel
- Hans Hermann Schaufuß as Hofkapellmeister
- Victor Janson
- Albert Florath as Oberst Flumms
- Walter Klam
- Erwin Biegel as Pfarrer
- Valy Arnheim
- Walter Bechmann
- Otto Braml
- Egon Brosig
- Peter Busse
- Fanny Cotta
- Karl Dannemann
- Gertrud de Lalsky
- Karl Deppen
- Erich Dunskus
- Else Ehser
- Olga Engl
- Karl Etlinger
- Adolf Fischer
- Hildegard Grethe
- Bruno Harprecht
- Knut Hartwig
- Helmuth Helsig
- Julius E. Hermann
- Käthe Jöken-König
- Olga Limburg
- Alfred Maack
- Friedrich Maurer
- Hadrian Maria Netto
- Friedrich Petermann
- Paul Rehkopf
- Josef Reithofer
- Just Scheu
- Karl Ludwig Schreiber
- Alfred Stein
- Werner Stock
- Toni Tetzlaff
- Otz Tollen
- Heinrich Troxbömker
- Petra Unkel
- Hubert von Meyerinck
- Kurt von Ruffin
- Borwin Walth
- Paul Westermeier
- Anneliese Würtz

== See also ==
- Überläufer
