= Hans Reimann =

Hans Reimann may refer to:

- Hans Reimann (writer) (1889–1969), German satirist, novelist, and playwright
- Hans-Georg Reimann (born 1941), East German race walker
