= The Court Concert =

1936 film

- DVD Cover
- Directed by: Detlef Sierck
- Written by: Toni Impekoven (play); Paul Verhoeven (play); Kurt Heynicke; Franz Wallner-Basté; Douglas Sirk
- Produced by: Bruno Duday
- Starring: Mártha Eggerth; Johannes Heesters; Kurt Meisel; Herbert Hübner
- Cinematography: Franz Weihmayr
- Edited by: Erich Kobler
- Music by: Edmund Nick; Ferenc Vecsey
- Production company: UFA
- Distributed by: UFA
- Release date: 18 December 1936
- Running time: 85 minutes
- Country: Germany
- Language: German

The Court Concert (German: Das Hofkonzert) is a 1936 German historical romantic comedy film directed by Detlef Sierck (later known as Douglas Sirk), and starring Mártha Eggerth, Johannes Heesters, and Kurt Meisel. It was made by the largest German studio UFA, based on Das kleine Hofkonzert. It is part of a number of operetta films produced during the 1930s. The film was shot at the Babelsberg Studios in Berlin with sets designed by the art director Fritz Maurischat. A separate French-language version was also released.

It was remade by Tobis Film in the later stages of the Second World War using agfacolor, but the resulting film didn't get a release until 1948.

== Synopsis ==
In the small principality of Immendingen in Germany in 1847, the annual court concert at the palace is in danger of being cancelled, because the court singer Tamara Pinelli has lost her voice due to a broken heart. The Prince sends to Munich for a renowned singer named Belotti, to replace Pinelli. At the same time, the young Christine Holm arrives in Immendingen. Christine's mother has recently died, and she is looking for her father, who met her mother in Immendingern. At the border, Christine meets a border guard, Lieutenant Walter von Arnegg, who falls in love with her. When Christine is accused of being a loose woman by a fellow traveler on her coach, Walter defends Christine and pretends to be her fiancee in order to protect her honor. Walter and Christine begin dating and fall in love.

Christine has brought a poem with her to Immendingen that her mother always carried with her as the only memento of Christine's father. Christine traces the poem's origin to an impoverished poet named Knips, who writes poems for cash for local lovers. Christine visits Knips in his garret apartment and tells him about her search. Knips tells Christine that her mother was once a singer at the royal court. He knew her briefly, and he only knows that Christine's father was a high-ranking man from the royal court. Before Christine can investigate any further, she is expelled from the principality by Minister of State von Arnegg, who wants to end his son's improper relationship with this illegitimately born woman, who does not know her own father, as soon as possible. Walter escorts Christine to the border, on orders from his father. At the border they encounter the coach that was sent to Munich to find Belotti. The driver complains that he failed, but Christine laughs and explains that Belotti is her own stage name. Christine is Belotti. Christine returns to the court of Immendingen with an escort of honor and is presented to the Prince.

Christine continues her search for her father, but her mother's files are locked away in the city archives by order of State Minister von Arnegg. Christine comes to believe that von Arnegg is her father and ends her relationship with Walter, believing him to be her brother. During the rehearsals for the court concert, Pinelli becomes angry at having been replaced and burns the only text of the song that is performed every year, but Christine stuns everyone when she knows the lyrics to the song, which was never performed outside of the palace - it was her mother's favorite song. During the concert, the Prince learns the name of Christine's mother and is overcome with emotion as he listens to Christine sing the same song her mother did, on the same stage her mother did. After the concert, the Prince invites Christine to stay on at court as a chamber singer and tells her she can marry Walter, but Christine refuses because she could not marry her brother. The Prince then reveals that he is her father, and Christine and Walter get engaged. The Prince also invites Knips to live at court, at Christine's suggestion, and appoints him the court poet.

== Cast ==
- Mártha Eggerth as Christine Holm aka Sängerin Belotti
- Johannes Heesters as Leutnant Walter van Arnegg
- Kurt Meisel as Leutnant Florian Schwälble
- Herbert Hübner as Staatsminister von Arnegg
- Ernst Waldow as Damewäschevertreter von Zunder
- Alfred Abel as Dichter Knips
- Hans Hermann Schaufuß as Bibliothekar
- Ingeborg von Kusserow as Zofe Babette
- Hans Richter as Gefreiter der Grenzwache Veit
- Rudolf Platte as Hofkapellmeister
- Rudolf Klein-Rogge as Oberst Flumms
- Iwa Wanja as Sängerin Tamara Pinelli
- Flockina von Platen as Gräfin Hadersdorff
- Otto Treßler as Landesfürst Serenissimus
- Edwin Jürgensen as Theaterintendant
- Günther Ballier as Chefoffizier der Hofarchive
- Ilse Sommer as Jüngere Hofdame
- Werner Stock as Fotograf
- Arnim Suessenguth as Offizier der Hofarchive
- Toni Tetzlaff as Ältere Hofdame
- Theodor Thony as Mitglied des Hoforchesters
- Thea Truhlsen as Vertraute der Sängerin Pinelli
- Inge Vesten as Jüngere Hofdame
- Max Vierlinger as Geiger des Hoforchesters
- Ruth von Zerboni as Vertraute der Gräfin Hadersdorff
- Hildegard Friebel as Jüngere Hofdame
- Hans Halden as Arzt
- Carl Merznicht as Hornbläser des Hoforchesters
- Oscar Sabo as Paukenspieler des Hoforchesters
- Jac Diehl as Mitglied des Hofochesters
- Berthold Ebbecke as Offizier der Hofarchive
- Fritz Eckert as Offizier der Grenzwache
- Johannes Bergfeldt as Lakai beim Hofkonzert
- Fritz Berghof as Drehorgelspieler
- Emmi de Néve
- Rudolf Essek
- Willi Schur

== Bibliography ==
- Hake, Sabine (2001). Popular Cinema of the Third Reich. Austin: University of Texas Press. ISBN 978-0-292-73458-6.
