= Paul Verhoeven (German director) =

German actor and director (1901–1975)

Paul J. Verhoeven
- Born: Paulus Joseph Verhoeven; 23 June 1901; Unna, Prussia, German Empire
- Died: 22 March 1975 (aged 73); Munich, Bavaria, West Germany
- Burial place: Munich Waldfriedhof
- Occupations: Actor; film director; theater director
- Spouse: Doris Kiesow

Paul Joseph Verhoeven (23 June 1901 – 22 March 1975) was a German actor and director.

== Early life ==
Verhoeven was born in the town of Unna. He had 13 siblings. The family lived in modest circumstances.

== Career ==
He directed and acted in over 50 films. He wrote over 20 film scripts, the first of which was Das kleine Hofkonzert in 1935, an operetta with music by Edmund Nick based on a comedy by Verhoeven and Toni Impekoven.

From 1945 to 1948 he was artistic director at the Residenz Theatre/Staatsschauspiel in Munich.

== Personal life and death ==
Verhoeven was married to the actress Doris Kiesow, with whom he had three children: Lis Verhoeven, who became an actress and was the first wife of Mario Adorf; Michael Verhoeven, who became a film director and married Senta Berger; and Monika Verhoeven.

From his relationship with the actress Edith Schultze-Westrum, he had a son, Thomas Schultze-Westrum, who became a zoologist and maker of animal documentaries.

Paul Verhoeven died on stage of a heart attack in 1975 while delivering the eulogy for the recently deceased actress Therese Giehse at the Munich Kammerspiele. He was buried in the Munich Waldfriedhof next to his wife.

== Selected filmography ==
=== Actor ===
- 1936: Der Kaiser von Kalifornien (dir. Luis Trenker), as Barmixer Billy
- 1938: The Stars Shine (dir. Hans H. Zerlett), as Gebauer
- 1940: The Three Codonas (dir. Arthur Maria Rabenalt), as Juwelen-Max
- 1959: People in the Net (dir. Franz Peter Wirth), as Karel
- 1961: Hamlet (dir. Franz Peter Wirth, TV film), as Gravedigger
- 1965: Bernhard Lichtenberg (dir. Peter Beauvais, TV film), as Bernhard Lichtenberg
- 1967: The Dance of Death (dir. Michael Verhoeven), as Edgar
- 1968: Ein Mann namens Harry Brent (dir. Peter Beauvais, TV miniseries, based on Francis Durbridge), as Samuel Fielding
- 1968: Babeck (dir. Wolfgang Becker, TV miniseries), as Körner
- 1969: The Rats (dir. Peter Beauvais, TV film), as Harro Hassenreuter, former theatrical manager
- 1973: Oh Jonathan – oh Jonathan! (dir. Franz Peter Wirth), as Monsignore Berghammer

=== Director ===
Film

- 1937: Die Fledermaus
- 1938: The Day After the Divorce
- 1938: Unsere kleine Frau (German-language version)
  - 1938: Mia moglie SK diverte (Italian-language version)
- 1939: Salonwagen E 417
- 1939: Renate in the Quartet
- 1939: Gold in New Frisco
- 1940: Aus erster Ehe
- 1942: The Night in Venice
- 1942: The Rainer Case
- 1942: Der große Schatten
- 1943: Ein glücklicher Mensch
- 1944: Das Konzert
- 1944: Philharmonic
- 1948: The Court Concert
- 1949: Du bist nicht allein
- 1950: This Man Belongs to Me
- 1950: Heart of Stone
- 1951: Eva im Frack
- 1951: The Guilt of Doctor Homma
- 1951: A Heidelberg Romance
- 1952: A Very Big Child
- 1952: That Can Happen to Anyone
- 1953: Praterherzen
- 1953: Don't Forget Love
- 1953: Wedding in Transit
- 1954: A Woman of Today
- 1954: Hoheit lassen bitten
- 1954: The Eternal Waltz
- 1955: I Know What I'm Living For
- 1955: Roman einer Siebzehnjährigen
- 1956: The Golden Bridge
- 1956: Like Once Lili Marleen
- 1957: Jede Nacht in einem anderen Bett
- 1957: Von allen geliebt
- 1960: The Juvenile Judge
- 1962: Her Most Beautiful Day
- 1977: "Soldier Of Orange" based on a memoir by Erik Hazelhoff

Television

- 1957: Die Abenteuer des braven Soldaten Schwejk — (based on The Good Soldier Švejk by Jaroslav Hašek)
- 1957: Der geheimnisvolle Dr. Mander — (based on a radio play by Michael Brett)
- 1957: Die Fee — (based on The Good Fairy by Ferenc Molnár)
- 1958: Die letzte Station — (based on a play by Erich Maria Remarque)
- 1958: Die selige Edwina Black — (based on the play The Late Edwina Black by William Dinner and William Morum)
- 1958: Dr. med. Hiob Praetorius — (based on a play by Curt Goetz)
- 1959: Die Troerinnen des Euripides — (based on The Trojan Women)
- 1959: Nachtasyl — (based on the play The Lower Depths by Maxim Gorky)
- 1960: Der Fehltritt — (based on a play by Glen Bohannan and Andrew Solt)
- 1960: Die große Wut des Philipp Hotz — (based on a play by Max Frisch)
- 1960: Das Lied der Taube — (based on the play The Voice of the Turtle by John Van Druten)
- 1961: Froher Herbst des Lebens — (based on the play Alice Sit-by-the-Fire by J. M. Barrie)
- 1961: Die Sache mit dem Ring — (based on the play The Ring of Truth by Wynyard Browne)
- 1962: Seit Adam und Eva — (based on the play Ever Since Paradise by J. B. Priestley)
- 1962: Bedaure, falsch verbunden — (based on the radio play Sorry, Wrong Number by Lucille Fletcher)
- 1962: Peter Pan — (based on Peter Pan by J. M. Barrie)
- 1963: Mamselle Nitouche — (based on the operetta Mam'zelle Nitouche)
- 1963: Clothes Make the Man — (based on Clothes Make the Man by Gottfried Keller)
- 1963: Geliebt in Rom
- 1964: Frau Warrens Gewerbe — (based on Mrs. Warren's Profession by George Bernard Shaw)
- 1964: Zweierlei Maß — (based on Shakespeare's Measure for Measure)
- 1965: Vor Nachbarn wird gewarnt — (based on the play Meet a Body by Frank Launder and Sidney Gilliat)
- 1966: Der Fall Jeanne d'Arc
- 1966: Der Fall Mata Hari
- 1967: Liebe für Liebe (co-director: Hans Schweikart) — (based on Love for Love by William Congreve)
- 1967: Der Panamaskandal
- 1967: Gottes zweite Garnitur — (based on a novel by Willi Heinrich)
- 1971: The Hitler/Ludendorff Trial: Scenes From a High Treason Trial in a Republic Without Republicans
- 1972: Verdacht gegen Barry Croft — (based on a play by Scott Forbes)

=== Screenwriter ===
- 1936: The Court Concert (dir. Douglas Sirk)

== Documentary film ==
- Die Verhoevens, 2003 (documentary film by Felix Moeller, Germany; 75 minutes)
