= Das kleine Hofkonzert =

German musical comedy

- musical comedy by Edmund Nick
- Translation: The Little Court Concert
- Librettist: Paul Verhoeven; Toni Impekoven
- Language: German
- Premiere: 19 November 1935; Munich Kammerspiele

Das kleine Hofkonzert (The Little Court Concert) is a musical comedy in three acts (ten scenes) "from the world of Carl Spitzweg", music by Edmund Nick, libretto by Paul Verhoeven and Toni Impekoven. It premiered on 19 November 1935 at the Munich Kammerspiele.

Nick also wrote a "Fantasy" based on material from this work.

== Roles ==
- Christine Holm, a singer
- His Serene Highness
- Earl Marshal von Arnegg (or Arneck)
- Lieutenant Walter von Arnegg, his son (tenor)
- Oberst von Flumms
- Mrs von Flumms
- Mr Zunder, a travelling salesman
- Court physician
- Librarian Möhrchen
- Court Kapellmeister
- Police Minister
- Majordomo
- Knipp, a poor poet
- His landlady
- Apothecary
- Mona, his wife
- Hanne, their daughter, in love with Jakob (soubrette)
- Jakob, apprentice apothecary, in love with Hanne (buffo)
- Mayor
- Guards
- Innkeeper of "The Silver Moon"
- Court officials, Lackeys, maidens, a Widower, soldiers, citizens, musicians, ladies and gentlemen of the court

== Plot ==
In "a small German ducal principality, about 1840", the singer Christine Holm has been invited by His Serene Highness to the small town of Immendingen to give a "little court concert". On that occasion, she also intends to make inquiries who her father might be. Her only clue is the song "When the evening's dark veil..." ("Wenn des Abends dunkler Schleier...") which her mother sang 25 years ago for this man.

Walter, son of Earl Marshal von Arnegg, has immediately fallen in love with Christine. When nasty rumours about Christine begin to circulate in the small town, Walter supports Christine and is even prepared to leave the town with her. His Serene Highness, learning that his concert has to be cancelled because Christine has been driven out of town, recalls her. She gets introduced to the sovereign, who is impressed by her charm and promises to help with the search for her father.

She also mentions her mother's song, and the old man remembers his affair with a handsome singer 25 years ago. He decides to treat Christine from now on as his own daughter and make her a noblewoman. Even the poor poet Knipp gets a knighthood because his poetry has brought so many couples together. Now there are no more barriers to the marriage of Christine and Walter, nor to the "little court concert".

== Notable arias ==
- "Wunderschön ist es, verliebt zu sein" (Walter von Arnegg and Christine Holm)
- "Ach, wenn der König nur wüsst" (Christine Holm)
- "Ein armer Schäfer verehrte die hohe Königin" (Court Kapellmeister)
- "Die Spröde: An dem reinsten Frühlingsmorgen" (Christine Holm)
- "Nun faltet der Tag seine Flügel" (Christine Holm)
- "Denkst du nie daran?" (Christine Holm)
- "Wenn des Abends dunkler Schleier" (Christine Holm)

== Films ==
- The Court Concert (1936), directed by Douglas Sirk (as Detlef Sierck), starring Marta Eggerth and Johannes Heesters
- The Court Concert (1948/1949), directed by Paul Verhoeven, starring Elfie Mayerhofer and Hans Nielsen
- Das kleine Hofkonzert (1963 television film), directed by John Olden
- Das kleine Hofkonzert (1976 television film), directed by Wolfgang Liebeneiner
