= Hans Heinrich =

Hans Heinrich may refer to:

- Hans Reimann (writer) (1889–1969), pseudonym Hans Heinrich, German writer
- Hans Heinrich (director) (1911–2003), German film director
- Hans Heinrich XV (1861–1938), Silesian nobleman
