= The Tiger Akbar =

1951 film directed by Harry Piel

- Directed by: Harry Piel
- Written by: William Quindt (novel); Harry Piel
- Produced by: Harry Piel
- Starring: Harry Piel; Friedl Hardt; Hilde Hildebrand; Nicolas Koline
- Cinematography: Bruno Timm; Klaus von Rautenfeld
- Edited by: Hilde Grebner
- Music by: Fritz Wenneis
- Production company: Ariel Film
- Distributed by: Deutsche Cosmopol Film
- Release date: 20 August 1951
- Running time: 122 minutes
- Country: West Germany
- Language: German

The Tiger Akbar (German: Der Tiger Akbar) is a 1951 West German thriller film directed by Harry Piel and starring Piel, Friedl Hardt, Hilde Hildebrand and Nicolas Koline. It was shot at the Wiesbaden Studios in Hesse and on location at the Willamsbau circus in Cologne. The film's sets were designed by the art directors [arl Vollbrecht and Alfred Bütow. It is in the tradition of Circus films.

== Cast ==
- Harry Piel as Jonny Wilken, Dompteur
- Friedl Hardt as Jutta Sarris, die 'Tigerbraut'
- Hilde Hildebrand as Madame Regina, Kunstreiterin
- Nicolas Koline as Nicky
- Helga Wiedenbrüg as Maria Roland, Journalistin
- Fritz Lafontaine as Gaston Costil
- Albert Gallin-Krauss as Tierpfleger
- Leopold von Ledebur as Williams, Zirkusdirektor
- Conny Heim
- Georg Hilbert
- Willy Millowitsch
- Franz Schneider
- Friedrich Schütze
- Kurt Bruck Jr.
- Alfons Goldar

== Bibliography ==
- Goble, Alan. The Complete Index to Literary Sources in Film. Walter de Gruyter, 1999.
