= Split custody =

Child custody arrangement

Split custody refers to a child custody arrangement in which one parent has sole custody of one or more children while the other parent has sole custody of the remaining siblings. Split custody is rare, as it is thought that it is in the best to keep siblings together for mutual comfort, stability and support. Reasons for split custody can be child preferences for different parents or siblings that do not get along with each other. It is more common for older compared to younger siblings, and then usually at the request of one of the children.

Split custody is different from shared parenting, where all children live approximately equal time with each parent in a joint arrangement.

== Criticism ==
One criticism of split custody is the same as for sole custody, in that the children only have one primary parent, which has been shown to cause worse physical, mental and social outcomes versus shared parenting. Split custody has also been criticized for separating siblings and limiting the amount of comfort, support and stability that they can give to each other.

== See also ==
- Alternating custody
- Child custody
- Divorce
- The Parent Trap
- Parenting plan
- Shared parenting
- Sole custody
- Third-party custody
