= Heinz Sandauer =

Austrian composer

- Born: 9 January 1911; Vienna, Austro-Hungarian Empire
- Died: 5 August 1979 (aged 68); Vienna, Austria
- Occupation: Composer

Heinz Sandauer (1911–1979) was an Austrian composer. Sandauer worked on the film scores of twenty films between 1936 and 1958.

== Selected filmography ==
- Harvest (1936)
- The Missing Wife (1937)
- Anton the Last (1939)
- Two Happy People (1943)
- The Imaginary Invalid (1952)
- Shame on You, Brigitte! (1952)
- Arena of Death (1953)
- The Schimeck Family (1957)
- The Unexcused Hour (1957)
- Sebastian Kneipp (1958)

== Bibliography ==
- Musiker, Naomi & Musiker, Reuben. Conductors and Composers of Popular Orchestral Music: A Biographical and Discographical Sourcebook. Routledge, 2014.
