= Treasure Island (1966 miniseries) =

1966 television film directed by Wolfgang Liebeneiner

- Also known as: L'Île au trésor
- Die Schatzinsel
- Based on: Treasure Island by Robert Louis Stevenson
- Screenplay by: Walter Ulbrich
- Directed by: Wolfgang Liebeneiner
- Starring: Michael Ande; Jacques Dacqmine; Georges Riquier
- Music by: Jan Hanuš
- Composers: Jan Hanuš; Luboš Sluka
- Countries of origin: Germany; France
- Original languages: German; French
- No. of episodes: 4 at 90 Min (Germany); 13 at 30 Min (France) (complete length 360 minutes)

Production
- Producers: Henry Deutschmeister; Walter Ulbrich
- Cinematography: Roger Fellous; Guy Suzuki
- Camera setup: Guy Suzuki; Roger Fellous
- Running time: 105 minutes

Original release
- Release: 25 December 1966 – 1 January 1967

Treasure Island, original title Die Schatzinsel, is a German-French mini-series, produced for German television station ZDF in 1966 and in color. The screenplay by Walter Ulbrich, who also co-produced the film, remains largely close to Robert Louis Stevenson's classic 1883 novel Treasure Island.

== Plot ==
- The first part Der alte Freibeuter ("The Old Pirate", about 80 minutes) tells the relationship between Jim and Billy Bones, as well as the dangerous adventures with the pirates at the Hawkins Inn. It ends with Squire Trelawney chartering a boat in Bristol.
- The second part Der Schiffskoch ("The Ship's cook", about 88 minutes) introduces Long John Silver and the other pirates, as well as the preparations for the journey. At sea, Jim overhears at night that Silver is a pirate and informs the non-pirate crew members.
- The third part Das Blockhaus ("The Block House", about 91 minutes) tells the start of the fight on Treasure Island and the non-pirates hiding in the wooden house, as well as introducing Ben Gunn.
- The fourth part Die Entscheidung ("The Decision", about 84 minutes) shows Jim Hawkins entering the Hispaniola and his fight with Israel Hands, as well as the outcome which is close to the book.

== Cast ==
- Michael Ande as Jim Hawkins
- Ivor Dean as Long John Silver
- Georges Riquier as Dr. David Livesey
- Jacques Dacqmine as Squire John Trelawney
- Jacques Monod as Captain Alexander Smollet
- Dante Maggio as Billy Bones
- Jean Mauvais as Blinder Pew / James Brandon
- Sylvain Lévignac as Black Dog
- Jacques Godin as Israel Hands
- Dominique Maurin as Tom Purcell
- Jean Saudray as Ben Gunn
- Ilsemarie Schnering as Jim Hawkins' mother
- François Darbon as Marc Hawkins, Jim's father
- Hellmut Lange as the narrator

== Background ==
After successful adaptions of Robinson Crusoe and Don Quijote, Treasure Island was the third in a row of sixteen television adventures mini-series by ZDF between 1964 and 1983. It was filmed at locations in Brittany, at Corsica and at Lake Garda (Italy), with an international cast and crew. Michael Ande, who portrayed Jim, suffered a serious accident during filming and had to be doubled in some scenes. It was produced on 35 mm film with many small details and even in colour, although colour television was introduced on German television only in 1967 (so the first screening had to be in black and white).

After the success of the mini-series, Ivor Dean (who portrayed John Silver) worked on a follow-up film with producer Robert S. Baker, but it never materialised before Dean's death in 1974. Baker continued to develop the project and it was finally made as the 10 part serial Return to Treasure Island in 1986.

== Reception ==
The mini-series remains well-regarded and popular in the German-language area, it is even considered a "mythos of German television history". Despite being over 50 years old, it is still screened at least about once a year on television. It is little-known in other countries.
