= Fußballtrainer Wulff =

Television series

- Starring: Horst Niendorf: coach Harry Wulff; Renate Redetzky: his wife Marlene Wulff; Katharina Seyferth: daughter Gisela Wulff; Nicky Macoulis: son Martin Wulff; Kurt Schmidtchen: assistant coach und massager Shorty Timmermann; Michael Ande: Heinz Kudrowski; and others
- Country of origin: Germany
- No. of seasons: 2
- No. of episodes: 26

Production
- Running time: 25 minutes
- Production company: Saarländischer Rundfunk

Original release
- Network: ARD
- Release: 27 October 1972 – April 1973

Fußballtrainer Wulff is a German television series.

== List of episodes ==
1. Irrtum, Herr Professor
2. Brot oder Spiele
3. Reserve hat Wut
4. Aus bester Familie
5. Hinter dem Totengrund
6. 45 Pferde
7. Zum Fischen nach Split
8. Komm, komm Casanova
9. Das Kuckucksei
10. Totes Kapital
11. Shortys schnelle Pulle
12. Wach auf, Kapitän!
13. Der Sündenbock
14. Ruheloser Ruhestand
15. Zwiebeln aus Holland
16. Ein Schloß in Bayern
17. Mit Zitronen gehandelt
18. 1:0 für Eva
19. Eisenmax muß weichen
20. Was kannst du?
21. Erbschaft mit zwei Beinen
22. Bestechung
23. Auf nach Avignon
24. Verhexte Mittsommernacht
25. Schwedische Gardinen
26. Die Axt im Walde
