= Joseph Egger =

Austrian actor (1889–1966)

- Born: 22 February 1889; Donawitz, Styria, Austria-Hungary
- Died: 29 August 1966 (aged 77); Gablitz, Lower Austria
- Occupation: Actor
- Years active: 1907–1966

Joseph Egger (22 February 1889 – 29 August 1966; also spelled Josef Egger) was an Austrian character actor who appeared in 76 films between 1935 and 1965.

== Biography ==
The 18-year-old Egger started his stage career at the Leoben theatre. During the following decades, he also appeared at the Raimund Theater in Vienna and at the Deutsches Theater in Munich. Besides acting Egger was a well-known music hall comedian, and he was famous for doing "tricks" with his beard.

He received his first film offers during the 1930s and specialized on portraying eccentric old men in supporting roles. During the 1950s, he appeared in comedic roles in numerous Austrian Heimatfilms of that era.

Internationally, Egger appeared as a character actor in the first two films of the Sergio Leone western "Dollars Trilogy": As the coffin-builder in A Fistful of Dollars (1964) and as Prophet in his final film appearance For a Few Dollars More (1965).

== Personal life ==
Joseph Egger was married to Erna and had three sons. He worked as an actor until his death in 1966 at the age of 77.

== Selected filmography ==
- Im weißen Rößl (1935)
- Der König lächelt – Paris lacht (1936)
- Mädchenpensionat (1936)
- Das jüngste Gericht (1940)
- Love is Duty Free (1941)
- Reisebekanntschaft (1943) – Postbote
- Black on White (1943) – Man on Public Park Bench Calling for His Dog (uncredited)
- Schrammeln (1944) – Pfändungsbeamter
- Die goldene Fessel (1944)
- Music in Salzburg (1944) – Parkwächter
- Die Fledermaus (1946) – Frosch The Jailer
- Der Hofrat Geiger (1947) – Der alte Windischgruber
- Der Herr Kanzleirat (1948) – Briefträger
- Die Verjüngungskur (1948) – Vinzenz, Vater von Hinterhuber
- Der Seelenbräu (1950)
- Child of the Danube (1950) – Christoph
- No Sin on the Alpine Pastures (1950) – Der Großvater
- Wedding Night In Paradise (1950) – Biangetti, Portier
- Gruß und Kuß aus der Wachau (1950) – Adalbert Kürenberg
- Wedding in the Hay (1951) – Ferdinand Hauderer
- Spring on Ice (1951) – Ober im Weinlokal
- Der Fünfminutenvater (1951) – Gendarm
- Verklungenes Wien (1951)
- Das Herz einer Frau (1951)
- Eva erbt das Paradies... ein Abenteuer im Salzkammergut (1951) – Alois Wegrichter
- Dance Into Happiness (1951) – Heinz Falkenhayn
- The Fall of Valentin (1951) – Blasius Rogner
- In München steht ein Hofbräuhaus (1951) – Petiti
- The Mine Foreman (1952) – Praxmarer, Obersteiger aus Hallstatt
- The Landlady of Maria Wörth (1952) – Briefträger Seppl
- Starfish (1952)
- Dark Clouds Over the Dachstein (1953)
- The Singing Hotel (1953) – Wurmser, Hotelportier
- A Night in Venice (1953) – Barbuccio
- Die Perle von Tokay (1954) – Janek, Offiziersdiener
- Consul Strotthoff (1954)
- Columbus Discovers Kraehwinkel (1954)
- Swelling Melodies (1955) – Gefängniswärter Frosch
- The Inn on the Lahn (1955) – Zimperl
- Royal Hunt in Ischl (1955)
- Das Erbe vom Pruggerhof (1956) – Kerstl, Pruggers Kutscher
- Bademeister Spargel (1956) – Ypsilon
- Die gestohlene Hose (1956)
- Love, Summer and Music (1956)
- Die Fischerin vom Bodensee (1956) – Großvater Grassl
- Liebe, Sommer und Musik (1956) – Alois Rinnerthaler, der großvater
- Where the Lark Sings (1956) – Stieglbauer
- Sissi – The Young Empress (1956) – Ceremony Master Nepalek
- The Old Forester House (1956) – Josef Kramer
- Vater macht Karriere (1957) – Älterer Saaldiener
- Hoch droben auf dem Berg (1957) – Joseph Hinteregger
- Der Bauerndoktor von Bayrischzell (1957) – (uncredited)
- Siebenmal in der Woche (1957) – Praxl
- Weißer Holunder (1957) – Draxltoni
- Der schönste Tag meines Lebens (1957) – Blümel
- Heimweh … dort, wo die Blumen blühn (1957) – Josef
- Almenrausch and Edelweiss (1957) – Förster Fenninger
- Hoch klingt der Radetzkymarsch (1958) – Franz Lechner, Franzis Großvater
- When She Starts, Look Out (1958) – Onkel Tobias
- Christine (1958) – (uncredited)
- Mikosch of the Secret Service (1959) – Oberst Wedel – Geheimdienst-Chef
- Sooo nicht, meine Herren! (1960) – Friedensrichter
- Hohe Tannen (1960)
- The White Horse Inn (1960) – (uncredited)
- … und du mein Schatz bleibst hier (1961)
- Im schwarzen Rößl (1961) – Franz Joseph, Portier
- Forever My Love (1962) – (uncredited)
- Dance with Me Into the Morning (1962) – Kapitän Zebel
- Die lustigen Vagabunden (1962) – Tankwart Fuchsteufel
- The Model Boy (1963) – Dienstmann
- Die ganze Welt ist himmelblau (1964) – Gutschober
- A Fistful of Dollars (1964) – Piripero
- Massacre at Marble City (1964) – Fishbury
- Liebesgrüße aus Tirol (1964) – Onkel Sebastian Holl
- Ein Ferienbett mit 100 PS (1965) – Zulassungsbeamter
- Black Eagle of Santa Fe (1965) – Buddy
- For a Few Dollars More (1965) – Old Prophet (final film role)
