= The Scoundrel (1931 film) =

1931 film

- French poster
- Directed by: Eugen Schüfftan; Franz Wenzler
- Written by: Hans Reimann (play) Toni Impekoven (play); Emeric Pressburger; Erich Kästner
- Produced by: Bruno Duday
- Starring: Max Adalbert; Emilia Unda; Evelyn Holt; Heinz Wagner
- Cinematography: Bernhard Wentzel; Eugen Schüfftan
- Music by: Herbert Lichtenstein
- Production company: UFA
- Distributed by: UFA
- Release date: 5 June 1931
- Running time: 82 minutes
- Country: Germany
- Language: German

The Scoundrel (German: Das Ekel) is a 1931 German comedy film directed by Eugen Schüfftan and Franz Wenzler and starring Max Adalbert, Emilia Unda, and Evelyn Holt. It is based on the play The Scoundrel by Hans Reimann and Toni Impekoven. It was shot at the Babelsberg Studios in Berlin with sets designed by the art directors Hans Sohnle and Otto Erdmann. The film was remade in 1939 and 1959.

== Cast ==
- Max Adalbert as Aldalbert Bulcke
- Emilia Unda as Hermine, his wife
- Evelyn Holt as Katherina, their daughter
- Heinz Wagner as Egmont, their son
- Heinz Könecke as Quitt
- Viktor Franz as Scheelhase
- Rosa Valetti as Frau Kochanke
- Ernst Pröckl as Werndorff
- Hans Hermann Schaufuß as Schutzmann Lemke
- Alfred Abel as Guide
- Paul Henckels as Law Officer
- Julius E. Herrmann as Weichert
- Martha Ziegler as Frau Weichert
- Rudolf Biebrach as Prison Warder
- Erik Schütz

== Bibliography ==
- Bock, Hans-Michael; Bergfelder, Tim, eds. (2009). The Concise Cinegraph: Encyclopaedia of German Cinema. New York: Berghahn Books. ISBN 978-1-57181-655-9.
