= Drei Mann auf einem Pferd =

1957 film

- Directed by: Kurt Meisel
- Written by: George Abbott (play Three Men on a Horse); John Cecil Holm (play Three Men on a Horse); Gustav Kampendonk
- Produced by: Kurt Ulrich (producer)
- Starring: See below
- Cinematography: Kurt Hasse
- Edited by: Wolfgang Wehrum
- Music by: Michael Jary
- Release date: 1957
- Running time: 90 minutes
- Country: West Germany
- Language: German

Drei Mann auf einem Pferd is a 1957 West German film directed by Kurt Meisel.

== Plot summary ==
A man has discovered a fail-proof way of betting on the winning horse in any race. There is only one catch: He must never be the person to place the bet.

== Cast ==
- Nadja Tiller as Kitty
- Walter Giller as Erwin Tucke
- Gardy Granass as Ulla, the wife
- Theo Lingen as Mäcki
- Kurt Meisel as Freddy
- Walter Gross as Felix
- Walter Müller as Clemens Holm
- Harry Tagore as Harry
- Carla Hagen as Fräulein Schnack, the Secretary
- Willy Millowitsch as Direktor Körber
- Friedl Hardt as Bardame

== See also ==
- Three Men on a Horse (1936)
- List of films about horses
- List of films about horse racing
