= Sarah Weinman =

American journalist and crime fiction author

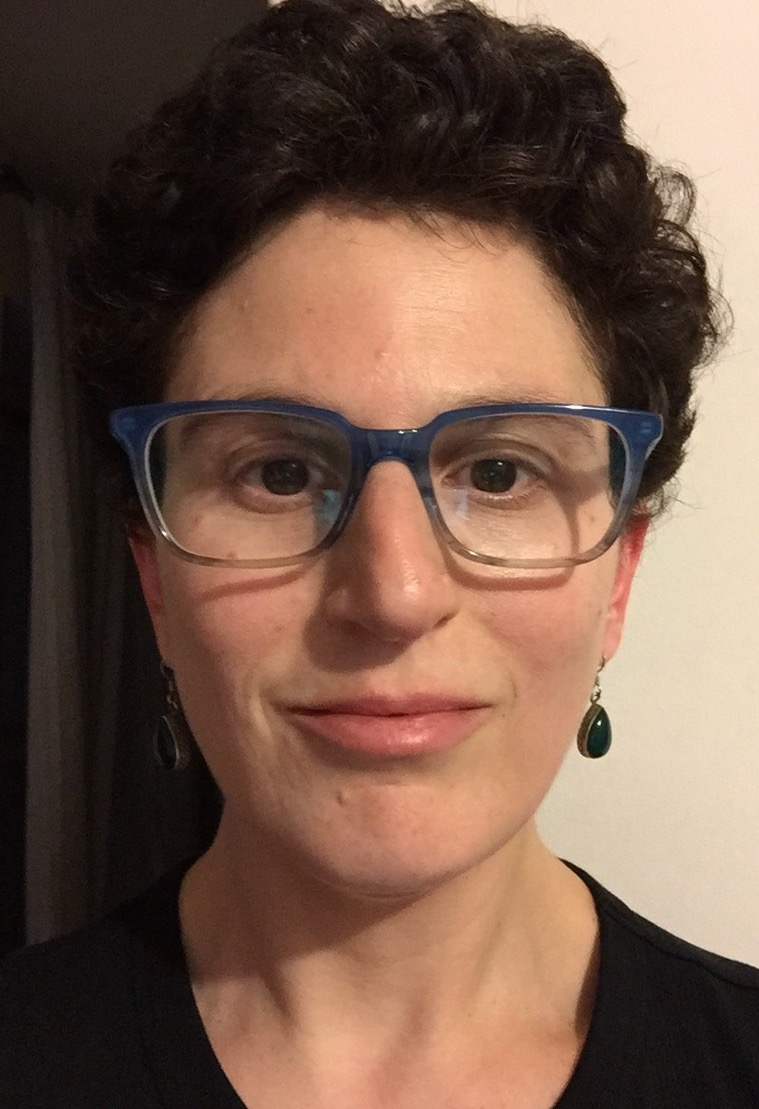
- Weinman in 2018
- Occupations: News editor, Publishers Marketplace
- Writing career
- Notable works: Women Crime Writers; Troubled Daughters; Twisted Wives

Sarah Weinman is a Canadian journalist, editor, and crime fiction authority. She has most recently written The Real Lolita: The Kidnapping of Sally Horner and the Novel That Scandalized the World about the kidnapping and captivity of 11-year-old Florence Sally Horner by a serial child molester, a crime believed to have inspired Vladimir Nabokov's Lolita. The book received reviews from NPR, The Los Angeles Times, The Washington Post, and The Boston Globe.

== Early life and education ==
Weinman is a native of Ottawa, Ontario, Canada, where she graduated from Nepean High School. She later graduated from McGill University and the John Jay College of Criminal Justice.

== Professional career ==
Weinman edited the compendium Women Crime Writers which republishes crime fiction by women written in the 1940s and 1950s. Weinman also edited the anthology Troubled Daughters, Twisted Wives, called "simply one of the most significant anthologies of crime fiction, ever." by the Los Angeles Review of Books. Her essays have been featured in Slate, The New York Times, Hazlitt Magazine and The New Republic. Weinman has published a weekly newsletter about crime fiction called The Crime Lady since January 2015.

== Works ==
=== Non-fiction ===
- —— (2018). The Real Lolita: The Kidnapping of Sally Horner and the Novel that Scandalized the World. Ecco (US). ISBN 9780062661920.
- —— (2022). Scoundrel: How a Convicted Murderer Persuaded the Women Who Loved Him, the Conservative Establishment, and the Courts to Set Him Free. Ecco (US). ISBN 9780062899767.
- —— (2025). Without Consent: A Landmark Trial and the Decades-Long Struggle to Make Spousal Rape a Crime. Ecco (US). ISBN 9780063279889.

=== Collections ===
- —— (2013). Troubled Daughters, Twisted Wives. Penguin Books. p. 356. ISBN 9780143122548.
- —— (2015). Women Crime Writers (Hardcover) Eight Suspense Novels of the 1940s & 50s: A Library of America Boxed Set. Library of America. p. 1512. ISBN 9781598534511.

=== Essays ===
- —— (2012). "The Mysterious Disappearance of Peter Winston". Observer.
- —— (2014). "The Murderer and the Manuscript". New York Times Magazine.
- —— (2014). "The Real Lolita". Hazlitt Magazine. Penguin Random House.
- ——. "The Case of the Disappearing Black Detective Novel". The New Republic.
- —— (2016). "Massacre at Ninth and Main". Buzzfeed.
- —— (2017). "The True Crime Story Behind a 1970 Cult Feminist Film Classic". Topic. First Look Media.
