= The Domestic Tyrant =

1959 film

- Directed by: Hans Deppe
- Written by: Werner P. Zibaso
- Based on: The Scoundrel by Hans Reimann and Toni Impekoven
- Produced by: Walter Traut
- Starring: Heinz Erhardt; Grethe Weiser; Peter Vogel
- Cinematography: Oskar Schnirch
- Edited by: Werner Preuss
- Music by: Raimund Rosenberger
- Production company: Divina-Film
- Distributed by: Gloria Film
- Release date: 29 January 1959
- Running time: 90 minutes
- Country: West Germany
- Language: German

The Domestic Tyrant (German: Der Haus-Tyrann) is a 1959 West German comedy film directed by Hans Deppe and starring Heinz Erhardt, Grethe Weiser and Peter Vogel. It is based on the play The Scoundrel by Hans Reimann and Toni Impekoven, which has been made into several films.

The film's sets were designed by the art directors Werner Achmann and Willy Schatz.

== Synopsis ==
An overbearing owner of a coffee shop torments his family and customers, until he finds himself in court.

== Cast ==
- Heinz Erhardt as Paul Perlacher
- Grethe Weiser as Amalie Hartung
- Peter Vogel as Hannes Hartung
- Helga Martin as Inge Perlacher
- Rudolf Platte as waiter Gottlieb
- Stephan Schwartz as Alex Perlacher
- Arnulf Schröder as professor
- Ernst Waldow as examining magistrate Dr. Wallner
- Beppo Brem as constable Rübsam
- Eduard Linkers as prosecutor
- Hans Leibelt as judge
- Else Quecke as Trude Perlacher
- Dietrich Thoms as postman
- Willy Hagara as himself

== Soundtrack ==
- Willy Hagara — "Es kann im Frühling sein" (Music by Josef Niessen, lyrics by Bruno Balz)
- Willy Hagara — "Man liebt nur einmal" (Music by Josef Niessen, lyrics by Bruno Balz)

== Bibliography ==
- Hans-Michael Bock and Tim Bergfelder. The Concise Cinegraph: An Encyclopedia of German Cinema. Berghahn Books, 2009.
