= Lisa and Lottie =

1949 German children's novel by Erich Kästner

- One of earliest German editions, c. 1949
- Author: Erich Kästner
- Original title: Das doppelte Lottchen
- Translator: Cyrus Brooks (United States and Canada since 1962) Anthea Bell (United Kingdom and Australia since 2014)
- Illustrator: Walter Trier
- Genre: Children's novel
- Publication date: 1949
- Publication place: Germany
- English publication date: c.1962 as Lottie and Lisa c.1969 as Lisa and Lottie c.2014 as The Parent Trap

Lisa and Lottie, published in the United Kingdom and Australia as The Parent Trap, (original German title: Das doppelte Lottchen, lit.: "The Double Lottie") is a 1949 German children's novel by Erich Kästner. The book is about identical twin girls whose parents separated them in infancy upon divorcing, only to reunite at a summer camp years later before switching places.

The book originates from a film scenario Kästner developed during World War II that was never produced. In 1942, when he was briefly allowed by the Nazi authorities to work as a screenwriter, he proposed the plot to Josef von Báky, under the title The Great Secret, but the Nazis once again forbade him to work. After the war, Kästner wrote his idea into the book Das doppelte Lottchen, which was illustrated by Walter Trier.

A successful novel, Das doppelte Lottchen has been adapted for the screen multiple times, most notably Disney's 1961 American film The Parent Trap starring Hayley Mills, its sequels and 1998 remake starring Lindsay Lohan, and other localized versions.

In 1962, Cyrus Brooks translated Das doppelte Lottchen into English as Lottie and Lisa (later as Lisa and Lottie), an edition still published in the United States and Canada.

In 2014, the book was faithfully retranslated into English by Anthea Bell, featuring Walter Trier's illustrations and republished in the United Kingdom and Australia by Pushkin Press as The Parent Trap, after Disney's adaptation. In 2020, Australian actress Ruby Rees recorded an unabridged narration of Bell's translation for Bolinda.

== Plot summary ==
Chapter One

At a German all-girls' summer camp at Seebühl on Lake Bühl (Bohrlaken on Lake Bohren in Cyrus Brooks' translation and Seebühl am Bühlsee in the German original), two nine-and-a-half-year-old girls named Luise Palfy (Lisa Palfy in Brooks' translation) and Lottie Körner (Lottie Horn in Brooks' translation) are surprised to see how identical they look. Despite looking alike, Luise has her hair curled in ringlets and is rude, while Lottie has her own hair styled in two braids and is shy. Summer camp head Mrs Muthesius and camp assistants Miss Ulrike and Miss Gerda also marvel at the two girls' uncanny resemblance, considering the facts that Luise lives in Vienna, Lottie lives in Munich, and they have never met before. At suppertime, the camp staff arranges for Luise and Lottie to sit together at the same table and to sleep in the same room. After kicking Lottie in the shin during supper, Luise has a change of heart and strokes Lottie's hair before sleeping beside her.

Chapter Two

Luise and Lottie begin getting to know one another and become good friends. At lunchtime, the two girls both show up in braids and have everyone guessing who is who. Luise and Lottie are then allowed to go into the village, where local photographer Mr Josef Eipeldauer takes pictures of them to send home. Upon learning they were both born on October 14 and in Linz, Luise and Lottie realise they are identical twin sisters, a fact that Miss Ulrike has also discovered while checking on the girls' personal information; yet Mrs Muthesius forbids her assistant from revealing the truth, correctly suspecting that the sisters already know it. When the sisters return to camp, Lottie gives Luise a photograph of their mother.

Chapter Three

Instead of sending the pictures home, Luise and Lottie tear them up and dump the pieces into the lake. The sisters deduce that they had lived together until they were two years old, when their parents divorced and split them up just as their mother, Luiselotte, divided her own first name to give her daughters theirs. Luise has even asked her father to send her a photograph of himself, which she then gives to Lottie.

Chapter Four

For the past weeks, Luise and Lottie have been exchanging notes on how to impersonate one another, as they secretly plan to switch places and each spend time with the parents they have never known before. When the time comes for the campers to go home, Luise (as Lottie) braids her hair and takes the train to Munich and Lottie (as Luise) curls her own hair and takes the train to Vienna.

Chapter Five

Luise is now living in Munich with her mother, Luiselotte Körner (Lisalotte Horn in Brooks' translation), an editor for the Munich Illustrated weekly newspaper.

Lottie is now living in an apartment in Vienna with her father, Ludwig Palfy (Arnold Palfy in Brooks' translation), a Music Director at the Opera House, and his housekeeper, Resi. While Lottie and her father are having supper at a hotel, paediatrician Dr. Strobl shows up with his dog, Peperl, who sniffs at the girl and knows she is not Luise. At home, Resi is surprised by "Luise's" sudden interest in housework.

It is revealed that whenever Ludwig holds a concert in Munich, Luiselotte secretly buys a ticket and watches him perform, aware that he is unhappy despite his successful career.

Chapter Six

In Munich, Luise messes up while trying to cook like her sister, but her mother happily helps her "little housewife", her nickname for the real Lottie, who always keeps house whenever Luiselotte works overtime.

In Vienna, Lottie watches her father conduct a performance of Engelbert Humperdinck's Hansel and Gretel. Sitting next to Lottie is a woman named Irene Gerlach, whom she suspects is her father's new girlfriend. That night, Lottie dreams that Miss Gerlach is an evil witch who divides the family of four.

Chapter Seven

When school resumes, "Luise" surprises her teachers and classmates by becoming a model student. By then, Peperl has accepted Lottie as a friend as she resumes impersonating her sister and does many of Resi's chores for her. Meanwhile, Ludwig, who has been giving Lottie piano lessons, tells Irene of his plan to write his own children's opera.

In Munich, "Lottie" surprises everyone by repeatedly slapping Anni Habersetzer to punish her for bullying a classmate named Ilse Merck. When Lottie's teacher, Miss Linnekogel, informs Luiselotte of her daughter's sudden change in behaviour, Luiselotte blames herself, thinking that "Lottie" has changed due to the stress of doing housework. So one weekend, Luiselotte takes Luise on a short holiday in Garmisch in the Alps, an experience mother and daughter enjoy together.

Chapter Eight

In Vienna, Lottie befriends her apartment neighbour, an artist named Anton Gabele, who draws her. One day, Ludwig tells Lottie that he and Irene are getting married. Shocked by the news, Lottie individually begs her father and Irene to call off their engagement, but both adults refuse, with the latter intending to send "Luise" to a boarding school once the wedding is over. Overwhelmed, Lottie becomes seriously ill, to the concern of Dr Strobl and Ludwig.

Chapter Nine

In Munich, Dr Bernau, the editor-in-chief of the Munich Illustrated, shows Luiselotte the photos Mr Eipeldauer had taken of her daughters. Despite the twins destroying their own copies, Mr Eipeldauer had actually printed more to send to Dr Bernau out of amazement at the girls' uncanny resemblance. Shocked by the pictures, Luiselotte leaves work to go to Miss Linnekogel, whom she tells of the split custody arrangement and of her suspicions that the twin living with her is actually Luise. Miss Linnekogel responds by telling Luiselotte that what matters most is the twins' happiness. Since switching places, the twins themselves have been secretly corresponding with each other; Luise, who is now aware of her father's relationship with Irene, becomes concerned because Lottie has suddenly stopped sending her letters. When Luiselotte comes home, she calls Luise by her real name, prompting the girl to confess everything to her mother.

Chapter Ten

Luiselotte and Luise call Ludwig on the telephone, telling him of the switch. Upon learning of Lottie's illness, Luise and their mother board an aeroplane to Vienna. Even with the truth revealed and the twins reswitched, Luiselotte and Lottie decide to stay with Ludwig and Luise for the time being. When Ludwig later informs Irene of the events that have transpired the past few months, she angrily leaves him, thinking Luiselotte is trying to get Ludwig back. Despite losing Irene, Ludwig finds in his daughters the inspiration to compose his own children's opera.

Chapter Eleven

Still together in Vienna, the two families celebrate the twins' tenth birthday. When their parents ask them what they want for their birthday, the twins wish for them all to be one family again. Pondering on this revelation, Ludwig and Luiselotte realise they still care for each other and fall in love again, to their daughters' delight.

Chapter Twelve

Ludwig and Luiselotte remarry, their second wedding officiated by one Mr Benno Grawunder and witnessed by Luise, Lottie, Mr Gabele, Dr Strobl, and Peperl. After the wedding, the Palfy family goes to Luise's school to enroll Lottie as herself. The amused headteacher, Mr Killian, says the sisters' actions have reminded him of the time he taught Sepp and Anton, identical twin brothers whose impoverished parents enrolled them as one boy, making them take turns going to school as such. As Luise's classmate Trude, who was present at the time the twins met at camp, tells the other students and their teachers the whole story, the Palfy family takes a taxi home, passing by Irene along the way. When Resi asks Luise and Lottie if they want a baby brother or sister now that their parents are remarried, they respond by wishing for both brothers and sisters, and that they also be pairs of twins.

== Characters ==
Luise Palfy and Lottie Körner
Luise Palfy and Lottie Körner (Lisa Palfy and Lottie Horn in Cyrus Brooks' translation) are identical twin sisters and the main protagonists of the novel. Born on October 14 in Linz, Luise and Lottie were named after their mother, Luiselotte. When the girls were two years old, their parents divorced and raised them in different cities: Luise was raised by their father, Ludwig Palfy, in Vienna while Lottie was raised by their mother, Luiselotte Körner, in Munich. Luise and Lottie then grew up becoming complete opposites: one is rude and mischievous and has her hair curled in ringlets; the other is shy and hardworking and has her hair styled in braids. Until their reunion at the girls' summer camp at Seebühl on Lake Bühl, Luise and Lottie did not know of each other's existence. Unlike their film counterparts, Luise and Lottie do not switch places to "trap" their parents into remarrying, but rather to spend time with them after being apart for six and a half years; when the twins reveal, on their tenth birthday, their wish to have one family again, their parents themselves fall in love and marry a second time. In the final chapter of the book, the reunited Palfy family now lives together in Vienna and the twins go to the same school.

Ludwig Palfy
Ludwig Palfy (Arnold Palfy in Cyrus Brooks' translation) is Luise and Lottie's father, a famous opera house conductor in Vienna. Amidst the concerts and operas he conducts, Ludwig loves his daughter, Luise, with whom he also enjoys having supper at the hotel and giving her (Lottie) piano lessons. Despite having a successful career, Ludwig is unhappy as noticed by his former wife and the twins' mother, Luiselotte, whenever she secretly watches him perform in Munich. After a short-lived engagement to Irene Gerlach, Ludwig sees in his daughters the inspiration to compose his own children's opera. When the twins reveal their trick and wish to have one family again, Luiselotte and Ludwig fall in love for a second time and remarry.

Luiselotte Körner
Luiselotte Körner (Lisalotte Horn in Brooks' Translation) is Luise and Lottie's mother, a newspaper editor in Munich. Although Luiselotte loves her daughter, she is often tired and stressed out from working overtime for the Munich Illustrated, prompting the girl to keep house. In addition, Luiselotte secretly buys tickets to watch her former husband and the twins' father, Ludwig Palfy, whenever he performs concerts in Munich. When the twins reveal their trick and wish to have one family again, Luiselotte and Ludwig fall in love for a second time and remarry; after the wedding, Luiselotte and Lottie move in to live with Ludwig and Luise, fulfilling the twins' wish.

Irene Gerlach
Irene Gerlach is a Viennese woman who dates and briefly becomes engaged to Ludwig Palfy. Unlike her film counterparts, Miss Gerlach is not a gold-digger, only accepting Ludwig's marriage proposal because of his status as an opera conductor and not his money; still, Irene does not get along well with Lottie (as Luise) and plans to send her to boarding school after the wedding. When the twins' trick is revealed, however, Irene angrily breaks up with Ludwig, thinking Luiselotte is trying to get him back. In the final chapter of the book, Irene Gerlach watches the remarried Ludwig and Luiselotte, accompanied by their daughters, drive past her.

Other characters

- Mrs Muthesius, head of the summer camp where Luise and Lottie reunite before switching places.
- Miss Ulrike and Miss Gerda, Mrs Muthesius' camp assistants. It is Miss Ulrike who discovers the twins' family history when checking their personal information, but is forbidden by Mrs Muthesius from revealing the truth because the girls themselves already know.
- Josef Eipeldauer, the photographer who takes pictures of Luise and Lottie during their time at summer camp.
- Resi, the Palfy family's housekeeper.
- Dr Bernau, editor-in-chief of the Munich Illustrated and Luiselotte's employer.
- Benno Grawunder, the officiant of Ludwig and Luiselotte's second wedding.
- Dr Strobl, a Viennese paediatrician and one of the witnesses at Ludwig and Luiselotte's second wedding.
- Peperl, Dr Strobl's pet dog who becomes friends with both twins and is one of the witnesses at Ludwig and Luiselotte's second wedding.
- Anton Gabele, a Viennese artist, the Palfy family's neighbour, and one of the witnesses at Ludwig and Luiselotte's second wedding.

Other characters mentioned in the novel include Luise's and Lottie's classmates (e.g. Luise's friend Trude and the bully Anni Habersetzer) and teachers (e.g. Lottie's teacher Miss Linnekogel and Luise's headteacher Mr Killian).

== Differences between American and British English translations ==
In 2014, the novel was retranslated into English by Anthea Bell and republished in the United Kingdom and Australia by Pushkin Press as The Parent Trap, after the successful Disney films, replacing the 1962 English translation by Cyrus Brooks which is still published in the United States and Canada. Bell's translation is more faithful to the German original in line with the publisher's aim of introducing children to stories from different languages and cultures. In Bell's translation, the twins are named as Luise Palfy and Lottie Körner, explaining the use of a different title, and are stated to be named after their mother Luiselotte. In the same translation, the location of the summer camp is named as Seebühl on Lake Bühl, rather than "Bohrlaken" in the original English translation.

== Adaptations ==
- 1950: Two Times Lotte (Das doppelte Lottchen in German) with Isa and Jutta Günther (Germany), screenplay and narration by Erich Kästner
- 1951: Hibari no komoriuta (Japan)
- 1953: Twice Upon a Time (United Kingdom)
- 1961: The Parent Trap with Hayley Mills (United States)
- 1965: Kuzhandaiyum Deivamum (India, Tamil)
- 1966: Leta Manasulu (India, Telegu)
- 1968: Do Kaliyaan (India, Hindi)
- 1991: The Two Lottes (わたしとわたし –ふたりのロッテ– (Watashi to Watashi – Futari no Rottē) in Japanese) (Japan), a 29-episode anime TV series
- 1994: Charlie & Louise (Germany)
- 1995: It Takes Two with Mary-Kate and Ashley Olsen (United States)
- 1995: Strange Sisters (Iran)
- 1998: The Parent Trap with Lindsay Lohan (United States)
- 2001: Kuch Khatti Kuch Meethi (India)
- 2007: Two Times Lotte (Germany), an animated film
- 2016: Das doppelte Lottchen: Ein Comic (Germany), a graphic novel adaptation by Isabel Kreitz, with the artwork styled after Walter Trier's
- 2017: Das doppelte Lottchen (Germany), a television film
- 2022: Identical (United Kingdom), a musical

== See also ==
- Twice Blessed—A 1945 American comedy film with a very similar plot
