= Shame on You, Brigitte! =

1952 film

- Directed by: E.W. Emo
- Written by: Karl Farkas; E.W. Emo; Hugo Maria Kritz
- Based on: Bubusch by Gábor Vaszary
- Produced by: Heinrich Haas; Jakob Palle
- Starring: Heinz Rühmann; Hans Moser; Theo Lingen
- Cinematography: Oskar Schnirch
- Edited by: Hermann Leitner
- Music by: Heinz Sandauer
- Production company: Styria Film
- Distributed by: Gloria Film
- Release date: 5 September 1952
- Running time: 87 minutes
- Country: Austria
- Language: German

Shame on You, Brigitte! (German: Schäm' dich, Brigitte!) is a 1952 Austrian comedy film directed by E.W. Emo and starring Heinz Rühmann, Hans Moser and Theo Lingen. It was later released in West Germany under the alternative title Wir werden das Kind schon schaukeln. It is based on the play Bubusch, a German-language version of a work by Hungarian writer Gábor Vaszary, which had previously been adapted into the 1943 German film Geliebter Schatz.

The film was made with the backing of Gloria Film, which handled its distribution in the lucrative West German market. It was shot at the Schönbrunn Studios and on location around Vienna. The film's sets were designed by the art director Gustav Abel.

== Synopsis ==
When a mathematics teacher discovers a love letter on one of his students, Brigitte Schneider, he goes to visit her family to inform them. However, she persuades the maid to pretend to be her mother. Further confusion arises when her real mother later discovers the letter and assumes it has been written by her husband to his own lover.

== Cast ==
- Heinz Rühmann as Dr. Felix Schneider
- Hans Moser as Professor Karl Stieglitz
- Theo Lingen as Paul Fellmeier
- Hilde Berndt as Lilli Schneider
- Brigitte Ratz as Brigitte Schneider
- Annie Rosar as Lilli Schneiders Mutter
- Lotte Lang as Marie, Dienstmädchen
- Margarete Slezak as Rosi Stieglitz
- Nadja Tiller as Olga Fellmeier
- Gusti Wolf as Hilde - Wirtin und falsche Braut
- Egon von Jordan as Dr. Haberer, Rechtsanwalt
- Fritz Heller as Herr Kraus
- Chariklia Baxevanos as Hertha Engelberger

== Bibliography ==
- Fritsche, Maria. Homemade Men in Postwar Austrian Cinema: Nationhood, Genre and Masculinity. Berghahn Books, 2013.
