= Der schönste Tag meines Lebens =

1957 film directed by Max Neufeld

- Film poster
- Directed by: Max Neufeld
- Written by: Karl Leiter, Max Neufeld
- Starring: Michael Ande, Joseph Egger, Paul Hörbiger
- Cinematography: Václav Vích
- Edited by: Hermine Diethelm
- Music by: Heinz Neubrand
- Production company: Donau-Film Wien
- Release date: 1957
- Running time: 95 minutes
- Country: Austria
- Language: German

Der schönste Tag meines Lebens is a 1957 Austrian family drama film directed by Max Neufeld. It stars Michael Ande, Joseph Egger and Paul Hörbiger.

== Cast ==
- Michael Ande as Toni
- Joseph Egger as Blümel
- Paul Hörbiger as Direktor
- Paul Bösiger as Kapellmeister Schmidt
- Thomas Hörbiger as Kapellmeister Brunner
- Ellinor Jensen as Schwester Maria
- Richard Eybner as Präfekt Keppler
- Vienna Boys' Choir
