= The Landlady of Maria Wörth =

1952 film

- Directed by: Eduard von Borsody
- Written by: Fritz Böttger; Werner Eplinius; Walter Forster; Joachim Wedekind; Eduard von Borsody
- Produced by: Eduard Hoesch
- Starring: Maria Andergast; Mady Rahl; Rudolf Carl
- Cinematography: Walter Riml
- Edited by: Raimund Warta
- Music by: Hans Lang
- Production company: Donau-Filmproduktion Eduard Hoesch
- Distributed by: Union-Film
- Release date: 28 November 1952
- Running time: 86 minutes
- Country: Austria
- Language: German

The Landlady of Maria Wörth (German: Die Wirtin von Maria Wörth) is a 1952 Austrian comedy film directed by Eduard von Borsody and starring Maria Andergast, Mady Rahl and Rudolf Carl. The film's sets were designed by the art director Gustav Abel. Location shooting took place in Maria Wörth and around the Wörthersee in Carinthia.

== Synopsis ==
The twin daughters of a widowed landlady of a boarding house in Maria Wörth try and encourage a romance between her and a young American.

== Cast ==
- Maria Andergast as Franzl, die Wirtin des Seehotels am Wörthersee
- Harald Maresch as Fred Miller alias Fritz Deurtinger
- Mady Rahl as Lilo
- Rudolf Carl as Alois Kögerl, Bürgermeister
- Else Rambausek as Gretl Kögerl
- Michael Toost as Engelbert Waso
- Ludwig Schmidseder as Apotheker Angermüller
- Joseph Egger as Briefträger Seppl
- Erich Dörner as Lehrer Köhler
- Karl Hruschka as Schneider Fingerl
- Johannes Roth as Friseur Lederer
- Traute Servi as Zenzi
- Jutta Günther as Jutta
- Isa Günther as Isa

== Production ==
Die Wirtin von Maria Wörth was filmed on Lake Wörthersee in Carinthia as well as in Sankt Gilgen in the Salzkammergut, in the Sofiensäle in Vienna and in the studios in Salzburg-Parsch and Vienna-Sievering.

Various songs can be heard in the film, including Wirtin vom Wörthersee and Zwetschkenknödel-ödel-ödel from the pen of Hans Lang (music) and Erich Meder (lyrics), which have also been released on record, interpreted by Maria Andergast and Hans Lang.

== Criticism ==
For the film-dienst, the film was a "dull comedy about plum dumplings and the election of a "Miss Wörthersee". For the contemporary critics of Funk und Film, the film "serves up the usual mix: Hans Lang's 'Holdrio' music, interpreted by Maria Andergast" as well as a number of tried-and-tested comedians.

== Bibliography ==
- Fritsche, Maria. Homemade Men in Postwar Austrian Cinema: Nationhood, Genre and Masculinity. Berghahn Books, 2013.
