= Michael Ande =

German actor

- Born: October 5, 1944 (age 81); Bad Wiessee, Germany
- Occupation: Actor
- Years active: 1955–present

Michael Ande (born 5 October 1944, Bad Wiessee, Germany) is a German actor, best known for his role as Gerd Heymann in the German crime-drama television series Der Alte, which he played between 1977 and 2016.

He was a well-known German child star during the 1950s, playing a variety of roles, including choir boys. One film he acted in was Der schönste Tag meines Lebens (1957), in which he played a chorister in the Vienna Boys' Choir. Michael also played in two German films about the Trapp family: The Trapp Family (1956) and The Trapp Family in America (1958). These films were made some years before the 1965 U.S. film musical version of the Trapp films, The Sound of Music, was made. (The Broadway version appeared in 1959.) Michael played the role of Werner in the Trapp films. (In The Sound of Music, the boy's name is Kurt.) Ande, like many child actors, had difficulty continuing his career as an adult actor. He had problems being accepted as adult actor as he had such a youthful-looking face.

He gained much attention for the role of Jim Hawkins on television in Treasure Island, based on the novel by Robert Louis Stevenson, which was broadcast on Christmas 1966 for the first time.

Ande continued to act and appear on German television well into his seventies.

== Selected filmography ==
- Marianne of My Youth (1955) - Klein-Felix
- I Know What I'm Living For (1955) - Pit
- Reaching for the Stars (1955) - Peppino
- Holiday in Tyrol (1956) - Rosmarin von Stetten / Thymian Retzer
- Die Stimme der Sehnsucht (1956) - Ein Fischerjunge
- The Trapp Family (1956) - Werner von Trapp
- Das Hirtenlied vom Kaisertal (1956) - Hansl, Hüterbub
- Die Prinzessin von St. Wolfgang (1957) - Franzl, Josis Bruder
- Der schönste Tag meines Lebens (1957) - Toni
- Scandal in Bad Ischl (1957) - Prinz Franz
- El Hakim (1957) - Ibrahim als Kind
- The Doctor of Stalingrad (1958) - Sergej, Worotilows Sohn
- The Trapp Family in America (1958) - Werner von Trapp
- Don Vesuvio und das Haus der Strolche (1958)
- Majestät auf Abwegen (1958) - Maximilian III
- When the Bells Sound Clearly (1959) - Michael
- Little Lord Fauntleroy (1962, TV Movie) - Dick Tipton
- Peter Pan (1962, TV Movie)
- Die Grotte (1963, TV Movie) - Alexis - Küchenjunge
- Condemned to Sin (1964) - Albert, Starostas Sohn
- Hava, der Igel (1966, TV Movie) - Mendel Mandelblüth
- Die Schatzinsel (Treasure Island) (1966–1967, TV Mini-Series) - Jim Hawkins
- Der Paradiesgarten (1970)
- Der schwarze Graf (1970, TV Series) - Jonathan
- Das provisorische Leben (1971, TV Movie) - Andreas Ott
- Die Utopie des Damenschneiders Wilhelm Weitling (1971)
- Fuchs und Co (1972, TV Series) - Richard Fuchs
- Fußballtrainer Wulff (1972–1973, TV Series) - Heinz Kudrowski
- Scheibenschießen (1973, TV Movie) - Bert
- Die Powenzbande (1974, TV Mini-Series) - Kaspar Powenz
- Derrick (1975–1198, TV Series) - Gerd Heymann / Heinz Lissner / Richard Kern
- Der Alte (1977–2016, TV Series, 401 episodes) - Polizeiinspektor Gerd Heymann
- Polizeiinspektion 1 (1981–1986, TV Series)
- Liebe Melanie (1983, TV Movie) - Martin Reich
- Eichbergers besondere Fälle (1987), TV
- Zur Freiheit (1988, TV Series) - Penner
- Café Meineid - Herzliches Beileid (1994)
- Zurück auf Los! (2000) - Pkw-Fahrer
