= Harvest (1936 film) =

1936 film directed by Géza von Bolváry

- Directed by: Géza von Bolváry
- Written by: Philipp Lothar Mayring; Géza von Bolváry
- Starring: Paula Wessely; Attila Hörbiger; Artúr Somlay; Gina Falckenberg
- Cinematography: Franz Planer
- Edited by: Hermann Haller
- Music by: Heinz Sandauer
- Production company: Vienna Film
- Release date: 1 December 1936
- Running time: 89 minutes
- Country: Austria
- Language: German

Harvest (German: Ernte) is a 1936 Austrian romance film directed by Géza von Bolváry and starring Paula Wessely, Attila Hörbiger, and Artúr Somlay. It is also known by the alternative title Die Julika.

== Cast ==
- Paula Wessely as Julika
- Attila Hörbiger as Rittmeister Karl von Tamassy
- Artúr Somlay as Georg von Tamassy
- Gina Falckenberg as Grit von Hellmers
- Gábor Rajnay as Kutscher Johann, Julika's father
- Fred Hennings as Baron Felix Sandberg
- Johanna Terwin as Frau von Hellmers
- Ferdinand Mayerhofer as Parson
- Alfred Neugebauer as Lawyer
- Otto Storm as Verwalter
- Karl Ehmann as station-master
- Hermann Gruber as lackey
- Gisa Wurm as lady's-maid
