= Friedl Hardt =

German actress (1919–1991)

- Born: 28 January 1919
- Died: 11 June 1991 (aged 72)
- Occupation: Actress

Friedl Hardt (28 January 1919 – 11 June 1991) was a German actress.

== Selected filmography ==
- The Tiger Akbar (1951)
- Mikosch Comes In (1952)
- Arena of Death (1953)
- Hooray, It's a Boy! (1953)
- The Three from the Filling Station (1955)
- Love Is Just a Fairytale (1955)
- Yes, Yes, Love in Tyrol (1955)
- Drei Mann auf einem Pferd (1957)

== Bibliography ==
- Bergfelder, Tim & Bock, Hans-Michael. The Concise Cinegraph: Encyclopedia of German. Berghahn Books, 2009.
