= The First Kiss (1954 film) =

1954 film directed by Erik Ode

- Directed by: Erik Ode
- Written by: Juliane Kay; Aldo von Pinelli
- Produced by: Eduard Hoesch
- Starring: Isa Günther; Jutta Günther; Erich Auer
- Cinematography: Richard Angst
- Edited by: Herma Sandtner
- Music by: Peter Kreuder
- Production companies: Donau-Filmproduktion; Melodie Film
- Distributed by: Herzog Film
- Release date: 20 July 1954
- Running time: 95 minutes
- Countries: Austria; West Germany
- Language: German

The First Kiss (German: Der erste Kuß) is a 1954 Austrian-West German comedy film directed by Erik Ode and starring Isa Günther, Jutta Günther and Erich Auer. It was shot at the Salzburg Studios and on location around the city and the nearby area. The film's sets were designed by the art director Gustav Abel.

== Synopsis ==
Two twin sisters living in Salzburg encounter Paul, an aviator from Munich, and each enjoys what they think is a mild flirtation with him while pretending to be the other one. Paul is really in love with his fiancée back in Munich with whom he has quarrelled.

== Cast ==
- Isa Günther as Helga
- Jutta Günther as Gretel
- Erich Auer as Paul Merleth
- Hans Nielsen as Escher
- Adrienne Gessner as Omi
- Hanna Rucker as Ilse Dirks
- Rudolf Vogel as Mons. Oberbitzler
- Margaret Cargill as Inge Böhm
- Gisela Urbain as Lilli
- Alexander von Richthofen as Walter Beck
- Peter Vogel as Mathias Dammerl
- Johannes von Hamme as Ilses Vater

== Bibliography ==
- Fritsche, Maria. Homemade Men in Postwar Austrian Cinema: Nationhood, Genre and Masculinity. Berghahn Books, 2013.
