= Love, Summer and Music =

- Directed by: Hubert Marischka
- Written by: Franz Marischka; Hubert Marischka
- Produced by: Eduard Hoesch
- Starring: Joe Stöckel; Fritz Heller; Rudolf Wasserlof
- Cinematography: Herbert Körner
- Edited by: Hermine Diethelm
- Music by: Peter Igelhoff
- Production companies: Donau-Film Wien; Melodie Film
- Distributed by: Neue Filmverleih
- Release date: 16 November 1956
- Running time: 96 minutes
- Countries: Austria; West Germany
- Language: German

Love, Summer and Music (German: Liebe, Sommer und Musik) is a 1956 Austrian-German musical comedy film directed by Hubert Marischka and starring Joe Stöckel, Fritz Heller and Rudolf Wasserlof.

The film's sets were designed by the art director Willy Schatz. It was shot in Agfacolor.

== Cast ==
- Joe Stöckel as Ferdinand Lobmeier, Gastwirt
- Fritz Heller as Simon Lobmeier, Bürgermeister
- Rudolf Wasserlof as Toni Rinnertaler, Schüler der Forstakademie
- Dorit Kreysler as Resi Rinnertaler, Tonis Schwester
- Jutta Günther as Bettina Bertoni, Jazzsängerin
- Isa Günther as Netti, ihre Zwillingsschwester
- Heinz Conrads as Hugo Hasenbichl, Jazzmusiker
- Joseph Egger as Alois Rinnerthaler, der großvater
- Karl Friedrich as Sänger
- Theodor Grieg
- Rudi Hofstätter as Sänger
- Wolfgang Jansen as Emil Buschke
- Anton Karas as Zitherspieler
- Lonny Kellner as Sängerin
- Paul Kuhn as Sänger
- Hugo Lindinger
- Lotte Martens as Vroni, Kellnerin
- Claus Schmidt as Michl, Bauernbub
- Mimi Schwarz

== Bibliography ==
- Thomas Elsaesser & Michael Wedel. The BFI companion to German cinema. British Film Institute, 1999.
