= The Twins from Zillertal =

1957 film

- Directed by: Harald Reinl
- Written by: Karl Heinz Busse; Harald Reinl
- Produced by: Franz Seitz Jr.
- Starring: Isa Günther; Jutta Günther; Joachim Fuchsberger; Karin Dor
- Cinematography: Walter Riml
- Edited by: Herbert Taschner
- Music by: Karl Bette
- Production company: Franz Seitz Filmproduktion
- Distributed by: Constantin Film
- Release date: September 26, 1957
- Running time: 94 minutes
- Country: West Germany
- Language: German

The Twins from Zillertal (German: Die Zwillinge vom Zillertal) is a 1957 West German comedy film directed by Harald Reinl and starring the twins Isa Günther and Jutta Günther, Joachim Fuchsberger and Karin Dor. It takes its title from the Zillertal Valley in Tyrol. It was shot in Eastmancolor at the Bavaria Studios in Munich with location shooting in Austria at the Schloss Matzen, Krimml Waterfalls, Zell am Ziller and Innsbruck. The film's sets were designed by the art director Arne Flekstad. It was part of the post-Second World War boom in Heimatfilm.

== Cast ==
- Isa Günther as Christel
- Jutta Günther as Reserl
- Joachim Fuchsberger as Franz von Auerstein
- Karin Dor as Daniela Kleemann
- Hans Moser as Herr Schmauss
- Margarete Haagen as Baronin von Auerstein
- Werner Finck as Herr Kleemann
- Albert Rueprecht as Hans Burger
- Wolfgang Gruner as Konstantin Opel
- Theodor Danegger as Gschwandtner
- Viktor Afritsch as Raban
- Franz Loskarn as Ein Jäger
- Luitgard Diesch as Zenzi
- Alice Kessler as Guest appearance
- Ellen Kessler as Guest appearance
- Hans Terofal as Gast im 'Roten Adler'

== Bibliography ==
- Bock, Hans-Michael & Bergfelder, Tim. The Concise CineGraph. Encyclopedia of German Cinema. Berghahn Books, 2009.
- Pöschl, Kristina, Trescher, Miriam & Weber, Reinhard. Harald Reinl: der Regisseur, der Winnetou, Edgar Wallace und die Nibelungen ins Kino brachte : eine Bio- und Filmografie. 2011.
