= Kurt Meisel =

Austrian actor

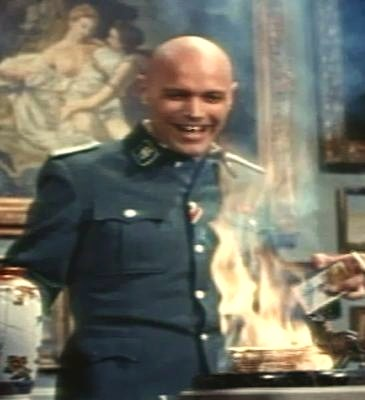
- Meisel in A Time to Love and a Time to Die (1958)
- Born: 18 August 1912; Vienna, Austria-Hungary
- Died: 4 April 1994 (aged 81); Vienna, Austria
- Occupations: Actor; Film director
- Years active: 1934–1994

Kurt Meisel (18 August 1912 – 4 April 1994) was an Austrian actor and film director. He appeared in 65 films between 1934 and 1994. He also directed 21 films between 1949 and 1984. Meisel was married to the actress Ursula Lingen. He was born and died in Vienna, Austria, and is buried on the Vienna Zentralfriedhof.

== Selected filmography ==
- Little Dorrit (1934) - Pit, sein Sohn
- Marriage Strike (1935) - Loisl
- Schlußakkord (1936) - Baron Salviany
- The Court Concert (1936) - Leutnant Florian Schwälble
- The Divine Jetta (1937) - Graf Eugen Opalla
- Such Great Foolishness (1937) - Specht - Rundfunkansager
- Love Can Lie (1937) - August Halfgreen
- Spiel auf der Tenne (1937) - Andreas 'Anderl' Rössmaier
- Another World (1937) - 2. Journalist
- Der Schimmelkrieg in der Holledau (1937) - Thomas, Bräubursch
- Frau Sylvelin (1938) - Herr von Roedern
- Nanon (1938) - Hector
- The Scoundrel (1939) - Ferdinand Scheibler
- A Woman Like You (1939) - Felix Petersen
- Eine kleine Nachtmusik (1940) - Max
- The Fire Devil (1940) - Erzherzog Johann
- Die keusche Geliebte (1940) - Francois Coogmann, Kunstmaler
- The Way to Freedom (1941) - Ein Student
- People in the Storm (1941) - Oberleutnant Duschan
- The Great King (1942) - Alfons
- The Rainer Case (1942) - Leutnant von Benda
- Die goldene Stadt (1942) - Toni Opferkuch - Annas Vetter, der Anna verführt
- Kolberg (1945) - Claus Werner
- Wozzeck (1947) - Wozzeck
- Verspieltes Leben (1949) - Karli Reindl
- Love on Ice (1950) - Toni Staudtner
- Der Teufel führt Regie (1951) - Poupoulle
- Until We Meet Again (1952) - Willy Wagner
- All Clues Lead to Berlin (1952) - Gregor Pratt
- Arena of Death (1953 - director)
- Ein toller Tag (1954) - Figaro, valet
- Emil and the Detectives (1954) - Herr Grundeis
- They Were So Young (1954) - Pasquale
- Hello, My Name is Cox (1955) - Oberkellner Youmac
- Jackboot Mutiny (1955) - SS Obergruppenführer
- Operation Sleeping Bag (1955) - Oberleutnant Taut
- Zwei blaue Augen (1955) - Eddi Witt
- Das Sonntagskind (1956) - Mann auf dem Schiff (uncredited)
- Vater sein dagegen sehr (1957) - Schneider
- Drei Mann auf einem Pferd (1957) - Freddy
- The Cat (1958) - Capitaine Heinz Muller
- A Time to Love and a Time to Die (1958) - Heini
- Embezzled Heaven (1958) - Mojmir
- Romarei, das Mädchen mit den grünen Augen (1959) - Baron de Tavel
- Dorothea Angermann (1959) - Mario Malloneck
- Court Martial (1959, Director)
- The Red Hand (1960, director)
- The Longest Day (1962) - Capt. Ernst Düring (uncredited)
- Leutnant Gustl (1963, TV film) - Major Mokry
- The Spendthrift (1964, director)
- Two Girls from the Red Star (1966) - Sapparov
- Congress of Love (1966) - Semmelbein, the jeweler
- Man on Horseback (1969) - Kanzler
- Strogoff (1970) - Feofar Khan
- The Odessa File (1974) - Alfred Oster
- Derrick – Season 3, Episode 14: "Der Mann aus Portofino" (1976) - Ingo Parenge
- Please, Let the Flowers Live (1986) - Eisenbeiss
- The Post Office Girl (1988, TV film) - Hofrat Elkins
