= Arena of Death =

1953 film

- Directed by: Kurt Meisel
- Written by: O. H. Dangl; Hans Herbert; Sepp Walter; Raimund Warta
- Produced by: Otto Grund; Heinz Wolff
- Starring: Richard Häussler; Katharina Mayberg; Friedl Hardt
- Cinematography: Elio Carniel
- Edited by: Raimund Warta
- Music by: Heinz Sandauer
- Production companies: Bristol-Film Hein Wolff; Listo Film
- Distributed by: Deutsche Comerz-Film
- Release date: August 1953
- Running time: 90 minutes
- Countries: Austria; West Germany
- Language: German

Arena of Death (German: Die Todesarena) is a 1953 Austrian–West German crime film directed by Kurt Meisel and starring Richard Häussler, Katharina Mayberg, and Friedl Hardt.

The film's sets were designed by the art directors Gustav Abel and Nino Borghi.

== Cast ==
- Richard Häussler as Diego Moreno
- Katharina Mayberg as Manuela Moreno
- Friedl Hardt as Helli Singer
- Bert Fortell as Gino Belotti
- Elfe Gerhart as Roberta, Chansonette
- Fritz Imhoff as Dr. Reiner, Kriminalrat
- Helli Servi as Rosi
- Die 3 Motorellos as Themselves
- Franz Böheim as Francesco
- Heribert Meisel as Ansager
- Leopold Rudolf as Brugger, Rennmechaniker
- Ernst Waldbrunn

== Bibliography ==
- Fritsche, Maria (2013). Homemade Men in Postwar Austrian Cinema: Nationhood, Genre and Masculinity. New York: Berghahn Books. ISBN 978-0-85745-946-6.
