= Isa and Jutta Günther =

German twin actresses

Isa and Jutta Günther (born 27 May 1938 Munich) are German twin former actresses.

== Biography ==
Isa and Jutta Günther were trained in ballet for nine years. They began their film careers in 1950 when they played the roles of Luise Palfy and Lotte Körner in Two Times Lotte, a film based on the children's novel of the same name by Erich Kästner. Though the film was a box office hit, which also earned Kästner the Filmband in Gold, the subsequent heimatfilms in which the Günther twins appeared were more or less forgotten. The sisters also had guest roles in the 1954 musical film An jedem Finger zehn, with Bibi Johns and Josephine Baker among others.

Isa played only one role without her twin sister: Klara Sesemann in the Swiss films Heidi (1952) and Heidi and Peter (1955).

The Günther twins ended their film careers at the age of 20, later married, and have been living privately. Since marrying, Jutta has been known as Jutta Günther-Westerbarkey, Isa as Isa Wimmer.

== Filmography (selected) ==
- 1950: Two Times Lotte (based on the book of the same name by Erich Kästner)
- 1952: The Landlady of Maria Wörth
- 1952: Heidi
- 1953: Ich und meine Frau
- 1954: The First Kiss
- 1954: Ten on Every Finger
- 1955: Du bist die Richtige
- 1955: Heidi and Peter
- 1956: Love, Summer and Music
- 1956: Die Fischerin vom Bodensee
- 1957: Vier Mädels aus der Wachau
- 1957: The Twins from Zillertal
- 1958: Der Sündenbock von Spatzenhausen
