= Gustav Abel =

Austrian art director

- Born: 25 January 1902; Vienna, Austro-Hungarian Empire
- Died: 2 June 1963 (aged 61); Vienna, Austria
- Occupation: Art director
- Years active: 1924–1954 (film)

Gustav Abel (1902–1963) was an Austrian art director.

== Selected filmography ==
- The Silent Partner (1939)
- Father For a Night (1939)
- A Woman Has Fallen (1941)
- The Hero of Venice (1941)
- Captain Tempest (1942)
- The Lion of Damascus (1942)
- The Fourth Commandment (1950)
- No Sin on the Alpine Pastures (1950)
- The Fall of Valentin (1951)
- Shame on You, Brigitte! (1952)
- The Landlady of Maria Wörth (1952)
- Arena of Death (1953)
- The Spendthrift (1953)
- The First Kiss (1954)

== Bibliography ==
- Fritsche, Maria (2013). Homemade Men in Postwar Austrian Cinema: Nationhood, Genre and Masculinity. New York: Berghahn Books. ISBN 978-0-85745-946-6.
