= The Two Lottes =

- わたしとわたし －ふたりのロッテ－
- Based on: Lisa and Lottie by Erich Kästner
- Written by: Haruka Yamazaki; Michiru Shimada; Taeko Okina
- Directed by: Kenji Kodama
- Opening theme: Image na kankei by Wink
- Ending theme: Tsuioku no Heroine by Wink
- Composer: Kazuo Ōtani
- Country of origin: Japan
- Original language: Japanese
- No. of episodes: 29

Production
- Producer: Hibiki Ito (NTV); Yasumichi Ozaki (TMS)
- Editor: Mitsuhisa Tsurubuchi
- Running time: 24 minutes
- Production company: Tokyo Movie Shinsha

Original release
- Network: NTV
- Release: November 9, 1991 – September 5, 1992

The Two Lottes (Note: わたしとわたし －ふたりのロッテ－, Watashi to watashi Futari no rotte) is a 1991 Japanese animated television series that aired on Nippon Television from November 9, 1991, to September 5, 1992. Produced by Tokyo Movie Shinsha, the series is an adaptation of the book Lisa and Lottie by Erich Kästner and the first for television.

== Cast ==
- Rei Sakuma as Lotte
- Hiromi Tsuru as Palffy
- Rihoko Yoshida as Luiselotte
- Kei Tomiyama as Ludwig
- Shigeru Nakahara as Hans
- Taeko Kawata as Ilse
- Urara Takano as Annie
- Mika Kanai as Trude
- Masako Miura as Steffie
- Keiko Han as Irene
- Akira Kume as the narrator
