= Sole custody =

Child custody awarded to only one parent

Sole custody is a child custody arrangement whereby only one parent has custody of a child. In the most common use of the term, sole custody refers to a context in which one parent has sole physical custody of a child.

== Types of custody ==
Depending upon the jurisdiction, custody may be divided into two components, legal custody and physical custody. Physical custody relates to the child's legal domicile and where the child resides. Legal custody involves the parents' participation in important life decisions pertaining to the child, such as significant medical decisions or where the child attends school. It is not uncommon for a parent with sole physical custody to share legal custody with the other parent, but it is uncommon for parents to share physical custody while one parent has sole legal custody.

== History and prevalence ==
Historically, sole custody was the most common form of child custody granted after divorce. Since the 1980s, joint physical custody with shared parenting have become much more common, and in some jurisdictions there is a legislative preference or presumption in favor of joint legal custody, joint physical custody or both. Research indicates that children fare better in joint custody arrangements, or custody arrangements that allow a child to have good access to both parents.

Although women are granted sole custody more often than men, it is a popular misconception common in the men's rights movement that this is due to systemic bias; in reality it is because men infrequently contest or seek it.

== See also ==
- Alternating custody
- Bird's nest custody
- Child custody
- Divorce
- Family law
- Family court
- Parens patriae
- Parenting plan
- Shared parenting
- Split custody
- Third-party custody
- Ward of the state
