= Scoundrel (book) =

2022 book by Sarah Weinman

Scoundrel: How a Convicted Murderer Persuaded the Women Who Loved Him, the Conservative Establishment, and the Courts to Set Him Free
- Author: Sarah Weinman
- Language: English
- Subject: Edgar Smith
- Publisher: Ecco Press
- Publication date: February 22, 2022
- Pages: 464
- ISBN: 978-0-06-289976-7

Scoundrel: How a Convicted Murderer Persuaded the Women Who Loved Him, the Conservative Establishment, and the Courts to Set Him Free is a 2022 book by Sarah Weinman that examines the life of Edgar Smith.
