= Dirty Rotten Scoundrels =

Dirty Rotten Scoundrels may refer to:

- Dirty Rotten Scoundrels (film), a 1988 film starring Steve Martin and Michael Caine
- Dirty Rotten Scoundrels (musical), a Broadway musical based on the 1988 film
- The Dirty Rotten Scoundrels, a British electronic music duo
- DRS (band), a 1990s contemporary R&B group
- Jeru the Damaja (born 1972), American hip hop musician who was formerly known as D. Original Dirty Rotten Scoundrel
