= Niddy Impekoven =

German dancer (1904–2002)

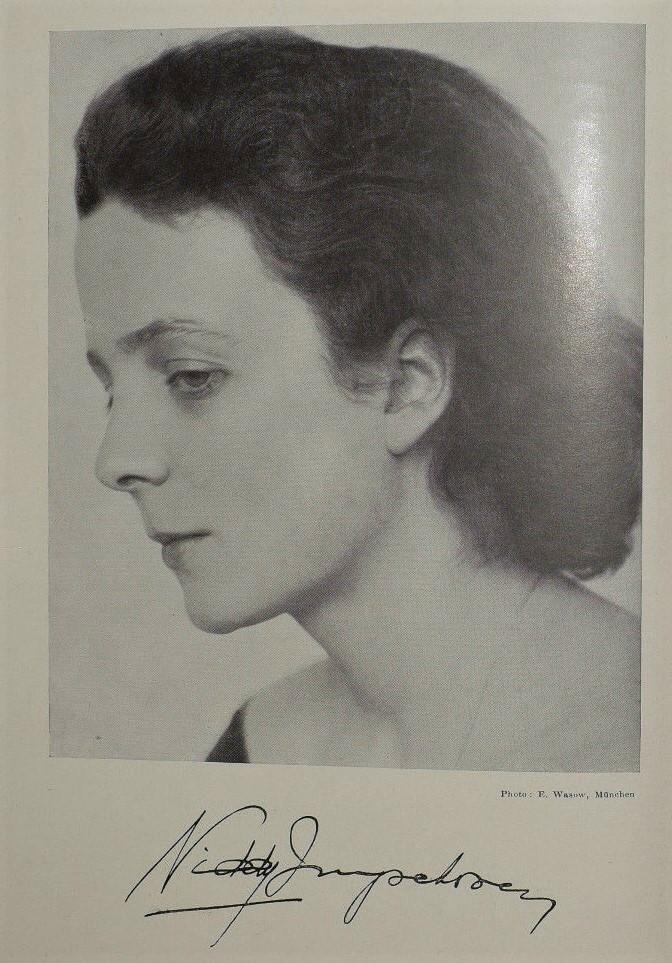
Niddy Impekoven in 1933

Luise "Niddy" Impekoven (2 November 1904 – 20 November 2002) was a German dancer of the Golden Twenties.

== Career ==
Impekoven took up dancing at a young age and first performed publicly in 1910. She was considered a child prodigy and received intense dance training from Heinrich Kröller and others.

She danced almost exclusively to classical music. Her performances were expressionistic and sometimes humorous. Her well-known choreographies included Der gefangene Vogel, Münchner Kaffeewärmer, and Schalk. Impekoven became famous outside Germany during the 1920s, performing in Vienna and Prague. By the 1930s she had toured in the United Kingdom, France, the United States, Java and Ceylon.

She appeared in three 1920s films, most notably Ways to Strength and Beauty.

She retired from professional dancing in 1934, in part due to the Nazi seizure of power, and went on to live in Switzerland, where she published her memoirs in 1955.

== Personal life ==
Impekoven was born in 1904 in Berlin to Toni and Frieda Impekoven. The family later moved to Frankfurt and then Munich. In 1919 she experienced a personal crisis, suffering from depression and anorexia nervosa; her parents brought her to Bad Ragaz, Switzerland, where she recovered under the care of Reinhard Goering.

She married Hans Killian in 1923 but they divorced in 1929. She died in 2002 in Bad Ragaz.
