= Frieda Impekoven =

Righteous Among the Nations

Frieda Impekoven (née Kobler; German: [ˈfʁiː.da ˈɪm.pə.koːfn̩]; 1880 – after 1966) was a Swiss or German (Note: Born in Switzerland. Yad Vashem lists her nationality as German, some other sources as Swiss.) woman who protected Jews during the Holocaust.

== Life ==
Frieda Kobler was born in Zürich in 1880. Her father was an industrialist. She later married the German playwright Toni Impekoven, their daughter Niddy Impekoven was born in 1904 and would go on to be a successful dancer. All three were opposed to the Nazi government and its racial policies.

Impekoven was contacted in 1943 by Ms Wölffler, who had been evicted from her home and lived in a house designated only for Jews. She brought food to the elderly Jewish woman. Impekoven was questioned about her relations with Wölffler, but was left alone after a Gestapo officer recognised that her daughter was a famous dancer. Wölffler however was later deported to Theresienstadt.

Another time she offered her apartment to another Jewish woman, Margarete Knewitz. While Impekoven went to visit her husband in Strasbourg, Knewitz was allowed to stay in her apartment. In this manner, Knewitz escaped deportation and wound up finding lasting accommodation in Stuttgart.

After her husband's death in 1947, Impekoven moved back to Switzerland. In 1966 she was recognised as Righteous Among the Nations by Yad Vashem.

== See also ==
- List of Righteous Among the Nations
- Righteous Among the Nations
