= The Scoundrel (1939 film) =

1939 comedy film by Hans Deppe

- Directed by: Hans Deppe
- Written by: Hans Reimann (play) Toni Impekoven (play); Otto Bielen; Walter F. Fichelscher
- Produced by: Walter F. Fichelscher
- Starring: Hans Moser; Josefine Dora; Herma Relin; Josi Kleinpeter
- Cinematography: Erich Claunigk
- Music by: Franz R. Friedl
- Production company: Tobis Film
- Distributed by: Tobis Film
- Release date: 4 August 1939
- Running time: 75 minutes
- Country: Germany
- Language: German

The Scoundrel or The Grouch (German: Das Ekel) is a 1939 German comedy film, directed by Hans Deppe and starring Hans Moser, Josefine Dora and Herma Relin. It is based on the play The Scoundrel by Hans Reimann and Toni Impekoven, which had previously been made into a 1931 film.

== Cast ==
- Hans Moser as Karl Sträubler
- Josefine Dora as Karoline Sträubler
- Herma Relin as Leni Sträubler
- Josi Kleinpeter as Fritz Sträubler
- Hans Junkermann as Matthias Scheibler
- Kurt Meisel as Ferdinand Scheibler
- Fritz Kampers as August Weichert
- Hans Holt as Heinrich Weichert
- Else von Möllendorff as Gusti Pitzinger
- Ernst Waldow as Sperling
- Lotte Spira as Anna Weichert
- Leo Peukert as Anton Pitzinger
- Anton Pointner as Albert Hartung
- Julius Brandt as Richter
- Walter Schramm-Duncker as Vorsteher Specht
- Lena Haustein as Frieda, Köchin
- Otto Sauter-Sarto as Gefängniswärter
- Liesl Eckardt as Luftballonverkäuferin
- Harry Hardt as Kegelsbruders Lehrer
- Hans Waschatko as Direktor des Strassenbahngesellschaft
- Karl Harbacher as Kegelbruder
- Vincenz Prossl
- Edmund Pouch as Gerichtssekretär
- Hannes Schneider
- Hugo Flink

== Bibliography ==
- Hake, Sabine. Popular Cinema of the Third Reich. University of Texas Press, 2001.
