= Ina Gerhein =

German opera singer (1906–1995)

- Born: Sabine Heinzinger; 22 October 1906; Munich, Germany
- Died: 11 February 1995 (aged 88); Starnberg, Germany
- Occupations: Operatic mezzo-soprano; Operatic contralto
- Organizations: Bavarian State Opera
- Title: Kammersängerin

Ina Gerhein is the stage name of Sabine Heinzinger (29 October 1906 – 11 February 1995), a German operatic mezzo-soprano and contralto who was a long-term member of the Bavarian State Opera.

== Life and career ==
Born Sabine Heinzinger in Munich, Gerhein attended a girls' gymnasium. She studied voice with the contralto Luise Willer in Munich. In addition, she received speaking and acting lessons from Georg Putscher. She had her first engagement in the 1927/28 season as a volunteer (Volontärin) at the Bavarian State Opera.

She moved to the Theater Heilbronn, to the Hessisches Staatstheater Wiesbaden in 1929, and then to the Staatsoper Stuttgart. From 1934 to 1941 she was the first alto at the Theater Freiburg. From 1941, she was a member of the Bavarian State Opera where she remained until her retirement in 1967. There she was regarded as a highly esteemed and extremely popular singer with the audience. For more than twenty years, Gerhein took part in the Munich Opera Festival almost annually. She was appointed Bayerische Kammersängerin.

Gerhein sang a broad repertoire ranging from contralto to dramatic mezzo-soprano. She frequently alternated in various roles with her teacher Luise Willer. Her roles included the title role in Bizet's Carmen, Azucena in Verdi's Il trovatore, Brangäne in Wagner's Tristan und Isolde, and the Witch in Humperdinck's Hänsel und Gretel. Other important opera roles, especially later in her career, were Erda in Wagner's Der Ring des Nibelungen (among others 1952 in the Ring performances in Munich under Hans Knappertsbusch), the housekeeper Marzelline in Rossini's Der Barbier von Sevilla, Annina in Der Rosenkavalier by Richard Strauss, Ludmila in Smetana's Die verkaufte Braut and Mother Goose in Stravinsky's The Rake's Progress. In December 1959, she appeared as Marzelline in a performance at the Nationaltheater München which became legendary, alongside Erika Köth, Fritz Wunderlich and Hermann Prey, conducted by Joseph Keilberth. The performance was recorded for television and later published by Deutsche Grammophon on DVD (2005) and CD.

In the course of her career, Gerhein appeared as a guest at the Semperoper in Dresden, the Staatsoper Stuttgart, and the Dublin Opera House, among others. In the 1951/52 season, she appeared at the Teatro dell'Opera di Roma as the Overseer in Elektra by Richard Strauss. In 1953, she performed at the Maggio Musicale Fiorentino at the Teatro Comunale di Firenze as Magdalene in Wagner's Die Meistersinger von Nürnberg. She appeared at La Fenice in Venice with the ensemble of the Bavarian State Opera.

In addition to her opera career, Gerhein was also active as a concert and lieder singer. After her retirement from the stage she lived in Berg at Lake Starnberg. She died in February 1995 at the age of 88 and was buried in Wolfratshausen.

== Recordings ==
Several live recordings and radio recordings documenting Gerhein's voice, mainly from the 1950s. In a performance of Pfitzner's Palestrina, she sang the Appatition of Lucrezia. It was conducted by Robert Heger at the Prinzregententheater in Munich in 1951. She recorded two versions of Der Rosenkavalier by Richard Strauss in the role of Annina, both from Munich, in July 1952 alongside Kurt Böhme as Ochs conducted by Erich Kleiber, and in September 1957 alongside Otto Edelmann as Ochs, conducted by Knappertsbusch. She also recorded the final scene of the second act a recording with Josef Greindl as Ochs, conducted in 1951 by Eugen Szenkar. In another production of the Bavarian State Opera, she appeared as Ursula in Feuersnot by Richard Strauss, conducted in 1958 by Kempe.

Gerhein sang the role of Marthe in Lortzing's Undine in a radio recording of RAI from September 1953, again conducted by Heger. She sang the Widow Browe in Lortzings's Zar und Zimmermann in a 1956 radio recording of Bayerischer Rundfunk, conducted by Jan Koetsier. In some re-releases of audio documents, Gerhein is mistakenly referred to as Ina Gerheim.

== Awards ==
- 1973: Order of Merit of the Federal Republic of Germany.
- 1996: Entry into the portrait gallery of the Nationaltheater München.
