= Scoundrels (novel) =

Series of comic adventure novels

Scoundrels is a series of comic adventure novels first published in 2017 by Major Victor Cornwall and Major Arthur St. John Trevelyan (the pseudonyms of the authors Duncan Crowe and James Peak, who also feature as the book's unwilling editors). Print copies are published by Black Door Press Ltd., Fitzrovia, London, and distributed by Turnaround Ltd., Wood Green, London. Ebooks are published by Farrago Books, an imprint of Prelude Books, Richmond, London.

== Scoundrels Volume One ==
Scoundrels Volume One was distributed to UK bookshops on 29 June 2017. A second edition with minor textual changes was printed in July 2017. A second printing of the second edition was made available in December 2017, and a third printing of the second edition in February 2018. A third edition with further minor textual changes was distributed in November 2018.

== Background ==
Revolving around the infamous gentlemen's club of Piccadilly, Scoundrels is the memoirs of the disreputable, antagonistic and unreconstructed Majors, Victor Cornwall and St. John Trevelyan. The book relies on a complex conceit: that both Cornwall and Trevelyan are unhappy at the prospect of the other beginning work on an autobiography – for fear of their reputation being sullied. As their lives have been so horribly intertwined since their early schooldays, the Majors come to an uneasy agreement: to write a chapter each, in turn, of a joint autobiography. The entire novel is therefore epistolary - structured as a series of letters between the Majors, within which are chapters from their shared history. These letters contain a great number of astonishing adventures including panda hunting with the last Chinese Emperor, the storming of the Nazi Castle Klunghammer, and the heist of the Picasso painting, Big Lady On A Table.

Scoundrels Volume One, aka Scoundrels, covers the period 1931–1951.

== Critical reception ==
The book has received positive reviews for its humour, lightness of touch, imaginative storylines, and the antagonistic relationship between Majors Cornwall and Trevelyan. The Daily Telegraph called it "immensely satisfying... a panda-hunting, Everest-climbing, Nazi-castle- storming adventure." Mark Time, the author of Going Commando, said it was "seriously hilarious. The book I wish I could write. An ingeniously crafted farce that blunderbusses its way around the world in a rollicking mix of absurdity and brilliance." The book has received many five-star reviews and favourable ratings at Waterstones, Foyles and Goodreads.com.

In August 2017, The Chap Magazine published a full-page review of Scoundrels, by Mark Mason: "The trouble with most spoof biographies is that they don't concentrate enough on the 'biography' aspect. So desperate are they to get you laughing that they throw a million gags in your face, completely forgetting to make the central character interesting or even believable. The core genius of Scoundrels is that its authors have avoided that mistake. Right from page one, you love Major Victor Cornwall and Major Arthur St John Trevelyan, despite - or rather because of - the fact that they're grade one, nailed-on, ocean-going shits... It's the book's exquisite over-the-topness that keeps you coming back for more."

Upon publication, Scoundrels provoked interest in the value of "male banter" and about joint-writing enterprises in the Daily Telegraph and The Independent newspapers. The Daily Telegraph reported that "Scoundrels captures the essence of this humor as therapy. It celebrates a blokey, showboating spirit, outrageous boastfulness and sheer idiocy as elements that are vital to male happiness." It quoted Peak as saying: "I'd say humour is at the heart of most male friendships. Some blokes get together to play squash. Some go down the pub. Others hang out and tinker with motorbikes, but while doing so they're wondering 'how can I make these idiots laugh?'" and Crowe explains: " getting a laugh from someone is always gratifying – but even more so when you respect their sense of humour. It's a kind of validation. You make another bloke laugh who is your peer and their laughter is a recognition of a truth. It's good for the soul."

In July 2017, Peak gave a radio interview on Hannah Murray's The Book Show on Talk Radio Europe about the challenges of writing a novel with a partner in which he revealed that the experience had proved "so enjoyable" that Scoundrels Volume Two will be published in September 2018. He also revealed that the authors have planned Cornwall and Trevelyan's life stories as "at least a trilogy" of novels, each to be more surprising, sordid, and hilarious than the last.

== Scoundrels Volume Two: The Hunt For Hansclapp ==
Scoundrels 'Volume Two: The Hunt For Hansclapp' was published in the UK on September 6 2018. It continues the narrative of Volume One, covering the Major's adventures during the years 1952–to 1974. The Majors continue to bicker and boast in their letters to each other as they recall kidnapping in the Congo, manslaughter on the Orient Express and romance at the Stasi Christmas Party. Volume Two in November was made one of The Spectator Magazine's Books of the Year: "The highlight in fiction was Scoundrels: The Hunt For Hansclapp... Duncan Crowe and James Peak once again pull off the balancing act achieved by only the very best spoofs - making it real enough to be believable, ridiculous enough to be funny." A review in Book Decoder described it as "quirkily funny... hilarious and absurd." One reviewer, Sarah Douglas, wanted "to have a disastrous marriage with this book," describing it as "great fun and perfectly done."

Scoundrels Volume Two covers the period 1952–1974.

During October to December 2018, Crowe and Peak made appearances at several branches of Waterstones and Foyles in London and the South East of England to discuss the books.

In late November 2018, The Hunt For Hansclapp was nominated for the Literary Review's Bad Sex in Fiction Award, for "author(s) who ... produced an outstandingly bad scene of sexual description in an otherwise good novel." Crowe and Peak were reportedly delighted to be considered for this award, which has been previously won by John Updike, AA Gill, Ben Okri, Melvyn Bragg, Tom Wolfe, and Norman Mailer. However, the book was widely recognised by the judges as taking a deliberate tilt at the award, leading Frank Brinkley of the Literary Review to quote from the book and remark: "Some of the entries were so over the top as to be almost outrageous." The Times' Diary reported that: "Scoundrels (was) rejected by the judges as it was too obviously written to win. 'We cheated,' Peak admits, 'We're like a couple of literary Lance Armstrongs.'"

The 2018 Bad Sex in Fiction Award went to James Frey for his novel 'Katarina', with Crowe and Peak collecting the award from the pop star Kim Wilde on Frey's behalf.

== Scoundrels Volume Three: Her Majesty's Pleasure ==
A third novel entitled 'Volume Three: Her Majesty's Pleasure' completes the Majors' joint autobiography with, according to Crowe, "a shuddering climax. A right royal rumble at the very heart of the British Establishment." Volume Three was published on 2 December 2021 to critical acclaim.

Scoundrels Volume Three covers the period 1972–1984 and concludes the Majors' life story.

== BBC Shelf Isolation ==
On 4th April 2021, the actor Alex Norton picked the Scoundrels novels as favourite books, on BBC Scotland's culture programme Shelf Isolation. "if you get this book, don't get it for your granny or maiden aunt. Do not do that. It is genuinely, hysterically funny. But if you are easily offended, stay away from it. But if you really want a good belly laugh, a rip-roaring laugh, buy it."

== Film & TV Adaptation ==
The film and television rights to the Scoundrels novels were acquired by the London film company Rocket Science.

== Literary Representation ==
The Scoundrels novels are represented by Charlie Campbell at Greyhound Literary, of London.

== Authors' Lives ==
James Peak and Duncan Crowe appeared in the BBC Radio 4 series The Banksy Story, broadcast in 2023 and 2024. Duncan Crowe died in October 2024.
