= The Scoundrel (play) =

German comedy play

The Scoundrel (German: Das Ekel) is a comedy play by the German writers Hans Reimann and Toni Impekoven. It was adapted into three films: The Scoundrel (1931), The Scoundrel (1939) and The Domestic Tyrant (1959). Two television adaptations have also been made.
