= Alternating custody =

Alternating custody can have two different meanings. It is typically used when parents take turns having sole custody of a child based on a regular schedule, while the non-custodial parent has visitation rights. For example, the father may have sole custody on odd years while mother has sole custody on even years. Also called divided custody, this is a very rare type of child custody, typically utilized when the parents of a child live long distances away from each other.

At other times, the term is used as a synonym for divided custody, a form of joint physical custody where the child lives approximately equal time with the two parent, for example with weekly or bi-weekly exchanges.

In the teen comedy film, Clueless, Christian Stovitz is a high-school student who, due to his parents' divorce, spends alternating semesters at Bronson Alcott High and at a school in Chicago.

== See also ==
- Divorce
- Child custody
- Family law
- Parenting plan
- Shared parenting
