= Edmund Nick =

German composer and conductor (1891–1974)

Edmund Nick (22 September 1891 – 11 April 1974) was a German composer, conductor, and music writer.

== Biography ==
The son of a merchant, Nick studied law from 1910 to 1915 in Vienna and Graz. At the same time, he studied music at the Vienna Music Academy and at the Conservatorium Dresden. He received his doctorate in law (Dr. jur.) from the University Graz in 1918. Nick moved to Breslau in 1919, working as concert accompanist, piano teacher and critic. He became Kapellmeister of the theatre in Breslau in 1921 and Head of the Music Department of Radio Silesia in 1924.

It was here that he first met Erich Kästner; Nick wrote the music to a radio play by Kästner which became very successful. This was the beginning of a lifelong friendship.

In 1933 he moved to Berlin, where he was head of music at the Theater des Volkes from 1936 to 1940.

In 1945 he moved to Munich, starting as a critic at the Neue Zeitung. He then became musical director of the cabaret Die Schaubude where he continued his collaboration with Erich Kästner; eventually, he set more than 60 of Kästner's works to music. In 1947 he became for two years chief conductor of the Bavarian State Operetta. He was made professor in 1949 at the Hochschule für Musik und Theater München; from 1952 to 1956 he was head of the music department of the Westdeutscher Rundfunk in Cologne. He then worked as a music critic for the paper Die Welt, and since 1962 for the Süddeutsche Zeitung.

He wrote piano works, chamber music, film scores, and music for theatre and radio plays; he is mostly known for his musical comedies and operettas.

== Stage works ==
Selected stage works:

=== Operettas ===
- Über alles siegt die Liebe (Bruno Hardt-Warden, based on Karl Gutzkow's Zopf und Schwert) (1940 Berlin, Theater des Volkes)
- Das Halsband der Königin (Gerhard Metzner) (1 December 1948 Munich, Bavarian State Operetta)

=== Musical comedies ===
- Das kleine Hofkonzert (Paul Verhoeven, Toni Impekoven) (19 November 1935 Munich, Munich Kammerspiele)
- Die glücklichen Tage (1937 Bremen)
- Xantippe (1938 Frankfurt (Main))
- Titus macht Karriere (based on Talisman by Johann Nestroy by Gerhard Metzner) (1939 Berlin, Theater an der Behrenstraße)
- Nur für Erwachsene (1941 Berlin)
- Dreimal die Eine (1941 Leipzig)
- Karussell! – Karussell! (Gustel Graepp, Rudolf Rieth) (1941 Darmstadt)
- Der Prinzgemahl (Fritz Schwiefert) (1938)

=== Revues ===
- Freut euch des Lebens! (1936 Berlin)
