= Third-party custody =

In some custody situations, it is possible that the child/children will not remain with either of their natural, biological, parents, but instead custody is awarded to a third person. Generally speaking, third-party custody occurs when one of two options occur:

- The biological parents do not want custody of the child/children.
- The biological parents are incapable of caring for the child/children.

== Voluntary relinquishment ==
Occasionally, parents will agree to allow an adult (who is not either of the two parents) to raise their child/children. Generally, if either parent changes his/her mind later in the child's life, he/she has the option to seek custody at that point.

== Unfit parents ==
Custody may be awarded to a third adult (who is not either of the two parents) because the parents both seemed unfit to do so. Reasons that the court would retain authority over the child/children and later award custody to a third adult include:

- Child abuse/neglect.
- Substance abuse.
- Deliberate desertion/abandonment of the child/children.
- Inability to provide an adequate income which is necessary for the raising of a child.

== See also ==
- Divorce
- Family law
- Family court
- Legal custody
- Parens patriae
- Parenting plan
- Physical custody
- Shared parenting
- Ward of the state
