= Hans Reimann (writer) =

German satirist, novelist and playwright (1889–1969)

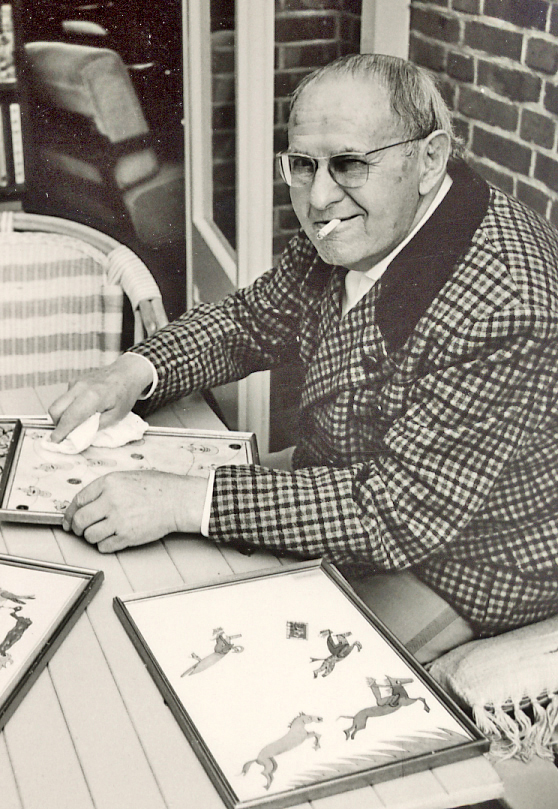
Hans Reimann (writer)

Hans Reimann (1889–1969) was a German satirist, novelist, and playwright. He wrote under the pseudonyms Max Bunge, Hans Heinrich, Artur Sünder, Hanns Heinz Vampir, and Andreas Zeltner.

== Biography ==
Albert Johannes Reimann was born on 18 November 1889 in Leipzig where he grew up. He studied German philology and art history at the Kunstakademie in Munich. After serving in the German army during World War I, he published the satirical journal Der Drache (The Dragon) in Leipzig from 1919 till 1921 from 1924 till 1929 the Stachelschwein (Porcupine) in Frankfurt on the Main. He worked also for the satirical Simplicissimus and Die Weltbühne and founded the cabarets "Retorte" (in Leipzig) und "Astoria" (in Frankfurt on the Main.). He lived in Berlin since 1925.

Having expressed critiques of the Nazis and planned a Hitler parody under the title Mein Krampf (My Cramp), he experienced great difficulties and was blacklisted by the Nazi regime. He wrote under several pseudonyms and also co-wrote with Heinrich Spoerl. A secret report by Carl Zuckmayer, who worked for a US agency, suggested "that Reimann published in anti-semitic journals and found ways of arranging himself with the Nazis" (a similar allegation by Moritz Lederer was in a 1958 court case judged unfounded). After the fall of the "Third Reich" in 1945, Reimann was forbidden to publish in Allied-occupied Germany until 1948. Then he began writing for the Munich satirical journal Simpl, moved 1951 to Schmalenbeck near Hamburg and published Literazzia. He died on 13 June 1969 in Schmalenbeck.

Reimann is the grandfather of the German lyricist Andreas Reimann.

== Works ==
- 1916: Die Dame mit den schönen Beinen, grotesque
- 1917: Das verbotene Buch, grotesques
- 1917: Die Dinte wider das Blut (under the pseudonym Artur Sünder)
- 1918: Das Paukerbuch, satires
- 1918: Tyll, autobiographical
- 1921: Ewers. Ein garantiert verwahrloster Schundroman in Lumpen, Fetzchen, Mätzchen und Unterhosen von Hanns Heinz Vampir
- 1921-31: Sächsische Miniaturen
- 1922: Hedwig Courths-Mahler. Schlichte Geschichten fürs traute Heim (with illustrations by George Grosz)
- 1924: Der Ekel (together with Toni Impekoven), comedy, first performance 1926; probably correctly titled "Das Ekel"
- 1928: Komponist wider Willen, Novel
- 1928: Neue Sächsische Miniaturen. Together with Karl Holtz (illustrations). Reissner, Dresden 1928.
- 1929: Das Buch von Leipzig
- 1930: Das Buch von Frankfurt. Mainz/Wiesbaden
- 1931: Vergnügliches Handbuch der deutschen Sprache
- 1931: Sächsisch. Was nicht im Wörterbuch steht
- 1932: Quartett zu dritt, Novel
- 1933: Der wirkliche Knigge, Dresden, Reissner
- 1934: Frau ohne Herz. Theaterstück in 5 Bildern, Berlin, Dreiklang (under the pseudonym Andreas Zeltner)
- 1935: Mensch, mach dir's leicht! (2nd ed. of Der wirkliche Knigge), Dresden, Reissner
- 1935: Motorbummel durch den Orient, Berlin, Müller & Kiepenheuer
- 1935: Der Strohmann, Berlin, Dreiklang (Schwank)
- 1935: Ein Sonntagskind. Lustspiel-Operette in 7 Bildern, Berlin, Distribution Center and Publisher of German Stage Writers and Stage Composers (Music by Karlheinz Gutheim)
- 1936: Freut Euch des Lebens! (with Bruno Wellenkamp), publishing house Arbeitsfront (a revue for KdF)
- 1936: Das Buch vom Kitsch, München, Piper
- 1936: Die Reise nach Nizza
- 1937: Vergnügliches Handbuch der deutschen Sprache (3rd ed.), Munich, Piper
- 1937: Flocco
- 1939: Du, hör´ mal zu! Lustiges, Berlin, Siegismund
- 1939: Mit 100 Jahren noch ein Kind, Berlin, Schützen-Verlag
- 1939: Des Teufels Phiole. Ein utoparodistischer Roman, Berlin, Schützen-Verlag
- 1940: Der kleine Spaßvogel, Berlin, Curtius, 1940
- 1940: Der Tolpatsch. Lustspiel in 3 Akten nach dem Roman von Hans Ribau, (together with Viktor de Kowa), Berlin, Ahn & Simrock
- 1940: Du, hör' mal zu! Lustiges, Berlin, Siegismund (2nd ed.), in: Deutsche Soldatenbücherei, Vol. 4
- 1940: Herr Knurpel. Fachsimpeleien um eine schnurrige Figur, Leipzig, Wehnert & Co.
- 1940: Mit 100 Jahren noch ein Kind, Berlin, Schützen-Verlag (4th ed)
- 1940: Tamerlan, Ibach, Wien and others, Ibach (with R. A. Stemmle)
- 1940: Die Jagdhütte. Schwank, Berlin, Ahn & Simrock, 1940 (with G. V. Otten)
- 1941: Liebe und Gips, Berlin, Frommhagen
- 1941: Lachendes Feldgrau, Bremen, Burmester
- 1942: Vergnügliches Handbuch der deutschen Sprache, München, Piper (4th edition)
- 1942: Hast du Töne!, Berlin, Schützen-Verlag
- 1942: Herr Knurpel, Leipzig, Wehnert & Co. (11.-20. thousand)
- 1942: Motorbummel durch den Orient, Berlin, Arnold (new edition)
- 1942: Die kobaltblaue Tarnkappe, München, Braun & Schneider
- 1951: Hinter den Kulissen unserer Sprache, subtitle: Ein heiteres Kolleg
- 1956: Reimann reist nach Babylon, notes
- 1957: Der Mogelvogel, novel
- 1959: Mein blaues Wunder, autobiography

== Selected filmography ==
Screenwriter

- Such a Rascal (1934, based on the novel Die Feuerzangenbowle by Heinrich Spoerl)
- Kleiner Mann – ganz groß (1938, based on a play by Edgar Kahn and Ludwig Bender)
- Der Sündenbock (1940)

Actor

- One Hour of Happiness (1931), as Nachtwächter
- Storms of Passion (1932), as Max
- Scandal in Budapest (1933)
- Kleiner Mann – ganz groß (1938), as Emil Wurm

== Film adaptations ==
- The Scoundrel (1931, based on the play The Scoundrel)
- The Scoundrel (1939, based on the play The Scoundrel)
- The Domestic Tyrant (1959, based on the play The Scoundrel)
