= Toni Impekoven =

German actor and writer (1881–1947)

- Born: 21 June 1881; Cologne, Germany
- Died: 6 May 1947 (aged 65); Sprendlingen, Germany
- Occupations: Writer, actor

Toni Impekoven (21 June 1881 – 6 May 1947) was a German actor and writer. Impekoven was a popular playwright, who co-authored the hit comedy The Scoundrel with Hans Reimann. The play was turned into films on two occasions. He was the brother of Sabine Impekoven and the husband of Frieda Impekoven, with whom he had a daughter Niddy Impekoven.

== Selected filmography ==
- The Scoundrel (1931)
- The Court Concert (1936)
- The Scoundrel (1939)
- The Court Concert (1948)

== Bibliography ==
- Goble, Alan (1999). The Complete Index to Literary Sources in Film. Berlin: Walter de Gruyter. ISBN 978-3-11-095194-3.
