= Shared Parenting Day =

Defeating narratives and rhetorical stereotypes

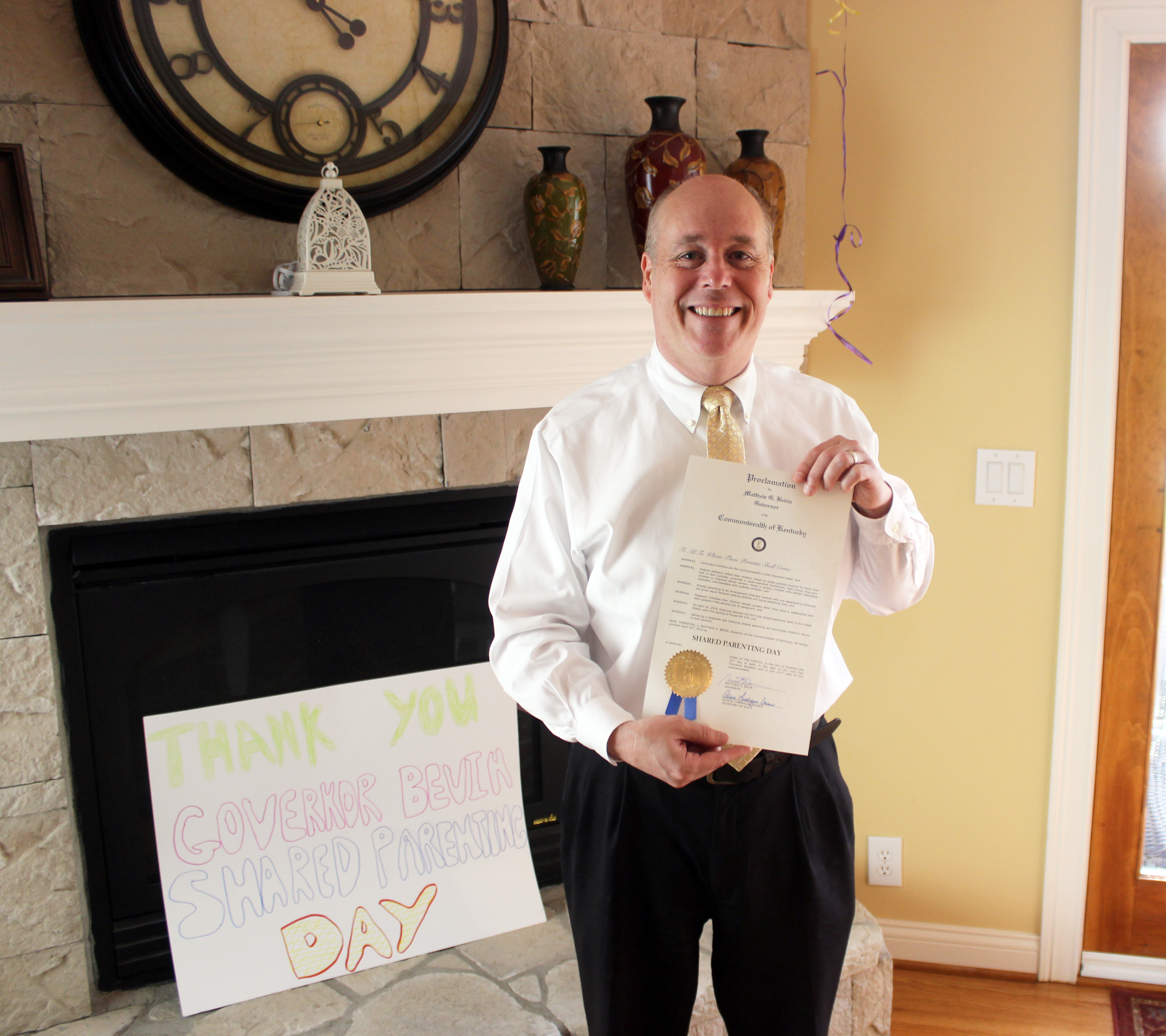
Matt Hale of National Parents Organization poses with the first Shared Parenting Day proclamation in 2019 in Kentucky.

Shared Parenting Day is an annual United States observance on April 26 in several states to promote the active involvement of both parents in raising their children following divorce or separation. The day was first established in Kentucky in 2019, coinciding with the state's landmark shared parenting legislation, and has since been recognized by other states.

== History ==
Shared Parenting Day was first observed in Kentucky in 2019, following the passage of Kentucky House Bill 528 (H.B. 528) in 2018. This groundbreaking law created a rebuttable presumption that equal shared parenting time and decision-making by both parents is in the child's best interest, making Kentucky the first state to pass such legislation. The observance of April 26th was chosen to commemorate the signing of this bill by Governor Matt Bevin on April 26, 2018. The initiative for Shared Parenting Day was led by Matt Hale, a board member of the National Parents Organization (NPO), who also designated yellow as the day's official color to symbolize family reunification.

== Recognition by other states ==
Following Kentucky's lead, Missouri became the second state to recognize Shared Parenting Day in 2020, with advocacy from Linda Reutzel of the National Parents Organization. Arizona and Massachusetts followed in 2021, and South Dakota in 2022. The city of El Paso, Texas, also observes the day, and in 2022, Maryland joined the list of states officially recognizing April 26th as Shared Parenting Day.

In 2023, Wisconsin proposed a resolution to proclaim Shared Parenting Day, though it did not pass. Despite this, the movement continues to grow, with advocates pushing for recognition in additional states. In 2025 Wisconsin passed SJR 24, officially recognizing April 26, 2025 as Shared Parenting Day in the state. in 2026, Wyoming passed SJ0006, naming April 26 Shared Parenting Day.

== Significance ==
Shared Parenting Day raises awareness about the benefits of shared parenting, emphasizing the importance of maintaining strong relationships between children and both parents post-separation. The day also advocates for legislative changes to make shared parenting the default in custody arrangements.
