= Kari Adamsons =

American psychologist

- Education: University of North Carolina at Greensboro
- Known for: Family theory, Fathering, Couple relationship
- Scientific career
- Workplaces: University of Connecticut
- Thesis: The Effect of Congruence of Mothers’ and Fathers’ Beliefs Regarding Fathering Roles on Father Involvement (2006)

Kari Adamsons is a professor and department head of human development and family sciences at the University of Connecticut. She is a nationally recognized expert on fathers, including father-child relationships, co-parenting, shared parenting and couple relationships. Adamsons is a co-author of Family Theories: An Introduction.

== Early life and education ==
As an undergraduate, Adamsons studied psychology, graduating in 1996 with a B.A. from College of William and Mary. Subsequently, she enrolled at the human development and family studies program at the University of North Carolina at Greensboro, obtaining first a master's degree in 2002 followed by a doctoral degree in 2006. After one year as a postdoctoral fellow she became a faculty member at the University of Connecticut in 2007.

== Scientific work ==
Adamsons is most known for her work on fathers and father-child relationships, especially during transition to fatherhood and during and after divorce or separation. She has shown that quality time with their non-custodial fathers is very important for the well-being of children whose parents have divorced. She has further concluded that it is not only the quality but also the quantity of time that matters.

Adamsons other important research areas include family theory, identity theory, bioecological theory and couple relationships.

== Selected publications ==
=== Books ===
- White JM, Martin TF, Adamsons K. Family theories: An introduction. Sage Publications, 3rd edition, 2018.

=== Scientific articles ===
- Adamsons K, Pasley K. Coparenting following divorce and relationship dissolution. Handbook of divorce and relationship dissolution. 2006:241-61.
- Adamsons K, Buehler C. Mothering versus fathering versus parenting: Measurement equivalence in parenting measures. Parenting: Science and Practice. 2007 Jul 30;7(3):271-303.
- Adamsons K, Pasley K. An ecological approach to father involvement in biological and stepfather families. Fathering. 2007 Mar 22;5(2):129-48.
- Adamsons K. Using identity theory to develop a midrange model of parental gatekeeping and parenting behavior. Journal of Family Theory & Review. 2010 Jun;2(2):137-48.
- Adamsons K, Johnson SK. An updated and expanded meta-analysis of nonresident fathering and child well-being. Journal of Family Psychology. 2013 Aug;27(4):589.
- Palkovitz R, Trask BS, Adamsons K. Essential differences in the meaning and processes of mothering and fathering: Family systems, feminist and qualitative perspectives. Journal of Family Theory & Review. 2014 Dec 1;6(4):406-20.
- Adamsons K. Quantity versus quality of nonresident father involvement: Deconstructing the argument that quantity doesn't matter. Journal of Child Custody. 2018 Jan 2;15(1):26-34.

=== Other ===
- Adamsons K. Commonalities and Diversities of Fathering - Overall Commentary on Fathering, Encyclopedia on Early Childhood Development, 2016.
