= Edward Kruk =

Sociologist

- Born: England
- Education: PhD, Social Policy and Social Work
- Alma mater: University of Toronto; University of Edinburgh
- Known for: Family Studies, Father-child relationships, Shared parenting
- Children: Stephan, Liam
- Awards: Queen Elizabeth II Diamond Jubilee Medal
- Scientific career
- Workplaces: University of British Columbia
- Thesis: Impact of divorce on non-custodial fathers: psychological and structural factors contributing to disengagement (1989)

Edward Kruk is a Canadian sociologist and social worker. He has conducted internationally recognized research on child custody, shared parenting, family mediation, divorced fathers, parental alienation, parental addiction, child protection, and grandparent access to their grandchildren. Kruk is an associate professor of social work at the University of British Columbia. He is the founding president of the International Council on Shared Parenting.

== Early life and education ==
Kruk was born in England. He graduated with a Bachelor of Arts degree in sociology and psychology at the University of Toronto. He continued his studies there, earning a master's degree in social work. He subsequently moved to Scotland, where he obtained a PhD in social policy and social work at the University of Edinburgh.

== Scientific work ==
=== Shared parenting ===
Kruk conducted research on shared parenting after divorce or separation, particularly highlighting the importance of the father's involvement to the children's well-being. He has studied the impact of family separation on estranged fathers. Kruk also researched children's reactions to shared parenting and the family court system.

Kruk has studied the effect of mothers who have lost custody rights. He noted that when court systems are accused of favoring mothers in the United States and Canada, the courts responded with an increased ratio of legal determinations of paternal custody as opposed to shared parenting. This places a mother's relationship with their children at serious risk. Taking an international perspective, Kruk has noted that the gender aspect of the shared parenting discussion is very different across the world. In countries like Iceland, shared parenting is seen by women as an important gender equality issue. In contrast, many women's organizations in Canada and the US are against shared parenting, with some going so far as to characterize it as a "fathers' rights conspiracy". In other countries, such as Turkey and Iran, shared parenting is seen by women as an important women's rights issue, as sole paternal custody is the current norm. Kruk has concluded that "the characterization of parental alienation and shared parenting as 'fathers' rights' issues has rendered invisible the plight of many mothers, and negatively affected the global campaign to establish shared parenting as the foundation of family law as a fundamental right of women and their children."

Kruk has also evaluated reasons for push-back against shared parenting. According to Kruk, there have been three waves of criticism against shared parenting as a legal presumption and the default custody arrangement. In the first wave, shared parenting was considered outlandish because children need one primary parental figure to bond with, child development suffers from frequent moves between two households, and one should not disrupt the "status quo". When scientific research disproved these assumptions, a second wave of criticism argued that shared parenting increases parental conflict and is only suitable for parents who get along well as co-parents. After research again disproved this claim, a third wave of criticism acknowledged that while shared parenting may be the best solution for most children, there should be no presumptions in custody proceedings, so that each judge can decide what arrangement is in the best interest of a child.

=== Grandparents and grandchildren ===
As part of his work on family mediation, Kruk determined that it was important for the children of divorced parents to have an active relationship with their grandparents. He concluded that grandparents "often play a vital role in helping grandchildren adjust to the consequences of parental divorce, providing a sanctuary for the emotional needs of their grandchildren at a time when parents, faced by the multiple losses and transitions attendant to divorce, maybe less emotionally available and responsive to their children."

=== Parental alienation ===
Kruk and colleagues have argued that parental alienation is similar to the historical, social, and political denial or other forms of abuse in many parts of the world, such as child abuse a century ago. They have defined it as a form of family violence. To prevent and overcome parental alienation, Kruk has argued for establishing shared parenting as the foundation of family law, effective legal enforcement parenting orders, professional recognition of parental alienation as a form of child abuse, and the provision of effective treatment programs and reunification services for alienated parents and their children.

== Public education and media ==
Kruk maintains a weblog on "Co-Parenting After Divorce" hosted by Psychology Today, covering a wide range of topics including co-parenting, family mediation, child custody, shared parenting, and parental alienation.

== Selected publications ==
=== Books ===
- Edward Kruk, Divorce and Disengagement: Patterns of Fatherhood Within and Beyond Marriage, Halifax: Fernwood Publishing, 1993.
- Edward Kruk, Mediation and Conflict Resolution in Social Work and the Human Services, Chicago: Nelson-Hall, 1997.
- Edward Kruk, Divorced Fathers: Children's Needs and Parental Responsibilities, Halifax: Fernwood Publishing, 2011.
- Edward Kruk, The Equal Parent Presumption: Social Justice in the Legal Determination of Parenting After Divorce, Montreal/Kingston: McGill-Queen's University Press, 2013.

=== Scientific articles ===
- Kruk E. "Psychological and structural factors contributing to the disengagement of noncustodial fathers after divorce". Family Court Review. 1992 Jan;30(1):81–101.
- Kruk E. "The disengaged noncustodial father: Implications for social work practice with the divorced family". Social work. 1994 Jan 1;39(1):15–25.
- Kruk E. "Grandparent visitation disputes: Multigenerational approaches to family mediation". Mediation Quarterly. 1994 Sep;12(1):37–53.
- Kruk E, Hall BL. "The disengagement of paternal grandparents subsequent to divorce". Journal of Divorce & Remarriage. 1995 Sep 7;23(1–2):131-48.
- Kruk E, "Collateral Damage: The Lived Experiences of Divorced Mothers Without Custody". Journal of Divorce and Remarriage, 2010:51,526-543.
- Kruk E. "A model equal parental responsibility presumption in contested child custody". The American Journal of Family Therapy. 2011 Oct 1;39(5):375-89.
- Kruk E. "Arguments for an equal parental responsibility presumption in contested child custody". The American Journal of Family Therapy. 2012 Jan 1;40(1):33–55.
- Kruk E. "The lived experiences of non-custodial parents in Canada: A comparison of mothers and fathers". International Journal for Family Research and Policy. 2015;1(1).
- Kruk E. "Arguments Against a Presumption of Shared Physical Custody in Family Law". Journal of Divorce & Remarriage. 2018 Jul 4;59(5):388–400.
- Harman JJ, Kruk E, Hines DA. "Parental alienating behaviors: An unacknowledged form of family violence". Psychological bulletin. 2018, 144:1275.

=== Popular press ===
- Edward Kruk, "Father Absence, Father Deficit, Father Hunger: The Vital Importance of Paternal Presence in Children's Lives", Psychology Today, 23 May 2012.
- Edward Kruk, "The Voices of Children of Divorce: Listening to the real experts on the 'best interests of the child'", Psychology Today, 12 November 2013.
- Edward Kruk, "Equal shared parenting — best for parents, best for children: The current adversarial system in family law is unsustainable", National Post, 25 March 2014.
- Edward Kruk, "What Exactly Is 'The Best Interest of the Child'?", Psychology Today, 22 February 2015.
- Edward Kruk, "Grandparents Affected by Adult Child Divorce: Responding to the trauma of grandparental alienation", Psychology Today, 15 March 2017.
- Edward Kruk, "Understanding Children's Best Interests in Divorce: Conclusions of the Third International Conference on Shared Parenting", Psychology Today, 26 June 2017.
- Edward Kruk, "Parental Alienation: What Is the Solution? A call to action to combat and eliminate parental alienation", Psychology Today, 16 November 2017.
- Edward Kruk, "Coparenting as a Women's Rights Issue: The hidden problem of maternal alienation from children's lives", Psychology Today, 24 February 2018.
- Edward Kruk, "On Father's Day, Remember the Alienated Father The forced estrangement of children is a form of collective abuse", Psychology Today, 15 June 2018.
- Edward Kruk, "The Forced Removal of Children from Parental Care: Parallels between two different forms of parental alienation", Psychology Today, 20 June 2018.
- Michel Grangeat, Edward Kruk, Malin Bergström, Sofia Marinho. "Are joint custody and shared parenting a child's right?", The Conversation, 4 October 2018.
- Edward Kruk, "Countering Arguments Against Shared Parenting in Family Law: Have we reached a tipping point in the child custody debate?", Psychology Today, 10 October 2018.
- Edward Kruk, "Parental Alienation as Child Abuse and Family Violence: A form of emotional aggression and intimate terrorism", Psychology Today, 10 January 2019.
