= Kentucky House Bill 528 =

2018 family law for equal shared parenting

Kentucky House Bill 528 (abbreviated H.B. 528) is a 2018 family law that created a rebuttable presumption that both parents' equal shared parenting time and equal parental decision-making are in the child's best interest. Signed by Governor Matt Bevin on April 26, 2018, it was the first such law for permanent child custody orders passed in the United States. A temporary order aided the law's passage of the shared parenting bill, House Bill 492, passed a year before. The law became a motivator for similar bills to be passed in other states.

== Background ==
The idea of the presumption law was initiated by the National Parents Organization's (NPO) board member Matt Hale. He spent nearly six years promoting the idea that both parents' equal shared parenting time and decision-making are in the child's best interest in temporary child custody orders. He advocated the concept through several meetings, speeches, and guest columns. Hale contacted Jason Petrie with the idea prior to Petrie's swearing-in. Next, he took the initial draft to Petrie, who became the House Judiciary vice-chair shortly before the bill was heard. The bill was nearly identical to those not passed in 2014, 2015, and 2016. Hale initiated those bills working with his local state representative David Osborne.

== Legislative process ==
The bill was heard by the House and Senate Judiciary Committees, both of whom forwarded the bill favorably. Hale and Ryan Schroeder, then Sociology department chair at the University of Louisville, were the sole non-lawmakers to testify on the law's behalf in both committees. The law was passed by a vote of 81–2 in the House of Representatives and unanimously 38–0 in the state Senate. It was signed by Governor Matt Bevin on April 26, 2018.

== Advocates and opponents ==
The effort to pass the law was primarily sponsored by Jason Petrie along with other co-sponsors, including Jason Nemes, David Osborne, Robert Mills, Kevin Bratcher, Jim DuPlessis, Joseph Fischer, Mark Hart, Kenny Imes, David Meade, Jason Nemes, and Walker Thomas. It was also supported by the African-American state Senator Reggie Thomas and Senator Gerald Neal.

Hale had previously also contacted Schroeder to support HB 492. Schroeder agreed to help with HB 492 and continued his support and relationship with Hale to help secure the passage of HB 528.

=== Reactions ===
The law proved popular with Kentucky Democrats and Republicans. According to polling in July 2018, shortly after the law took effect, Kentuckians, in general, approved of the law by a factor of approximately six to one. The polling showed the law was popular across all races and genders. It also appeared to affect the 2018 Kentucky elections benefiting lawmakers who sponsored or voted for the bill. Of the two legislators that voted against the bill, only one, Linda H. Belcher, had a contested election the same year, which she lost.

The law gained nationwide attention, with 22 other states considering similar laws the following year. Kentucky joined Alaska as the only two states with temporary order shared parenting rebuttable presumptions. The Oklahoma lawmaker, Mark Lawson, introduced HB 1276 while calling Kentucky's shared parenting law a motivator. Further, the Fathers Rights Movement designated it the greatest law ever.

== Content of the bill ==
The key change in the custody law is summarized in this passage from the text of the bill:

"There shall be a presumption, rebuttable by a preponderance of the evidence, that joint custody and equally shared parenting time is in the best interest of the child. If a deviation from equal parenting time is warranted, the court shall construct a parenting schedule that maximizes the time each parent or de facto custodian has with the child and is consistent with ensuring the child's welfare."

Under the law, judges must begin each custody case with the presumption that joint custody and equally shared parenting time are best for the children. Seeking to promote healthier family dynamics, the law defaults 50/50 custody arrangements in child custody disputes. This means that if the case is brought to the family law court, it will most likely begin with a 50/50 split of child custody, parenting privileges, and financial obligations. Judges can then consider other factors, such as whether either parent has a history of domestic violence, before deciding whether joint custody is appropriate. The law stipulates if a domestic violence order is being or has been entered against a parent by another parent or child, then the presumption of joint custody will not apply. It also amended the existing law of that time to allow parents who did not have visitation rights or fair parenting time to petition for reasonable visitation rights.

Factors of deviation from the shared parenting arrangement:

- The wishes of the parent(s) and the wishes of any de facto custodian of the child;
- The child's relationship with a de facto custodian;
- The wishes of the child, with due consideration to the influence a parent or de facto custodian, may have over the child's wishes;
- The motivation of the adults in the participation of the child custody proceedings;
- The current involvement of each parent in the life of the child;
- The physical and mental health of each parent;
- The level of cooperation between the parents;
- The child's adjustment and continued proximity to his/her home, school, or community;
- Any finding by the court that domestic violence or abuse has occurred.

== Shared Parenting Day ==
Upon the legal request of Hale, encouraged by Bevin, the Commonwealth proclaimed April 26 as "Shared Parenting Day" to honor shared parenting as a way to encourage children's access to both parents. Hale also chose yellow as the designated color of Shared Parenting Day by referencing the traditional use of yellow ribbons for family reunification. In 2020, at the request of the National Parents Organization's Linda Reutzel, Missouri became the second state to proclaim April 26 as Shared Parenting Day. In 2021, Arizona and Massachusetts followed suit. In 2022, the South Dakota legislature passed House Concurrent Resolution 6003, recognizing April 26 as Shared Parenting Day each year.
