= Single parent =

Parent raising a child alone

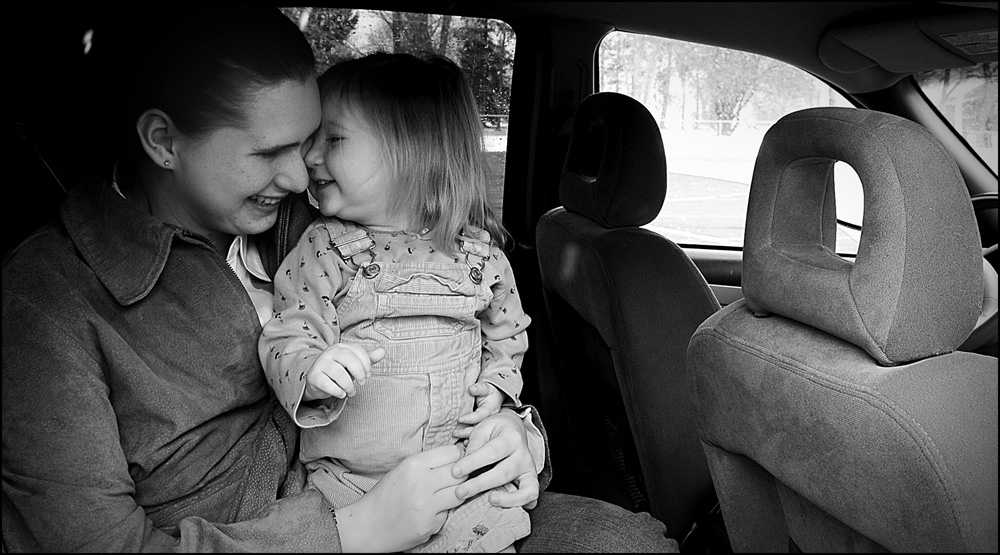
A single mother and child

A single parent is a person who has a child or children but does not have a spouse or live-in partner to assist in the upbringing or support of the child in household together. Reasons for becoming a single parent can include annulment, death, divorce, break-up, abandonment, domestic violence, rape, childbirth by a single person or single-person adoption. A single parent family is a family with children that is headed by a single parent.

== History ==
Single parenthood has been common historically due to parental mortality rate due to disease, wars, homicide, work accidents and maternal mortality. Historical estimates indicate that in French, English, or Spanish villages in the 17th and 18th centuries at least one-third of children lost one of their parents during childhood; in 19th-century Milan, about half of all children lost at least one parent by age 20; in 19th-century China, almost one-third of boys had lost one parent or both by the age of 15. Such single parenthood was often short in duration, since remarriage rates were high.

Divorce was generally rare historically (although this depends on culture and era), and became especially difficult to obtain after the fall of the Roman Empire, in Medieval Europe, due to strong involvement of ecclesiastical courts in family life (though annulment and other forms of separation were more common).

Single parent adoptions have existed since the mid 19th century. Men were rarely considered as adoptive parents, and were considered far less desired. Often, children adopted by a single person were raised in pairs rather than alone, and many adoptions by lesbians and gay men were arranged as single parent adoptions. During the mid 19th century many state welfare officials made it difficult if not impossible for single persons to adopt, as agencies searched for married heterosexual couples. In 1965, the Los Angeles Bureau of Adoptions sought single African-Americans for African-American orphans for whom married families could not be found. In 1968, the Child Welfare League of America stated that married couples were preferred, but there were "exceptional circumstances" where single parent adoptions were permissible.

== Demographics ==
=== Households ===
Among all households in OECD countries in 2011, the proportion of single-parent households was in 3-11% the range, with an average of 7.5%. It was highest in Australia (10%), Canada (10%), Mexico (10%), United States (10%), Lithuania (10%), Costa Rica (11%), Latvia (11%) and New Zealand (11%), while it was lowest in Japan (3%), Greece (4%), Switzerland (4%), Bulgaria (5%), Croatia (5%), Germany (5%), Italy (5%) and Cyprus (5%). The proportion was 9% in both Ireland and the United Kingdom.

Among households with children in 2005/09, the proportion of single-parent households was 10% in Japan, 16% in the Netherlands, 19% in Sweden, 20% in France, 22% in Denmark, 22% in Germany, 23% in Ireland, 25% in Canada, 25% in the United Kingdom, and 30% in the United States. The U.S. proportion increased from 20% in 1980 to 30% in 2008.

In all OECD countries, most single-parent households were headed by a mother. The proportion headed by a father varied between 9% and 25%. It was lowest in Estonia (9%), Costa Rica (10%), Cyprus (10%), Japan (10%), Ireland (10%) and the United Kingdom (12%), while it was highest in Norway (22%), Spain (23%), Sweden (24%), Romania (25%) and the United States (25%). These numbers were not provided for Canada, Australia or New Zealand.

=== Children ===
In 2016/17, the proportion of children living in a single-parent household varied between 6% and 28% in the different OECD countries, with an OECD country average of 17%. It was lowest in Turkey (2015, 6%), Greece (8%), Croatia (8%) and Poland (10%), while it was highest in France (23%), United Kingdom (23%), Belgium (25%), Lithuania (25%), United States (27%) and Latvia (28%). It was 19% in Ireland and Canada.

Among children living in a single-parent household, most live primarily with their mother, others primarily with their father, while other children have a shared parenting arrangement where they spend an approximately equal amount of time with their two parents. Among those living primarily with one single parent, most live with their mother. In 2016 (or latest year available), the proportion of 6-12 year olds living primarily with their single father ranged between 5% and 36% among the different OECD countries. It was highest in Belgium (17%), Iceland (19%), Slovenia (20%), France (22%), Norway (23%) and Sweden (36%), while it was lowest in Lithuania (4%), Ireland (5%), Poland (5%), Estonia (7%), Austria (7%) and the United Kingdom (8%). It was 15% in the United States.

In 2005/06, the proportion of 11- to 15-year-old children living in a shared parenting arrangement versus with only one of their parents varied between 1% and 17%, being the highest in Sweden. It was 5% in Ireland and the United States, and 7% in Canada and the United Kingdom. By 2016/17, the percentage in Sweden had increased to 28%.

== Impact on parents ==
Over 9.5 million American families are run by one woman. Single mothers are likely to have mental health issues, financial hardships, live in a low income area, and receive low levels of social support. All of these factors are taken into consideration when evaluating the mental health of single mothers. The occurrence of moderate to severe mental disability was more pronounced among single mothers at 28.7% compared to partnered mothers at 15.7%. These mental disabilities include but are not limited to anxiety and depression. Financial hardships also affect the mental health of single mothers. Women, ages 15–24, were more likely to live in a low socio-economic area, have one child, and not to have completed their senior year of high school. These women reported to be in the two lowest income areas, and their mental health was much poorer than those in higher income areas.

A similar study on the mental health of single mothers attempted to answer the question, "Are there differences in the prevalence of psychiatric disorders, between married, never-married, and separated/divorced mothers?" Statistically, never married, and separated/divorced mothers had the highest regularities of drug abuse, personality disorder and PTSD. The family structure can become a trigger for mental health issues in single mothers. They are especially at risk for having higher levels of depressive symptoms.

Studies from the 1970s showed that single mothers who are not financially stable are more likely to experience depression. In a more current study it was proven that financial strain was directly correlated with high levels of depression. Among low-income single mothers, depressive symptoms may be as high as 60%.

Inadequate access to mental health care services is prevalent amongst impoverished women. Low-income women are less likely to receive mental health care for numerous reasons. Mental health services remain inequitable for low-income, more so, low-income single women are more likely to have depression, anxiety, and other poor mental health outcomes. Researchers Copeland and Snyder (2011) addressed the barriers low-income single mothers have on receiving mental health care, "Visible barriers often include the lack of community resources, transportation, child care, convenient hours, and financial resources." Meanwhile, low-income single mothers are more likely to bring their children in for mental health treatment than themselves. Researchers Copeland and Snyder analyzed sixty-four African American mothers who brought their children in for mental health treatment. These mothers were then screened for mild, moderate, and severe depression and/or anxiety. After three months the researchers used an ethnographic interview to address whether or not the participants used mental health services that were referred to them. Results indicated that the majority of the participants did not use the referred mental health care services for reasons that included: fear of losing their children, being hospitalized and/or stigmatized by their community counterparts.

== Impact on children ==
According to David Blankenhorn, Patrick Fagan, Mitch Pearlstein David Popenoe and Barbara Dafoe Whitehead, living in a single parent family is strongly correlated with school failure and problems of delinquency, drug use, teenage pregnancies, poverty, and welfare dependency in the United States. Using multilevel modelling, Suet-Ling Pong has shown that a high proportion of American children from single parent families perform poorly on mathematics and reading achievement tests.

In Sweden, Emma Fransson et al. have shown that children living with one single parent have worse well-being in terms of physical health behavior, mental health, peer friendships, bullying, cultural activities, sports, and family relationships, compared to children from intact families. As a contrast, children in a shared parenting arrangement that live approximately equal amount of time with their divorced mother and father have about the same well-being as children from intact families and better outcomes than children with only one custodial parent.

The United Kingdom Office for National Statistics has reported that children of single parents, after controlling for other variables like family income, are more likely to have problems, including being twice as likely to have mental illness. Both British and American researchers show that children with no fathers are three times more likely to be unhappy, and are also more likely to engage in anti-social behavior, abuse substances and engage in juvenile deliquency.

=== Widowed parents ===
Historically, death of a partner was a frequent reason someone brought up their child singly. War and diseases deprived significant numbers of families of a parent. Improvements in sanitation and maternal care have decreased mortality for those of reproductive age, making death a less common occurrence.

=== Divorced parents ===
Child custody in reference to divorce refers to which parent is allowed to make important decisions about the children involved. Physical custody refers to which parent the child lives with. Among divorced parents, "parallel parenting" refers to parenting after divorce in which each parent does so independently; this is cited as being the most common. This American book, cites that 'cooperative parenting,' which occurs when the parents involved in the child's life 'work together' around all involved parties' schedules and activities, is far less common. It suggests 'after a "crisis period," most children resume 'normal development' however, their relationships are 'affected,' as they lack a model.' It also concluded that 'adult children of divorcees cope better with change.'

Some studies have concluded that 'keeping in touch' with both parents and having a 'healthy relationship' with two parents, has a positive effect on a child's behavior; which leads to an easier time coping with divorce. These studies also concluded that children do 'better' if they have a 'smooth adjustment period.' One way to make this adjustment easier,is given as "remaining in the same neighborhoods and schools following divorce."

=== Marriage ===
Some societies believe that couples should be married prior to starting a family. Some believe that a partner may leave as they do not want the responsibilities of bringing up a child, and that being married makes this less likely. Where they are not acceptable, they sometimes result in forced marriage, however such marriages fail more often than others.

Previously, in the United States, a book by Sarah Brown states that the rate of unintended pregnancy is higher among unmarried couples than among married ones. 'In 1990, 73% of births to unmarried women were unintended at the time of conception, compared to about 57% of births overall.' (1987 data).

Sarah Brown concludes that 'Mothers with unintended pregnancies, and their children, are subject to numerous adverse health effects, including increased risk of violence and death, and the children are less likely to succeed in school and are more likely to live in poverty and be involved in crime.'

The American book about "Fragile families" from 1990, also concludes '...unintended pregnancy out of wedlock. Usually in this situation the father is not completely in the picture and the relationship between the mother, father, and child is consistently unstable. As well as instability, "fragile families" are often limited in resources such as human capital and money. The kids that come from these families are more likely to be hindered within school and don't succeed.' as well as kids who have strictly single parents or two parent homes. It also states that 'usually within these families the father plans to stick around and help raise the child, but once the child is born the father does not stay for much longer, and only one third stay after five years of the child's birth.' ' Most of these "fragile families" come from low economic status to begin with and the cycle appears to continue; once the child grows up they are just as likely to still be poor.' 'Most fragile families end with the mother becoming a single parent, leaving it even more difficult to come out of the poverty cycle. The gender of the baby seems to have no effect if the father is not living with the mother at the time of the birth, meaning they are still likely to leave after one year of the child's birth. Yet there is some evidence that suggests that if the father is living with the mother at the time of the birth he is more likely to stay after one year if the child is a son rather than a daughter.'

=== Miscellaneous ===
There are multitudes of reasons for wanting to have or raise a child singly, or for carrying on raising a child singly.

=== Choice ===
Some women use artificial insemination to become single mothers by choice. Others choose to adopt. Men may also choose to become single fathers through adoption or surrogacy.

=== Adoption ===
Single parent adoptions are currently preferred over divorcees, as divorced parents are considered an unnecessary stress on the child. In one study, the interviewers asked children questions about their new lifestyle in a single-parent home. The interviewer found that when asked about fears, a high proportion of children feared illness or injury to the parent. When asked about happiness, half of the children talked about outings with their single adoptive parent. A single person wanting to adopt a child has to be mindful of the challenges they may face, and there are certain agencies that will not work with single adoptive parents at all. Single parents will typically only have their own income to live off of, and thus might not have a backup plan for potential children in case something happens to them. Traveling is also made more complex, as the child must either be left in someone else's care, or taken along.

== By country ==
=== Australia ===
In 2003, 14% of all Australian households were single-parent families. In Australia 2011, out of all families 15.9% were single parent families. Out of these families 17.6% of the single parents were males, whilst 82.4% were females.

Single people are eligible to apply for adoption in all states of Australia, except for Queensland and South Australia. They are able to apply for adoption both to Australian born and international born children, although not many other countries allow single parent adoptions.

Single parents in Australia are eligible for support payments from the government, but only if they are caring for at least one child under the age of eight.

=== India ===
The Supreme Court of India and various High Courts of India have recognized the rights of single mothers to give birth and raise children. The High Court of Kerala, has declared in a case argued by Advocate Aruna A. that, the birth registration authorities cannot insist on the details of the father for registration of birth of a child born to a single mother, conceived through IVF. The Delhi High Court has held that "mother’s name is sufficient in certain cases like the present one to apply for passport, especially as a single woman can be a natural guardian and also a parent". Considering these socio-legal transformations, a study suggested that despite facing numerous challenges, single mothers who are raising their children with little support from the families, society or state are challenging the dominant male breadwinner and provider model while redefining the heteronormative model of parenting.

=== New Zealand ===
At the 2013 census, 17.8% of New Zealand families were single-parent, of which five-sixths were headed by a female. Single-parent families in New Zealand have fewer children than two-parent families; 56% of single-parent families have only one child and 29% have two children, compared to 38% and 40% respectively for two-parent families.

=== Sierra Leone ===
In Sierra Leone, a 1994 study observed that it was socially acceptable for unmarried single Mende women to have children due to the social stigma of being a woman with no children.

=== South Africa ===
In South Africa, the number of single-parent households has risen in the twentieth and twenty-first centuries due to a variety of factors, including the HIV/AIDs epidemic, increasing economic migration within the country, and the social changes brought about by colonialism and apartheid. As of 2012, 39% of children living in South Africa lived with their biological mother and not their father, and 4% lived with their biological father but not their mother. In South African academic literature, single mothers are studied as a part of the "female headed household" demographic. Colloquially, the term "single-parent household" or "single mother" is more widely used. The perception of single mothers within South African society varies depending on the cause of their situation. Women whose husbands died are not typically judged in the same way as divorced, separated, or unmarried women. Within South African media, the idea that unmarried women may seek to become pregnant in order to access child benefits is a common one. To avoid social stigma, the families of unmarried women with children will often raise the child(ren) as their own. It is especially common for the child to be raised as a sibling of their mother. However, this is not the case when the child has a disability. A 2023 study found that South African women who gave birth to children with disabilities were often rejected and left by their partners, their partner's family, and their own family. This is due to stigma disabilities have carried in South African society and the blame placed upon the women for having a child with a disability.

=== United Kingdom ===
In the United Kingdom, about 1 out of 4 families with dependent children are single-parent families, 8 to 11 percent of which have a male single-parent. UK poverty figures show that 52% of single parent families are below the Government-defined poverty line (after housing costs). Single parents in the UK are almost twice as likely to be in low-paid jobs as other workers (39% of working single parents compared with 21% of working people nationally). This is highlighted in a report published by Gingerbread, funded by Trust for London and Barrow Cadbury Trust.

=== United States ===

In the United States, since the 1960s, there has been a marked increase in the number of children living with a single parent. The jump was caused by an increase in births to unmarried women and by the increasing prevalence of divorces among couples. In 2010, 40.7% of births in the US were to unmarried women; since then the figure has remained largely unchanged; in 2024, 39.5% of births were to unmarried women. In 2000, 11% of children were living with parents who had never been married, 15.6% of children lived with a divorced parent, and 1.2% lived with a parent who was widowed. The results of the 2010 United States census showed that 27% of children live with one parent, consistent with the emerging trend noted in 2000. The most recent data of December 2011 shows approximately 13.7 million single parents in the U.S. Mississippi leads the nation with the highest percent of births to unmarried mothers with 54% in 2014, followed by Louisiana, New Mexico, Florida and South Carolina.

In 2006, 12.9 million families in the US were headed by a single parent, 80% of which were headed by a woman. Single-parent households are on average much poorer, a pattern largely explained by the lack of a second source of income in the home itself.

According to a 2016 report from the United States Census Bureau, the percentage of children living in families with two parents decreased from 88 to 69 between 1960 and 2016. Of those 50.7 million children living in families with two parents, 47.7 million live with two married parents and 3.0 million live with two unmarried parents. The percentage of children living with single parents increased substantially in the United States during the second half of the 20th century. According to a 2013 Child Trends study, only 9% of children lived with single parents in the 1960s—a figure that increased to 28% in 2012. Single parent households became more common after legislation allowing no fault divorce.

=== Zimbabwe ===
Historically Zimbabwe has had a tradition of polygamy, and so a second or third wife might run a household and take care of their children as a lone parent. In contrast to Western societies, financial support for single parents (especially single mothers) typically comes from extended family support systems.

== See also ==
- Single parents in UK Parliaments
- Cost of raising a child
- Family planning
- Marriage gap
- Single person
- Sole custody
