= Children's Rights Council =

U.S. nonprofit organization

- Abbreviation: CRC
- Formation: 1985
- Type: 501(c)(3) non-profit organization
- Purpose: shared parenting, child abuse, education, parenting access centers
- Headquarters: Prince George's County, Maryland
- Key people: E. F. Michael Morgan, president
- Website: crckids.org

The Children's Rights Council (CRC) is a non-profit organization dedicated to help divorced, separated and never married parents to remain active in their child’s life. The organization focuses on children’s rights advocacy for shared parenting, the prevention of child abuse and alternative dispute resolution. CRC also run parental access centers where children can spend supervised time with their non-custodial parents and where transfers between parents can occur in a monitored environment. The organization was founded in 1985 by David L Levy, and it is headquartered in Landover, Maryland, in the Washington, D.C. metropolitan area.

== Activities ==
CRC promotes legislation that works to benefit children through shared parenting. Seeking legislative reform, the organization advocates joint physical custody. CRC also manages 26 Child Access Centers in 11 different states which provide supervised access and visitation of children and serve as safe transfer points for children who are moving from the custody of one parent to another.

In addition, CRC conducts research and submits testimony to Congress in regard to the well being of children. The organization's primary focus is to minimize the emotional, physical and economic abuse, neglect and distress of children and the development of at-risk behaviors following relationship breakups between separated, divorce, or never-married parents who are highly conflicted. In 1995, Cynthia L. Ewing testified as a Legal Analyst for CRC that states which had the most "intact" families had, for the most part, the highest rankings of children's wellness.

== Goals ==
In support of this commitment to children, CRC has established a set of social goals based on program utilization of the Both Parents Approach model to help highly conflicted parents better cooperate and collaborate in the best interests of their children following break-up of the family. CRC's advocacy and program goals are designed to accomplish the following:

Mitigate the long-term damaging effects to children caused by divorce and relationship break-ups; Reduce total children at risk from developing harmful and destructive behaviors; Encourage non-custodial parents to remain emotionally & financially supportive of their child(ren); Advocate increased opportunities for access to non-custodial parents; and Decrease the nature, burden and expense of legal disputes and court interventions caused by persistent parental conflict.

== Media ==
On November 3, 2008, Children's Rights Council was mentioned in Abigail Van Buren's “Dear Abby” column, which runs in 1,400 newspapers. The article was entitled "Man Pestered by Ex-Wife Must Act to Help his Son", and CRC was referenced as an effective resource for parental alienation problems.

== Acknowledgments ==
- Designated "Best in America" by the Independent Charities of America
- 2006 "Non-Profit Intern Provider of the Year" by The Washington Center
- "Lifelong Achievement Award" Presented to President David L. Levy by US Office of Child Support Enforcement
- "Legislative Achievement Award" from First Lady Hillary Clinton
- "Distinguished Service to Children" presented by Parents Without Partners International

== See also ==
- Child custody
- Children's rights
- National Parents Organization
- Shared parenting
- Visitation
