= David L. Levy =

American lawyer

David Lawrence Levy (November 7, 1936 – December 11, 2014) was a children's rights activist. The National Partnership for Community Leadership (NPCL) presented Levy with the 2011 Charles Ballard Advocacy Award at NPCL's conference in Washington, D.C.

In 1985, Levy co-founded The National Council for Children's Rights, renamed The Children's Rights Council in 1992. Levy served as Board President until October 2009. He was the CEO from its inception until he became Board President on July 25, 2008. CRC is a global non-profit organization dedicated to protecting a child's right to have two parents and an extended family, regardless of the parents' marital status. Levy is President emeritus of CRC. He published Revolt of the Animals, a fantasy novel, in 2010, and has completed a book entitled Child in the Middle, which, though unpublished, has been cited with Levy's permission by authors of other books, including a book by Dr. Ron Mincy of Columbia University, an authority on research affecting never-married parents and their children.

Levy has completed another book, Viktor IV, about a modern artist who lived on a houseboat in the Amstel River in Holland from 1961-86. Levy knew Viktor IV when they were both students at the university of Florida. Levy has authored four books, all on different topics, fiction and non-fiction.

Levy is co-director of the Children's Rights Fund for Maryland, an organization advocating joint custody (shared parenting) for children of separation, divorce, and never-married parents. The Fund also provides low cost attorneys for parents in need affected by custody and access (visitation) issues.

Levy was appointed by Maryland Governor Martin O'Malley to the Child Custody Decision-Making Commission in the Fall of 2013. The Commission has held hearings around the state, and is now working on legislative proposals to be presented to the 2015 Maryland legislature. Levy also provides supervised visitations in the Washington, D.C. area and consults on custody related topics in the U.S. and abroad. He also provides job shadowing to help prepare young people for careers and jobs.

== Early life ==
A native of Yonkers, New York, Levy attended the University of Florida where he received a Bachelor of Arts degree in 1958 prior to matriculating to the University of Florida Law School from which he received his Juris Doctor in 1961. He spent a year in Israel (1969–1970), and upon his return to the U.S., he wrote freelance articles for The Washington Post and other publications.

== Career ==
As President of the CRC, Levy directed the Board of Trustees to strengthen families and reduce the trauma of divorce to children through supporting legislation and programs which favor Shared Parenting (joint custody) mediation, liberal access/parenting time, and emotional and financial child support. Levy edited CRC's quarterly newsletter, Children. Levy was responsible for CRC's 16 national conferences that attracted judges, lawyers, researchers, educators, elected officials, and custody reform activists. Levy also helped to guide the organization's access and visitation centers that provide neutral drop off and pick-up of children and supervised access (visitation). The flagship parenting time centers are in Prince George's County, Maryland, with a grant provided by the Prince George's County Circuit Court.

== Honors and achievements ==
Levy was named one of the "25 Most Influential People in our Children's Lives" in the October 2009 issue of Children's Health. Others named in the article include Sasha and Malia Obama, Arne Duncan, Melinda Gates, and SpongeBob SquarePants. Levy is quoted in the article as stating "The trend is slowly moving in our direction--President Obama talks a lot about absentee fathers who need to take responsibility. (But) he may not realize that there are millions of parents who want to be involved (in their children's lives), but the road is blocked."

Levy had an article published entitled "Lending a Hand One Child at a Time: The Children's Rights Council's Child access and Transfer Centers" in The American Journal of Family Therapy Levy received a "Lifelong Achievement Award" for his "untiring efforts on behalf of the Children of America" from the National Child Support Office in September 2000. Levy and CRC received the 1996 Distinguished Service to Children award from Parents without Partners International, and the 1996 Legislative Achievement award from the National Parents' Day Coalition. In 1989, Levy received the Prince George's County Civic Association award for convincing Prince's George County, Maryland, to hire the first access (visitation) mediator east of Michigan.

Levy has written several articles on the subject of child custody and divorce mediation which have been published in prominent legal journals as well as noted in general interest publications. He edited the CRC book The Best Parent is Both Parents, (1994). He also authored the novel The Potomac Conspiracy (1976). Among his professional affiliations, Levy was admitted to the Washington, D.C. Bar and the United States Supreme Court Bar. He was a board member of the Supervised Visitation Network and Stepfamily Association of America. Active in community affairs, Levy was the Social Action Vice President of the Tifereth Israel Congregation, Washington, D.C. He served as President of the Beth Torah Congregation from 1984 through 1986 during which time he was responsible for implementing a fundraising drive which turned the financially imperiled congregation into a financially viable organization (1985).

== Death ==
Levy died on December 11, 2014, at the age of 78.
