= Hildegund Sünderhauf =

German professor

- Education: Dr. jur.
- Alma mater: University of Konstanz
- Known for: Shared parenting
- Scientific career
- Institutions: Lutheran University of Applied Sciences Nuremberg
- Thesis: (1997)
- Doctoral advisors: Ekkehart Stein

Hildegund Sünderhauf-Kravets is a family law professor at the Lutheran University of Applied Sciences Nuremberg in Germany. She is published in the area of child custody and has authored a book on the topic of shared parenting.

== Education and career ==
Sünderhauf studied philosophy, political science and law at the University of Konstanz in Germany, obtaining her first law degree in 1992 and her second degree in 1995. She then worked as a research assistant for professor Ekkehart Stein, writing her dissertation in 1997. For the following three years she worked as a practicing family law attorney. In 2000, she became professor at the Lutheran University of Applied Sciences Nuremberg.

== Scientific work ==
In 2013 Sünderhauf has authored the first German language book on shared parenting, which is called the Wechselmodell (exchange model) in German. The book covers the psychology, law and best practices of shared parenting. She has also published research on parental responsibility, foster care, guardianship, adoption and mediation.

== Organizational service ==
Sünderhauf is a board member of the International Council on Shared Parenting and she was a joint chair for the organization's International Conference on Shared Parenting, which was held in 2014 in Bonn, Germany, during which she participated in a panel discussion in favor of shared parenting as the default custody arrangement after divorce.

== Media interviews and attention ==
On the topic of shared parenting, Sünderhauf has been interviewed or cited by many of the leading publications in Germany, including Bild, Die Zeit, Süddeutsche Zeitung, and the Hamburger Abendblatt.

== Selected publications ==
=== Books ===
- Sünderhauf H. Mediation bei der außergerichtlichen Lösung von Umweltkonflikten in Deutschland. Rhombos-Verlag, 1997.
- Sünderhauf H. Wechselmodell: Psychologie–Recht–Praxis: Abwechselnde Kinderbetreuung durch Eltern nach Trennung und Scheidung. Springer-Verlag, 2013.

=== Scientific articles ===
- Sünderhauf H. Reform in der Amtsvormundschaft. Zeitschrift des Deutschen Juristinnenbundes. 2010;13:114-117.
- Sünderhauf H. Aus dem "Fall Kevin" lernen: Aktuelle Änderungen im Recht der Amtsvormundschaft. Das Jugendamt, Fachzeitschrift für Jugendhilfe und Familienrecht. 2010:405-414.
- Sünderhauf H. Vorurteile gegen das Wechselmodell: Was stimmt, was nicht. Argumente in der Rechtsprechung und Erkenntnisse aus der psychologischen Forschung. FamRB. 2013;9.
- Sünderhauf H. Wechselmodell für alle?. Zeitschrift für Konfliktmanagement. 2017, 20:129-134.
