= Ned Holstein =

Physician and children's rights advocate

- Education: B.S., M.D.
- Alma mater: Harvard University, Mt. Sinai School of Medicine
- Occupation: Physician
- Organization: National Parents Organization
- Known for: Children's rights, Shared parenting
- Children: 3

Edwin C. "Ned" Holstein is an American physician and children's rights advocate. He is a founder and chairman of the National Parents Organization, and an advocate for shared parenting as being in the best interest of most children after separation or divorce.

== Education and medical career ==
Holstein holds a bachelor's degree from Harvard College, a master's degree in psychology from the Massachusetts Institute of Technology and an M.D. degree from Mount Sinai School of Medicine (1971). He did his residency in internal medicine at Boston City Hospital and a fellowship in preventive medicine at Mount Sinai School of Medicine from 1976 to 1978.

Holstein is board certified in internal medicine, preventive medicine and occupational medicine. He practices occupational medicine in Newton, Massachusetts. In addition to his clinical work, he has conducted environmental health research, studying e.g. the carcinogenic effects of asbestos, public health responses to asbestos exposure, liver function among dairy farmers, and techniques for measuring polybrominated biphenyl exposure.

== Organizational service ==
In 1998, Holstein founded the National Parents Organization, an organization that promotes shared parenting after separation or divorce. He is the chairman of the board and he has at times also served as the national executive director.

He also serves on the board of directors for the International Council on Shared Parenting. In May 2017, he organized and hosted the Third International Conference on Shared Parenting in Boston.

== Shared parenting advocacy ==
Holstein bases his advocacy for shared parenting on scientific studies from around the world. This research has shown that children with a shared parenting arrangement perform better on a variety of physical health, mental health and social relationship metrics, compared to children in sole custody.

== Media coverage ==
Holstein has been interviewed and quoted by various media outlets, including:

- Marilyn Gardner, When equal custody is law, who gains?, Christian Science Monitor, June 24, 2004.
- Susanna Schrobsdorff, Divorce: The New Rules of Child Custody, Newsweek, December 14, 2008.
- Jennifer Ludden, Push To Change Custody Laws: What's Best For Kids?, Morning Edition, National Public Radio, February 26, 2014.
- Mandy Oaklander, This Divorce Arrangement Stresses Kids Out Most, Time Magazine, April 27, 2015.
- Dugan Arnett, In Massachusetts and elsewhere, a push for custody reform, Boston Globe, August 1, 2015.
- Gail Rosenblum, New research supports shared custody for children in divorce, Minnesota Star Tribune, September 3, 2017.
- Jayne O'Donnell, Sierra Lewter, Fatherlessness is harder on Father's Day, but 'father figures,' other role models fill in, USA Today, June 15, 2018.
- s of children of divorce, Maryland Reporter, January 18, 2018.

== See also ==
- Joint custody (United States)
- Shared parenting
