= Malin Bergström =

Child psychologist

- Education: PhD
- Alma mater: Karolinska Institute
- Known for: Child psychology, Child custody
- Children: Manne, Hugo, Hampus, Majken
- Scientific career
- Institutions: Karolinska Institute, Stockholm University
- Thesis: Psychoprophylaxis - Antenatal preparation and actual use during labour (2010)
- Doctoral advisors: Ulla Waldenström, Helle Kieler

Malin Bergström is a child psychologist and scientist at the Karolinska Institute in Stockholm, Sweden. She is a specialist in studies concerning the effect on children with different child custody arrangements after divorce or separation. Using cross-sectional and longitudinal study designs, her research group has shown that children have better physical, mental and social outcomes if they live in a shared parenting arrangement compared to primarily living with only one parent.

== Scientific activities ==
For her PhD thesis, Bergström conducted a group randomized trial concerning psychoprophylaxis during child birth, evaluating the use by both the mothers and the fathers.

In 2011, Bergström started to work on the Elvis project at the Center for Health Equity Studies, a joint venture of Stockholm University and the Karolinska Institute. This project is a longitudinal research study that follows the health and well-being of children after their parents have divorced or separated. With Sweden as one of the early adopters of shared parenting, the project is unique in its ability to evaluate and compare long-term effects of different custody arrangements. In her various publications, Bergström has shown that children have better physical, mental and social outcomes if they live in a shared parenting arrangement, with approximately equal time with their mother and father compare with a primary parenting arrangement. This holds true for children of different ages, and whether or not their divorced parents have an amicable or high-conflict relationship.

Bergström serves as a board member of the International Council on Shared Parenting.

== Media ==
Bergström's research has received international media attention by for example Time Magazine, Yahoo Parenting, Radio Canada, and Science Daily.

== Selected publications ==
=== Peer-reviewed scientific articles ===
- Bergström M. Kieler H. Waldenström U. Effects of natural childbirth preparation versus standard antenatal education on epidural rates, experience of childbirth and parental stress in mothers and fathers: a randomised controlled multicentre trial. BJOG: An International Journal of Obstetrics & Gynaecology. 2009, 116:1167-1176.
- Bergström M. Kieler H. Waldenström U. Psychoprophylaxis during labor: Associations with labor-related outcomes and experience of childbirth. Acta Obstet Gynecol Scand. 2010, 89:794-800.
- Bergström M, Modin B, Fransson E, Rajmil L, Berlin M, Gustafsson PA, Hjern A. Living in two homes-a Swedish national survey of wellbeing in 12 and 15 year olds with joint physical custody. BMC Public Health. 2013, 13:868.
- Bergström M. Depressive symptoms in new first‐time fathers: Associations with age, sociodemographic characteristics, and antenatal psychological well‐being. Birth. 2013, 40:32-38.
- Bergström M, Fransson E, Hjern A, Köhler L, Wallby T. Mental health in Swedish children living in joint physical custody and their parents' life satisfaction: A cross‐sectional study. Scandinavian journal of psychology, 2014, 55,433-439.
- Bergström M, Fransson E, Modin B, Berlin M, Gustafsson PA, Hjern A. Fifty moves a year: is there an association between joint physical custody and psychosomatic problems in children? Journal of Epidemiology and Community Health. 2015.
- Fransson E, Sarkadi A, Hjern A, Bergström M. Why should they live more with one of us when they are children to us both?: Parents' motives for practicing equal joint physical custody for children aged 0–4. Children and youth services review. 2016, 66:154-160.
- Turunen J, Fransson E, Bergström M. Self-esteem in children in joint physical custody and other living arrangements. Public Health. 2017, 149:106-112.
- Fransson E, Hjern A, Bergström M. What Can We Say Regarding Shared Parenting Arrangements for Swedish Children?, Journal of Divorce & Remarriage, 2018, 59,349-358.
- Bergström M, Fransson E, Wells MB, Köhler L, Hjern A. Children with two homes: Psychological problems in relation to living arrangements in Nordic 2- to 9-year-olds. Scandinavian Journal of Public Health, 2018.
- Bergström M, Fransson E, Fabian H, Hjern A, Sarkadi A, Salari R. Preschool children living in joint physical custody arrangements show less psychological symptoms than those living mostly or only with one parent. Acta Paediatrica. 2018, 107:294-300.

=== Popular press ===
- Michel Grangeat, Edward Kruk, Malin Bergström, Sofia Marinho. Are joint custody and shared parenting a child’s right?, The Conversation, 4 oktober 2018.

=== Books (in Swedish) ===
- Bergström M. Lyhört föräldraskap (Responsive parenting), Bonnier Fakta, 2013.
- Bergström M. Fråga barnpsykologen – 142 frågor och svar om att vara förälder (Ask the child psychologist - 142 questions and answers about being a parent), Bonnier, 2018.
- Bergström M. Att skiljas med barn (Getting divorced with children), Bonnier Fakta, 2018.
