= Donald Hubin =

American philosopher

- Education: Ph.D.
- Alma mater: University of Arizona
- Known for: Ethics, Philosophy of law, Paternity
- Scientific career
- Institutions: Ohio State University
- Thesis: (1978)

Donald Clayton Hubin is an American philosopher, specializing in ethics, legal philosophy and political philosophy. He has published research on justice and future generations, parental rights, paternity, instrumental rationality and benefit-cost analysis, among other topics. Hubin is a professor emeritus in the Department of Philosophy at Ohio State University and the Founding Director Emeritus of its Center for Ethics and Human Values. He serves as the Chair of the national board of National Parents Organization.

== Education ==
In 1972, Hubin graduated with a B.A. from the University of California at Davis. He received both his M.A. and Ph.D. degrees from the University of Arizona, in 1976 and 1978 respectively.

== Scholarly work ==
=== Justice and ethics ===
As a researcher in moral philosophy, Hubin has written on the scope and nature of justice when there are conflicts between two entities. He contrasts the fundamental differences when two person have legitimate claims to the same goods or service versus the conflict between white blood cells and an invading virus, providing other in between examples such as conflicts within a family or problems between non-overlapping generations. He has also written on the topic of justice for future generations.

=== Religion and ethics ===
As part of a book titled Is Goodness without God Good Enough?: A Debate on Faith, Secularism, and Ethics, Hubin was one of seven prominent philosophers asked to write an essay commenting on a debate between Paul Kurtz and William Lane Craig. In his essay, Hubin defends the worthiness of self-sacrifices in a world without a God. In 2015, Hubin participated in a Veritas Forum debate on miracles with MIT nuclear physicist Ian Hutchinson, where Hubin took the atheist perspective versus the religious beliefs of Hutchinson.

=== Fatherhood and paternity ===
Hubin wrote the Fatherhood entry in the International Encyclopedia of Ethics. He has also written on parental rights and due process; on untangling the puzzles of paternity; on elements of stereotypical fatherhood; on procreation and sexual asymmetries, and on reproductive interests.

== Shared parenting advocacy ==
In addition to his scholarly work, Hubin has actively worked to promote shared parenting after divorce as being in the best interest of children. Together with two colleagues, he put together a 2018 report comparing the physical custody guidelines in different counties across Ohio, finding wide discrepancies with a few counties encouraging shared parenting, with most counties favoring sole custody and while one county explicitly specified the mother as the primary custodian.

== Public education and media ==
Hubin has been interviewed and cited by a wide range of national and local media, including the Associated Press, The Lantern, the New York Times, Cincinnati Public Radio, the Ohio Media Association, WGN Radio, the Norwalk Reflector, WCBE Radio, and the Cleveland Scene.

== Selected publications ==
=== Scholarly articles and reports ===
- Hubin DC. Justice and future generations. Philosophy & Public Affairs. 1976 Oct 1:70-83.
- Hubin DC. The scope of justice. Philosophy & Public Affairs. 1979 Oct 1:3-24.
- Hubin DC, The Moral Justification of Benefit/Cost Analysis, Economics and Philosophy, 10(1994), 169–194.
- Hubin DC, Haely K, Rape and the reasonable man, Law and Philosophy, 18:113–139, 1999.
- Hubin DC, Parental Rights and Due Process, The Journal of Law and Family Studies, 1:2(1999)123-150.
- Hubin DC, What's Special About Humeanism, Noûs, 33:1(1999)30-45.
- Hubin DC, The Groundless Normativity of Instrumental Rationality, The Journal of Philosophy 98:9(2001)445-468.
- Hubin DC, Desires, Whims and Values, The Journal of Ethics, 7(2003 )315-335.
- Hubin DC, Daddy Dilemmas: Untangling the Puzzles of Paternity, The Cornell Journal of Law and Public Policy, 13(2003)29-80.
- Hubin DC, Reproductive Interests: Puzzles at the Periphery of the Property Paradigm, Social Philosophy and PolicySocial Philosophy and Policy 29(2012)106-125.
- Hubin DC, Elements of Stereotypical Fatherhood, 2013.
- Hubin DC, Glandorf F, Carpenter-Hubin JW, NPO Ohio Parenting Time Report, National Parents Organization, August 29, 2018.

=== Book chapters ===
- Hubin DC, Empty and ultimately meaningless gestures?, In Garcia RK, King NL, editors. Is goodness without God good enough?: a debate on faith, secularism, and ethics. Rowman and Littlefield, 2009.

=== Encyclopedias and handbooks ===
- Hubin DC, Fatherhood, International Encyclopedia of Ethics, Wiley-Blackwell, (2013).
- Hubin DC, Procreators' Duties: Sexual Asymmetries, Oxford Handbook of Reproductive Ethics, (2017) 301-324.

=== Popular press ===
- Don Hubin, What kind of country does the U.S. want to be?, The Chronicle of Higher Education, January 9, 2011.
- Matt Hale and Don Hubin, Kids deserve both parents, Cincinnati Enquirer, July 31, 2017.
- Donald Hubin, Marion County is cheating children, Marion Star, September 15, 2018.
- Donald Hubin, Divorce is hard enough on children -- why are our courts making it worse?, Fox News, September 16, 2018.
- Donald Hubin, Ohio family courts compound damage of divorce, Columbus Dispatch, 2018.
- Donald Hubin, Miami County is cheating children, Piqua Daily Call, September 9, 2018.
