= Ruth Lapide =

German historian and theologian (1929–2022)

- Born: Ruth Rosenblatt; 1929; Burghaslach, Bavaria, Germany
- Died: 30 August 2022 (aged 92–93); Frankfurt, Hesse, Germany
- Education: Hebrew University
- Occupations: Theologian; historian; academic teacher
- Organization: Lutheran University of Applied Sciences Nuremberg
- Spouse: Pinchas Lapide
- Awards: Order of Merit of the Federal Republic of Germany; Austrian Decoration for Science and Art

Ruth Lapide (née Rosenblatt; 1929 – 30 August 2022) was a German theologian and historian who was foremost among German language scholars to facilitate and improve understanding between Jews and Christians. After studies in Jerusalem, she returned to Germany in 1974 with her husband Pinchas Lapide, where they co-authored many books. Lapide taught at the Lutheran University of Applied Sciences Nuremberg, appeared on television, and was an advisor to the German Bishops' Conference.

== Life ==
Ruth Rosenblatt was born in Burghaslach in 1929. Her family of rabbis had lived in Germany since the 12th century. She escaped the Nazi regime to British Mandatory Palestine in 1940. She studied political science, history and Judaic studies at the Hebrew University in Jerusalem. She specialized in the evolution of Christianity as a Jewish-rooted religion and became a full professor. She returned to Germany with her Vienna-born husband, Pinchas Lapide, in 1974. Together, they helped to facilitate dialogue and reconciliation between Jews and Christians, and Germany and Israel. They also established a dialogue with Muslims. After her husband's death in 1997, she continued the work, together with their son Yuval. She wrote books and appeared on television, and in 2007 she began teaching at the Lutheran University of Applied Sciences Nuremberg. She met several popes in audiences, and was a regular advisor to the German Bishops' Conference.

From 1974, Lapide and her family lived in Frankfurt, where she died on 30 August 2022. Ina Hartwig, Frankfurt's city councillor responsible for culture and science, wrote: "Ruth Lapide was in many respects an exceptional figure. As a religious scholar, she not only possessed exceptional professional expertise, but despite detailed knowledge of the historical ramifications of Judaism and Christianity, she always maintained a perspective that emphasised what united them. With her great services to the Christian-Jewish dialogue, Ruth Lapide made a significant contribution to the development of the culture of remembrance in Germany." ("Ruth Lapide war in vielerlei Hinsicht eine Ausnahmeerscheinung. Als Religionswissenschaftlerin besaß sie nicht nur eine außergewöhnliche fachliche Expertise, sondern bewahrte sich trotz detaillierter Kenntnisse der historischen Verästelungen von Juden- und Christentum stets eine Perspektive, die das Verbindende betont. Mit ihren großen Verdiensten um den christlich-jüdischen Dialog lieferte Ruth Lapide für die Entwicklung der bundesdeutschen Erinnerungskultur einen maßgeblichen Beitrag".)

== Work ==
An important part of Lapide's work deals with biblical mistranslations and with the Jewish roots of Christianity. She worked in this endeavor with her husband, publishing more than 40 books together. She strove to support better understanding of Jews and Christians by looking at texts, instead of abstract appeals. For example she was concerned about a petition in The Lord's Prayer, "Und führe uns nicht in Versuchung" ("and lead us not into temptation"), which would more precisely be translated into "Lass uns der Versuchung nicht erliegen" (Let us not surrender to temptation), or "Führe uns in der Versuchung" (Guide us in temptation). The pope even agreed with her argument for a rewording, but the German Bishops' Conference retained the traditional wording.

Lapide is widely known from numerous television appearances. On Bayerischer Rundfunk's program Alpha-Forum, she often explained biblical topics, such as Noah, Isaac and Elijah. On Bibel TV, she had a discussion series with Henning Röhl, Die Bibel aus jüdischer Sicht (The Bible in Jewish perspective).

== Honours ==
In 2000, Lapide was awarded the Order of Merit of the Federal Republic of Germany. On 11 April 2003, she received the Hessian Order of Merit. In 2008 she received an honorary doctorate at the Protestant Augustana Divinity School in Neuendettelsau, Bavaria. She was awarded the Wolfram-von-Eschenbach-Preis of Middle Franconia in 2010, and in 2015, she was awarded the Austrian Decoration for Science and Art. The same year, she received the Ehrenplakette of Frankfurt, for her decades-long dedication to fostering understanding between Jews and Christians, to reconciliation with Israel, and to a rapprochement of the three great monotheistic religions.

== Publications ==
Most of Lapide's publications were written with her husband. Books in her name include:

- Kennen Sie Adam, den Schwächling? Kreuz Verlag, Stuttgart 2003, ISBN 3-7831-2224-4
- Kennen Sie Jakob, den Starkoch? Kreuz Verlag, Stuttgart 2003, ISBN 3-7831-2320-8
- Was glaubte Jesus? (with Henning Röhl), Kreuz Verlag, Stuttgart 2006, ISBN 978-3-7831-2589-4
