= Emma Fransson =

Swedish researcher

- Education: Karolinska Institute (Ph.D.)
- Known for: Shared parenting, Stress during pregnancy
- Scientific career
- Workplaces: Karolinska Institute, Stockholm University, Uppsala University
- Thesis: Preterm birth : parents' experiences, affect, stress and inflammatory markers (2012)

Emma Fransson is a Swedish child psychologist and epidemiologist at Stockholm University and the Karolinska Institute. Her expertise is in the health and social implication of shared parenting arrangements on children after their parents are divorced. She has also studied the effects of stress during pregnancy.

== Education ==
Fransson studied psychology at Stockholm University, Sweden, graduating in 2004. In 2012, she obtained her Ph.D. in medical sciences from the Karolinska Institute in Stockholm.

== Scientific research ==
Fransson was a co-lead investigator on the Elvis project at the Center for Health Equity Studies, jointly run by Stockholm University and the Karolinska Institute between 2011 - 2021. In this project, children were followed after their parents had divorced or separated, with various physical and mental health outcomes measured, as well as social and behavioral metrics. In this project, Fransson showed that the well-being of children is higher under shared parenting versus sole custody.

Fransson was also a co-lead investigator for the BASIC (Biology, Affect, Stress, Imaging, and Cognition) study conducted at Uppsala University between 2009 - 2018 and is currently involved with the Mom2B study, also at Uppsala University.

== Media attention ==
Her research on shared parenting has been cited by The Guardian, when she found the same level of psychological complaints in children in shared residency as in those in nuclear families, while children living with one parent had higher levels of psychological complaints. Her research has also been covered by Diritto & Diritti in Italy, ABC Nyheter in Norway, Extra Bladet in Denmark, Wiener Zeitung in Austria, Svenska Dagbladet in Sweden, and Observador in Portugal.

== Bibliography (selected) ==
- Fransson E, Örtenstrand A, Hjelmstedt A. Antenatal depressive symptoms and preterm birth: a prospective study of a Swedish national sample. Birth. 2011 38:10-16.
- Fransson E, Dubicke A, Byström B, Ekman‐Ordeberg G, Hjelmstedt A, Lekander M. Negative emotions and cytokines in maternal and cord serum at preterm birth. American Journal of Reproductive Immunology. 2012, 67:506-514.
- Bergström M, Modin B, Fransson E, Rajmil L, Berlin M, Gustafsson PA, Hjern A. Living in two homes-a Swedish national survey of wellbeing in 12 and 15 year olds with joint physical custody. BMC Public Health. 2013, 13:868.
- Bergström M, Fransson E, Modin B, Berlin M, Gustafsson PA, Hjern A. Fifty moves a year: is there an association between joint physical custody and psychosomatic problems in children? Journal of Epidemiology and Community Health. 2015.
- Fransson E, Sarkadi A, Hjern A, Bergström M. Why should they live more with one of us when they are children to us both?: Parents' motives for practicing equal joint physical custody for children aged 0–4. Children and youth services review. 2016, 66:154-160.
- Fransson E, Låftman SB, Östberg V, Hjern A, Bergström M. The living conditions of children with shared residence–the Swedish example. Child Indicators Research. 2017 Jan:1-23.
- Fransson E, Hjern A, Bergström M. What Can We Say Regarding Shared Parenting Arrangements for Swedish Children?, Journal of Divorce & Remarriage, 2018, 59,349-358.
- Fransson E, Låftman SB, Östberg V, Bergström M. Wellbeing among children with single parents in Sweden: focusing on shared residence. In R. Nieuwenhuis & L. C. Maldonado (Eds.), The triple bind of single-parent families. Resources, employment and policies to improve well-being. Great Britain: Policy Press, 2018.
- Fransson E, Sorensen F, Kunovac Kallak T, Ramklint M, Eckerdal P, Heimgartner M, Krageloh-Mann I, Skalkidou A. Maternal Perinatal Depressive Symptoms Trajectories and Impact on Toddler Behavior – The Importance of Symptom Duration and Maternal Bonding, Journal of Affective Disorders (2020), doi: https://doi.org/10.1016/j.jad.2020.04.003
