= Ian Hutchinson (scientist) =

American physicist

- Born: June 7, 1951 (age 75)
- Education: University of Cambridge (B.A. in Physics); Australian National University (Ph.D. in Engineering Physics)
- Known for: Fellow of the American Physical Society (1988); Chair of APS Division of Plasma Physics (2008)
- Notable work: Principles of Plasma Diagnostics

Ian Horner Hutchinson (7 June 1951) is a nuclear engineer and physicist who is currently Professor of Nuclear Science and Engineering at the Massachusetts Institute of Technology. He has made a number of important contributions to the fields of nuclear engineering and nuclear physics and has also written about the philosophy of science and the relationship between religion and science.

== Education and nuclear research ==
Hutchinson received his B.A. in physics from Cambridge University in 1972. He then received his Ph.D. in engineering physics from Australian National University in 1976, where he was a Commonwealth Scholar.

After receiving his Ph.D. Hutchinson performed experimental research on one of the earliest tokamaks to be operated outside of the Soviet Union. He engaged in further research at MIT during its first major tokamak research initiative, before doing research for the United Kingdom Atomic Energy Authority. He returned to MIT in 1983 as a faculty member in the Nuclear Engineering Department, and served as the head of the Department of Nuclear Physics and Engineering from 2003 to 2009.

Hutchinson has authored more than 160 journal articles on plasma phenomena and nuclear fusion. He was the 2008 chairman of the Division of Plasma Physics group of the American Physical Society, of which he had been elected a fellow in 1988. He is author of the standard monograph on measuring plasmas, Principles of Plasma Diagnostics.

== Science and religion ==
Hutchinson has authored a book on the philosophy of science, arguing against scientism. Hutchinson is a contributor to the BioLogos Foundation and has written and spoken on the relationship between science and religion, arguing that religious belief, and belief in Christianity in particular, can be perfectly reconciled with science. He has spoken at the Veritas Forum on the topic of miracles, debating atheist philosophy professor Donald Hubin. He has also argued against New Atheism.

== TtH ==
Hutchinson is the author of the computer program TtH, a TeX to HTML translator, a popular program for web-publishing of mathematics.
