= Joint custody in Spain =

In Spain, joint custody is the equal right of both parents to take legal custody of their children. It began in 2005, when a new divorce law introduced the notion of joint custody (Spanish: custodia compartida), subject to the agreement of both parents. Subsequently, some regional parliaments have passed laws that make shared parenting the preferred option.

== The joint custody law in Spain ==
The 2005 divorce law (Law 15/2005) introduced the important new possibility of joint custody, even though this is subject to the mutual agreement of both parents. Such agreement is given only in rare cases. Practically, in most divorce cases the sole custody of the child is given to the mother.

Joint custody, or co-parenting, has been defined as "the legal situation where, in case of divorce, both parents have equal rights to take legal custody of their children".

Joint custody is intended to fulfill the provisions of the Convention on the Rights of the Child. Proclaimed by the General Assembly of the United Nations on November 20, 1989 and ratified by Spain on November 30, 1990, these provisions require states to respect the child's right to maintain personal relations and direct contact with both parents on a regular basis, unless it is damaging to the interests of the child.

In Spain, the custody of children after a separation is governed by art. 92 of the Civil Code, amended by Law 15/2005, of July 8, in terms of separation and divorce. This article considers the joint custody regime, although the possibility of agreement distinguishes joint custody by agreement of the parents (Article 92.5) when requested by parents in the proposed regulatory agreement when both reach this agreement in the course of legal proceedings (Article 92.8). Exceptionally, even without such agreement, the judge, requested by either party and with a favorable report from the Public Prosecutor, may grant shared custody on the basis that this is the only way to adequately protect the interests of the minor.

In no case should a joint custody be granted if either parent is the subject of criminal proceedings initiated by endangering the life, physical integrity, freedom, moral integrity or sexual freedom or integrity of the other spouse or the children who live with both, nor proceed when the judge gives notice of the claims of the parties and the evidence presented demonstrates founded suspicion of domestic violence.

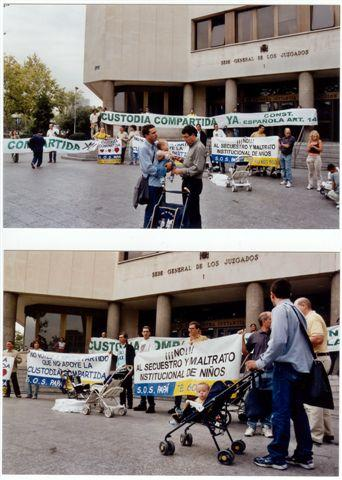

Therefore, despite the reform, unless joint custody is agreed upon by both parents, joint custody remains exceptional, which requires a favorable report of the prosecution and is based only on the protection of the interests of the child, which makes the practical application of this rule very restrictive.

However, the situation seems to be undergoing a change in many courts. A Supreme Court decision, dated July 7, 2011, recalls that the starting point when deciding on the future of the children following the breakdown of a marriage is to protect their interests: among them the previous practice of parenting in their relationship with the child, their personal abilities, and the children's wishes.

It should be understood that the wording of Article 92 "cannot conclude" that joint custody "is an exceptional measure", but "on the contrary, should be considered normal, is effective because it allows children to interact with both parents, even in crisis situations, whenever possible."

== Regional differences ==
Some autonomous communities, such as Aragon, Catalonia, Navarra and Valencia, have regional specific custody legislation. Compared to the Spanish Civil Code (The Civil Code of Spain) (Spanish: Código Civil), formally the Royal Decree of 24 July 1889 (Spanish: Real Decreto de 24 de julio de 1889) is the law that regulates the major aspects of Spanish civil law), the regional legislation promotes joint custody as a general or preferred option that does not require the agreement of both parties nor a report from the Public Prosecutor. In this way, the regional legislation circumvents two vetoes that often prevented the application of joint custody in practice.

=== Aragon ===
Child custody in Aragon is regulated by law 2/2010 on the Equality in Family Relations. In Spain, this law pioneered joint custody as the preferred option after divorce or separation, while always evaluating the specific case and seeking the best interest of the child.

=== Catalonia ===
The Catalan child custody law, which came into force on January 1, 2011, provides for the preferential treatment of joint custody, but it will not be granted by default, and if there is no agreement between the parents, the judge will decide which of the two assumes the "guardian" of the minor children. AT the time of divorce or separation, couples with children are required to file a "parenting plan" with the court, delineating a proposal from each parent regarding the custody of the children and their upbringing and education.

=== Valencian Community ===
The Valencian Parliament approved a new child custody law on March 23, 2011, and under the name 5/2011 it was supposed to go into effect on May 5, 2011. However, the Prime Minister appealed the constitutionality of the law to the Constitutional Court, which ruled that the law was unconstitutional.

== See also ==
- Best interests
- Child custody
- Divorce
- Family law
- Family court
- Legal custody
- Parens patriae
- Parenting plan
- Physical custody
- Shared parenting
- Ward of the state
