= Joint custody =

Court order whereby custody of a child is awarded to both parties

Joint custody is a form of child custody pursuant to which custody rights are awarded to both parents. Joint custody may refer to joint physical custody, joint legal custody, or both combined.

In joint legal custody, both parents of a child share major decision making regarding for example education, medical care and religious upbringing. In joint physical custody, also called shared parenting or shared residency, the child spends equal or close to equal amount of time with both parents.

After a divorce or separation, parents may have joint physical custody as well as joint legal custody of their children, or commonly, they may have joint legal custody while one parent has sole physical custody, or rarely, they may have joint physical custody while one parent have sole legal custody.

The opposite of joint physical custody is sole custody, where one parent has full parental control and decision-making authority, while the other parent may have visitation rights to regularly see their child. Joint physical custody is different from split custody, where some siblings live with one parent while other siblings live with the other parent.

== History ==
The concept of a child did not exist until Jean-Jacques Rousseau proposed the concept of a child. Children were considered small adults and were treated like adults around the age of 7. Also, in ancient times, it was customary for the mother to have custody of a young child until the child reached the age of 7. In the 19th century, parental authority was generally given to the mother, unless the court found the mother to be an ineligible parent.

== Definitions ==
While terminology used may vary, joint custody breaks down into two broad categories. Joint physical custody involves a parenting arrangement in which a child spends substantial time residing with each parent, though time need not be equal. Joint legal custody involves shared authority for important decisions pertaining to a child, such as education, medical care, and religious upbringing..

=== Joint legal custody ===
In joint legal custody, both parents share decision-making rights with regard to matters that may have a significant impact on their children's lives, such as where a child should attend school, the choice of a primary care physician or therapist for the child, and medical treatments. Both parents also have the ability right access to their children's records, such as educational records, health records, and other records. Under sole physical custody arrangements, joint legal custody has been found to have beneficial effects on children compared to sole legal custody.

=== Joint physical custody ===
In joint physical custody, the child lives an equal amount of time with both parents or for considerable amount of time with each parent. Typically, the family court issues a parenting schedule that defines the time that the child will spend with each parent.

The percentage of joint physical versus sole physical custody varies between countries. In a comparative survey from 2005/06, covering children ages 11 to 15, it was highest in Sweden with 17% and lowest in Turkey and Ukraine with only 1%.

Studies suggest that joint custody may significantly contribute to a child's wellbeing, with lower rates of mental health issues and substance abuse, better school performance, better physical health and better family relationships as compared to children in households where one parent has sole physical custody. On the whole, studies show that children experience better outcomes in joint custody arrangements and where they have good access to both parents. While not all studies of joint custody have resulted in similar findings, none have found that harm results from joint custody.

== Worldwide ==
=== Japan ===
Joint custody was not legally recognized in Japan until 2024, when a new law was passed introducing that concept, to be applied from 2026. Japanese courts favor granting custody to a primary caregiver, and nearly always award custody to the parent who is in possession of the children, even in the aftermath of parental kidnapping. It is estimated that one in three children in Japan, after divorce, lose contact with the non-custodial parent, a much higher proportion than in most other countries. The law traditionally favored men, although in recent decades in practice it ended up favoring women.

Many Japanese parents believe that recognition of joint custody rights will reduce the problem of parental kidnapping and improve parent-child relationships following a custody case; however others have been concerned that the law will allow abusive parents to remain in contact with their former spouse and the child, and the reform has also been controversial. According to the new law, if one parent refuses the joint custody that the other is asking for, the court will decide the outcome.

=== Spain ===
In a 2005/06 survey, about 6 percent of Spanish children ages 11 to 15 lived in a joint physical custody arrangement versus sole physical custody.

Joint physical custody was introduced into Spanish law in 2005, subject to agreement by both parents. Some regions, such as Aragon and Catalonia, have subsequently passed laws that makes it the preferred option.

=== United Kingdom ===
In the United Kingdom in 2005/06, about 7 percent of 11-15 year old children lived in a joint physical versus sole physical custody arrangement.

=== United States ===
In the United States, both joint physical and joint legal custody are common. Between 1985 and 2014, custody arrangements involving joint physical custody grew from approximately 13% to 34%, and has since become commonplace. As of 2017, approximately 30.6 percent of noncustodial parents had some type of joint-custody arrangement.

== See also ==
- Best interests
- Child custody
- Coparenting
- Divorce
- Family law
- Family court
- Joint custody (Spain)
- Joint custody (United States)
- Legal custody
- Parens patriae
- Parenting plan
- Shared residency in England
- Shared parenting
- Ward of the state
