= Coparenting =

Relationship focused on raising children

Co-parenting involves parents who together take on the socialization, care, and upbringing of children for whom they share equal responsibility. The co-parent relationship differs from an intimate relationship between adults in that it focuses solely on the child. The equivalent term in evolutionary biology is bi-parental care, where parental investment is provided by both the mother and father.

The original meaning of co-parenting was mostly related to post-divorce parenting arrangements. Only later did the term become extended to shared parenting before divorce, i.e. in intact nuclear families. Since the United Nations Convention on the Rights of the Child, 20 November 1989, the principle that a child has to continue to maintain a strong relationship with both parents, even if separated, has become a more recognized right. The concept of co-parenting was continued to be broadened to all adults serving as parental figures or caretakers for a child--including grandparents or other family members, romantic partners, and close friends whether co-residing or not.

== Married and cohabitation parents ==
Children benefit from more co-parenting, but the amount of co-parenting varies between couples. Bryndl Hohmann-Marriott has found that the level of collaborative co-parenting was higher among unmarried cohabitation parents and among those who married in response to pregnancy, compared to married couples that became pregnant during a marriage.

In a shared earning/shared parenting marriage, child care is divided equally or approximately equally between the two parents. In a parenting marriage, the parents live and raise their children together in a purpose-based marriage without physical intimacy or expectation to share mutual romantic love.

== Separated parents ==
Post-separation co-parenting describes a situation where two parents work together to raise a child after they are divorced, separated, or never having lived together. Advocates for co-parenting oppose the habit to grant custody of a child exclusively to a single parent and promote shared parenting as a protection of the right of children to continue to receive care and love from all parents. Epidemiological studies have shown that joint custody and other arrangements where children have greater access to both parents lead to better physical, mental and health outcomes for children.

== Elective co-parenting ==
Elective co-parenting, also referred to as parenting partnerships or partnered parenting, may be used as a choice by individuals seeking to have children but who do not wish to enter into a conventional relationship. This phenomenon has been a common practice for gay men and lesbian women in the past, but has become recently more common among heterosexual men and women.

== Co-parenting by more than two adults ==
Subject to the laws of their nation of residence, more than two adults may enter into a formal agreement to care for a child together even though only two of them may be granted official legal custody in most countries. The Netherlands is considering a new law making it legal for up to four co-parents to be granted official custody. In one case, a family of four parents consisting of a gay and a lesbian couple care for their child based on a formal agreement.

== Co-parenting in global perspective ==
This principle of co-parenting was established in Italy at the beginning of the 21st century by the Associations of Separated Parents that for years has been fighting against a culture, a social mindset, and a legislative and legal system that is discriminating among genders in the conflicts between former partners, especially when children are involved. Such associations are in fact also committed to solving several problems related to separations and divorces, such as international child abductions, parental alienation syndrome, and equal rights between genders in judicial separations and divorces.

The principle of co-parenting (Italian: Principio di bigenitorialità) states that a child has always and in any case the right to maintain a stable relationship with both parents, even if they are separated or divorced, unless there is a recognized need to separate them from one or both parents.

Such a right is based on the concept that to be a parent is a commitment that an adult takes with respect to their children, not to the other parent so that it can not and must not be influenced by any kind of separation among parents.

According to article 30 of the Italian Constitution, to be a parent is both a right and a duty. As a right, it cannot be constrained by an action of a third party, even if it would be the other parent; as a duty, it is not possible to abdicate it as well as it is not possible to abdicate any decreed right.

There are some very specific issues in this type of co-parenting that make being a parent or a child difficult. Organizing the child's life and activities, making sure that children receive consistent types and styles of discipline, and making sure that both parents are made aware of the issues in a child's life. Most of the time if a child is in trouble in one parent's house for serious wrongdoing at either home or school, their ensuing punishment could potentially follow them to the other parent's house.

== See also ==
- Allomothering in humans
- Family
- Fosterage
- Joint custody
- Shared earning/shared parenting marriage
- Shared parenting
- Cohabitation
