= Linda Nielsen =

Professor of adolescent and educational psychology

- Education: EdD
- Alma mater: University of Tennessee
- Known for: Shared parenting, Father-daughter relationships
- Scientific career
- Institutions: Wake Forest University
- Thesis: (1976)

Linda Nielsen is a professor of adolescent and educational psychology in the Department of Education at Wake Forest University. She has conducted research on the effects of shared parenting and on father–daughter relationships.

== Early life and education ==
Nielsen obtained her bachelor's degree from the University of Tennessee in 1969. After that she taught high school in Knoxville for four years. Subsequently, she returned to the University of Tennessee to study education, obtaining a master's degree in 1973 followed by a doctoral degree in 1976.

== Scientific work ==
In her research, Nielsen has shown that shared parenting, where a child of divorced parents spends approximately equal time with the father and the mother, generates better health, mental and social outcomes; and that a daughters’ academic and career achievements are closely related to the quality of her childhood relationships with her father.

=== Shared parenting ===
Reviewing 60 comparative research studies on shared parenting, Nielsen found that in 34 of the studies, the children with a shared parenting arrangement had better outcomes on all of the measured variables for well-being, compared with children living in a sole custody arrangement. In 14 of the studies, shared parenting children had either better or equal outcomes on all measures; in six of the studies, all very small, they had equal outcomes on all measures; and in another six studies, they had worse outcomes on one measure and equal or better outcomes on the remaining measures. The results were similar for the subset of studies that adjusted for socio-economic variables and the level of conflict between parents. The variables for which shared parenting provided the biggest advantage were family relationships, physical health, adolescent behavior and mental health, in that order. The variable with the smallest difference was academic achievement, for which only 3 out 10 studies showed an advantage for shared parenting.

Based on her own research and the research of others, Nielsen has concluded that absent situations in which children needed protection from an abusive or negligent parent even before their parents separated - children in shared-parenting families had better outcomes than children in sole physical custody families and that maintaining strong relationships with both parents by living in shared parenting families appears to offset the damage of high parental conflict and poor co-parenting.

=== Father–daughter relationships ===
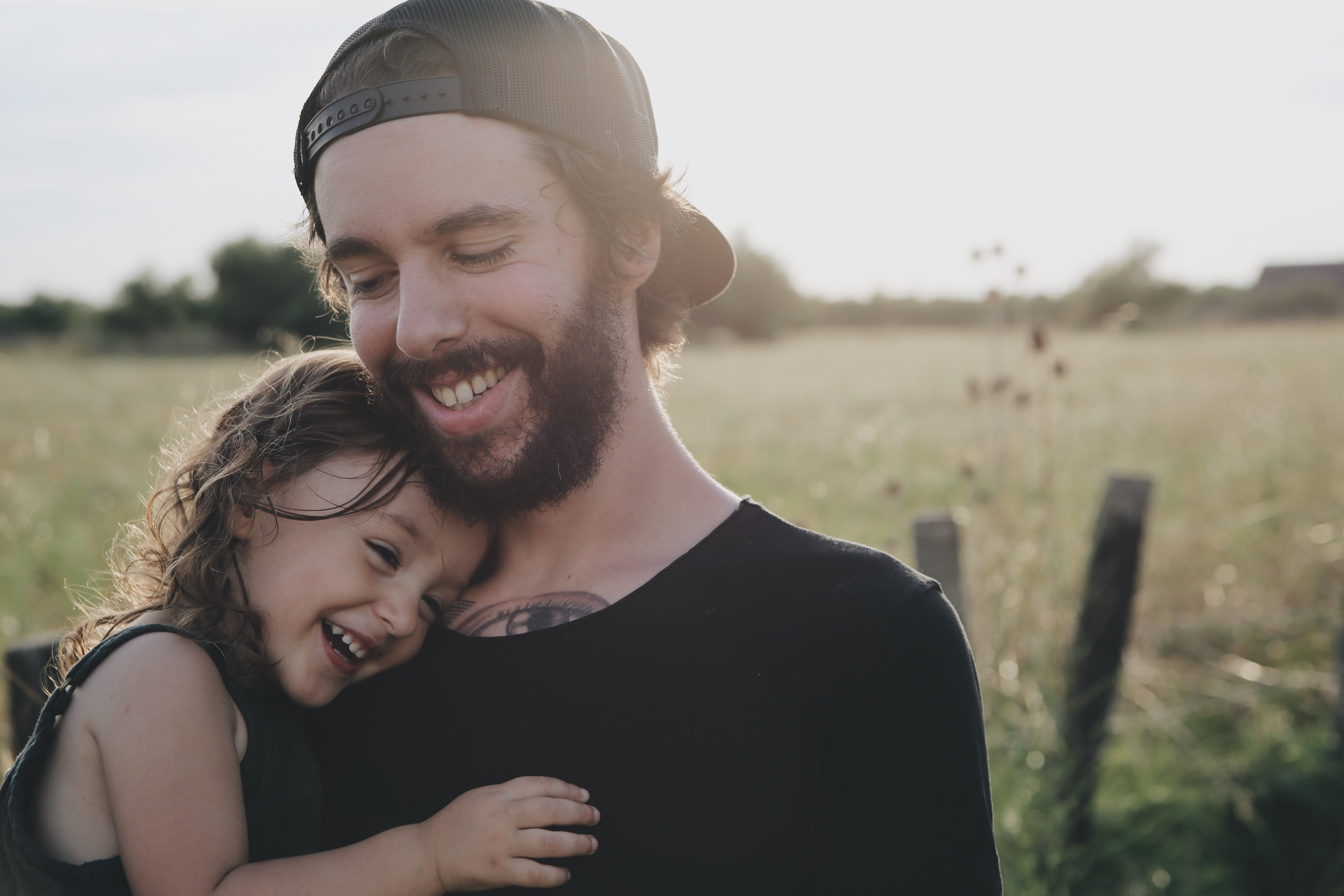
Daughter with her father

Nielsen has conducted extensive research on the importance of father–daughter relationships both during childhood on subsequent adult life, with a special emphasis on the relationship between daughters and divorced fathers.

== Selected publications ==
=== Books ===
- Linda Nielsen, How to Motivate Adolescents: A Guide for Parents, Counselors and Teachers, Prentice Hall, 1983.
- Linda Nielsen, Adolescence: A Contemporary View, Harcourt Brace, 1987.
- Linda Nielsen, Embracing Your Father: Building the Relationship You Always Wanted with Your Dad. McGraw Hill, 2004.
- Linda Nielsen, Between Fathers and Daughters: Enriching and Rebuilding Your Adult Relationship, Cumberland House Publishing, 2008.
- Linda Nielsen, Father-Daughter Relationships: Contemporary Research and Issues, Routledge, 2019, second edition.

=== Scientific articles ===
- Nielsen L, Disenfranchising, demeaning, and demoralizing divorced dads: A review of the literature, Journal of Divorce and Remarriage, 1999, 31:139–177.
- Nielsen L. Stepmothers: Why so much stress? A review of the research. Journal of Divorce and Remarriage. 1999, 30:115–48.
- Nielsen L. College daughters' relationships with their fathers: A 15-year study. College Student Journal. 2007,41:112–22.
- Nielsen L. Shared parenting after divorce: A review of shared residential parenting research. Journal of Divorce and Remarriage. 2011,52:586–609.
- Nielsen L. Divorced fathers and their daughters: A review of recent research. Journal of Divorce and Remarriage. 2011,52:77–93.
- Nielsen L, Woozles: Their role in custody law reform, parenting plans, and family court. Psychology, Public Policy, and Law, 2014, 20:164–180.
- Nielsen L. Re-examining the research on parental conflict, coparenting, and custody arrangements. Psychology, Public Policy, and Law. 2017,23:211.
- Nielsen L. Joint Versus Sole Physical Custody: Children's Outcomes Independent of Parent–Child Relationships, Income, and Conflict in 60 Studies. Journal of Divorce & Remarriage. 2018,59:247–281.

=== Popular press ===
- Linda Nielsen, Strengthening Father-Daughter Relationships: The School's Role, PTA National Magazine, 2005.
- Linda Nielsen, How Dads Affect Their Daughters into Adulthood, Institute for Family Studies, June 3, 2014.
- Linda Nielsen, How “Woozling” Deprives Babies of Fathering Time, Institute for Family Studies, June 23, 2014.
- Linda Nielsen, 10 Surprising Findings on Shared Parenting After Divorce or Separation, Institute for Family Studies, June 20, 2017.
- Linda Nielsen, How daughters can repair a damaged relationship with their divorced dad, The Conversation, July 10, 2017.
- Linda Nielsen, Fatherhood Through the Lens of Steve Jobs:What research tells us about father-daughter relationships, New York Times, August 28, 2018.
