= International Council on Shared Parenting =

- Abbreviation: ICSP
- Founded: 2013
- Type: Scientific organization
- Headquarters: Bonn, Germany
- Key people: Edward Kruk, president
- Website: TwoHomes.org
- Formerly called: International Platform on Shared Parenting

The International Council on Shared Parenting (ICSP) is an international non-profit organization that promotes and disseminates scientific research and makes recommendations on the needs and rights of children whose parents do not live together. It organizes the International Conference on Shared Parenting.

== History and organization ==
In 2013 the organization started its work informally under the name International Platform on Shared Parenting. In 2014, it was legally incorporated in Germany under the current name. The organization has a board of 13 directors, which includes the secretary general, and four members from academia, four from family professions and four from civil society. All current board members are from Europe or North America.

== International conferences ==
Since 2014, the International Council on Shared Parenting has organized the International Conference on Shared Parenting, with scientific presentations by the leading international scientists in the field of optimal post-divorce parenting arrangements. The year, venue and themes of the conferences have been:

- 2014, Bonn, Bridging the Gap between Empirical Evidence and Socio-Legal Practice
- 2015, Bonn, Best Practices for Legislative and Psycho-Social Implementation
- 2017, Boston, Shared Parenting Research: A Watershed in Understanding Children’s Best Interest?
- 2018, Strasbourg, Shared Parenting, Social Justice and Children´s Rights
- 2019, Málaga, Best Interest of the Child and Shared Parenting: an Interdisciplinary Study of the Effects of its Progressive Implementation
- 2020, Vancouver, live-stream online conference, The intersection of shared parenting and family violence

The conferences brings together scholars, legal and psychological practitioner and members of advocacy organizations. Prominent scientist that have presented at the conference include Drs. Kari Adamsons, Malin Bergström, William Fabricius, Edward Kruk, Michael Lamb, Gérard Neyrand, Linda Nielsen, Patrick Parkinson, Irwin Sandler, Hildegund Sünderhauf and Richard Warshak. As one example from the 2017 conference, Malin Bergström from Sweden presented a longitudinal study of children with separated parents, with the finding that children growing up with a shared parenting plan had only half the physical and mental health problems compared to children with a primary custody arrangement.

== See also ==
- Shared parenting
