= Denise Hines =

American psychologist

- Education: College of the Holy Cross (BA); Boston University (MA, PhD)
- Scientific career
- Fields: Psychology
- Workplaces: Clark University; George Mason University
- Thesis: A Behavioral Genetic Analysis of Intimate Partner Violence (2004)
- Doctoral advisors: Kimberly Saudino

Denise A. Hines is an American psychologist researching domestic violence and sexual abuse with focuses on prevention, intervention, and public policy. She is the Elisabeth Shirley Enochs Professor of Social Work at George Mason University.

== Education and scientific career ==
Hines graduated from the College of the Holy Cross in Worcester, Massachusetts, with a Bachelor of Arts, cum laude, in psychology and German in 1995. She then earned her M.A. in psychology in 1999 and her Ph.D. in psychology from Boston University in 2003. Her doctoral dissertation was titled, "A Behavioral Genetic Analysis of Intimate Partner Violence".

After receiving her doctorate, she became a postdoctoral researcher at the Family Research Laboratory and Crimes Against Children Research Center at the University of New Hampshire, where she worked with Murray A. Straus and David Finkelhor. In 2007, she joined the faculty in the Department of Psychology at Clark University, where she co-directed the Clark Anti-Violence Education Program. She was also the director of the Family Impact Seminars, for state politicians and policymakers.

== Scientific research ==
Hines studies the effectiveness of college prevention and intervention services for sexual assault, dating violence and stalking. She does this at her own university, by designing and evaluating the effectiveness of various interventions at the Clark Anti-Violence Education (CAVE) program.

In a series of projects, Hines has studied the physical and mental health of male victims of domestic violence from their female partners, as well as the mental and physical health of children that have witnessed domestic violence in their homes.

== Media ==
On the topic of domestic violence, Hines' has been interviewed or her research has been quoted by different media outlets, such as the Worcester Magazine the Colorado State University College News, Fox News, the Dallas Morning News, Finding Dulcinea, EmaxHealth, the Vancouver Sun in Canada, and Le Point in France.

== Selected publications ==
=== Books ===
- Malley-Morrison K, Hines D. Family violence in a cultural perspective: Defining, understanding, and combating abuse. Sage; 2004.
- Hines DA, Malley-Morrison K, Dutton LB. Family violence in the United States: Defining, understanding, and combating abuse. Sage Publications; 2012 Dec 4.

=== Scientific articles ===
- Hines DA, Malley-Morrison K. Psychological effects of partner abuse against men: A neglected research area. Psychology of Men & Masculinity. 2001 Jul;2(2):75.
- Hines DA, Saudino KJ. Intergenerational transmission of intimate partner violence: A behavioral genetic perspective. Trauma, Violence, & Abuse. 2002 Jul;3(3):210-25.
- Hines DA, Saudino KJ. Gender differences in psychological, physical, and sexual aggression among college students using the Revised Conflict Tactics Scales. Violence and victims. 2003 Apr 1;18(2):197-217.
- Hines DA, Brown J, Dunning E. Characteristics of callers to the domestic abuse helpline for men. Journal of Family Violence. 2007 Feb 1;22(2):63-72.
- Hines DA. Predictors of sexual coercion against women and men: A multilevel, multinational study of university students. Archives of sexual behavior. 2007 Jun 1;36(3):403-22.
- Hines DA, [ |Douglas EM . Women's use of intimate partner violence against men: Prevalence, implications, and consequences. Journal of Aggression, Maltreatment & Trauma. 2009 Aug 19;18(6):572-86.
- Hines DA, Douglas EM. A closer look at men who sustain intimate terrorism by women. Partner Abuse. 2010 Jan 1;1(3):286.
- Hines D, Douglas E. Intimate terrorism by women towards men: does it exist?. Journal of aggression, conflict and peace research. 2010 Jul 6;2(3):36-56.
- Douglas EM, Hines DA. The helpseeking experiences of men who sustain intimate partner violence: An overlooked population and implications for practice. Journal of family violence. 2011 Aug 1;26(6):473-85.
- Hines DA, Palm Reed KM. Predicting improvement after a bystander program for the prevention of sexual and dating violence. Health promotion practice. 2015 Jul;16(4):550-9.
- Hines DA, Douglas EM. Sexual aggression experiences among male victims of physical partner violence: Prevalence, severity, and health correlates for male victims and their children. Archives of sexual behavior. 2016 Jul 1;45(5):1133-51.
- Hines DA, Douglas EM. Influence of intimate terrorism, situational couple violence, and mutual violent control on male victims. Psychology of men & masculinity. 2018 Oct;19(4):612.
- Harman JJ, Kruk E, Hines DA. Parental alienating behaviors: An unacknowledged form of family violence. Psychological bulletin. 2018 Dec;144(12):1275.

=== External links ===
- Clark University, Denise Hines
- Google Scholar, Denise Hines
