= Single parents in UK Parliaments =

435 Members of Parliament (67%) have children as of March 2024, and politicians have been single parents across the history of UK governance. However, research has shown that 'women in politics are less likely to be mothers than men in politics are to be fathers', and that women in the House of Commons are generally more likely to be unmarried, childless or have fewer children than men in parliament. New parents who are politicians in the House of Commons do not have access to a formal system of maternity or paternity leave. When they are permitted to be at home, their constituencies are effectively unrepresented. Before 2020, Members of Parliament were expected to return to the chamber in-person to vote when their babies are only a few days old. Proxy voting was formally introduced in 2020 for MPs who had a baby or adopted a child.

- Constance Markievicz (1868–1927) was the first woman elected to the UK House of Commons, in December 1918. She was imprisoned in Holloway Prison on her election and did not take her seat. She gave birth to her daughter, Maeve Markievicz in 1901 (d. 1962). Her father, and Constance's husband, Casimir Markievicz moved back to Poland in 1913 and never returned to Ireland.
- Rosie Duffield (born 1971) is a Labour Party politician and MP for Canterbury since 2017. She is a victim and survivor of domestic abuse, and is a single parent to two children.
- Mims Davies (1975) is a Conservative Party politician serving as the MP for Mid Sussex since 2019. She is Parliamentary Under Secretary of State at the Department for Work and Pensions (appointed 2022). She is a single parent to two children.
- Michelle O'Neill (born 1977) is an Irish politician and First Minister of Northern Ireland (appointed February 2024). She was Vice President of Sinn Féin since 2018, and she has been the MLA for Mid Ulster in the Northern Ireland Assembly since 2007. O'Neill was a single parent from the age of 16 when she gave birth to her first child.

== See also ==
- Parliament of the United Kingdom
