= Lutheran University of Applied Sciences Nuremberg =

School

Coordinates: 49.4508°N 11.0603°E

- Evangelische Hochschule Nürnberg
- Former names: Evangelische Stiftungsfachhochschule Nürnberg; Evangelische Fachhochschule Nürnberg
- Established: 1995
- Affiliations: Evangelical Lutheran Church in Bavaria
- President: Barbara Städtler-Mach
- Academic staff: 29
- Administrative staff: 38
- Students: 806
- Location: Nuremberg, Middle Franconia, Bavaria, Germany
- Campus: Urban
- Website: evhn.de

The Lutheran University of Applied Sciences Nuremberg, (in German: Evangelische Hochschule Nürnberg (EVHN)) was founded in 1995 and is one of the smallest University of Applied Sciences in Bavaria with about 850 students and is under the auspices of the Evangelical Lutheran Church in Bavaria. Thus it is a private university, however with the full academic acknowledgement and accreditation by the Bavarian Ministry of Sciences, Research and the Arts.

== Faculty ==
EvFH Nürnberg has 29 professors.

== Organisation ==
EvFH Nürnberg is organised into the following faculties:

- Faculty of Social Sciences:
  - Social work
  - Social Business Administration
  - Special needs education
- Faculty of Care Management:
  - Care Management
  - Health Education (teaching)
- Faculty of Religious Studies:
  - Adult Educationand
  - Diakonik (Christian Social Work)

== See also ==
- Education in Germany
- List of universities in Germany
