= National Parents Organization =

U.S. non-profit organization

- Abbreviation: NPO
- Formation: 1998; 28 years ago
- Founders: Ned Holstein; John Cristofano; Phil Clendenning; John Maguire
- Type: 501(c)(3) not-for-profit charitable organization
- Purpose: Shared parenting
- Headquarters: Woburn, Massachusetts, United States
- Board Chair: Donald Hubin
- Board Vice Chair: Matt Hale
- Website: sharedparenting.org

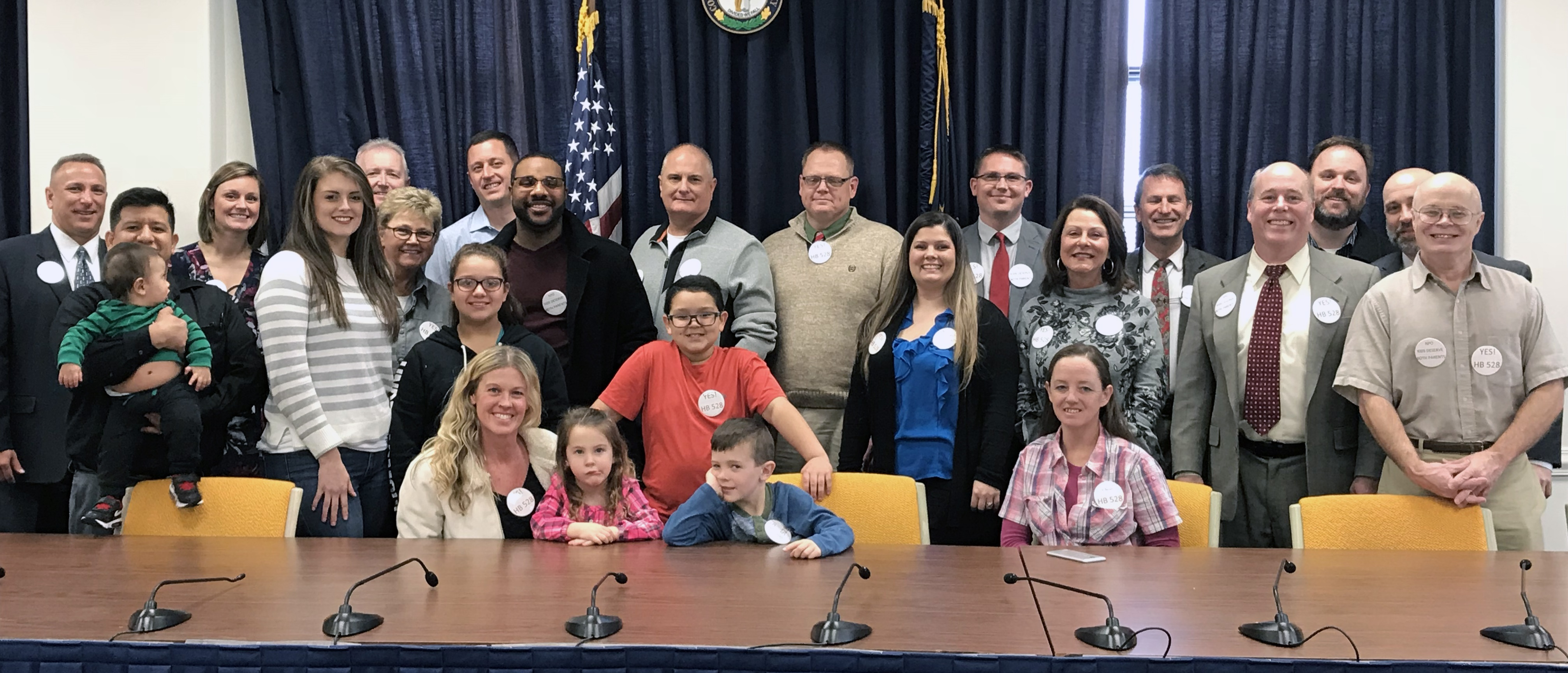
National Parents Organization's Kentucky Chapter following passage of the first in the nation shared parenting law.

The National Parents Organization (NPO) is a 501(c)(3) non-profit charitable and educational organization in the United States that promotes shared parenting. The organization focuses on family court reform, research, and public education with the goal to make shared parenting the general norm for separated parenting.

== History ==
The organization was founded in Massachusetts in 1998. The founders were Ned Holstein, John Cristofano, Phil Clendenning and John Maguire. The name was designed to reflect the organization's belief in gender-neutral shared parenting and parental equality. The stated mission of the organization is "to improve the lives of children and strengthen society by protecting every child's right to the love and care of both parents after separation or divorce."

== Family court reform ==
The National Parents Organization seeks to reform laws both at the state and the national level to encourage shared parenting. Most of the family court reform work is done by local affiliates on a state-by-state basis.

In Kentucky, the National Parents Organization, led by Matt Hale, was involved in the 2018 passage of HB528, the nation's first presumption that shared parenting is in the best interest of the child. In Virginia, the local affiliate led the campaign for House Bill 1351, requiring courts to consider shared custody arrangements.

In 2016, the NPO affiliate in Missouri helped pass a law stating that judges may not give custody preference to a parent because of gender, age, or financial status.

In Utah, the National Parents Organization was a catalyst for House Bill 35, which encourages family courts to more equally award physical custody after a divorce or separation. The bill passed in 2015.

The organization has helped pass military parent-child custody legislation in several states and has introduced legislation protecting men and children against paternity fraud. Members have served on state child support guideline revision committees.

== Research ==
The organization promotes and disseminates scientific research on how children are affected by shared parenting versus other custody arrangements.

In collaboration with the International Council on Shared Parenting, NPO organized and sponsored a conference on shared parenting that included leading researchers from around the world. Conclusions of this conference were summarized in "Shared Parenting After Parental Separation: The Views of 12 Experts," with this statement: "these 12 experts largely agreed that SP should now be a legal presumption, that a minimum of 35% of the child’s time should be allocated to each parent for the child to reap the benefits of SP, and that the existence of interparental conflict or opposition to SP by one parent should no longer be grounds to preclude or rebut SP" (p. 383).

In 2014, NPO published the 2014 NPO Shared Parenting Report Card," which graded each state on the degree to which the state's statutes promote or inhibit shared parenting after divorce or separation. The highest grade, which was just a B, was received by Alaska, Arizona, and Minnesota. The lowest grade of an F was received by New York and Rhode Island.

In 2019, NPO published another Shared Parenting Report Card. This report showed progress in enacting legislation to promote shared parenting. Two states, Arizona and Kentucky, received grades in the A range, and every legislative initiative between 2014 and 2019 was favorable to shared parenting.

In 2018 the Ohio NPO chapter evaluated and compared the court guidelines that each county uses to determine parenting time when parents cannot agree. Each county received a grade of A to F, with A given to guidelines with the most equal time. Most counties received a D, but two counties, Ashtabula and Tuscarawas, received an A, while one county, Van Wert, received an F. The media attention generated interest and discussions among judges and court officials, with some counties revising their guidelines.

The Ohio NPO chapter repeated the Ohio Parenting Time Report in the fall of 2020. It showed significant improvement in the local parenting time rules of a handful of counties. Six counties received grades in the A range and no counties received a grade of F.

== Public education ==
Through conferences and media, the National Parents Organization does public education promoting shared parenting, based on scientific research. Members also work to raise awareness of parental alienation.

Together with the International Council on Shared Parenting, the National Parents Organization sponsored the Third International Conference on Shared Parenting, held in Boston in May 2017. The theme of the conference was Shared Parenting Research: A Watershed in Understanding Children’s Best Interest? The conference had presentations by scientists in the field of optimal post-divorce parenting arrangements.

The organization engages social, local, and national media to raise awareness about the family court system, shared parenting, and parental alienation, with coverage by many both minor and major media outlets. For example, in 2018 the co-chair of the Virginia chapter wrote an Op-Ed on comparing the growing uproar to children being separated from their parents at the border with the forced child-parent separations imposed by our family courts.

== Organizational structure ==
The organization is headquartered in Newton, Massachusetts; Ned Holstein is the founder and chairman of the board emeritus. Donald Hubin, Ph.D. is the chairman of the board. Other National Parents Organization board members include Matt Hale, Cam Huffman, George Piskor, and Linda Reutzel.

There are 26 state affiliates in Alabama, Arizona, California, Colorado, Florida, Georgia, Hawaii, Idaho, Illinois, Kansas, Kentucky, Maryland, Michigan, Minnesota, Missouri, New Hampshire, New Jersey, New York, Ohio, Oregon, Pennsylvania, Rhode Island, South Carolina, Texas, Utah, Virginia, Washington, West Virginia, and Wisconsin.
