= Anna Sarkadi =

Physician and professor of public health (born 1974)

- Born: February 12, 1974; Budapest
- Education: Ph.D.
- Alma mater: Uppsala University
- Known for: Parenting, Children's health
- Spouse: Robert Kristiansson
- Children: 3
- Scientific career
- Fields: Public health, pediatrics
- Institutions: Uppsala University
- Thesis: The borderland between care and self-care (2001)
- Doctoral advisors: Urban Rosenqvist

Anna Kristiansson Sarkadi (born February 12, 1974) is a physician and professor of public health at Uppsala University in Sweden. Her expertise is in parenting and the health of children.

== Education ==
Sarkadi was born in February 1974 on the Buda side of Budapest, Hungary. She is the daughter of two physicians and professors, Zsófia Kálmán and Balázs Sarkadi, and sister of puppeteer Bence Sarkadi. She studied medicine first in Hungary and then in Sweden, where she moved in 1995. She obtained her Ph.D. in 2001 from Uppsala University, with a thesis on The borderland between care and self-care.

== Scientific research ==
Sarkadi studies the effect of different forms of parenting on children's health, and how to improve parental support from day care centers, schools and government family services. One emphasis is on the prevention of psychological and mental health problems in children. She conducts both quantitative and qualitative research studies.

=== Media ===
Sarkadi's research has been cited by the popular press in various countries, including the Irish Independent, SDP Noticias in Mexico, State of Mind in Italy, Huffington Post Deutschland in Germany, and Psychology Today in the United States.
