= Marital separation =

Cessation of spouses living together

Marital separation occurs when spouses in a marriage stop living together without getting divorced. Married couples may separate as an initial step in the divorce process or to gain perspective on the marriage and determine whether divorce is warranted. Other couples may separate as an alternative to divorce for economic or religious reasons, for tax purposes, or to ensure continuing retirement and/or health insurance benefits for both spouses. A separation can be initiated informally, or there can be a legal separation with a formal separation agreement filed with the court. As for a divorce, the latter may include provisions for alimony, whether to have sole custody or shared parenting of any children, and the amount of child support.

== Separation to enhance a marriage ==
Although the emotional impact of separation is similar to that of divorce, some argue that a temporary separation may also occur to enhance the marriage as a tool to stay together. Some experts regard a six-month separation as a good amount of time for a temporary separation, since it is long enough to set up a second household and gain perspective, but not long enough to seem permanent.

== Ground for divorce ==
A separation may be unilaterally decided by one of the spouses moving away. Many U.S. state statutes, for example Virginia's, specify that being separated for a given period of time can be grounds for divorce.
