= Shared parenting =

Child custody arrangement

Shared parenting, shared residence, joint residence, shared custody, joint physical custody, equal parenting time (EPT) is a child custody arrangement after divorce or separation, in which both parents share the responsibility of raising their child(ren), with equal or close to equal parenting time. A regime of shared parenting is based on the idea that children have the right to and benefit from a close relationship with both their parents, and that no child should be separated from a parent.

The term Shared Parenting is applied in cases of divorce, separation or when parents do not live together; in contrast, a shared earning/shared parenting marriage is a marriage where the partners choose to share the work of child-raising, earning money, house chores and recreation time in nearly equal fashion across all four domains. Shared parenting is different from split custody, where some children live primarily with their mother while one or more of their siblings live primarily with their father.

Bird's nest custody is an unusual but increasingly common form of shared parenting where the child always lives in the same home, while the two parents take turns living with the child in that home. Its long term use can be expensive as it requires three residences, and it is most commonly used as a temporary shared parenting arrangement until one parent has found a suitable home elsewhere. With two children, it may reduce the requirements from space at two locations for 3+3 = 6 persons to space for 1+3+1 = 5 persons at three locations, for 3 children the calculus is 1+4+1 = 6 spaces instead of 4+4 = 8 spaces. The availability of second accommodations for each of the parents, e.g. at their parents or new partners, or at more distant workplaces that allow only weekend commuting, affect the feasibility.

== Frequency ==
The popularity of shared parenting, or equal parenting time (EPT), has increased greatly in the past ten years. In Spain in 2022, for instance, 'Due to legal reforms, equal parenting time (EPT) laws in Spain now apply to approximately 40% of all divorces.' The frequency of shared parenting versus sole custody varies across countries, being most common in Scandinavia.

In a comparative survey of 34 western countries conducted from 2005 to 2006, the proportion of children aged 11 to 15 living in a shared parenting arrangement versus sole custody was highest in Sweden (17%), followed by Iceland (11%), Belgium (11%), Denmark (10%), Italy (9%) and Norway (9%). Ukraine, Poland, Croatia, Turkey, the Netherlands and Romania all had 2% or less. Among the English speaking countries, Canada and the United Kingdom had 7% while the United States and Ireland had 5%.

Shared parenting is increasing in popularity and it is particularly common in Scandinavia. Circa 2016–2017, the percentage in Sweden had increased to 28%; with 26% for children age 0–5 years, 34% among the 6-12 year old age group, and 23% among the oldest children ages 13–18.

== Scientific research ==
Epidemiological studies on the effect of shared parenting on children has been conducted using both cross-sectional and longitudinal study designs. Their conclusions are that children with a shared parenting arrangement have better physical, mental, social and academic outcomes compared to children in a primary parenting arrangement. These finding holds for all age groups, whether the parents have an amicable or high-conflict relationship, and after adjusting for socio-economic variables.

With its early adoption of shared parenting and excellent health data, the largest studies on shared parenting have been conducted in Sweden. In a large cross-sectional study comparing over 50,000 children, ages 12 and 15, living in either a shared or sole custody arrangement, Dr. Malin Bergström found that children with shared parenting had better outcomes for physical health, psychological well-being, moods and emotions, self-perception, autonomy, parental relations, material outcomes, peer relations, school satisfaction and social acceptance. Using data from the same cross-sectional survey, Bergström did a follow-up study focusing on psychosomatic problems of concentration, sleeping, headaches, stomach aches, tenseness, lack of appetite, sadness and dizziness. They found that both boys and girls did better living in a shared parenting versus sole custody arrangement. Both studies adjusted for selected socio-economic variables.

A review of 60 quantitative research studies found that in 34 of the studies, children in a shared parenting arrangement had better outcomes on all measured variables for well-being, most notably for their family relationships, physical health, adolescent behavior and mental health. In 14 studies, they had better or equal outcomes on all measures, in 6 studies that had equal outcomes on all measures, and in 6 studies that had worse outcomes on one measure and equal or better outcomes on the remaining measures. The results were similar for the subset of studies that adjusted for socio-economic variables and the level of conflict between parents. The variable with the smallest difference was academic achievement, for which only 3 out 10 studies showed an advantage for shared parenting. Studies indicate that children fare better in joint custody arrangements, or where they have good access to both parents, as compared to sole custody arrangements.

== Parental benefits ==
While the primary arguments for shared parenting is based on the child's best interest of having close contact with both parents in their daily life, there are also important advantages to the parents. Most parents enjoy spending time with their children, and with shared parenting, both parents have that joy in their life. Both parents also get child-free time to work or play without having to hire a baby sitter, which a sole custodial parent must do. Moreover, both parents get the same opportunity for career development and advancement. In fact, some argue that shared parenting is one critical component in the efforts to reduce the gender pay gap.

== Benefits for children ==
Not only can shared parenting benefit parents, but it can also benefit children. In a study conducted by the Hospital for Sick Children, it was found that children of parents with higher levels of shared parenting responsibilities experienced fewer emotional and conduct issues. In addition, shared parenting can help children develop better problem solving and communication skills, while also providing greater stability through consistent schedules and routines.

== Criticism ==
Early criticism of shared parenting was based upon the assumptions (i) that children need one single primary attachment figure to bond with, (ii) that child development suffer from frequent moves back and forth between two households, and (iii) that one should not disrupt the status quo. Scientific research finds support for and against these assumptions. It is important that child-specific factors like parental temperament, environmental factors, and genetic factors are considered before attempting to determine how a specific parenting style will affect a child's Attachment Theory.

A second wave of criticism argued that shared parenting increases parental conflict and that shared parenting is only suitable for parents who get along well as co-parents. Once more, research has found support for and against this criticism. The science suggests the appropriateness of any parenting style must be decided on a case-by-case basis. Parents with mental illness, personality disorder, history of abuse, or history of substance abuse may make shared parenting a poor choice. Couples at high risk for interpersonal violence also do not make good shared parenting candidates.

A third wave of criticism acknowledges that shared parenting could be an appropriate custodial arrangement but argued that there should be no presumptions in family law, with each custody decision made based upon a judge's assessment of the best interest of a child. Critics also suggest that shared parenting requires more logistical coordination.

== Legislation ==
Some legislatures have established a legal rebuttable presumption for shared parenting which favors shared parenting in most custody cases while allowing the court to order alternative arrangements based upon evidence that shared parenting would not be in the best interest of the children, such as in cases of parental child abuse or neglect. Bills promoting shared parenting have been introduced in Canada and the United States.

=== Italy ===
In 2006, Italy passed a law that made joint custody the default arrangement for separating couples. A study of the effect of the law suggested that the joint custody presumption increased the duration and complexity of custody litigation, but that it did not find evidence that parents were making concessions on the division of assets to "buy back" custody from the other parent.

=== United States ===
In 2018, Kentucky became the first jurisdiction to establish a legal presumption for shared parenting, after the house voted 81-2 and the senate voted 38–0 in favor, and after the bill was signed by governor Matt Bevin. Similar laws were passed by both chambers in Minnesota and Florida, but vetoed by the governors.

Some family lawyers and state bar associations have argued against a presumption of joint parenting. For example, concerns have been expressed that a presumption for joint custody might get in the way of negotiated custody outcomes that are better suited to the children, and joint custody might be inappropriately imposed upon couples who suffer unnecessary financial burdens or conflict as a result.

== Advocacy ==
The advocacy for shared parenting is a world-wide movement. It is unified in its belief that shared parenting is in the best interest of children, and that it is a children's right issue. The gender perspective, however, varies greatly across nations. In Scandinavian countries, such as Iceland, it is commonly viewed as a gender equity issue with strong support from women's organizations. As a contrast, in North America, several organizations see it as a father's rights issue, and some women's organizations work against shared parenting, while other women are among the strongest advocates. As yet another contrast, in countries like Turkey and Iran, it is often seen as a women's right issue, as sole custody is commonly awarded to the father.

Organizations that advocate for shared parenting as being in the best interest of children include Canadian Children's Rights Council, Children's Rights Council, Families Need Fathers, International Council on Shared Parenting, and National Parents Organization.

== See also ==
- Child custody
- Coparenting
- Parenting plan
- Parental alienation
- Parental supervision
- Shared residency in England
- Joint custody
  - Joint custody (United States)
  - Joint custody (Spain)
