= Aqumayu =

Aqumayu (Quechua for "sand river") may refer to:

== Rivers ==
- Aqumayu (Cusco), in the Cusco Region, Peru
- Aqumayu (Huánuco), in the Huánuco Region, Peru

== Places ==
- Acomayo, a location in the Acomayo Province, Cusco Region, Peru
- Acomayo District, a district in the Acomayo Province, Cusco Region, Peru
- Acomayo Province, a province in the Cusco Region, Peru
