= Paruro (disambiguation) =

Paruro may refer to:

- Paruro Province, Cusco region
- Paruro District
- Paruro
