= Echarate District =

Coordinates: 12.7676°S 72.5769°W

Echarate
- District
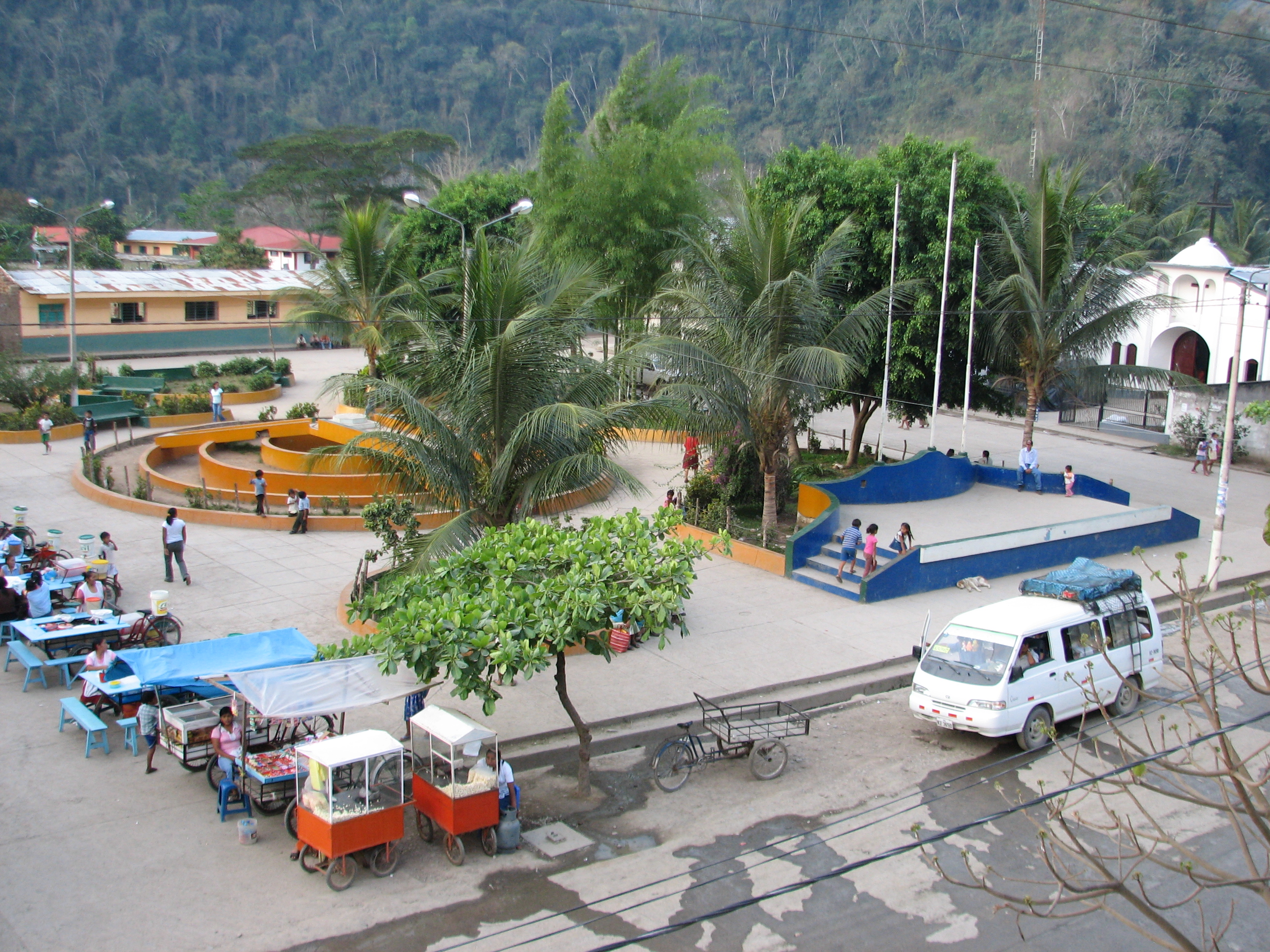
- Main Square of Kiteni
- Interactive map of Echarate
- Country: Peru
- Region: Cusco
- Province: La Convención
- Founded: January 2, 1857
- Capital: Echarate or Ercharti

Area
  - Total: 10,576 km^{2} (4,083 sq mi)
- Elevation: 1,162 m (3,812 ft)

Population (2017 census)
  - Total: 23,214
  - Density: 2.1950/km^{2} (5.6849/sq mi)
- Time zone: UTC-5 (PET)
- UBIGEO: 080902

Echarate District (or Echarati) is one of fourteen districts of the province La Convención in Peru. The town of Echarte, near the Urubamba River, is the capital of the district. In 2016, part of Echarte district was incorporated into the newly created Megantoni District.

Vilcabamba, the capital of the Neo-Inca State from 1539 to 1572, is in Echarate District. The Neo-Inca State was the last refuge of the Inca Empire until it fell to the Spaniards and their indigenous allies in 1572, signaling the end of Inca resistance to Spanish rule. Subsequently, Vilcabamba was abandoned and its location forgotten. In 1911, explorer Hiram Bingham mistakenly identified the abandoned ruin of Machu Picchu as Vilcabamba, but he also visited a ruin called Espiritu Pampa by local Peruvians. In 1964, Gene Savoy identified Espiritu Pampa as the fabled Vilcabamba, a designation widely accepted by archaeologists and historians.

== Climate ==
Climate data for Cirialo, Echarate
Month	Jan	Feb	Mar	Apr	May	Jun	Jul	Aug	Sep	Oct	Nov	Dec	Year
Mean daily maximum °C (°F)	30.6 (87.1)	30.4 (86.7)	31.2 (88.2)	31.7 (89.1)	31.4 (88.5)	31.1 (88.0)	31.1 (88.0)	31.7 (89.1)	32.2 (90.0)	32.2 (90.0)	31.9 (89.4)	31.1 (88.0)	31.4 (88.5)
Daily mean °C (°F)	25.8 (78.4)	25.6 (78.1)	26.0 (78.8)	26.1 (79.0)	25.4 (77.7)	25.4 (77.7)	24.5 (76.1)	25.0 (77.0)	25.5 (77.9)	26.1 (79.0)	26.1 (79.0)	25.6 (78.1)	25.6 (78.1)
Mean daily minimum °C (°F)	20.1 (68.2)	19.9 (67.8)	20.0 (68.0)	19.8 (67.6)	19.6 (67.3)	18.7 (65.7)	17.8 (64.0)	18.1 (64.6)	18.8 (65.8)	20.0 (68.0)	20.3 (68.5)	20.2 (68.4)	19.4 (67.0)
Average precipitation mm (inches)	273.8 (10.78)	245.3 (9.66)	168.4 (6.63)	102.6 (4.04)	37.5 (1.48)	15.4 (0.61)	16.8 (0.66)	22.9 (0.90)	49.5 (1.95)	84.9 (3.34)	115.3 (4.54)	288.0 (11.34)	1,420.4 (55.93)
Source: Plataforma del Estado Peruano

== See also ==
- Kuntur Sinqa
- Machiguenga Communal Reserve
- Megantoni National Sanctuary
- Otishi National Park
- Pongo de Mainique
- Vilcabamba, Capital of the Neo-Inca State, 1539–1572.
