= Chaparro =

Chaparro is a Spanish surname. Notable people with the surname include:

- Aldo Chaparro (born 1965), Peruvian sculptor known for his works in stainless steel
- Benigno Chaparro (born 1958), retired Paraguayan professional footballer
- Cristián Chaparro (born 1975), former Argentine footballer
- Ernesto Chaparro (1901–1957), Chilean football defender
- David Chaparro (1875–1963), Peruvian politician
- Fernando Chaparro (born 1964), Argentine sprint canoeist
- José Chaparro (1830–1906), Peruvian politician
- Janelee Chaparro (born 1991), Puerto Rican model and beauty queen
- Jonathan Chaparro (born 1999), American social justice and civil rights activist.
- Jorge Garbajosa Chaparro (born 1977), retired Spanish professional basketball player
- Leandro Chaparro (born 1991), Argentine footballer
- Mario Arturo Acosta Chaparro (1942–2012), Mexican Army general, shot dead in Mexico City
- Nahuel Tetaz Chaparro (born 1989), Argentina international rugby union player
- Omar Chaparro (born 1974), Mexican actor and media personality
- Ramón Chaparro (1862–1902), Peruvian politician
- Raúl Chaparro (born 1953), Argentine former footballer
- Rolando Chaparro (born 1965), Paraguayan musician from Asunción
- Francisco Chaparro Jara (born 1942), Spanish retired football forward and manager

== See also ==
- Chaparro prieto (Vachellia rigidula), a species of shrub or small tree in the legume family, Fabaceae
- Guayacan Chaparro (Albizia pistaciifolia), a species of legume in the family Fabaceae
- Caparo
- Chapar (disambiguation)
