= Huasquillay =

Town in the district of Omacha

- Locality
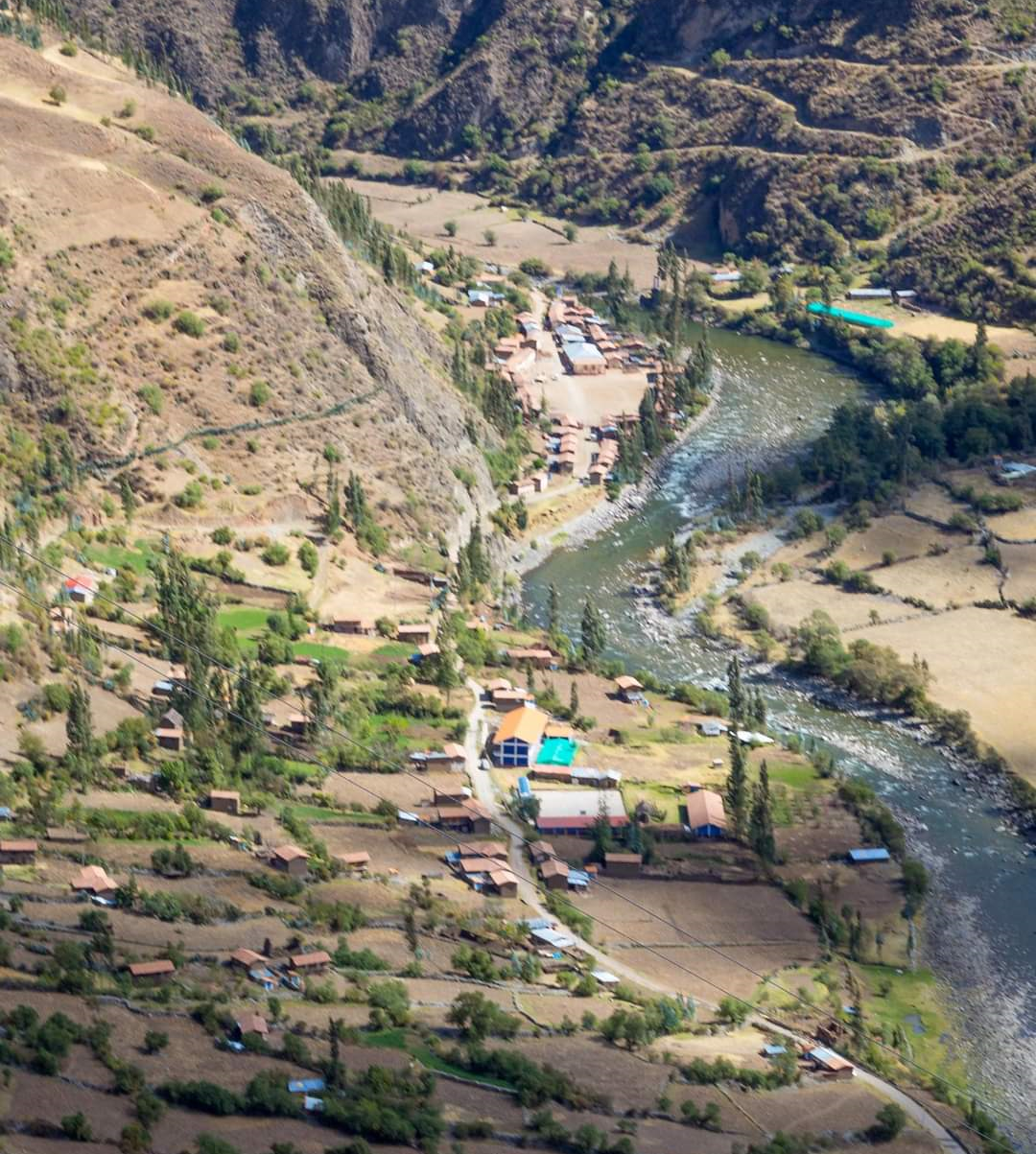
- Huasquillay in 2018
- Interactive map of Huasquillay
- Coordinates: 14.085°S 71.846667°W
- Country: Peru
- Region: Cusco
- Province: Paruro
- District: Omacha
- Founded: September 30, 1992

Government
  - Mayor: Alex Santiago Domínguez Puelles
- Elevation: 3,046 m (9,993 ft)

Population (2017 census)
  - Total: 141
- Time zone: UTC-5 (PET)
- UBIGEO: 081006

Huasquillay is a town in the district of Omacha, province of Paruro, department of Cusco in Peru. According to the 2017 National Censuses, it has a population of 141 inhabitants.

== History ==
The town of Huasquillay was created on September 30, 1992, under municipal resolution No. 013, in the government of President Alberto Fujimori.

== Geography ==
It is located on the banks of the Velille river at an altitude of 3,046 m (9,993 ft), in a temperate zone, the annual average temperature varies between 12 °C and 16 °C approximately. According to the floor altitudinal belongs to the Quechua region.

== Cultural traditions ==
Agriculture and livestock form the basis of the local economy. Agricultural products include corn, wheat, barley, potato (in various varieties), beans, peas, quinoa, squash, pumpkin and other vegetables. Fruits grown include avocado, pears, medlar, capulí, prickly pear, apple, and tumbo. Livestock raised includes Creole cattle, Brown Swiss, Holstein, sheep, horses, and pigs.

During festivities there is a fondness for cockfighting, horse racing and bullfighting.

== Authorities ==
=== Municipal ===
- 2021 - 2023
  - Mayor: Alex Santiago Domínguez Puelles.
  - Aldermen:
  1. Eufemia Mollenido Billalobos
  2. Eduardo Huillca Mayta
  3. Victor Raúl Zoluaga Huamaní
  4. Encarnación Valverde Samanes
  5. Emiliano Games Montel
