= Zoila S. Mendoza =

Peruvian anthropologist (born 1960)

- Born: 1960 (age 65–66); Piura, Department of Piura, Peru
- Occupations: Anthropologist; documentary filmmaker
- Awards: Guggenheim Fellow (2010)

Academic background
- Education: Pontifical Catholic University of Peru; University of Chicago
- Thesis: Shaping Society Through Dance: Mestizo Ritual Performance in the Southern Peruvian Highlands (1993)

Academic work
- Institutions: University of California, Davis

Zoila Silvia del Rosario Mendoza Beoutis (born 1960) is a Peruvian-born anthropologist and documentary filmmaker based in the United States. She has written books on dance and folklore in the Peruvian city of Cusco and is a professor at the University of California, Davis Department of Native American Studies.

== Biography ==
Zoila Silvia del Rosario Mendoza Beoutis was born in 1960 in the Peruvian city of Piura to Andean migrant parents. She was named after her mother and a close friend of the former, musician Yma Sumac.

Mendoza studied at the Pontifical Catholic University of Peru (PUCP), where she got her BA in 1982 and Licenciatura in 1985, and the University of Chicago, where she got her MA in 1987 and PhD in 1993; all of these degrees were both in the field of anthropology. Her PhD dissertation is titled Shaping Society Through Dance: Mestizo Ritual Performance in the Southern Peruvian Highlands. She was a 1988–1989 Fulbright Fellow.

In 1994, she joined the University of California, Davis faculty and has remained with them since. After serving some time as Lecturer, she was promoted to Assistant Professor the same year, before being moved from the Department of Music to the Department of Native American Studies in 1999. She was promoted to Associate Professor in 2001 and eventually Professor in 2008. In 2015, she became chair of the Department of Native American Studies.

As an academic, Mendoza specializes in performance art in the Andes and Peru and in the culture of the Quechua people. In the late-1980s, she started an archive of audiovisual content as part of her research, later housed at the PUCP's Instituto de Etnomusicología Andina. In 2000, she published the book Shaping Society Through Dance: Mestizo Ritual Performance in the Peruvian Andes (2000), which discusses the concept of the Department of Cuzco comparsas. She later published three books on dance and folklore in the Peruvian city of Cusco: Al Son de la Danza: Identidad y Comparsas en el Cuzco (2001); Crear y Sentir lo Nuestro: Folklore Identidad Regional y Nacional en Cuzco, Siglo XX (2006); and Creating our Own: Folklore, Performance, and Identity in Cuzco, Peru (2008). She is also fluent in the Quechua language.

In 2006, she started visiting the Pomacanchi District and participated in her first pilgrimage to the Quyllurit'i religious festival there. She later went to two more pilgrimages in 2008 and 2010. She completed her ethnographic work on the area in 2013, inspiring Qoyllur Rit’i: Crónica de una Peregrinación Cusqueña (a 2021 bilingual Spanish-Quechua book).

In 2015, she produced two documentaries: Memory Walkers, which is about the aftermath of the internal conflict in Peru; and The Pilgrimage to the Sanctuary of the Lord of Qoyllur Rit'i: The Walk Experience, inspired by her experiences with the Quyllurit'i festival.

She was appointed as a Guggenheim Fellow in 2010.

== Bibliography ==
- Shaping Society Through Dance: Mestizo Ritual Performance in the Peruvian Andes (2000)
- Al Son de la Danza: Identidad y Comparsas en el Cuzco (2001)
- Crear y Sentir lo Nuestro: Folklore Identidad Regional y Nacional en Cuzco, Siglo XX (2006)
- Creating our Own: Folklore, Performance, and Identity in Cuzco, Peru (2008)
- Qoyllur Rit’i: Crónica de una Peregrinación Cusqueña (2021)

== Filmography ==
- Memory Walkers (2015, documentary)
- The Pilgrimage to the Sanctuary of the Lord of Qoyllur Rit'i: The Walk Experience (2015, documentary)
