= Megantoni District, La Convención province =

Megantoni
- District
- Location within Peru
- Coordinates: 11.450°S 73.034°W
- Country: Peru
- Region: Cusco
- Province: La Convención
- Founded: June 6, 2016
- Capital: Comunidad Nativa de Camisea

Area
  - Total: 10,708 km^{2} (4,134 sq mi)
- Elevation: 303 m (994 ft)

Population (2017 census)
  - Total: 6,969
  - Density: 0.6508/km^{2} (1.686/sq mi)
- Time zone: UTC-5 (PET)
- UBIGEO: 080902

Megantoni District is one of fourteen districts of La Convención Province in the Cusco Region of Peru. Megantoni occupies the northernmost part of La Convención. The district was created in 2016 from land previously belonging to Echarate District. Camisea is the capital of Megantoni and has a population of about 500 people. As of 2017, the district was not connected to the rest of Peru by road. The Urubamba River bisects the district and is a major avenue of transportation.

== Protected and indigenous lands ==
Ninety-four percent of the land of Megantoni District is protected for conservation or allocated to indigenous people. The majority of this land is "almost untouched" tropical rainforest and Peruvian Yungas characteristic of the Amazon Basin and the eastern flanks of the Andes. Protected lands include the Pongo de Mainique, a scenic water gap where the Urubamba River cuts through the Vilcabamba mountain range on the southern border of Megantoni. East of the Pongo, the Megantoni National Sanctuary straddles the border with Echarate. The Kugapakari-Nahua-Nanti Indigenous Territorial Reserve covers most of the eastern one-half of the district. The Otishi National Park and the Machiguenga Communal Reserve straddle the western border of the district. Both the reserves were created to protect the lands and the "voluntary isolation" of some groups of indigenous people.

== Geography and climate ==
Most of Megantoni District consists of hills and lowland plains, but the Vilcabamba mountain range on the western border of the district rises to a maximum elevation of 3,385 metres (11,106 ft). Mountains along the southern boundary reach a maximum elevation of 1,606 metres (5,269 ft). Elevations from 1,000 to 3,500 metres (3,300 to 11,500 ft) are part of the ecoregion of "high jungle" or Peruvian Yungas. Below elevations of 1,000 metres (3,300 ft) the vegetation is typical of the Southwest Amazon moist forests ecoregion. The Pongo de Mainique on the southern border of Megantoni is a global biodiversity hotspot. According to the Wildlife Conservation Society, "the lowland rainforests and mid-montane cloud forests within a radius of five miles (8.0 km) of the Pongo possibly comprise the single most biologically-diverse site on the face of the Earth."

Camisea, the capital of Megantoni, has an Am (tropical monsoon) climate according to the Köppen climate classification system. Although there is little temperature variation among months, the austral summer receives much more precipitation than the austral winter. Under the Trewartha climate classification system, the climate is Araa: tropical rain forest with high temperatures year around.

Climate data for Camisea, Megantoni, Peru. Elevation: 303 metres (994 ft).
Month	Jan	Feb	Mar	Apr	May	Jun	Jul	Aug	Sep	Oct	Nov	Dec	Year
Mean daily maximum °C (°F)	31.3 (88.3)	30.9 (87.6)	31.2 (88.2)	32.4 (90.3)	31.9 (89.4)	31.5 (88.7)	31.3 (88.3)	32.8 (91.0)	31.9 (89.4)	32.7 (90.9)	32.0 (89.6)	31.0 (87.8)	31.7 (89.1)
Daily mean °C (°F)	26.1 (79.0)	25.9 (78.6)	25.8 (78.4)	26.4 (79.5)	25.5 (77.9)	24.8 (76.6)	24.6 (76.3)	25.9 (78.6)	25.6 (78.1)	26.6 (79.9)	26.3 (79.3)	25.6 (78.1)	25.8 (78.4)
Mean daily minimum °C (°F)	20.9 (69.6)	20.9 (69.6)	20.5 (68.9)	20.4 (68.7)	19.2 (66.6)	18.2 (64.8)	18.0 (64.4)	19.1 (66.4)	19.3 (66.7)	20.6 (69.1)	20.7 (69.3)	20.3 (68.5)	19.8 (67.7)
Average precipitation mm (inches)	233 (9.2)	221 (8.7)	208 (8.2)	154 (6.1)	71 (2.8)	55 (2.2)	59 (2.3)	71 (2.8)	113 (4.4)	165 (6.5)	207 (8.1)	213 (8.4)	1,770 (69.7)

== Camisea Gas Field ==
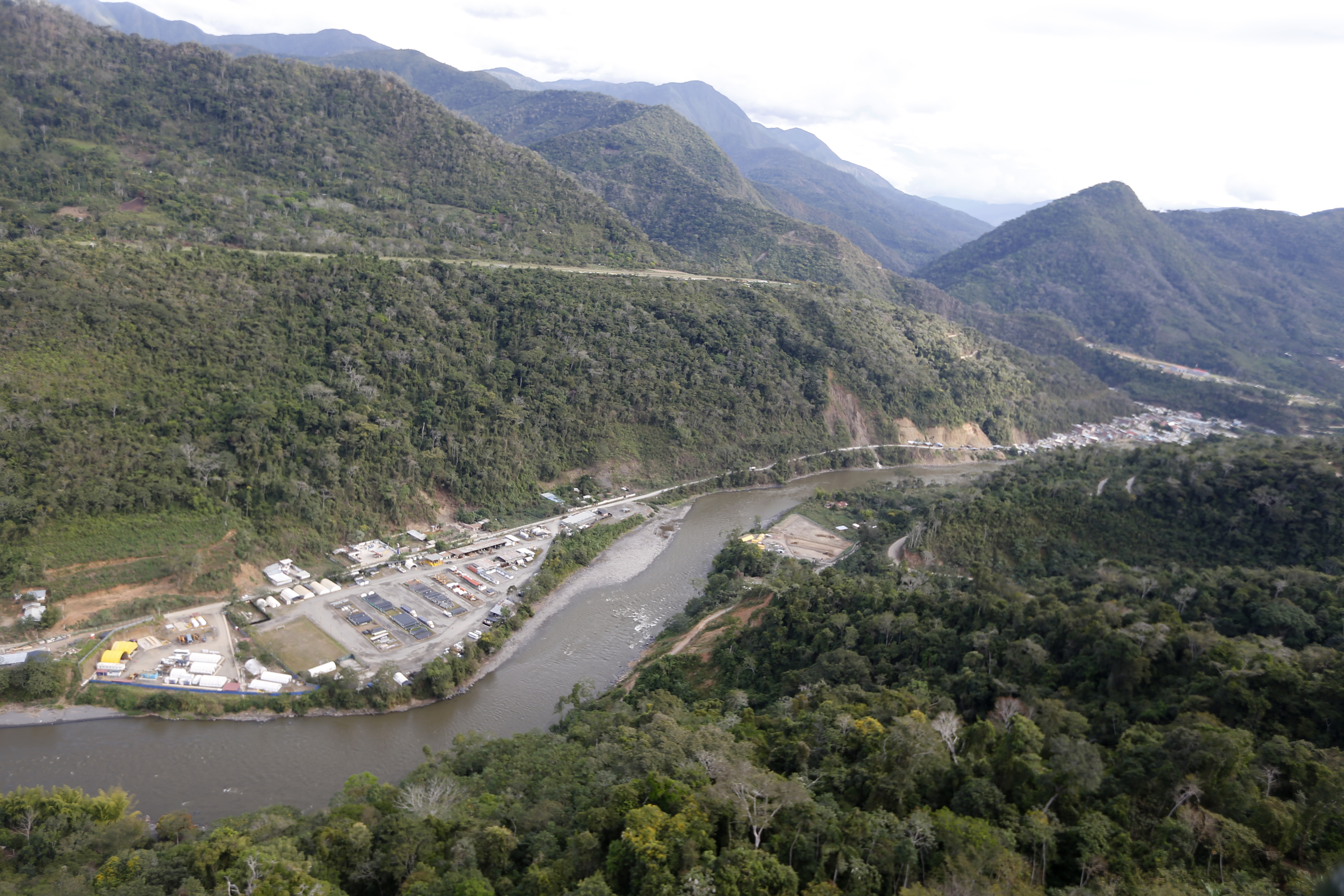
The Malvinas Processing Plant on the Urubamba River.

Megantoni is the location of most of the Camisea Gas Field, a controversial four billion dollar project exploiting natural gas resources. The Malvinas Gas Processing Plant, 13 kilometres (8.1 miles) south of Camisea, produces natural gas and sends it via a pipeline which crosses the Andes and continues westward to the Pacific Ocean coast. The gas is consumed domestically and exported from the port of Pisco.

Exploration for natural gas has extended into the protected and indigenous lands of Megantoni posing a risk to the survival and livelihoods of the indigenous people and the tropical forests. "Inevitably," in the opinion of one scholar, a road will be built to connect Megantoni to the rest of Peru and stimulate an influx of farmers, miners, and drug traffickers who will encroach on the forests and indigenous people of the district.
