= Acopia District =

Coordinates: 14°03′32″S 71°29′38″W

Acopia
- District
- Interactive map of Acopia
- Country: Peru
- Region: Cusco
- Province: Acomayo
- Founded: November 11, 1944
- Capital: Acopia

Government
  - Mayor: Vital Geri Layme

Area
  - Total: 91.72 km^{2} (35.41 sq mi)
- Elevation: 3,715 m (12,188 ft)

Population (2005 census)
  - Total: 2,603
  - Density: 28.38/km^{2} (73.50/sq mi)
- Time zone: UTC-5 (PET)
- UBIGEO: 080202

Acopia District is one of seven districts of the province Acomayo in Peru.

== Ethnic groups ==
The people in the district are mainly indigenous citizens of Quechua descent. Quechua is the language which the majority of the population (91.42%) learnt to speak in childhood, 8.54% of the residents started speaking using the Spanish language (2007 Peru Census).
