= Rondocan District =

Coordinates: 13.7917°S 71.7928°W

Rondocan
- District
- Interactive map of Rondocan
- Country: Peru
- Region: Cusco
- Province: Acomayo
- Founded: January 2, 1857
- Capital: Rondocan

Government
  - Mayor: Vidal Anara Rafaile

Area
  - Total: 180.22 km^{2} (69.58 sq mi)
- Elevation: 3,365 m (11,040 ft)

Population (2005 census)
  - Total: 3,668
  - Density: 20.35/km^{2} (52.71/sq mi)
- Time zone: UTC-5 (PET)
- UBIGEO: 080206

Rondocan District is one of seven districts of the province Acomayo in Peru.

== Geography ==
One of the highest peaks of the district is P'isqu Urqu at approximately 4,600 m (15,100 ft). Other mountains are listed below:

- Hatun Urqu
- Ichhu Urqu
- Kuntur Sayana
- Khuchi Aka
- Luychu
- Llaqta K'uchu
- Milla Punta
- Mullak'a Urqu
- Pariwana
- Pitu Urqu
- Qucha Kunka
- Runtu Urqu
- Taka Raqay

== Ethnic groups ==
The people in the district are mainly indigenous citizens of Quechua descent. Quechua is the language which the majority of the population (97.42%) learnt to speak in childhood, 1.82% of the residents started speaking using the Spanish language (2007 Peru Census).
