= Waqrapukara =

Archaeological site in Peru

Coordinates: 14°1′22.3″S 71°41′37″W

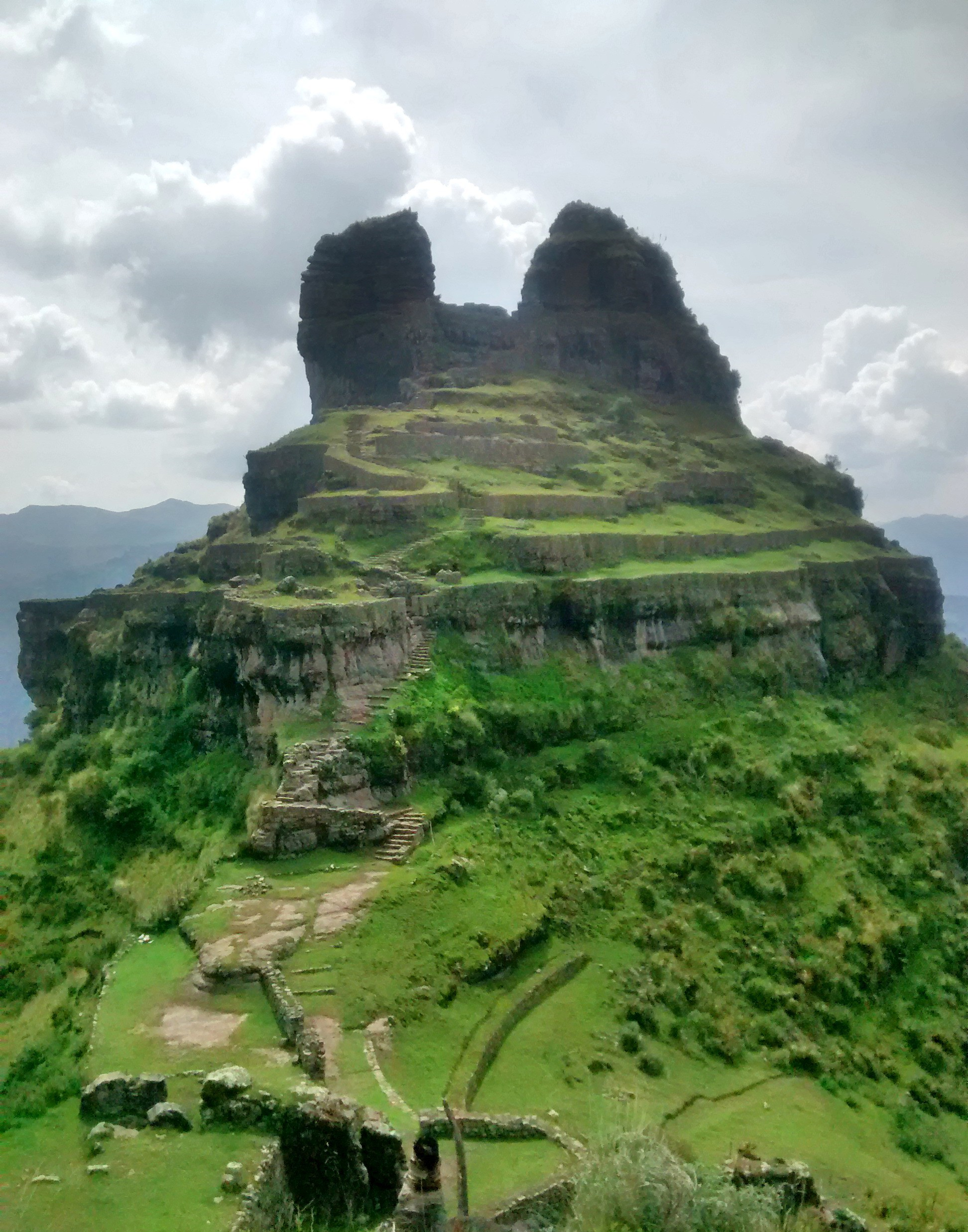
- Interactive map of Waqrapukara
- Cultures: Inca
- Location: Peru, Cusco Region
- Region: Andes

Site notes
- Height: 4,140 m (13,580 ft)

Waqrapukara or Waqra Pukara (possibly from Quechua waqra horn, pukara fortress, "horn fortress") is an archaeological site in Peru located in the Cusco Region, Acomayo Province, Acos District. It lies near the Apurímac River. At 4,300 metres (14,100 ft) above sea level. It was built by the Canchis, who constructed the circular buildings, and later conquered by the Incas. It was declared a National Cultural Heritage Site by the Ministry of Culture in July 2017. The building is said to be an Inca sanctuary.
