= Sangarará District =

Coordinates: 13.957°S 71.605°W

Sangarará
- District
- Interactive map of Sangarará
- Country: Peru
- Region: Cusco
- Province: Acomayo
- Founded: November 23, 1861
- Capital: Sangarará

Government
  - Mayor: Herbert Luna Fernandez

Area
  - Total: 78.29 km^{2} (30.23 sq mi)
- Elevation: 3,763 m (12,346 ft)

Population (2005 census)
  - Total: 3,657
  - Density: 46.71/km^{2} (121.0/sq mi)
- Time zone: UTC-5 (PET)
- UBIGEO: 080207

Sangarará District is one of seven districts of the province Acomayo in Peru.

== Ethnic groups ==
The people in the district are mainly indigenous citizens of Quechua descent. Quechua is the language which the majority of the population (88.11%) learnt to speak in childhood, 11.20% of the residents started speaking using the Spanish language (2007 Peru Census).
