= Omacha District =

Coordinates: 14.0695°S 71.7552°W

Omacha Umacha
- District
- Interactive map of Omacha
- Country: Peru
- Region: Cusco
- Province: Paruro
- Founded: January 2, 1857
- Capital: Omacha

Government
  - Mayor: Ronald Oviedo Huamani

Area
  - Total: 436.21 km^{2} (168.42 sq mi)
- Elevation: 3,874 m (12,710 ft)

Population (2017 census)
  - Total: 5,443
  - Density: 12.48/km^{2} (32.32/sq mi)
- Time zone: UTC-5 (PET)
- UBIGEO: 081006

Omacha District is one of nine districts of the province Paruro in Peru.

== Geography ==
One of the highest peaks of the district is Wayllayuq at approximately 4,600 m (15,100 ft). Other mountains are listed below:

- Anta Pata
- Ch'iyar Jaqhi
- Kancha Q'asa
- Kimsa Chata
- Kunturi
- Pilluni
- Puyka
- P'unqu Q'asa
- Qiwiña
- Qullpa
- Qullu Ruphasqa
- Saywa
- Suyt'u
- Uma Qucha
- Wallata
- Wik'uña

== Political division ==
=== Localities ===
- Omacha
  - Antayaje
  - Pichaca
  - Coyani
  - Perccacata
- Osccollopata
  - Huasquillay
  - Ccaccasiqui
  - Antapata
  - Sauro
- Antapallpa
  - Chapina
  - Tahui
  - Omashuaylla
  - Barrio Cotacpampa
  - Barrio Rosaspata
  - Antaparara
  - Parcco
  - Ancascocha
  - Vista Alegre
- Checcapucara
  - Hatuncancha
  - Colchapampa
  - Ticamayo
- Sahua Sahua
  - kcurpa-Japucalla
  - Cercopampa
  - Laca Laca
  - Huaytahui
  - Huancarani
  - Huanacopampa
- Quille
  - K'urpa
  - Omala
  - Chiuca
- Huillcuyo
  - Huillcuyo Alto
  - Joloña
- Huillque
- Hacca
  - Paclla

== Ethnic groups ==
The people in the district are mainly indigenous citizens of Quechua descent. Quechua is the language which the majority of the population (94.70%) learnt to speak in childhood, 5.13% of the residents started speaking using the Spanish language (2007 Peru Census).
