= Paccaritambo District =

Coordinates: 13.7574°S 71.9556°W

Paccaritambo Paqariq Tampu
- District
- Interactive map of Paccaritambo
- Country: Peru
- Region: Cusco
- Province: Paruro
- Founded: October 22, 1963
- Capital: Paccaritambo or Paccarectambo

Government
  - Mayor: Wilberth Villacorta Villacorta

Area
  - Total: 142.61 km^{2} (55.06 sq mi)
- Elevation: 3,584 m (11,759 ft)

Population (2005 census)
  - Total: 2,551
  - Density: 17.89/km^{2} (46.33/sq mi)
- Time zone: UTC-5 (PET)
- UBIGEO: 081007

Paccaritambo District or Paccarectambo District is one of nine districts of the province Paruro in Peru.

== Ethnic groups ==
The people in the district are mainly indigenous citizens of Quechua descent. Quechua is the language which the majority of the population (92.52%) learnt to speak in childhood, 6.83% of the residents started speaking using the Spanish language (2007 Peru Census).

== See also ==
- Mawk'allaqta
- Paqariq Tampu
