= Cosio =

Cosio may refer to:

- Cosio di Arroscia, an Italian municipality in the Province of Imperia, Liguria
- Cosio Valtellino, an Italian municipality in the Province of Sondrio, Lombardy
- Cosío, a Mexican municipality in the state of Aguascalientes
- Cosío, a Mexican town and municipal seat in the state of Aguascalientes
- José Gabriel Cosio, a Peruvian scholar
