= Ramón A. Chaparro =

Peruvian politician (1830–1906)

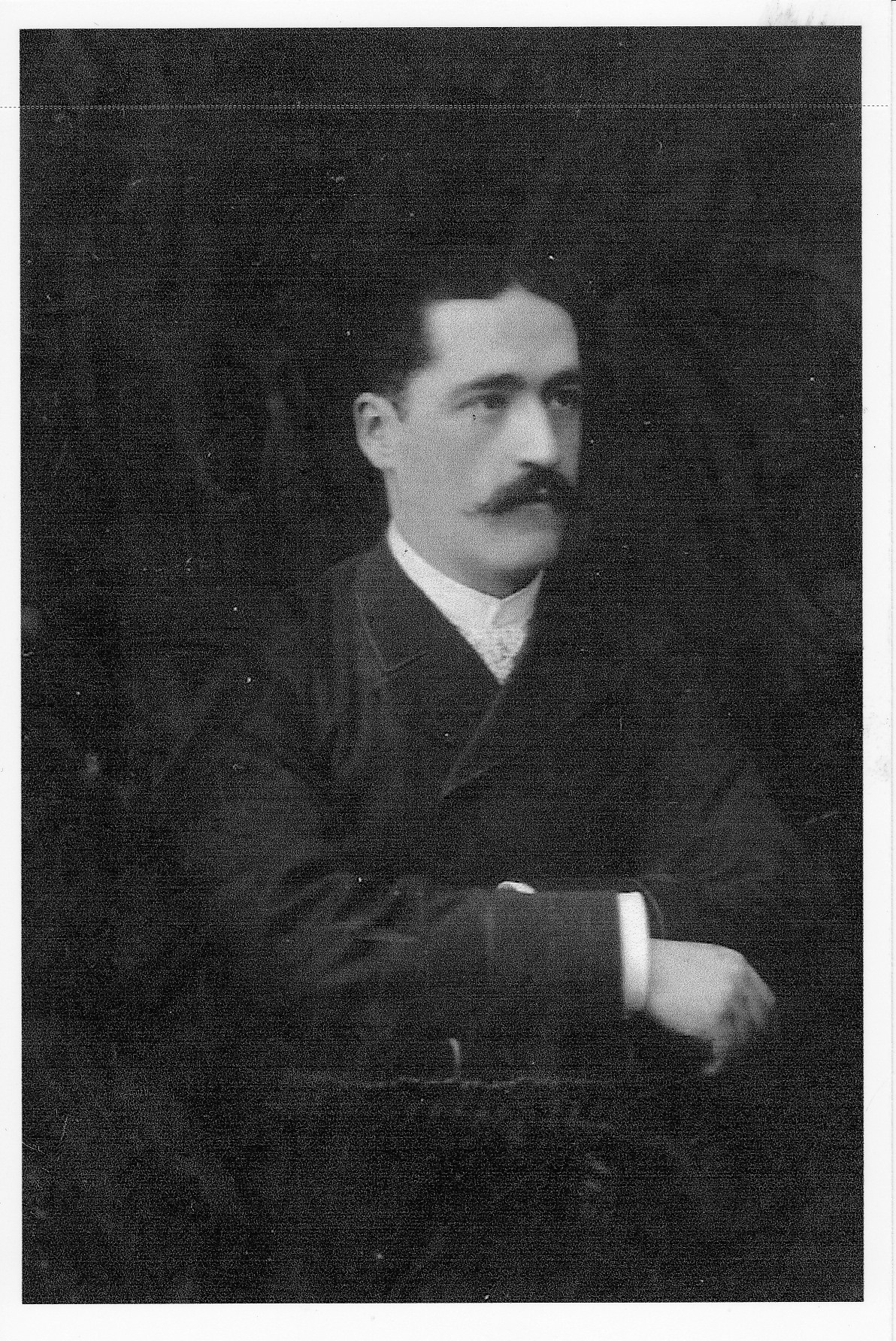

President of the Chamber of Deputies
- In office December 5, 1895 – January 16, 1896
- Preceded by: Augusto Durand Maldonado
- Succeeded by: Augusto Durand Maldonado

Personal details
- Born: August 31, 1862 Huanoquite, Peru
- Died: March 14, 1902 Cuzco, Peru
- Parent(s): José Lucas Chaparro; Paula Echave

Military service
- Battles/wars: Peruvian Civil War (1894–5)

Ramón Arístides Chaparro Echave (August 31, 1862, in Molle Molle – March 14, 1902, in Cuzco) was a Peruvian politician. He served as interim President of the Chamber of Deputies from 1895 to 1896, and was the youngest deputy of the history of Cuzco at the time.

== Biography ==
He was born on the Molle Molle hacienda in Huanoquite District, Paruro Province, in the department of Cuzco. His parents were José Lucas Chaparro, who had been a constituent deputy in 1855 and 1867, and Paula Echave. He studied at the Colegio Peruano. Like his father, he was an ardent Pierolist and participated in the capture of the city of Cuzco within the framework of the Peruvian Civil War of 1894–1895. As a colonel, he also fought in the battle of Cabanillas.

He was elected deputy for the province of Paruro in the congress held in Arequipa in 1883 by President Lizardo Montero after the Peruvian defeat in the war with Chile and re-elected in 1886. After the Civil War of 1884–1885, he was elected deputy for the province of Cuzco in 1895, while his father was elected for the province of Paruro.

During his administration, Chaparro signed the Electoral Law enacted in 1896 as president of the Chamber of Deputies despite being only the second vice president because the regular members of the chamber did not want to sign said law whose debate had not yet concluded.

He died of hepatitis in Cuzco in 1902 at the age of 39.
