= Pumawasi (Paruro) =

Mountain in Peru

- Location within Peru

Highest point
- Elevation: 4,427.8 m (14,527 ft)
- Coordinates: 13°53′6″S 71°52′33″W

Naming
- Language of name: Quechua

Geography
- Location: Peru, Cusco Region, Paruro Province
- Parent range: Andes

Pumawasi (Quechua puma cougar, puma, wasi house, "puma house", Hispanicized spelling Pumahuasi) is a mountain in the Cusco Region in Peru, about 4,089 metres (13,415 ft) high. It is situated in the Paruro Province, Colcha District.
