= Tawqa (disambiguation) =

Tawqa or Tawqan (Quechua tawqa heap, pile, -n a suffix, Hispanicized spellings Tauca, Taucán) may refer to:

- Tauca District, a district and its seat in the Ancash Region, Peru
- Lake Tauca, a former lake in Bolivia
- Tawqa, a mountain in the Calca Province, Cusco Region, Peru
- Tawqan, a mountain in the Ancash Region, Peru

== See also ==
- Tawqa Urqu, a mountain in the Paruro Province, Cusco Region, Peru
