= Acomayo River (Cusco) =

River

- Etymology: Quechua

Location
- Country: Peru
- Region: Cusco Region

Physical characteristics
- Mouth: Apurímac River
  - coordinates: 13°57′55″S 71°44′30″W

Acomayo River (possibly from Quechua aqu sand, mayu river, "sand river") is a river in Peru, located in the Cusco Region, Acomayo Province, in the districts Acomayo and Acos. It is a right tributary of the Apurímac River. The confluence is southwest of the town Acomayo.
