= Pomacanchi District =

Coordinates: 14.037°S 71.571°W

Pomacanchi Pumaqanchi
- District
- Interactive map of Pomacanchi
- Country: Peru
- Region: Cusco
- Province: Acomayo
- Founded: January 2, 1857
- Capital: Pomacanchi

Government
  - Mayor: Nestor Natalicio Luna Farfan

Area
  - Total: 275.56 km^{2} (106.39 sq mi)
- Elevation: 3,679 m (12,070 ft)

Population (2005 census)
  - Total: 8,295
  - Density: 30.10/km^{2} (77.96/sq mi)
- Time zone: UTC-5 (PET)
- UBIGEO: 080205

Pomacanchi District is one of seven districts of the Acomayo Province in Peru.

== Geography ==
One of the highest peaks of the district is Puka Kancha at 4,400 m (14,400 ft). Other mountains are listed below:

- Anka Tiyana
- Ch'uñuna Papa
- Hatun Ñan
- Kunka
- Kuntur Sunkha
- Minas Pata
- Pawkarani
- Pilluni
- Pukara
- Qhuyani
- Salla Salla
- Sillu Qaqa

== Ethnic groups ==
The people in the district are mainly indigenous citizens of Quechua descent. Quechua is the language which the majority of the population (89.89%) learnt to speak in childhood, 9.94% of the residents started speaking using the Spanish language (2007 Peru Census).

== Climate ==
Climate data for Pomacanchi, elevation 3,690 m (12,110 ft), (1991–2020)
Month	Jan	Feb	Mar	Apr	May	Jun	Jul	Aug	Sep	Oct	Nov	Dec	Year
Mean daily maximum °C (°F)	16.7 (62.1)	16.6 (61.9)	16.7 (62.1)	17.0 (62.6)	17.2 (63.0)	17.0 (62.6)	16.8 (62.2)	17.8 (64.0)	18.3 (64.9)	18.4 (65.1)	18.6 (65.5)	17.4 (63.3)	17.4 (63.3)
Mean daily minimum °C (°F)	5.4 (41.7)	5.5 (41.9)	5.2 (41.4)	3.7 (38.7)	0.8 (33.4)	−0.9 (30.4)	−1.3 (29.7)	0.0 (32.0)	2.6 (36.7)	4.2 (39.6)	4.6 (40.3)	5.1 (41.2)	2.9 (37.3)
Average precipitation mm (inches)	152.4 (6.00)	146.6 (5.77)	114.2 (4.50)	47.8 (1.88)	8.8 (0.35)	2.5 (0.10)	4.6 (0.18)	7.7 (0.30)	20.3 (0.80)	63.5 (2.50)	92.2 (3.63)	136.6 (5.38)	797.2 (31.39)
Source: National Meteorology and Hydrology Service of Peru

== See also ==
- Waqra Pukara
