= Mawk'allaqta, Paruro =

Archaeological site in Peru

Mawk'allaqta
- Maukallaqta
- Interactive map of Mawk'allaqta
- 13°42′17″S 71°58′05″W
- Cultures: Inca
- Location: Paccaritambo, Paruro, Cusco, Peru
- Region: Andes

Site notes
- Elevation: 3,397 m (11,145 ft)
- Public access: y

Mawk'allaqta or Mawk'a Llaqta (Quechua mawk'a ancient, llaqta place (village, town, city, country, nation), "ancient place", hispanicized and mixed spellings Mauka Llacta, Mauka Llaqta, Maukallaqta) is an archaeological site in Peru. It is located in the Cusco Region, Paruro Province, Paccaritambo District, near Mullipampa (Mollebamba).
