= José Gabriel Cosio =

Peruvian scholar and professor

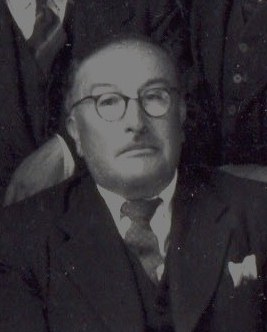

Rector of the National University of San Antonio Abad in Cuzco
- In office 1950–1951
- Preceded by: Rafael Aguilar Páez
- Succeeded by: Luis Felipe Paredes Obando

Personal details
- Born: José Gabriel Cosío Medina; March 18, 1887 Accha, Peru
- Died: November 23, 1960 (aged 73) Lima, Peru
- Spouse: Rebeca Zamalloa
- Parent(s): Timoteo Cosío Calderón; Juana Medina
- Relatives: Felix Cosío Medina (brother)
- Education: UNSAAC

José Gabriel Cosío Medina (Accha, March 18, 1887 – Lima, November 23, 1960) was a Peruvian scholar and professor. As a representative of the Peruvian government, he supervised the Yale Peruvian Expedition in 1912 led by Hiram Bingham.

He was part of the Cusco School, a generation of Cusco students who grouped around regionalism, indigenism, and decentralism and is considered the most brilliant generation produced in Cusco during the 20th century and the one that had the longest period of influence. His brother Félix Cosío Medina was also part of this group.

== Biography ==
He was born in the district of Accha, province of Paruro, department of Cusco. He was a student of philosophy, history, and literature at the National University of Saint Anthony the Abbot in Cuzco, forming part of the generation known as the Escuela Cusqueña (Cuzco School). He participated in the 1909 university reform, and from 1912 he was part of the group that published the Revista Universitaria founded by the president of the University of Cusco, Albert Giesecke, along with other notable figures in the academic scene of Cusco at the time, such as Luis E. Valcárcel, José Uriel García, Rafael Aguilar Páez, Miguel Corazao, Humberto Luna Pacheco, Francisco Tamayo, José Mendizábal, and Luis Rafael Casanova.

In 1909, he began his career as a professor of Spanish and literature. He taught at the National University of San Antonio Abad of Cusco, San Carlos School in Puno, San Juan School in Trujillo, and the National School of Sciences and Arts of Cuzco. In 1912, he was a delegate of the Peruvian government and the Geographical Society of Lima on the scientific expedition of Yale University, led by Hiram Bingham in Machu Picchu. He was also a councilman for the Municipality of Cusco, an active member of the Public Welfare Society of Cusco, founder of the American Institute of Art, and president of the Rotary Club of Cusco.

He wrote several articles on architecture, history of Cusco, and its institutions, among other topics. He died on November 23, 1960, in the city of Lima.

== Sources ==
- Aparicio Vega, Manuel Jesús (2000). "Cuscología y sus orígenes". Senri Ethnological Reports (in Spanish). 18.
- López Lenci, Yazmín (2004). "La creación de la Nación Peruana en las revistas culturales del Cusco (1910-1930)". Revista Iberoamericana (in Spanish). LXX (208–209): 697–720.
- Tamayo Herrera, José (1981). Historia Social del Cuzco Republicano (in Spanish). Lima: Editorial Universo.
