= Colcha District =

Colcha Qulcha
- District
- Location within Peru
- Country: Peru
- Region: Cusco
- Province: Paruro
- Founded: January 2, 1857
- Capital: Colcha

Government
  - Mayor: Remigio La Torre Duran

Area
  - Total: 139.98 km^{2} (54.05 sq mi)
- Elevation: 2,796 m (9,173 ft)

Population (2005 census)
  - Total: 1,357
  - Density: 9.694/km^{2} (25.11/sq mi)
- Time zone: UTC-5 (PET)
- UBIGEO: 081004

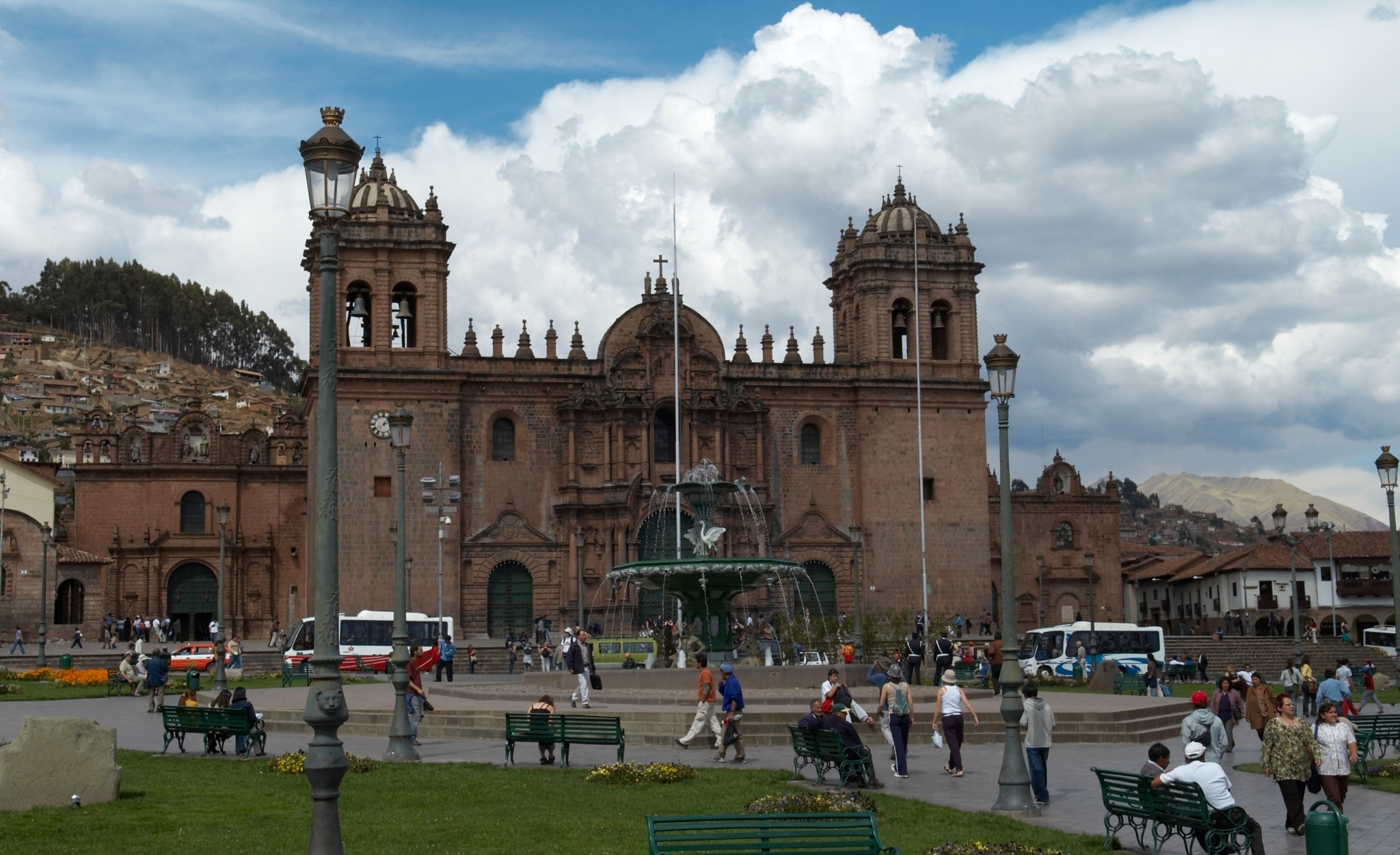
Cusco Cathedral

Colcha District is one of nine districts of the province Paruro, Peru.

== Ethnic groups ==
The people in the district are mainly indigenous citizens of Quechua descent. Quechua is the language which the majority of the population (95.49%) learn to speak in childhood, 4.35% of the residents started speaking using the Spanish language (2007 Peru Census).

== See also ==
- Pumawasi
