= Kuntur Sinqa (Paruro) =

Mountain in Peru

- Location within Peru

Highest point
- Elevation: 4,256.8 m (13,966 ft)
- Coordinates: 13°59′30″S 71°45′45″W

Naming
- Language of name: Quechua

Geography
- Location: Peru, Cusco Region, Paruro Province
- Parent range: Andes

Kuntur Sinqa (Quechua kuntur condor, sinqa, nose, "condor nose", also spelled Condorsenja) is a mountain in the Cusco Region in Peru, about 4,256.8 metres (13,966 ft) high. It lies in the Paruro Province, Pillpinto District. Kuntur Sinqa is situated west of the Apurímac River.
