= Rafael Aguilar (disambiguation) =

Rafael Aguilar (1929–1995) was an Ecuadorian ballet dancer and choreographer.

Rafael Aguilar may also refer to:

- Rafael Aguilar Guajardo (1950–1993), Mexican narcotrafficker and commander in the federal police
- Rafael Aguilar Páez (1891–1972) Peruvian academic and politician, worked with José Gabriel Cosio in Cusco
- Rafael Aguilar Talamantes (1939–2016), Mexican politician, presidential candidate in 1994
- Rafael Aguilar (water polo) (born 1961), Spanish water polo player
