= Lake Asnacocha =

Lake in the Cusco region of Peru

- Location within Peru
- Location: Peru; Cusco Region
- Coordinates: 14°06′13″S 71°28′49″W

Lake Asnacocha (possibly from Quechua asna, asnaq foul-smelling, stinking, qucha lake) is a lake in Peru located in the Cusco Region, Acomayo Province, Mosoc Llacta District. It is situated southeast of Lake Pomacanchi.
