= Pongo de Mainique =

Feature of the Urubamba River, Peru

- Canyon
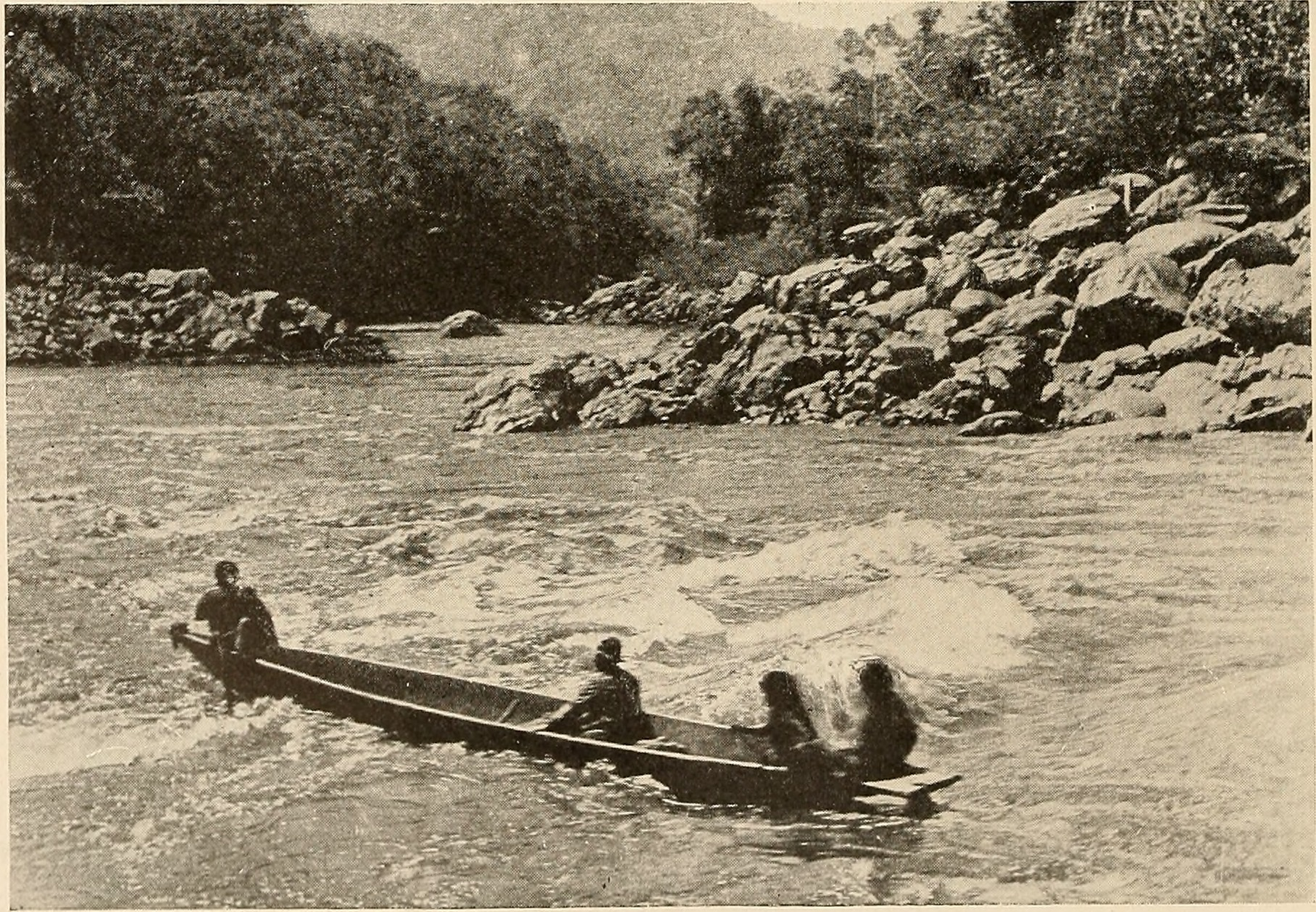
- Thirty-foot canoe in a rapid above Pongo de Mainique. (1916)

- Location within Peru
- Coordinates: 12°14′15.72″S 72°49′18.73″W
- Location: Peru; La Convención Province, Cuzco Echarate and Megantoni districts

Dimensions
  - Length: 3 kilometres (2 mi)
  - Width: 45 metres (50 yd)

The Pongo de Mainique ('gate' in Quechua) is a water gap (canyon) of the Urubamba River in Peru. Inside the water gap, the river is constricted to a width of 45 metres (50 yd). The Pongo de Mainique is 3 kilometres (2 mi) long. The elevation of the river is approximately 450 metres (1,480 ft). The steep cliffs on each side of the river rise sharply to mountains with elevations of more than 1,200 metres (3,900 ft).

The Pongo de Mainique is the only break in the Vilcabamba mountain range. It also divides the Urubamba River (a headwater of the Amazon River) between the turbulent Upper Urubamba and the more placid Lower Urubamba. It is considered the most dangerous whitewater pass on the Urubamba; however, many boats traverse it, depending on seasonal river conditions. According to legend, the river was once crossed by the so-called Inca Bridge, although the Pongo was outside the boundaries of the Inca Empire. The bridge no longer exists.

The Pongo de Mainique is a global biodiversity hotspot. According to the Wildlife Conservation Society, "the lowland rainforests and mid-montane cloud forests within a radius of five miles (8 km) of the Pongo possibly comprise the single most biologically-diverse site on the face of the Earth."

The rapids of the Pongo de Mainique were used as a filming location for key scenes of Werner Herzog's 1982 film Fitzcarraldo starring Klaus Kinski. In a 2006 survey of "15 of the world's top travel writers" by The Observer, Monty Python actor and BBC travel documentarist Michael Palin named it his "favourite place in the world".
