= Huanoquite District =

Coordinates: 13.6826°S 72.0164°W

Huanoquite Wanukiti
- District
- Interactive map of Huanoquite
- Country: Peru
- Region: Cusco
- Province: Paruro
- Capital: Huanoquite

Government
  - Mayor: Tomas Quispe Antitupa

Area
  - Total: 362.67 km^{2} (140.03 sq mi)
- Elevation: 3,396 m (11,142 ft)

Population (2005 census)
  - Total: 5,920
  - Density: 16.3/km^{2} (42.3/sq mi)
- Time zone: UTC-5 (PET)
- UBIGEO: 081005

Huanoquite District is one of nine districts of the province Paruro in Peru.

== Ethnic groups ==
The people in the district are mainly indigenous citizens of Quechua descent. Quechua is the language which the majority of the population (94.33%) learnt to speak in childhood, 5.21% of the residents started speaking using the Spanish language (2007 Peru Census).

== Notable people ==
- Ramón A. Chaparro (1830–1906), politician
