= Kuntur Sinqa (La Convención) =

Kuntur Sinqa (Quechua kuntur condor, sinqa nose, "condor nose", also spelled Condor Sencca, Condorsencca) is a viewpoint in Peru. It is situated in the Cusco Region, La Convención Province, Echarate District. The viewpoint is a kind of balcony made out of concrete and metal which runs around a rock. It lies about 500 metres (1,640 ft) above the Turuntuypata River (Torontoypata) and it is about 100 metres (328 ft) long. The balcony of Kuntur Sinqa is considered one of the outstanding works of engineering of the Cusco Region.
