= Pillpinto District =

Coordinates: 13.9538°S 71.7599°W

Pillpinto Pillpintu
- District
- Interactive map of Pillpinto; Pillpintu
- Country: Peru
- Region: Cusco
- Province: Paruro
- Founded: December 11, 1963
- Capital: Pillpinto

Government
  - Mayor: Jeferson David Camazala Aico

Area
  - Total: 79.13 km^{2} (30.55 sq mi)
- Elevation: 2,853 m (9,360 ft)

Population (2005 census)
  - Total: 1,285
  - Density: 16.24/km^{2} (42.06/sq mi)
- Time zone: UTC-5 (PET)
- UBIGEO: 081008

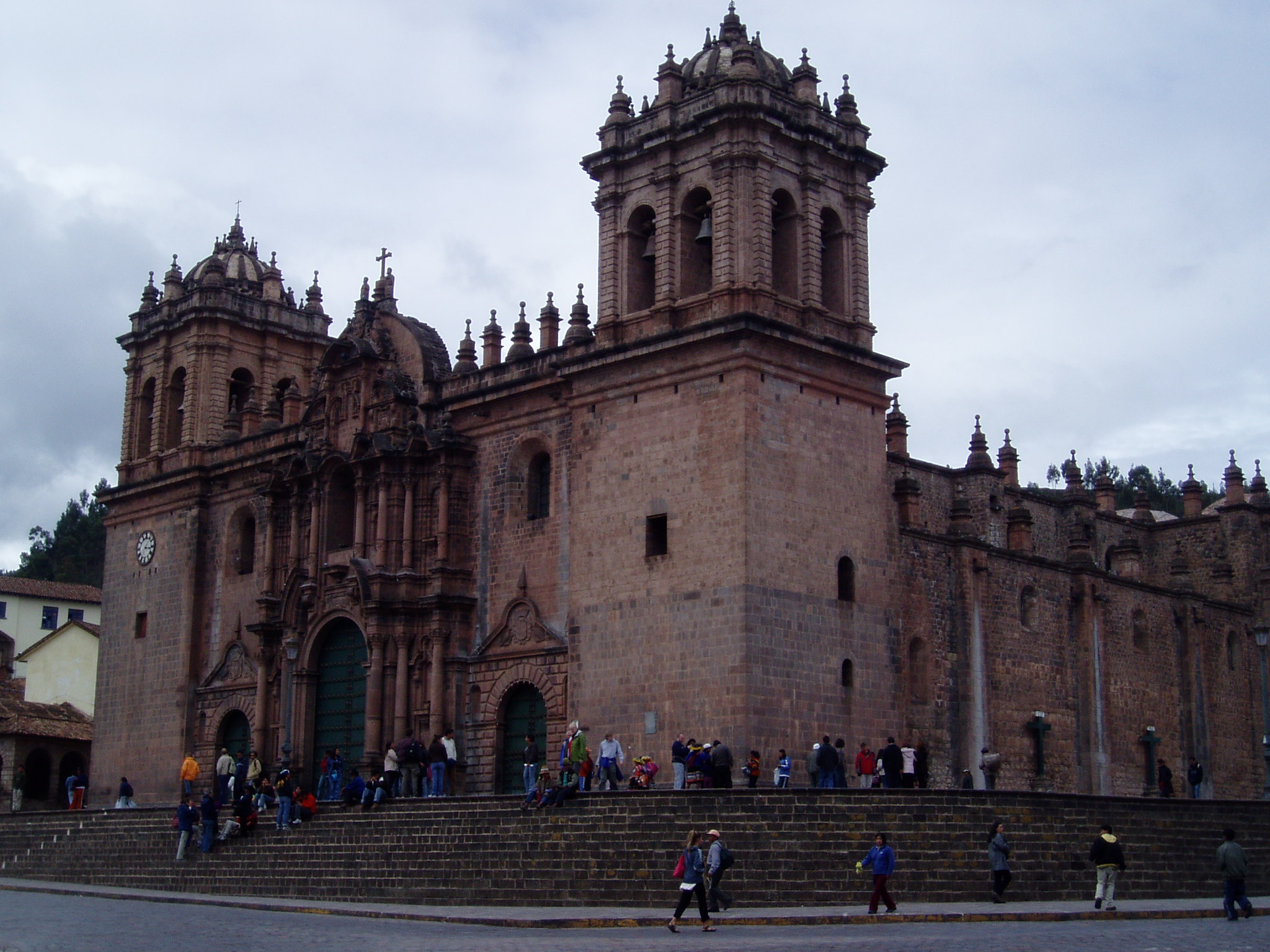
Cusco Cathedral in Peru.

Pillpinto District is one of nine districts of the province Paruro in Peru.

== Ethnic groups ==
The people in the district are mainly indigenous citizens of Quechua descent. Quechua is the language which the majority of the population (94.02%) learnt to speak in childhood, 5.67% of the residents started speaking using the Spanish language (2007 Peru Census).

== See also ==
- Kuntursinqa
