= Pedro Mas =

Peruvian soldier and administrator

Prefect of Cuzco
- In office May 1894 – April 1895
- President: Andrés A. Cáceres
- Succeeded by: Lucio Samuel Chaparro

Prefect of Junín
- In office May 1885 – April 1887
- President: Andrés A. Cáceres

Prefect of Ayacucho
- In office 1883–1885
- President: Miguel Iglesias

Prefect of Ica
- In office May 1882 – April 1883
- President: Miguel Iglesias

Personal details
- Born: 19th century Peru
- Died: after 1895 Bolivia

Military service
- Allegiance: Peru
- Branch/service: Peruvian Army
- Years of service: ?–1895
- Rank: Brigadier general
- Battles/wars: Civil War of 1884–5; Civil War of 1894–5

Pedro Mas was a brigadier general of the Peruvian Army and a controversial politician who served as prefect of the departments of Cuzco, Junín, Ayacucho and Ica. During his tenure in Cuzco, he was ousted during the Peruvian Civil War of 1894–1895, fleeing to La Paz.

== Career ==
In 1882, after the entry of Andrés Avelino Cáceres to the city of Huamanga—until then occupied by Nicolás de Piérola—during the War of the Pacific, the trial of Mas, who had held the position of Prefect of Ica, was ordered, as he had committed abuses in the towns of Nazca and Palpa.

After the rise to power of Miguel Iglesias, Pedro Mas was appointed Prefect of Ayacucho in 1883 and during his administration he ordered the second closure of the San Cristóbal of Huamanga University on January 31, 1885. By Law of April 21, 1885, the Congress of Peru promoted Pedro Mas to Brigadier General. During the civil war of 1884 and 1885, Más, who held the position of prefect of Junín, was part of the Iglesista side after the end of the War of the Pacific. After the first Cacerist defeat in Lima, Pedro Mas led a division of the Iglesista Army, known as the "Pacificadora del Centro" with the purpose of putting the towns of the departments of Junín and Huancavelica under Iglesias' control. Between November 1884 and February 1885, the "Pacificadora del Centro" found effective resistance in the indigenous peasant guerrillas from Huancayo to Huancavelica and Huanta, from Ayacucho to Acobamba to Chongos Alto.

In 1894 he was appointed by President Andrés A. Cáceres as prefect of Cuzco and commander of the Southern Army, the army of about 2,000 men that would defend the Cacerista regime in the departments of Puno and Cuzco during the Civil War of 1894 and 1895. During his administration, he established a tyrannical military government that banished civilians opposed to the government of Cáceres to Taquile Island, in Lake Titicaca, but imposed quotas and committed robberies directed by him and executed by the subprefect Antonio Marzo and the head of the gendarmes Felipe Santiago Masías, who imposed terror on the people of Cuzco.

The Mas regime generated the organization of Pierolist Montoneras led by various cuzqueños, such as David Samanez Ocampo, and José Lucas Chaparro who, leaving from Urubamba Province, took the city on April 3, 1895. Pedro Mas, hearing of the fall of the Cácerista regime on March 17, 1895, in Lima, fled towards La Paz, Bolivia, taking with him the money from the Fiscal Fund. He was formally dismissed from his position on April 4.

== See also ==
- Peruvian Civil War of 1894–1895
