= Hatun Urqu (Acomayo) =

Mountain in Peru

- Location within Peru

Highest point
- Elevation: 4,200 m (13,800 ft)
- Coordinates: 13°52′19″S 71°43′55″W

Naming
- Language of name: Quechua

Geography
- Location: Peru, Cusco Region, Acomayo Province
- Parent range: Andes

Hatun Urqu (Quechua hatun big, urqu, mountain, "big mountain", Hispanicized spelling Jatun Orjo) is a mountain in the Cusco Region in Peru, about 4,200 metres (13,780 ft) high. It is situated in the Acomayo Province, on the border of the districts Acomayo, Acos and Rondocan. Hatun Urqu lies south-west of the mountain Pisqu Urqu.

There is an intermittent stream south of Hatun Urqu named Saramayu (Quechua for "maize river", Saramayo). It flows to the north-west as a right affluent of the Apurímac River.
