= Maranniyuq =

Mountain in Peru

- Location within Peru

Highest point
- Elevation: 4,520 m (14,830 ft)
- Coordinates: 13°58′59″S 71°40′35″W

Naming
- Language of name: Quechua

Geography
- Location: Peru, Cusco Region, Acomayo Province
- Parent range: Andes

Maranniyuq (Quechua maran batan or grindstone, -ni, -yuq, suffixes, "the one with a grindstone", also spelled Marannioj) is a mountain in the Cusco Region in Peru, about 4,520 metres (14,829 ft) high. It is situated in the Acomayo Province, on the border of the districts Acomayo and Acos.

An intermittent stream named Paqlla Wayq'u originates south of Maranniyuq. It flows to the west as a right affluent of the Apurímac River.
