= Chapar =

Chapar may refer to:

- Chapar, Azerbaijan
- Chapar, Dhubri, Assam, India
- Chapar, West Azerbaijan, Iran
- Chapar, Zanjan, Iran
- Chapar, Pakistan
- Chapar Khan, descendant of Genghis Khan, leader of the House of Ogedei
