= José Lucas Chaparro =

Peruvian politician (1830–1906)

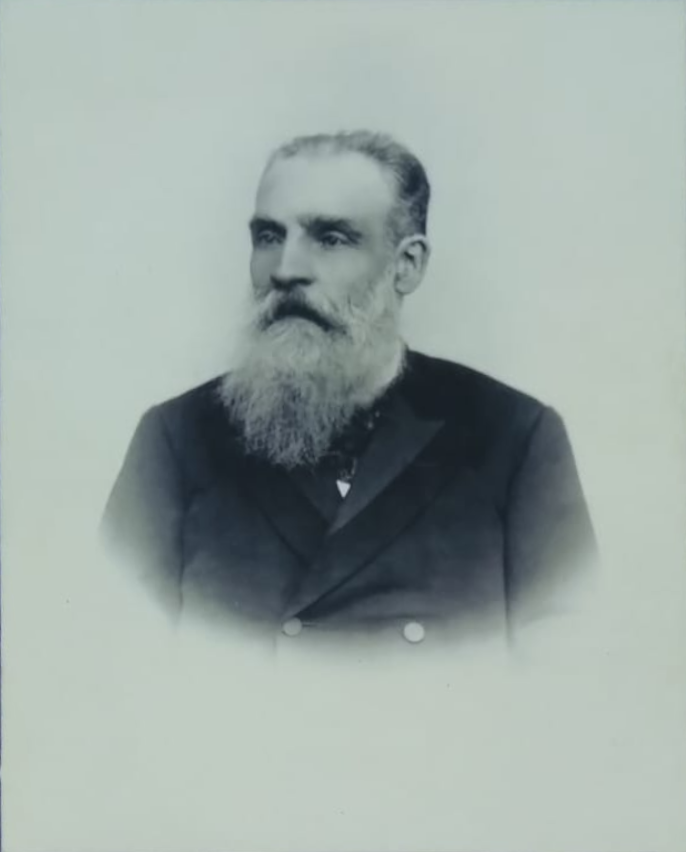

Personal details
- Born: 1830; Cuzco, Peru
- Died: November 14, 1906; Cuzco, Peru
- Spouse: Paula Echave
- Children: 14, including Ramón

Military service
- Battles/wars: Peruvian Civil War (1894–5)

José Lucas Chaparro Vizcarra (Cuzco; 1830 — November 14, 1906) was a Peruvian politician.

== Biography ==
Born in Cuzco, he was a member of the National Convention representing Urubamba Province between 1855 and 1857 which, during the second government of Ramón Castilla, drafted the Constitution of 1856, the sixth that governed the country.

In 1863 he held the position of subprefect of Paruro Province. He was elected member of the Constituent Congress of 1867 for the province of Paruro during the government of Mariano Ignacio Prado. This congress issued the Political Constitution of 1867, the eighth that governed the country, and which was only valid for five months: from August 1867 to January 1868.

Chaparro would be a conspicuous Pierolist leader in the region and leader of the Montoneras organised in the department of Cuzco. He actively participated in both the takeover of his hometown, alongside his children, and the expulsion of the city's prefect, Pedro Mas, during the civil war of 1894 and 1895 in which he, together with David Samanez Ocampo, led the Pierolist side. Peruvian historian José Tamayo Herrera describes the actions of the family as follows:

In Puno, Ramón Arístides Chaparro has organized a group that fights with the soldiers of Cáceres in Cabanillas. [...] The attackers formed a motley and curious legion of bearded men in outlandish dresses: the veteran of the Montoneros José Lucas Chaparro, an old man with a white beard whose years do not prevent him from pawning his rifle, the brilliant Ramón Arístides Chaparro—the youngest deputy in the entire history of Cuzco—colonel of Montoneros and main actor in the battle of Cabanillas, owner of unparalleled popularity [...].

— José Tamayo Herrera

His age and bearded appearance during the conflict is also highlighted by historian Luis E. Valcárcel.

In 1895, he was again elected deputy for the province of Paruro while his son Ramón was elected for the province of Cuzco.

He died in Cuzco in 1906 from lung disease.

Preceded by -	Deputy of the Republic of Peru; Representing Paruro; August 30, 1895–October 25, 1900	Succeeded by -
Preceded by -	Constituent Deputy of the Republic of Peru; Representing Paruro; May 15, 1867–November 15, 1867	Succeeded by -
Preceded by -	Constituent Deputy of the Republic of Peru; Representing Urubamba; July 14, 1855–November 2, 1857	Succeeded by -
