= Ccapi District =

Coordinates: 13.8526°S 72.0810°W

Ccapi Q'api
- District
- Interactive map of Ccapi
- Country: Peru
- Region: Cusco
- Province: Paruro
- Founded: January 2, 1857
- Capital: Ccapi

Government
  - Mayor: Ricardo Huarcaya Pumahualcca

Area
  - Total: 334.85 km^{2} (129.29 sq mi)
- Elevation: 3,185 m (10,449 ft)

Population (2005 census)
  - Total: 4,485
  - Density: 13.39/km^{2} (34.69/sq mi)
- Time zone: UTC-5 (PET)
- UBIGEO: 081003

Ccapi District is one of nine districts of the Paruro Province in Peru.

== Ethnic groups ==
The people in the district are mainly indigenous citizens of Quechua descent. Quechua is the language which the majority of the population (96.39%) learnt to speak in childhood, 3.25% of the residents started speaking using the Spanish language (2007 Peru Census).

== Geography ==
One of the highest peaks of the district is Tawqa Urqu at 4,624 m (15,171 ft). Other mountains are listed below:

- Apu Tayta
- Khipu
- Llama Kunka
- Pirqa
- Puma Ranra
- Q'illu
- Ruq'a
- Suyu Qaqa
- Wayta Qucha
