= Mosoc Llacta District =

Coordinates: 14°07′12″S 71°28′22″W

Mosoc Llacta Musuq Llaqta
- District
- Interactive map of Mosoc Llacta
- Country: Peru
- Region: Cusco
- Province: Acomayo
- Founded: November 11, 1964
- Capital: Mosoc Llacta

Government
  - Mayor: Florentino Soto Kille

Area
  - Total: 43.61 km^{2} (16.84 sq mi)
- Elevation: 3,802 m (12,474 ft)

Population (2005 census)
  - Total: 1,768
  - Density: 40.54/km^{2} (105.0/sq mi)
- Time zone: UTC-5 (PET)
- UBIGEO: 080204

Mosoc Llacta (from Quechua Musuq Llaqta, meaning "new town") is one of seven districts of the province Acomayo in Peru.

== Ethnic groups ==
The people in the district are mainly indigenous citizens of Quechua descent. Quechua is the language which the majority of the population (89.19%) learnt to speak in childhood, 10.75% of the residents started speaking using the Spanish language (2007 Peru Census).

== See also ==
- Asnaqucha
