= Yaurisque District =

Coordinates: 13.6635°S 71.9216°W

Yaurisque Yawrisqi
- District
- Interactive map of Yaurisque
- Country: Peru
- Region: Cusco
- Province: Paruro
- Founded: April 15, 1959
- Capital: Yaurisque

Government
  - Mayor: Juan De Dios Ramos Pariguana

Area
  - Total: 90.8 km^{2} (35.1 sq mi)
- Elevation: 3,330 m (10,930 ft)

Population (2005 census)
  - Total: 2,717
  - Density: 29.9/km^{2} (77.5/sq mi)
- Time zone: UTC-5 (PET)
- UBIGEO: 081009

Yaurisque District is one of nine districts of the province Paruro in Peru.

== Ethnic groups ==
The people in the district are mainly indigenous citizens of Quechua descent. Quechua is the language which the majority of the population (88.44%) learnt to speak in childhood, 11.32% of the residents started speaking using the Spanish language (2007 Peru Census).

== See also ==
- Wanakawri
