= Accha District =

Coordinates: 13.9711°S 71.8318°W

- District
- Interactive map of Accha District
- Country: Peru
- Region: Cusco
- Province: Paruro
- Capital: Accha

Government
  - Mayor: Ronald Nuñez Valdez

Area
  - Total: 244.75 km^{2} (94.50 sq mi)
- Elevation: 3,579 m (11,742 ft)

Population (2005 census)
  - Total: 3,879
  - Density: 15.85/km^{2} (41.05/sq mi)
- Time zone: UTC-5 (PET)
- UBIGEO: 081002

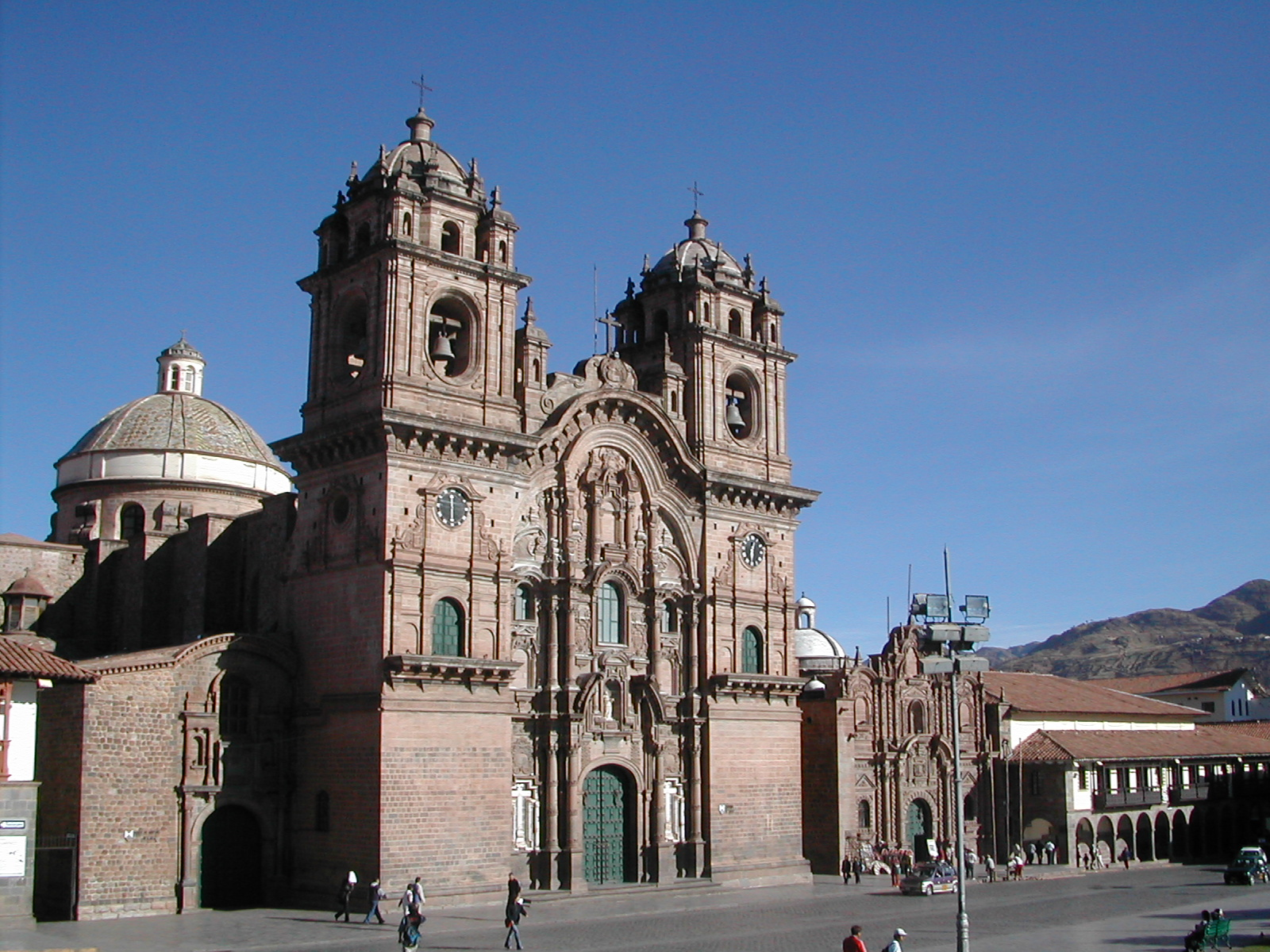

Accha district is one of nine districts of the province Paruro in Peru.

== Geography ==
One of the highest peaks of the district is Saywa at approximately 4,600 m (15,100 ft). Other mountains are listed below:

- Chuqichampi
- Kimsa Pukyu
- Kuntur Sinqa
- Ñuñu Quta
- Puma Urqu
- Q'iru
- Wank'a Marka Q'asa

== Ethnic groups ==
The people in the district are mainly indigenous citizens of Quechua descent. Quechua is the language which the majority of the population (90.20%) learnt to speak in childhood, 9.41% of the residents started speaking using the Spanish language (2007 Peru Census).
