= Tawqa Urqu =

Mountain in Peru

- Location within Peru

Highest point
- Elevation: 4,624 m (15,171 ft)
- Coordinates: 13°51′35″S 71°58′55″W

Naming
- Language of name: Quechua

Geography
- Location: Peru, Cusco Region, Paruro Province
- Parent range: Andes

Tawqa Urqu (Quechua tawqa heap, pile, urqu mountain, "heap mountain", Hispanicized spelling Tauca, Tauja Orjo) is a mountain in the Cusco Region in Peru, about 4,624 metres (15,171 ft) high. It is situated in the Paruro Province, Ccapi District, south of the Apurímac River.
