= Megantoni National Sanctuary =

Protected area in Peru

Coordinates: 12.2206°S 72.3614°W

- Santuario Nacional de Megantoni
- IUCN category III (natural monument or feature)
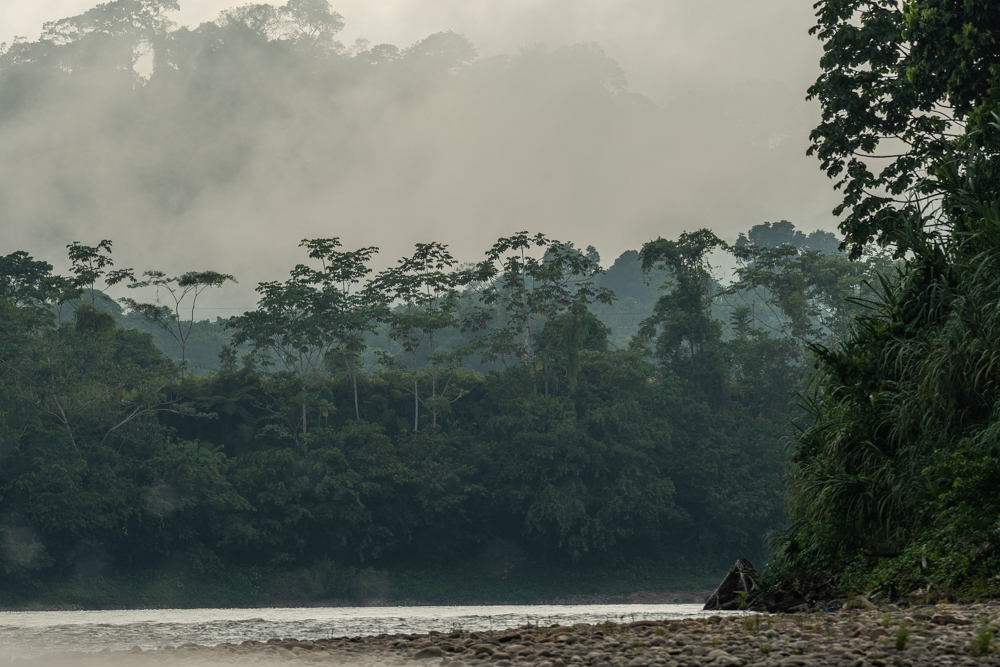
- Location: Peru; Cusco Region, La Convención Province, Echarate District
- Area: 215,868.96 ha (533,423.8 acres)
- Established: August 18, 2004
- Governing body: SERNANP
- Website: Santuario Nacional de Megantoni (in Spanish)

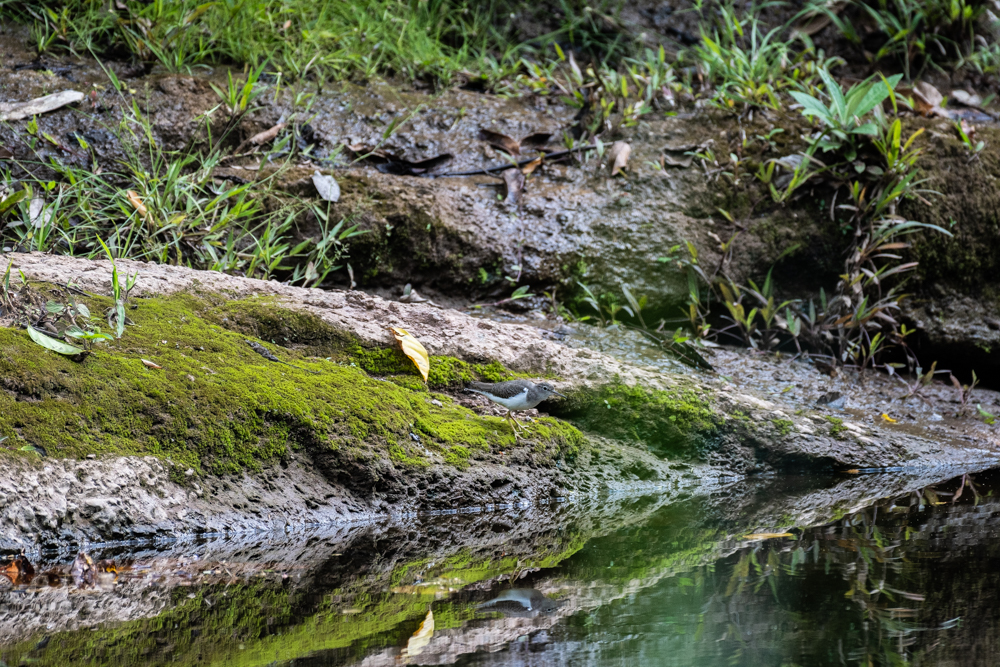
Megantoni National Sanctuary

Megantoni National Sanctuary (Santuario Nacional de Megantoni) is a protected area in Peru situated in the Cusco Region, La Convención Province, Echarate and Megantoni districts. It protects a part of the Peruvian Yungas ecoregion.

== See also ==
- Machiguenga Communal Reserve
- Natural and Cultural Peruvian Heritage
