= Acomayo District =

Coordinates: 13°55′08″S 71°41′06″W

Acomayo Aqumayu
- District
- Interactive map of Acomayo
- Country: Peru
- Region: Cusco
- Province: Acomayo
- Capital: Acomayo

Government
  - Mayor: Moises Ramos Villares

Area
  - Total: 141.27 km^{2} (54.54 sq mi)
- Elevation: 3,207 m (10,522 ft)

Population (2005 census)
  - Total: 5,062
  - Density: 35.83/km^{2} (92.80/sq mi)
- Time zone: UTC-5 (PET)
- UBIGEO: 080201

Acomayo or Aqumayu (Quechua aqu sand, mayu river, "sand river") is one of seven districts of the province Acomayo in Peru.

== Ethnic groups ==
The people in the district are mainly indigenous citizens of Quechua descent. Quechua is the language which the majority of the population (74.78%) learnt to speak in childhood, 25.18% of the residents started speaking using the Spanish language (2007 Peru Census).

== Climate ==
Climate data for Acomayo, elevation 3,212 m (10,538 ft), (1991–2020)
Month	Jan	Feb	Mar	Apr	May	Jun	Jul	Aug	Sep	Oct	Nov	Dec	Year
Mean daily maximum °C (°F)	20.4 (68.7)	20.2 (68.4)	20.3 (68.5)	20.9 (69.6)	21.1 (70.0)	20.8 (69.4)	20.7 (69.3)	21.7 (71.1)	22.2 (72.0)	22.5 (72.5)	22.6 (72.7)	21.3 (70.3)	21.2 (70.2)
Mean daily minimum °C (°F)	8.4 (47.1)	8.3 (46.9)	8.1 (46.6)	6.5 (43.7)	3.4 (38.1)	1.4 (34.5)	1.1 (34.0)	2.9 (37.2)	5.4 (41.7)	7.1 (44.8)	7.6 (45.7)	8.0 (46.4)	5.7 (42.2)
Average precipitation mm (inches)	160.0 (6.30)	146.7 (5.78)	126.7 (4.99)	50.4 (1.98)	6.3 (0.25)	3.2 (0.13)	4.0 (0.16)	6.9 (0.27)	15.1 (0.59)	47.0 (1.85)	70.1 (2.76)	120.8 (4.76)	757.2 (29.82)
Source: National Meteorology and Hydrology Service of Peru

== See also ==
- Aqumayu
- Hatun Urqu
- Maranniyuq
