= Acos District =

Coordinates: 13°57′04″S 71°44′13″W

Acos
- District
- Interactive map of Acos
- Country: Peru
- Region: Cusco
- Province: Acomayo
- Founded: January 2, 1857
- Capital: Acos

Government
  - Mayor: Juan Paulino Rios Burgos

Area
  - Total: 137.55 km^{2} (53.11 sq mi)
- Elevation: 3,085 m (10,121 ft)

Population (2005 census)
  - Total: 2,651
  - Density: 19.27/km^{2} (49.92/sq mi)
- Time zone: UTC-5 (PET)
- UBIGEO: 080203

Acos District is one of seven districts of the Acomayo Province in Peru.

== Geography ==
One of the highest peaks of the district is Maranniyuq at 4,520 m (14,830 ft). Other mountains are listed below:

- Hatun Urqu
- Inti Qhawarina
- Kunkayuq
- Markan Urqu
- Nina Urqu
- Wayna Pata

== Ethnic groups ==
The people in the district are mainly indigenous citizens of Quechua descent. Quechua is the language which the majority of the population (88.55%) learnt to speak in childhood, 11.11% of the residents started speaking using the Spanish language (2007 Peru Census).

== See also ==
- Aqumayu
