= Paruro District =

Coordinates: 13.7619°S 71.8471°W

Paruro
- District
- Interactive map of Paruro
- Country: Peru
- Region: Cusco
- Province: Paruro
- Capital: Paruro

Government
  - Mayor: Adolfo Santiago Fernandez Baca Loaiza

Area
  - Total: 153.42 km^{2} (59.24 sq mi)
- Elevation: 3,051 m (10,010 ft)

Population (2005 census)
  - Total: 3,554
  - Density: 23.17/km^{2} (60.00/sq mi)
- Time zone: UTC-5 (PET)
- UBIGEO: 081001

Paruro District is one of nine districts of the province Paruro in Peru.

== Ethnic groups ==
The people in the district are mainly indigenous citizens of Quechua descent. Quechua is the language which the majority of the population (81.62%) learnt to speak in childhood, 17.96% of the residents started speaking using the Spanish language (2007 Peru Census).

== Climate ==
Climate data for Paruro, elevation 3,070 m (10,070 ft), (1991–2020)
Month	Jan	Feb	Mar	Apr	May	Jun	Jul	Aug	Sep	Oct	Nov	Dec	Year
Mean daily maximum °C (°F)	22.5 (72.5)	22.2 (72.0)	22.5 (72.5)	23.3 (73.9)	23.1 (73.6)	22.6 (72.7)	22.4 (72.3)	23.5 (74.3)	24.2 (75.6)	24.2 (75.6)	24.8 (76.6)	23.2 (73.8)	23.2 (73.8)
Mean daily minimum °C (°F)	7.9 (46.2)	7.9 (46.2)	7.4 (45.3)	5.4 (41.7)	2.3 (36.1)	0.7 (33.3)	0.3 (32.5)	2.3 (36.1)	4.8 (40.6)	6.4 (43.5)	7.1 (44.8)	7.3 (45.1)	5.0 (41.0)
Average precipitation mm (inches)	151.9 (5.98)	146.5 (5.77)	119.4 (4.70)	40.6 (1.60)	6.9 (0.27)	2.5 (0.10)	4.2 (0.17)	5.7 (0.22)	16.9 (0.67)	55.6 (2.19)	77.9 (3.07)	141.9 (5.59)	770 (30.33)
Source: National Meteorology and Hydrology Service of Peru
