= Acomayo =

Acomayo Aqumayu
- Town
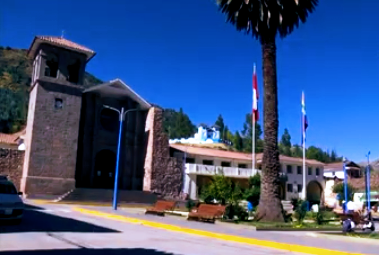
- Acomayo in 2019

- Location within Peru
- Coordinates: 13°55′0″S 71°40′52″W
- Country: Peru
- Region: Cusco
- Province: Acomayo
- District: Acomayo

Government
  - Mayor: Moises Ramos Villares
- Elevation: 3,221 m (10,568 ft)

Population (2017)
  - Total: 4,532
- Time zone: UTC-5 (PET)

Acomayo (Quechua: Aqumayu) is a Peruvian city, the capital of the district of the same name and also of the Acomayo Province, located in the Department of Cusco.

== Population ==
It had a population of 4,532 inhabitants in 2017. It is situated at 3,221 meters (10,568 ft) above sea level and about 104.5 kilometres (64.9 mi) from the city of Cusco.

== Culture ==
The town of Acomayo was declared a historical heritage of Peru on March 9, 1991, by R.J. No. 348-91-INC/J.

== Places of interest ==
- Santa Bárbara Chapel
- San Cristóbal Hacienda House
- Belén Church of Acomayo
- Waqrapukara is an archaeological site in Peru located in the district of Acos, province of Acomayo, department of Cusco. It is situated near the Apurímac River at 4,300 meters above sea level. It was built by the Qanchis and later conquered by the Incas.

== Climate ==
Average climatic parameters of Acomayo (territories between 3000 - 3500 meters above sea level).

Climate data for Acomayo, elevation 3,212 m (10,538 ft), (1991–2020)
Month	Jan	Feb	Mar	Apr	May	Jun	Jul	Aug	Sep	Oct	Nov	Dec	Year
Mean daily maximum °C (°F)	20.4 (68.7)	20.2 (68.4)	20.3 (68.5)	20.9 (69.6)	21.1 (70.0)	20.8 (69.4)	20.7 (69.3)	21.7 (71.1)	22.2 (72.0)	22.5 (72.5)	22.6 (72.7)	21.3 (70.3)	21.2 (70.2)
Mean daily minimum °C (°F)	8.4 (47.1)	8.3 (46.9)	8.1 (46.6)	6.5 (43.7)	3.4 (38.1)	1.4 (34.5)	1.1 (34.0)	2.9 (37.2)	5.4 (41.7)	7.1 (44.8)	7.6 (45.7)	8.0 (46.4)	5.7 (42.2)
Average precipitation mm (inches)	160.0 (6.30)	146.7 (5.78)	126.7 (4.99)	50.4 (1.98)	6.3 (0.25)	3.2 (0.13)	4.0 (0.16)	6.9 (0.27)	15.1 (0.59)	47.0 (1.85)	70.1 (2.76)	120.8 (4.76)	757.2 (29.82)
Source: National Meteorology and Hydrology Service of Peru
