= Paruro =

- Village
- Location within Peru
- Coordinates: 13°45′48″S 71°50′58″W
- Country: Peru
- Region: Cusco
- Province: Paruro
- District: Paruro

Government
  - Mayor: Adolfo Santiago Fernandez Baca Loaiza
- Elevation: 3,051 m (10,010 ft)

Population (2005)
  - Total: 1,750
- Time zone: UTC-5 (PET)

Paruro is a town in Southern Peru, capital of the province Paruro in the region Cusco.

== Climate ==
Climate data for Paruro, elevation 3,070 m (10,070 ft), (1991–2020)
Month	Jan	Feb	Mar	Apr	May	Jun	Jul	Aug	Sep	Oct	Nov	Dec	Year
Mean daily maximum °C (°F)	22.5 (72.5)	22.2 (72.0)	22.5 (72.5)	23.3 (73.9)	23.1 (73.6)	22.6 (72.7)	22.4 (72.3)	23.5 (74.3)	24.2 (75.6)	24.2 (75.6)	24.8 (76.6)	23.2 (73.8)	23.2 (73.8)
Mean daily minimum °C (°F)	7.9 (46.2)	7.9 (46.2)	7.4 (45.3)	5.4 (41.7)	2.3 (36.1)	0.7 (33.3)	0.3 (32.5)	2.3 (36.1)	4.8 (40.6)	6.4 (43.5)	7.1 (44.8)	7.3 (45.1)	5.0 (41.0)
Average precipitation mm (inches)	151.9 (5.98)	146.5 (5.77)	119.4 (4.70)	40.6 (1.60)	6.9 (0.27)	2.5 (0.10)	4.2 (0.17)	5.7 (0.22)	16.9 (0.67)	55.6 (2.19)	77.9 (3.07)	141.9 (5.59)	770 (30.33)
Source: National Meteorology and Hydrology Service of Peru
