= Machiguenga Communal Reserve =

Coordinates: 11.7556°S 73.5682°W

The Machiguenga Communal Reserve (Reserva Comunal Machiguenga) is a protected area in Peru located in the Cusco Region, La Convención Province, Megantoni district.

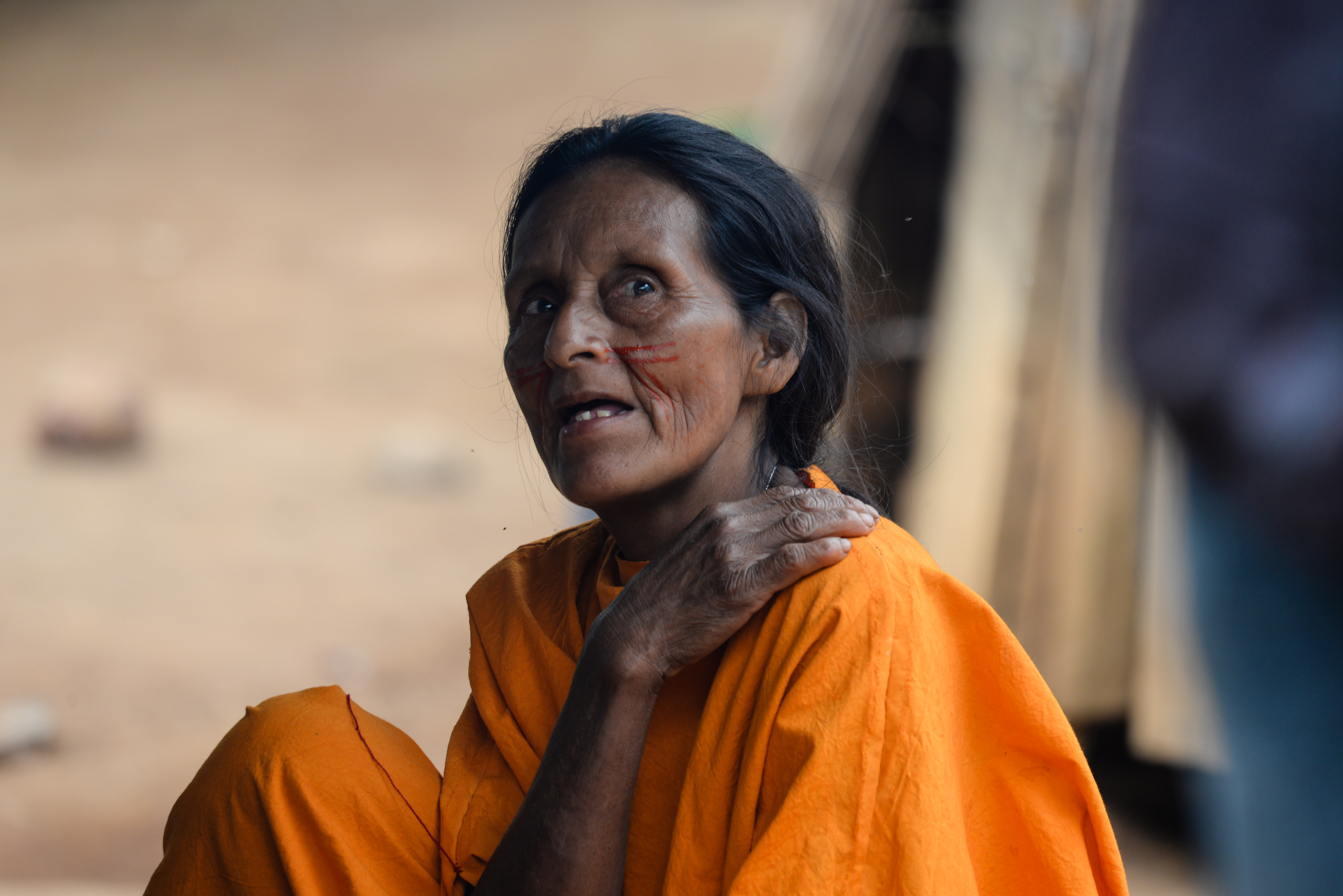
An image of Machiguenga woman in Peru

== See also ==
- Machiguenga
- Natural and Cultural Peruvian Heritage
- Megantoni National Sanctuary
