= Chapar, Upper Dir =

Chapar
- Location within Pakistan
- Coordinates: 34.59°N 72.1°E
- Country: Pakistan
- Province: Khyber Pakhtunkhwa
- Elevation: 1,088 m (3,570 ft)
- Time zone: UTC+5 (PST)

Chapar is a town of Upper Dir District in the Khyber Pakhtunkhwa province of Pakistan. It is located at 34°59'35N 72°1'0E with an altitude of 1088 metres (3572 feet).
