= Otishi National Park =

National park of Peru

- Parque Nacional Otishi
- IUCN category II (national park)
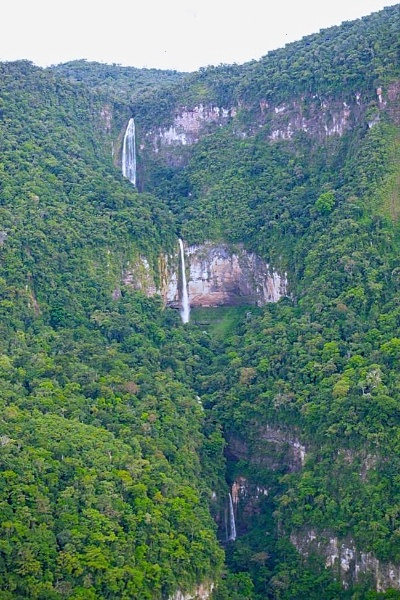
- Tres Hermanas Waterfall

- Location within Peru
- Location: Peru; Junín Region, Cusco Region
- Coordinates: 11°40′S 73°05′W
- Area: 305,973 hectares (1,181.37 sq mi)
- Established: January 14, 2003
- Governing body: SERNANP
- Website: Parque Nacional Otishi (in Spanish)

Otishi National Park (Spanish: Parque Nacional Otishi) is a protected area in Peru in the regions of Junín and Cusco. It protects part of the Vilcabamba mountain range, preserving the wildlife and geological formations in this area.

== See also ==
- Asháninka
- Machiguenga
