= Acomayo province =

Coordinates: 13°55′08″S 71°41′06″W

Acomayo
- Province
- Location of Acomayo in the Cusco Region
- Country: Peru
- Region: Cusco
- Capital: Acomayo

Government
  - Mayor: Moises Ramos Villares (2007)

Area
  - Total: 948.22 km^{2} (366.11 sq mi)

Population (2005 census)
  - Total: 27,704
  - Density: 29.217/km^{2} (75.671/sq mi)
- UBIGEO: 0802

Acomayo is one of thirteen provinces in the Cusco Region in the southern highlands of Peru.

== Geography ==
Some of the highest mountains of the province are listed below:

- Anka Tiyana
- Awaq Pata
- Ayawiri
- Hatun Ñan
- Hatun Urqu
- Inti Qhawarina
- Kunka
- Kunkayuq
- Kuntur Sayana
- Kuntur Sinqa
- Kuyu Urqu
- Llaqta K'uchu
- Maranniyuq
- Mawk'a Llaqta
- Milla Punta
- Nina Urqu
- Pariwana
- Pitu Urqu
- Pisqu Urqu
- Puka Kancha
- Pukara
- Pukarani
- Qucha Kunka
- Qullqi Marka
- Qurpa Kancha
- Q'ara Kunka
- Q'illuma Q'asa
- Q'iru Chimpa
- Runtu Marka
- Sillu Qaqa
- T'aqa Raqay
- T'aqta Urqu
- Uqlla Q'asa
- Wanu Kunka
- Waqra Pukara
- Wayllani
- Yuthu Q'asa

== Political division ==
The province is divided into seven districts (Spanish: distritos, singular: distrito), each of which is headed by a mayor (alcalde). The districts, with their capitals in parentheses, are:

- Acomayo (Acomayo)
- Acopia (Acopia)
- Acos (Acos)
- Mosoc Llacta (Mosoc Llacta)
- Pomacanchi (Pomacanchi)
- Rondocan (Rondocan)
- Sangarará (Sangarará)

== Ethnic groups ==
The people in the province are mainly indigenous citizens of Quechua descent. Quechua is the language which the majority of the population (87.48%) learnt to speak in childhood, 12.25% of the residents started speaking in Spanish.

== See also ==
- Acomayo (Cusco)
- Lake Asnacocha
- Pumaqanchi Lake
- Waqra Pukara
