= Paruro province =

Coordinates: 13°45′48″S 71°50′58″W

Paruro
- Province
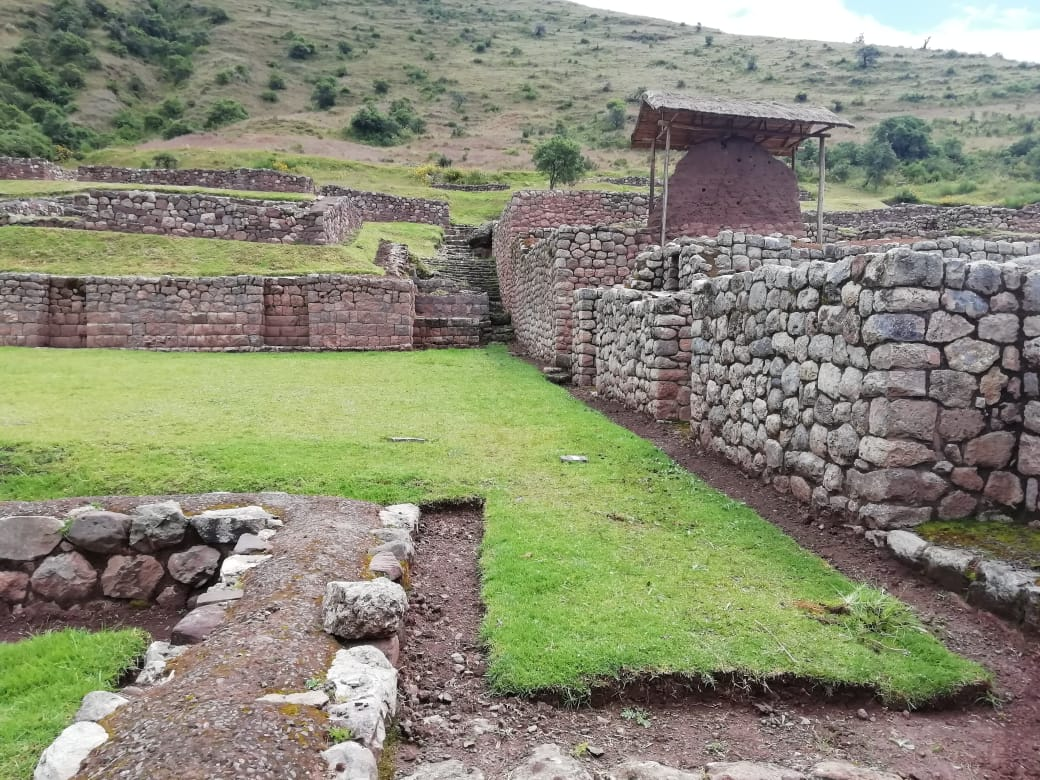
- Archaeological site of Maucallacta in the Paccaritambo District

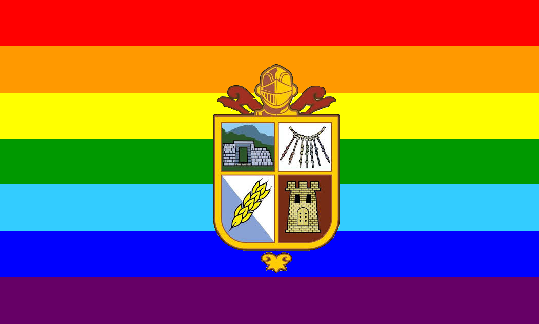
- Flag

- Location of Paruro in the Cusco Region
- Country: Peru
- Region: Cusco
- Capital: Paruro

Government
  - Mayor: Adolfo Santiago Fernandez Baca Loaiza (2007)

Area
  - Total: 1,984.42 km^{2} (766.19 sq mi)

Population (2005 census)
  - Total: 32,244
  - Density: 16.249/km^{2} (42.084/sq mi)
- UBIGEO: 0810

Paruro is one of thirteen provinces in the Cusco Region in the southern highlands of Peru.

The provincial capital of Paruro, with a population of 3,855, lies at 3,057 meters (10,032 ft) altitude. Two and a half hours by bus from Cusco, at the bottom of a deep valley, it is bordered on one side by the Rio Paruro, a feeder of the Apurímac River. A number of small Inca and pre-Inca ruins are in the area, and a series of arches was built by Simón Bolívar to celebrate a victory over the Spaniards.

Nearby Paqariq Tampu is one of the legendary origin sites of Manqu Qhapaq and Mama Uqllu, founders of the Inca Empire.

== Boundaries ==
- North: provinces of Anta and Cusco
- East: provinces of Quispicanchi, Acomayo and Chumbivilcas
- South: province of Chumbivilcas
- West: province of Chumbivilcas and Apurímac Region

== Geography ==
Some of the highest mountains in the province are listed below:

- Achiwan
- Anqas
- Awkis
- Chaku Urqu
- Chawpi
- Ch'iyar Jaqhi
- Chuqichampi
- Inti Watana
- Kancha Q'asa
- Kimsa Chata
- Kimsa Pukyu
- Kiru
- Kunturi
- Kuntur Sinqa
- Khipu
- Llama Kunka
- Lluthuq Q'asa
- Mallqu Q'asa
- Mawk'a Llaqta
- Ñaqha Pukara
- Pilluni
- Puka Q'asa
- Puma Ranra
- Puma Suyru
- Puma Urqu
- Pumawasi
- Puyka
- P'unqu Q'asa
- Qiwiña
- Qullpa
- Qullu Puphasqa
- Qupani
- Quri Pata
- Q'illu
- Runtu Urqu
- Ruq'a
- Saywa
- Sullk'an Urqu
- Suyt'u
- Taway Q'asa
- Tawqa
- Tawqa Urqu
- Umaqucha
- Ura Qaqa
- Waka Pakana
- Wallata
- Waman Pata
- Wanakawri
- Wanaku
- Wark'a Simp'ana
- Warkhuyuq
- Wathiyayuq
- Wayllayuq
- Wayruru
- Waytaqucha
- Willkani

== Political division ==
The province is divided into nine districts (Spanish: distritos, singular: distrito), each of which is headed by a mayor (alcalde). The districts, with their capitals in parentheses, are:

- Accha (Accha)
- Ccapi (Ccapi)
- Colcha (Colcha)
- Huanoquite (Huanoquite)
- Omacha (Omacha)
- Paccaritambo (Paccaritambo)
- Paruro (Paruro)
- Pillpinto (Pillpinto)
- Yaurisque (Yaurisque)

== Ethnic groups ==
The people in the province are mainly indigenous citizens of Quechua descent. Quechua is the language which the majority of the population (92.09%) learnt to speak in childhood, 7.56% of the residents started speaking in Spanish (2007 Peru Census).

== See also ==
- Mawk'allaqta
