= Department of Cusco =

Departments of Peru

Cusco Qusqu (Aymara and Quechua)
- Department
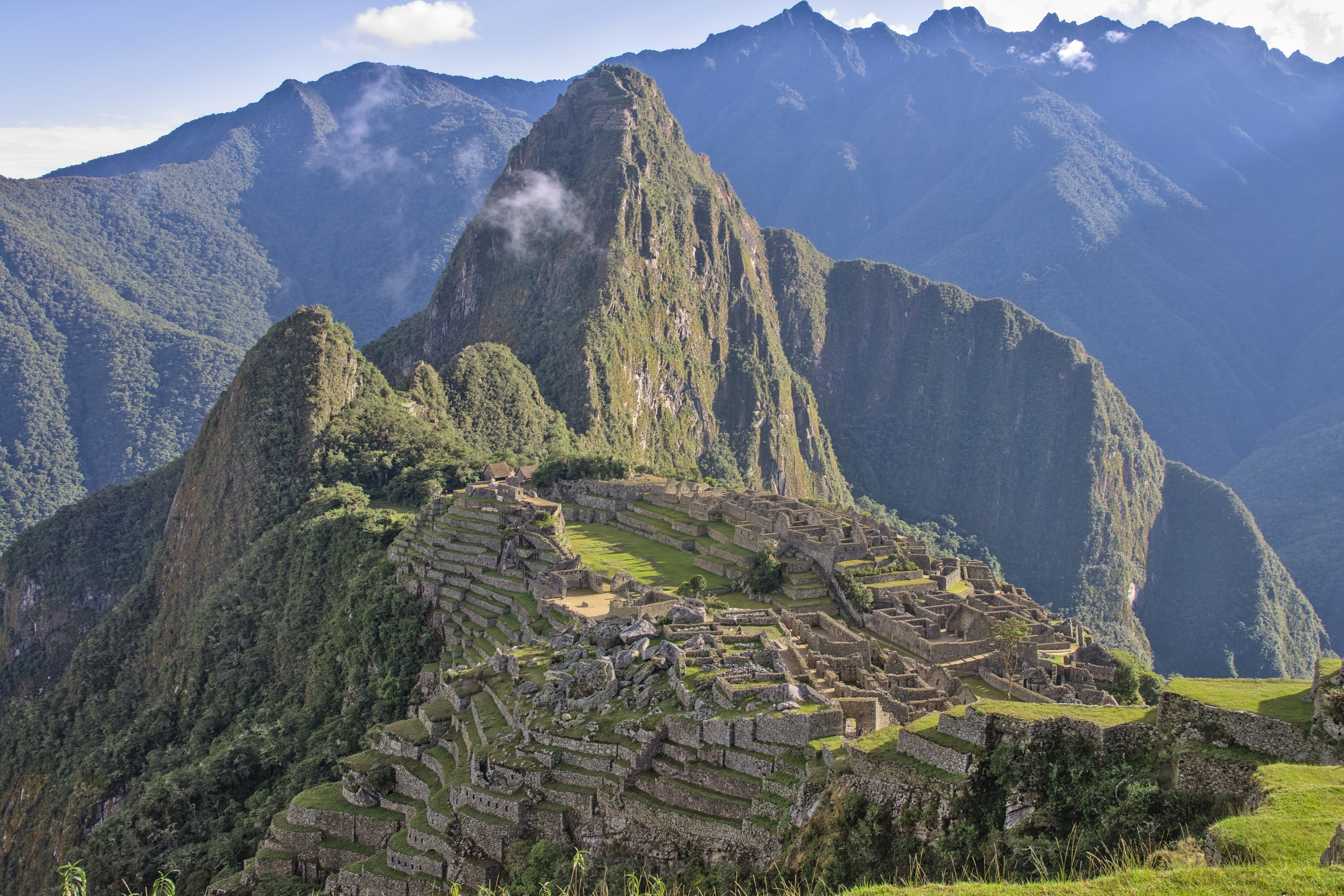
- Machu Picchu, the lost city of the Inca

- Flag Coat of arms

- Location of Cusco within Peru
- Coordinates: 13.26°S 72.11°W
- Country: Peru
- Established: April 26, 1822
- Capital: Cusco
- Provinces: List: Acomayo; Anta; Calca; Canas; Canchis; Chumbivilcas; Cusco; Espinar; La Convención; Paruro; Paucartambo; Quispicanchi; Urubamba

Government
  - Type: Regional Government
  - Governor: Werner Máximo Salcedo Álvarez

Area
  - Total: 71,986 km^{2} (27,794 sq mi)
- Elevation (Capital): 3,399 m (11,152 ft)
- Highest elevation: 4,801 m (15,751 ft)
- Lowest elevation: 532 m (1,745 ft)

Population (2025)
  - Total: 1,379,003 ▲
  - Density: 19.157/km^{2} (49.615/sq mi)
- Demonym: cusqueño/a
- UBIGEO: 08
- Dialing code: 0484
- ISO 3166 code: PE-CUS
- Principal resources: Gold, maize, barley, quinoa, and tea
- Poverty rate: 20.3% ▼
- Percentage of Peru's GDP: 4.4%
- Website: www.regioncusco.gob.pe/

Cusco, also spelled Cuzco (Spanish pronunciation: [ˈkusko]; Aymara and Quechua: Qusqu [ˈqɔsqɔ]), is a department of Peru. It is the fourth-largest in the country, after Madre de Dios, Ucayali, and Loreto, and borders the departments of Ucayali on the north; Madre de Dios and Puno on the east; Arequipa on the south; and Apurímac, Ayacucho and Junín on the west. It is administered by a regional government. Its capital is Cusco, the historical capital of the Inca Empire.

== History ==
The department was created by the Reglamento Provisional de Elecciones, published on April 26, 1822, which established the department of Cuzco alongside those of Arequipa, Huamanga, Huancavelica and Puno.

== Geography ==
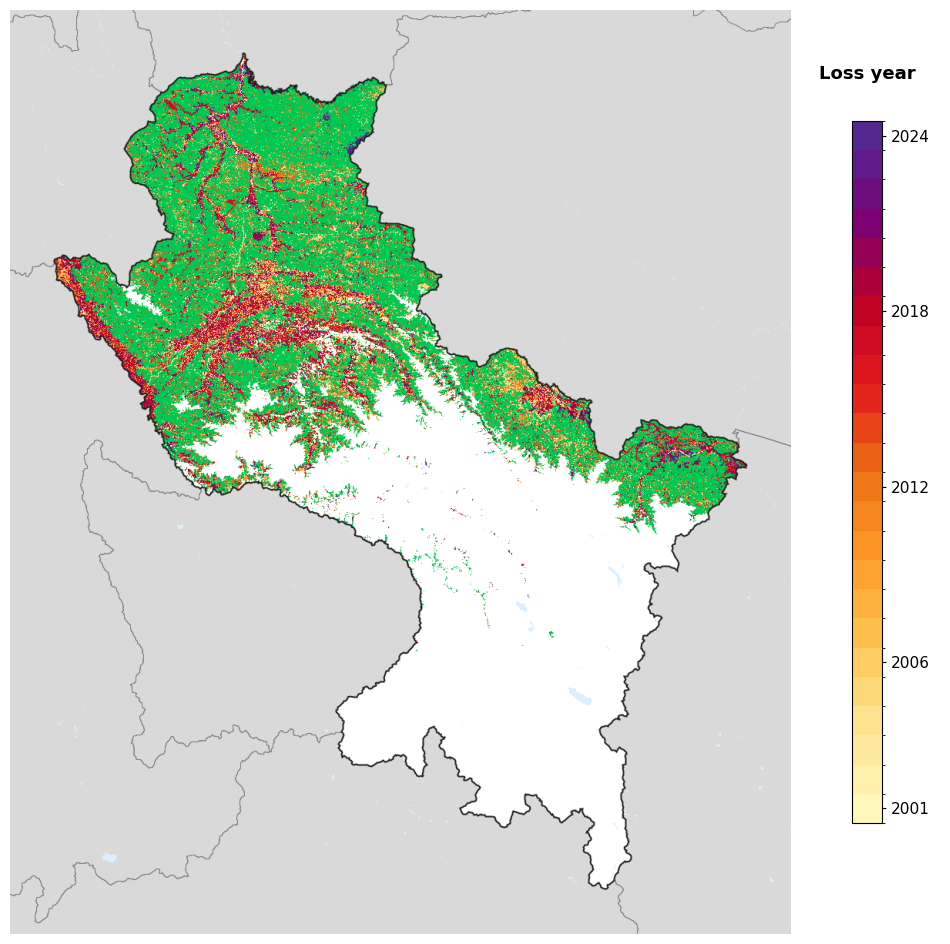
Tree-cover loss year in Cusco, 2001-2024, from the Global Forest Change dataset.

The plain of Anta contains some of the best communal cultivated lands of the Department of Cusco. It is located about 3,000 metres (9,800 ft) above sea level and is used to cultivate mainly high altitude crops such as potatoes, tarwi (edible lupin), barley and quinoa.

== Provinces ==
Map of provinces

- Acomayo (Acomayo)
- Anta (Anta)
- Calca (Calca)
- Canas (Yanaoca)
- Canchis (Sicuani)
- Chumbivilcas (Santo Tomás)
- Cusco (Cusco)
- Espinar (Yauri)
- La Convención (Quillabamba)
- Paruro (Paruro)
- Paucartambo (Paucartambo)
- Quispicanchi (Urcos)
- Urubamba (Urubamba)

== Languages ==
According to the 2007 Peru Census, the language learnt first by most of the residents was Quechua (51.40%), followed by Spanish (46.86%). The Quechua variety spoken in this department is Cusco Quechua.

The following table shows the results concerning the language learnt first in the Department of Cusco by province:

Province	Quechua	Aymara	Asháninka	Another native language	Spanish	Foreign language	Deaf or mute	Total
Acomayo	22,262	12	2	4	3,117	-	52	25,449
Anta	36,512	42	3	10	15,248	8	132	51,955
Calca	43,008	101	4	117	18,128	13	142	61,513
Canas	32,790	31	6	11	2,910	-	40	35,788
Canchis	53,695	107	5	7	37,702	2	120	91,638
Chumbivilcas	64,087	102	9	1	6,063	2	104	70,368
Cusco	63,675	781	94	306	282,610	1,521	466	349,453
Espinar	40,594	120	8	1	18,116	6	71	58,916
La Convención	62,145	276	2,802	9,278	81,111	120	318	156,050
Paruro	26,707	53	5	1	2,192	1	42	29,001
Paucartambo	35,996	95	15	207	5,682	9	65	42,069
Quispicanchi	57,587	152	11	12	18,562	20	86	76,430
Urubamba	27,523	104	4	9	25,075	823	68	53,606
Total	566,581	1,976	2,968	9,964	516,516	2,525	1,706	1,102,236
%	51.40	0.18	0.27	0.90	46.86	0.23	0.15	100.00

== Toponyms ==
Many of the toponyms of the Department of Cusco originate from Quechua and also Aymara. These names are overwhelmingly predominant throughout the region. Their Spanish-based orthography, however, is in conflict with the normalised alphabets of these languages. According to Article 20 of Decreto Supremo No 004-2016-MC (Supreme Decree) which approves the Regulations to Law 29735, published in the official newspaper El Peruano on July 22, 2016, adequate spellings of the toponyms in the normalised alphabets of the indigenous languages must progressively be proposed with the aim of standardising the naming used by the National Geographic Institute The National Geographic Institute realises the necessary changes in the official maps of Peru.

The Ministry of Culture additionally proposes to the municipalities of the provinces to recover ancient indigenous toponyms and that these names should be spread by the local and communal authorities on posters and other signage.

== Notable residents ==
- Raul Geller (born 1936), Peruvian-Israeli footballer

== Gallery ==
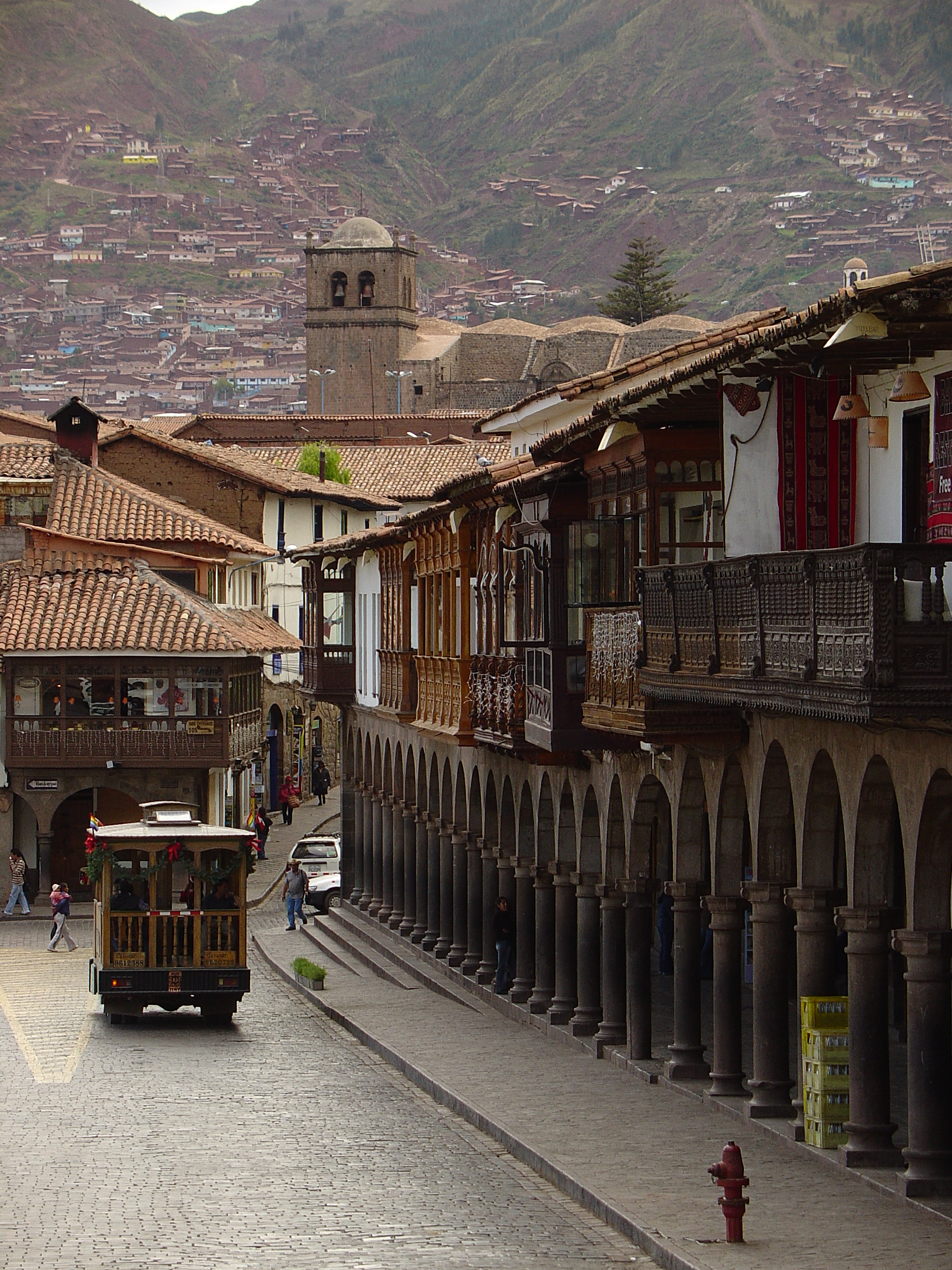
Balconies and arcades at the main square in Cusco

== See also ==
- Administrative divisions of Peru
- Machiguenga Communal Reserve
- Megantoni National Sanctuary
- Otishi National Park
