= List of shared parenting legislation =

Legislation on shared parenting is an attempt at family court reform to make shared parenting more common at the expense of sole custody, so that children of divorced parents can maintain a close daily relationship with both their mother and father. Based on scientific studies showing that children do better with shared versus sole custody, there are many organizations that advocate for shared parenting legislation, such as Americans for Parental Equality, the National Parents Organization, Americans for Equal Shared Parenting the Children's Rights Council, Families Need Fathers, the International Council on Shared Parenting, WISCONSIN for Children and Families(WFCF), and Leading Women for Shared Parenting.

The following is a list of shared parenting legislation proposals by state and year along with information from each bill relevant to shared parenting and its current status.

== Concepts within Shared Parenting Legislation ==
Family courts commonly order sole custody to one parent with visitation rights to the other. The various shared parenting legislation has some variance on a few concepts which will be pointed out here.

- Legal presumption vs consideration: A rebuttable legal presumption and preference (such as for joint custody over sole custody) give the courts a starting point. If the court determines that the legal presumption is not fit for the case, it must usually state what evidence it considers to have overcome the burden of proof associated with the legal presumption. These presumptions generally make exceptions for children suffering from abuse or neglect. A legal consideration requires the court to consider a specific type of custody, but adds no preference or presumption for it.
- Joint physical custody vs 50/50 parenting time: Different jurisdictions have differing definitions for joint physical custody. Many don't specify how much time must go to each parent to be considered joint (as opposed to sole) physical custody. Some of the legislation here aims to add a presumption for joint custody, while some of it aims to more clearly establish that parenting time should be approximately equal. Some of the legislation also aims to limit the amount of inequality in parenting time, such as setting it to at worst 35/65.
- Child support: Most child support guidelines were developed for sole rather than shared custody. This type of legislation specifies how child support should be calculated when there is equal or close to equal parenting time.

== Summary table ==
Summary Table of Shared Parenting Legislation By Country
Country	Year	Bill	Sponsor(s)	Cosponsors	Type	Lower house	Upper house	Outcome
Canada	2014	C-560	Vellacott (C)		Presumption, 50/50	Failed 80-174		Failed
Finland	2018-19	RP88	Government		Consider, 50/50	Pending		Pending
Italy	2018	S735	Pillon (LN)	3 (LN), 5 (M5S)	Presumption, 50/50		Died in committee	Failed

Summary Table of Shared Parenting Legislation By US States
State	Year	Bill	Sponsor(s)	Cosponsors	Type	Lower house	Upper house	Outcome
Alabama	2017	SB186	Stutts (R)		Presumption, joint		No vote	Failed
Alabama	2018	SB211	Stutts (R)		Presumption, Joint	Died in committee	Passed	Failed
Alabama	2019	SB266	Stutts (R)		Presumption, 50/50	Died in committee	Passed 25-4-6	Failed
Alabama	2025	HB53	Sellers (D)		Presumption, joint	Passed	Died in committee	Failed
Alaska	2018	HB368	LeDoux (R)	1 (R)	Presumption, 50/50	Died in committee		Failed
Alaska	2019	HB85	Rauscher (R)	2 (R)	Presumption, 50/50	Died in committee		Failed
Arizona	2012	SB1127	Allen(R) Burges(R) Gray(R); Barto(R) Crandell(R) Smith(R)		Consider, 50/50	Passed 46-9	Passed 28-0	Signed, Jan Brewer (R)
Arizona	2017	HB2296	Kern (R)		Presumption, 50/50	No vote		Failed
Arizona	2026	SB1720	Bolick (R)		Presumption, 50/50	Failed committee 0–8	Passed Senate 19–11	Failed
Arkansas	2019	HB1325	Lowery (R)		Presumption, joint	Died in committee		Failed
Arkansas	2021	SB18	Clark (R)	Bipartisan	Presumption, 50/50	Passed 71-16	Passed 33-2	Signed, Asa Hutchinson (R)
California	2026	AB1978	Johnson (R)		Presumption, 50/50	Referred to Judiciary		Pending
Connecticut	2017	HB6638	Gonzalez (D)		Presumption, 50/50	Died in committee		Failed
Connecticut	2017	HB6645	Srinivasan (R)		Presumption, 50/50	Died in committee		Failed
Connecticut	2025	SB01026	Martin (R)	2 (D)	Presumption, 50/50		Died in committee	Failed
Florida	2016	SB668	Stargel (R); Judiciary and Appropriations Committees		Presumption, 50/50	Passed 74-38	Passed 24-14	Veto, Rick Scott (R)
Florida	2023	HB1301	Persons-Mulicka (R)	11 (R), 2 (D)	Presumption, 50/50	Passed 105-7	Passed 34-3	Signed, Ron DeSantis (R)
Georgia	2020	HB1140	Jasmine Clark (D)	Todd Jones (R); Rhonda Burnough (D); Chuck Efstration (R); John Carson (R)	Presumption, Equal or approximately equal	Referred to Judiciary, Died		Died
Hawaii	2014	HB2163	Evans (D); Brower (D); Cabanilla (D); Choy (D); Hanohano (D); Souki (D)	4 (D), 1 (R)	Presumption, 50/50	Provision removed by amendment	Provision removed by amendment	Veto, Neil Abercrombie (D)
Hawaii	2019	HB107	McDermott (R)		Presumption, 50/50	Died in committee		Failed
Illinois	2017-18	HB4113	Ford (D)	10 (R), 5 (D)	Presumption, 50/50	No vote		Failed
Illinois	2019	HB185	Ford (D)	1 (R)	Presumption, 50/50	Died in committee		Failed
Indiana	2017	SB36	Ford (R)		Presumption, 50/50		Died in committee	Failed
Indiana	2019	HB1306	Judy (R)	1 (R), 1 (D)	Presumption, joint	Died in committee		Failed
Indiana	2019	SB87	Ford (R)		Presumption, 50/50		Died in committee	Failed
Indiana	2025	HB1067	DeVon (R)		Presumption, 50/50	Died in committee		Failed
Iowa	2017	HB71	Mommsen (R)		Presumption, joint	Died in committee		Failed
Iowa	2017	SB190	Zaun (R)		Presumption, joint		Died in committee	Failed
Iowa	2018	SB2374	Judiciary Committee		Presumption, 50/50	Died in committee	Passed 33-16	Failed
Iowa	2018	SB3154	Judiciary Committee		Presumption, 50/50		Replaced by SB2374	Replaced
Iowa	2019	SB11	Zaun (R)		Presumption, 50/50		Died in chamber	Failed
Iowa	2019-2020	SF571	Senate Judiciary Committee		Presumption, 50/50		Died in chamber	Failed
Kansas	2017-18	HB2529	Pittman (D)	9 (R)	Presumption, 50/50	Died in committee		Failed
Kansas	2017-18	SB257	Fitzgerald (D)		Presumption, 50/50		Died in committee	Failed
Kansas	2019-2020	SB157	Hilderbrand (R)	12 (R), 4 (D)	Temporary custody, presumption, 50/50	Died in committee	Passed 39-1	Failed
Kentucky	2017	HB492	Petrie (R)	2 (R)	Temporary custody Presumption, 50/50	Passed 97-0	Passed 38-0	Signed, Matt Bevin (R)
Kentucky	2018	HB528	Petrie (R)	10 (R)	Presumption, 50/50	Passed 81-2	Passed 38-0	Signed, Matt Bevin (R)
Louisiana	2026	HB1239	Green (D)	6 (D)	Presumption, 50/50	Passed 101-0	Passed 36-0	Enacted without signature
Maine	2017	HB472	Espling (R); Sampson (R)		Presumption, joint	Failed 70-77	No vote	Failed
Maryland	2017	SB905	Muse (D)		Presumption, 50/50		Died in committee	Failed
Maryland	2019	SB638	Smith (D)		Child support	Died in committee	Passed 43-0	Failed
Massachusetts	2017-18	HB3090	Markey (D), Harrington (R)	6 (R), 4 (D)	Consider, 50/50	Passed	Died in committee	Failed
Massachusetts	2025	H1710	Garry (D)		Presumption, shared	Study order		Failed
Michigan	2017-18	HB4691	Runestad (R)		Presumption, 50/50	No vote		Failed
Michigan	2025	HB5211	Johnsen (R)	18 (R), 7 (D)	Presumption, 50/50, Deviation for DV, Clear and Convincing Evidence	Referred to Judiciary		Pending
Michigan	2026	SB0940	Runestad (R)		Presumption, equal parenting time		Referred to Judiciary	Pending
Minnesota	2011-12	HB322	Scott (R)	22 (R), 6 (D)	Presumption, >45/55	Passed 86-42 (>35/65)	Passed 46-19 (>35/65)	Veto, Mark Dayton (D)
Minnesota	2017-18	HB2699	Scott (R)	5 (R), 1 (D)	Presumption, >45/55	No vote		Failed
Minnesota	2019	HB46	Hertaus (R)	3 (R), 1 (D)	Presumption, 50/50	Died in committee		Failed
Minnesota	2019	HB127	Lucero (R)	3 (R)	Presumption, >40/60	Died in committee		Failed
Minnesota	2019-2020	SF1853	Housely (R)		Presumption, 50/50		Died in committee	Failed
Mississippi	2017	SB2406	DeBar (R)		Presumption, joint		Died in committee	Failed
Mississippi	2019	SB2424	DeBar (R)		Presumption, joint		Died in committee	Failed
Mississippi	2026	HB1662	Aguirre (R)		Presumption, joint	Passed 118-0	Passed 52-0	Signed, Tate Reeves (R)
Missouri	2011	SB35	Lembke (R)		Child support		Died in committee	Failed
Missouri	2016	HB1550	Neely (R)		Consider, shared	Passed 149-2	Passed 28-0	Signed, Jay Nixon (D)
Missouri	2016	HB2055	Swan (R)		Presumption, 50/50	Died in committee		Failed
Missouri	2016	SB964	Wallingford (R)		Presumption, 50/50		Passed committee, No vote	Failed
Missouri	2017	HB724	Swan (R)		Presumption, 50/50	Passed committee, No vote		Failed
Missouri	2017	SB377	Wallingford (R)		Presumption, 50/50		Died in committee	Failed
Missouri	2018	HB1667	Swan (R)		Presumption, 50/50	Passed 137-7	Passed committee, filibustered by Schupp (D)	Failed
Missouri	2018	HB2591	Dinkins (R)		Presumption, 50/50	Died in committee		Failed
Missouri	2019	HB229	Swan (R)		Presumption, 50/50	Passed 119-30	Passed Committee, no vote	Failed
Missouri	2019	SB14	Wallingford (R)		Presumption, 50/50	Replaced by HB229	Passed committee	Failed
Missouri	2020	SB531	Wallingford (R)		Presumption, 50/50		Passed committee	Failed
Missouri	2020	HB1765	Swan (R)		Presumption, 50/50	Passed committee		Failed
Missouri	2023	SB35	May (D)	Bipartisan	Presumption, 50/50	Passed 114-9	Passed 30-4	Signed, Mike Parson (R)
Montana	2017	HB399	Zolnikov (R)		Presumption, joint	Died in committee		Failed
New Hampshire	2017-18	HB236	Pearson (R)	1 (R), 1 (D)	Presumption, 50/50	Failed 171-178		Failed
New Hampshire	2019	HB362	DeSimone (R)	4 (R)	Child support	Failed		Failed
New Hampshire	2026	HB1770	Sabourin dit Choiniere (R)	8 (R)	Presumption, 50/50	Inexpedient to Legislate		Failed
New Jersey	2018	AB1091	Peterson (R); Chaparro (D); DiMaio (R); McKnight (D)	11 (D), 3 (R)	Presumption, 50/50	Died in committee		Failed
New Jersey	2018	SB273	Cardinale (R); Bucco (R)	4 (R), 1 (D)	Presumption, 50/50		Died in committee	Failed
New Jersey	2026	A2963	Peterson (R); DiMaio (R)	4 (D), 5 (R)	Presumption, 50/50	Referred to Judiciary		Pending
New Jersey	2026	S2008	Polistina (R); McKnight (D)		Presumption, 50/50		Referred to Judiciary	Pending
New Mexico	2019	HB389	Gallegos (R); Schmedes (R)		Presumption, 50/50	Action postponed indefinitely		Failed
New Mexico	2019	SB422	Pirtle (R)		Presumption, 50/50		Action postponed indefinitely	Failed
New York	2019	SB2916	Helming (R)	2 (R)	Presumption, 50/50		Died in committee	Failed
New York	2026	A06151	Tague (R)	3 (R)	Temporary custody, presumption, 50/50	Died in committee		Failed
New York	2026	A04786	Manktelow (R)	2 (R)	Presumption, shared parenting	Referred to Judiciary		Pending
North Carolina	2015	SB711	Bryant (D)	2 (D)	Presumption, 50/50		Died in committee	Failed
North Dakota	2017	HB1392	Kading (R); Kiefert (R); McWilliams (R); Pyle (R); Jones (R); Vigesaa (R)		Presumption, 50/50	Passed 71-21	Failed 12-31	Failed
North Dakota	2019	HB1496	Kading (R); Meier (R); Rohr (R); Vetter (R); Luick (R)		Consider, 50/50	Passed 90-2	Failed 6-39	Failed
Ohio	2011	SB144	Skindell (D); Grendell (R)		Presumption, 50/50		Died in committee	Failed
Oklahoma	2019	HB1276	Lawson (R)		Presumption, 50/50	Passed 90-7	Died in committee	Failed
Oklahoma	2026	SB1708	Jech (R); Tedford (R)	15 (R)	Presumption, joint		Passed Committee	Pending
Oregon	2017	SB550	Hass (D); Thatcher (R)	1 (D)	Presumption, 50/50		Died in committee	Failed
Oregon	2019	SB318	Thatcher (R)	1 (D)	Consider, 50/50	Passed House 52–5	Passed Senate 29–0	Passed
Pennsylvania	2019-2020	HB1397	Helm et al.		Presumption, 50/50	Died in committee		Failed
Rhode Island	2026	H7821	Lima (D)		Presumption, 50/50	Committee held for further study		Pending
South Carolina	2017	HB3126	McKnight (D)	8 (R)	Presumption, 50/50	Died in committee		Failed
South Carolina	2019	HB3295	Elliott (R)	8 (R)	Presumption, 50/50	Died in committee		Failed
South Carolina	2026	H4622	Beach (R)	24 (R), 2 (D)	Presumption, 50/50	Pending		Pending
South Dakota	2017	SB72	Jensen (R), Pischke (R)	17 (R), 2 (D)	Presumption, 50/50		Failed 14-21	Failed
South Dakota	2019	HB1104	Pischke (R)	37 (R), 2 (D)	Presumption, 50/50	Passed committee		Failed
Tennessee	2019	SB448	Bell (R)	1 (R)	Presumption, joint		Withdrawn	Withdrawn
Texas	2015	HB2363	Peña (R)	1 (R)	Consider, 50/50	Passed committee, No vote		Failed
Texas	2017	HB453	White (R)	6 (R), 1 (D)	Presumption, 50/50	Died in committee		Failed
Texas	2025	SB849	Middleton (R)		Presumption, equal parenting time		Referred to State Affairs	Pending
Vermont	1990	S367	McCormack (D)				Died in committee	Failed
Vermont	1997-98	S124	McCormack (D)		Presumption		Died in committee	Failed
Vermont	2001-02	S123	McCormack (D)	3 (R), 2 (D)	Presumption		Died in committee	Failed
Vermont	2003-04	H691	Masland (D)		Presumption	Died in committee		Failed
Vermont	2005-06	H699	Masland (D)		Consider, shared	Died in committee		Failed
Vermont	2007-08	S73	McCormack (D)	1 (D)	Presumption		Died in committee	Failed
Vermont	2007-08	H141	Masland (D)	1 (R)	Consider, shared	Died in committee		Failed
Vermont	2009-10	H275	Masland (D)	1 (R), 2 (D)	Consider, shared	Died in committee		Failed
Vermont	2011-12	H354	McCullough (D)		Presumption, shared	Died in committee		Failed
Vermont	2013-14	H323	Masland (D)	5 (D), 1 (I)	Consider, 50/50	Died in committee		Failed
Vermont	2013-14	H412	McCullough (D)	10 (D), 1 (I)	Consider, 50/50	Died in committee		Failed
Vermont	2015-16	H163	Masland (D)	6 (D)	Consider, 50/50	Died in committee		Failed
Vermont	2017-18	HB166	Masland (D)	2 (D)	Consider, 50/50	Died in committee		Failed
Vermont	2017-18	HB634	McCullough (D)	1 (D)	Consider, 50/50	Died in committee		Failed
Vermont	2017-18	SB36	McCormack (D)	1 (R)	Presumption, joint		Died in committee	Failed
Vermont	2019	SB34	Benning (R)	3 (R), 1 (D)	Presumption, joint		Died in committee	Failed
Vermont	2021-22	H13	McCullough (D)		Presumption, joint	Died in committee		Failed
Vermont	2021-22	H221	Masland (D)	2 (R), 4 (D)	Presumption, joint	Died in committee		Failed
Vermont	2023-24	H400	Masland (D)	4 (D)	Presumption, joint	Died in committee		Failed
Vermont	2025-26	H369	Masland (D)	1 (D)	Presumption, joint	Referred to Committee on Judiciary (2025-02-26)		Pending
Vermont	2025-26	S304	Williams (R)		Presumption, joint		Referred to Committee on Judiciary (2026-01-23)	Pending
Virginia	2018	HB1351	Davis (R)	1 (R)	Consider, shared	Passed 98-0	Passed 40-0	Law
West Virginia	2019	HB2046	Foster (R)	7 (R), 1 (D)	Presumption, joint	Died in committee		Failed
West Virginia	2019	SB474	Azinger (R)		Presumption, joint		Died in committee	Died in committee
West Virginia	2022	SB463	Smith (R)	10 (R)	Presumption, 50/50	Passed 82-14	Passed	Signed, Jim Justice (R)
Wisconsin	2000	1999 Wisconsin Act 9 (Budget)			Presumption, joint custody is in a child's best interest	Passed	Passed	Signed, Tommy Thompson (R)
Wisconsin	2000	1999 Wisconsin Act 9 (Budget)			Maximize with both parents/Consider,50/50	Passed	Passed	Signed, T Thompson (R)
Wisconsin	2005	AB897/SB 586			Presumption, 50/50	Passed 60-35	Died in committee	Failed
Wisconsin	2007	AB571/SB311			Presumption, 50/50	Died in committee	Died in committee	Failed
Wisconsin	2013/15/17				Presumption, 50/50	Died in committee		Failed
Wyoming	2017	HB260	8 (R)	3 (R)	Presumption, 50/50	Died in committee		Failed
Wyoming	2019	HB114	10 (R)		Presumption, 50/50	Failed 18-39		Failed

== Alabama ==
Alabama Senate Bill 186 (2017) sought to create a legal presumption that joint custody is in the best interest of the child. While it did not specify what sort of time-sharing dynamics were to be considered for joint custody, it did specifically remove the language stating: "joint custody does not necessarily mean equal physical custody," This bill died in the senate chamber and did not receive a floor vote.

== Alaska ==
Alaska House Bill 368 (2018) attempted to establish that rebuttable presumption of shared physical custody was in the best interest of the child, and define it as the child residing with each parent for 50 percent of the year. The burden required to overcome the presumption was a preponderance of the evidence. This bill died in committee and did not receive a floor vote.

== Arizona ==
In 2012 Arizona Senate Bill 1127 was introduced. It changed a lot of language around child custody law that, among other things: removed the need for the court to consider the wish of the parents or children under suitable age and maturity, required the court consider if one parent intentionally mislead the court or delayed the process, encouraged the court to produce parenting plans that maximized time with each parent, and instructed the court not to consider the gender of the parents or children. Unlike other bills mentioned here, this bill created a rebuttable presumption against joint custody if domestic violence has occurred. This bill passed the Arizona Senate by unanimous vote and the Arizona House by a vote of 46 - 9. It was signed into law on 9 May 2012 by Governor Jan Brewer.

In 2017 Arizona House Bill 2296 was introduced. This bill would have entered a rebuttable presumption that joint legal decision-making and equal parenting time are in the best interests of the child. This bill died in chamber before receiving a floor vote.

== Connecticut ==
Connecticut drafted two bills in 2017 seeking to develop shared parenting. House Bill 6638 (2017) would have made a number of changes including: establishing language around parental alienation, altering some aspects of how a guardian ad litem works, establishing a presumption of joint custody with a clear and convincing burden of proof, and require that a court enter written findings when not awarding joint custody. House Bill 6645 sought to establish that shared parenting with equal access to the child is in the child's best interest, unless the court provides overwhelming evidence to the contrary. Both of these bills died in committee and did not receive a floor vote.

== Florida ==
Florida Senate Bill 668 (2016) addressed both shared parenting and alimony. It would have required that a court, upon making a parenting plan, begin with the premise that a minor child should spend approximately equal time with each parent. It also removed language stating that there was no presumption for any specific parenting plan. It also sought to set limits both on the amount and duration of alimony, setting a maximum duration of one-half the length of the marriage. This bill passed the Florida House with a vote of 74-38 and the Florida Senate with a vote of 24-14. While it was awaiting signing or veto by Governor Rick Scott, his office received more than 11,000 calls in regards to it; 80 percent of which were in support. Scott also heard directly from several organizations including the National Organization for Women, the Florida League of Women Voters, and several representatives from the Florida Bar who opposed the bill. Scott ultimately decided to veto the bill on April 15, 2016.

== Georgia ==
In the 2019-2020 legislative session, Representative Jasmine Clark (D-108) introduced House Bill 1140, which would create a rebuttable presumption that a child's best interests are served by equal or approximately equal parenting time with each parent. The bi-partisan bill was introduced and referred to the judiciary committee on March 9, 2020. The legislature was suspended on March 13, 2020 due to the COVID-19 pandemic and the bill was tabled when the legislature reconvened.

== Illinois ==
In the 2017 - 2018 session, Illinois drafted House Bill 4113. This bill would have presumed both that the child should have equal time with both parents and that both parents are fit, unless the court is presented with clear and convincing evidence otherwise. This bill has not been voted on and has not been placed on a calendar for a vote.

== Iowa ==
Iowa introduced Senate Bill 2374 in the 2017-2018 session. This bill sought to create a rebuttable presumption that if joint legal custody is awarded, joint physical custody should also be awarded. It also required that courts site clear and convincing evidence when not awarding joint physical custody. Finally, it removed language indicating that the court should consider if one parent is opposed to joint custody. This bill died in committee before a floor vote.

== Oklahoma ==
In 2019 House Bill 1276 was introduced in Oklahoma. This bill addresses temporary custody orders requiring that the court provide equally shared parenting time at the request of one parent unless it finds it is in the best interest of the child not to. This bill is still under review.

== Kansas ==
Kansas drafted both Senate Bill 257 and House Bill 2529 for the 2017-2018 session. These were identical co-bills. They would have introduced two rebuttable presumptions: that any parenting plan agreed on by both parents is in the best interest of the child, and that in the event the parents don't agree, the best interest of the child is to have equal or approximately time with each parent. Both of these presumptions required clear and convincing evidence overcome. These bills both died in committee.

For the 2019-2020 session, Kansas introduced Senate Bill 157. This bill addresses only temporary custody orders. It establishes a presumption that the court award equal parenting time in temporary orders. An amendment has been added removing the presumption if information is provided that would support a finding by the court that domestic abuse has occurred. This bill is under review.

== Kentucky ==
In 2017 Kentucky drafted House Bill 492, which addressed temporary custody orders. This bill established that if both parents agreed on a temporary order, the court would presume that is the best arrangement for the child and that if they did not agree, the court would presume the parents should share the temporary custody equally. The burden required to rebut this presumption is a preponderance of the evidence, and the court must enter facts and findings when rebutting it. This bill passed the Kentucky Senate and Kentucky House with no dissenting votes and was signed into law on 10 April 2017 by Governor Matt Bevin.

In 2018 Kentucky introduced House Bill 528. This bill is similar to House Bill 492 but addresses permanent custody orders. It created a presumption rebuttable by a preponderance of the evidence that both joint custody and equally shared parenting time is in the best interest of the child and requires the court to enter facts and findings when deviating from shared parenting. Unlike House Bill 492, this bill added, among the factors for consideration, a factored regarding if the court makes a finding that one of the parties committed domestic violence. House Bill 528 passed the Kentucky Senate by unanimous vote and the Kentucky House by an 81-2 vote. It was signed into law on 26 April 2018 by Governor Matt Bevin.

== Minnesota ==
In 2011, Minnesota legislators introduced House Bill 322. Before it was introduced, Minnesota had a presumption that parents should be granted at least 25% of the parenting time. This bill initially sought to increase that number to 45%, but was amended to increase parenting time only up to 35%. This bill passed the Minnesota House by an 86 - 42 vote, and passed the Minnesota Senate by a 46 - 19 vote. After hearing from proponents such as the Center for Parental Responsibility, and opponents including the Family Law Section of the Minnesota Bar and battered women's advocates, Governor Mark Dayton decided not to sign the bill, thus causing a pocket veto.

House Bill 2699 was introduced in Minnesota in 2017. This bill aimed to increase the presumed minimum parenting time to 40%, unless both parents agreed otherwise. This bill died in chamber.

Minnesota drafted House Bill 46 in 2019. This bill would require that, upon the request of either parent, there be a rebuttable presumption of joint legal and joint physical custody unless domestic abuse has occurred between the parties. It would also establish that joint custody means that each parent receives 50 percent of the parenting time. This bill also states that the court may determine how to calculate what 50 percent parenting time means, and suggests the method of counting overnights. This bill is still under review.

== Mississippi ==
Mississippi enacted House Bill 1662 in 2026. The bill amended Section 93-5-24 of the Mississippi Code to create a rebuttable presumption that "joint custody and equally shared parenting time is in the best interest of the child." The presumption is rebuttable by a preponderance of the evidence, and a court that does not award joint custody with equally shared parenting time must document its reasons for deviating from the presumption. The act also provides a child-support calculation for equal-parenting-time cases, allows deviation where both parents agree on a different arrangement, and states that the new presumption applies only to initial temporary and initial final custody orders entered after July 1, 2026.

The bill passed the Mississippi House on February 11, 2026, the Senate on March 5, 2026, both chambers adopted the conference report on March 31-April 1, 2026, and Governor Tate Reeves approved it on April 8, 2026. Mississippi Today reported that the measure would make 50-50 joint custody the legal standard in divorce cases, subject to rebuttal based on the child's best interests.

== Missouri ==
In 2016 Missouri introduced House Bill 1550. This bill required that the court enter written findings in any case where the parents have not agreed on a custody arrangement. It also established that a court may not presume one parent is more qualified based on their sex. It established a method with which a parent who is denied their parenting time can bring it to the court. It ensured that the system of family courts shall not adopt any local rule for standardizing or creating a default parenting plan. Finally, it required that the court create a handbook detailing guidelines on how to create a parenting plan to be distributed to each parent. This bill passed the Missouri House unanimously and the Missouri Senate by a vote of 149 - 2. It was signed into law by Governor Jay Nixon.

In 2018 Missouri introduced House Bill 1667, which would have established a presumption, rebuttable by a preponderance of the evidence, that equal or approximately equal parenting time is in the best interest of the child. This bill passed the Missouri House by a vote of 137 - 7, however it did not receive a vote in the Missouri Senate due to Senator Schupp threatening to filibuster.

In 2019 Missouri introduced House Bill 229 and Senate Bill 14, which were originally identical to each other and very similar to the previous year's House Bill 1667. They seek to established a presumption, rebuttable by a preponderance of the evidence, that equal or approximately equal parenting time is in the best interest of the child. House Bill 229 has since had an amendment to clarify that the court may accept an arrangement both parents agree on without overcoming the presumption as well as an amendment that the presumption is overcome if the court finds that a pattern of domestic violence has occurred. House Bill 229 thus became the primary bill and died without a vote from the Missouri Senate floor.

== New Hampshire ==
House Bill 236 was introduced in New Hampshire in 2017. It intended to change child support in cases where the parents have comparable parenting time. It would have established that child support goes from the higher-earning parent to the lower-earning parent. It would have also established how child support should be calculated. This bill failed a floor vote in the New Hampshire House by a vote of 171 - 178.

House Bill 362 was introduced in New Hampshire in 2019. This bill is very similar to the 2017 bill. One notable difference is that it changes the language from "comparable time" to "equal or approximately equal time." This bill is under review.

== New Jersey ==
For the 2018 - 2019 session New Jersey drafted two similar bills: Assembly Bill 1091 and Senate Bill 273. These bills seek to establish a presumption of joint legal and physical custody. they also would establish a rebuttable presumption of equal or approximately equal physical custody. Rebutting this presumption requires clear and convincing evidence that joint custody is harmful to the child. These bills are under review.

== South Carolina ==
In April 2026 the Equal Parenting Bill, making South Carolina a '50:50 Rebuttal Presumption' state, is going through the state legislature.

South Carolina introduced House Bill 3569 in 2022. This bill seeks to establish a presumption, rebuttable by clear and convincing evidence, that equally shared parenting time is in the best interest of the child with parents willing, able, and fit. This bill is under review in judiciary committee.

== South Dakota ==
In 2019 South Dakota drafted House Bill 1104. This bill makes the presumption that joint physical custody be awarded in cases where joint legal custody is awarded, it defines joint physical custody as "equal time-sharing," and sets the burden required to overcome the presumption as a preponderance of the evidence. It would also remove language from the law stating that there would not be a presumption of joint physical custody. This bill is under review.

== Texas ==
House Bill 453 was considered in Texas for the 2017 - 2018 legislative session. This bill sought to set the policy of the state to encourage separated and divorced parents to share custody equally. It also encouraged the court, when making a parenting plan, to ensure the difference in number of days provided to each parent per year not exceed five. This bill died in committee.

House Bill 803 would provide a presumption of 50/50 parenting time for fit, willing, and able parents. It was considered during the 2021 Texas legislative session. The bill had over 20 bipartisan co-authors and nearly 200 parents and activists provided testimony to the JJFI committee. Despite this, the bill was effectively killed by Chairwoman Neave.

== Vermont ==
Vermont is unusual among U.S. states because its custody statute permits court-ordered shared parental rights and responsibilities only when the parents agree to that arrangement. Under 15 V.S.A. § 665(a), a Vermont court “may order parental rights and responsibilities to be divided or shared between the parents on such terms and conditions as serve the best interests of the child.” However, the same subsection provides that “[w]hen the parents cannot agree to divide or share parental rights and responsibilities, the court shall award parental rights and responsibilities primarily or solely to one parent.”

As a result, in a contested case, the court may not impose shared parental rights and responsibilities over the objection of either parent, even if the court otherwise finds that shared responsibility would serve the child’s best interests. Vermont Legal Aid describes the rule this way: “A court can order that physical responsibility be in one or both parents. However, a court can only order this if both parents agree. If a court is asked to choose, they have to pick one parent.”

Critics of the Vermont statute argue that the agreement requirement creates an incentive for a parent to withhold consent to shared responsibility, because the absence of agreement requires the court to choose one parent as the primary or sole holder of parental rights and responsibilities. In Cabot v. Cabot, Justice Skoglund criticized the statute on this ground, writing that it “provides further incentive for divorcing parents who are primary caregivers to refuse to cooperate with their spouses on sharing parental rights and responsibilities.”

Since 1990, repeated bills have been introduced in the Vermont General Assembly to amend § 665 or otherwise authorize shared parental rights and responsibilities in contested cases. None has been enacted.

== Virginia ==
In 2018 Virginia drafted House Bill 1351. This bill indicated that the court should consider awarding joint custody but established that there should be no presumption for any form of custody. This bill passed by unanimous vote in the Virginia House and the Virginia Senate and became law on 18 May 2018.

== Wisconsin ==
In 2000 Wisconsin added two significant legislative changes via the budget bill (ACT 9). A presumption that joint custody is in a child's best interest. And instructions to maximize the amount of time allotted to both parents. The courts in WI prior to this were instructed to not consider gender in custody or placement decisions. From actual placement studies done in WI by UW IRP, shared placement doubled in the 90s (from approx 15% to 30% in divorce cases). In the first decade of the 2000s thanks partially to the ACT 9 legislative changes, shared placement in divorce cases had increased to 50% (2010). Unmarried parents fared much worse in regards to shared parenting outcomes compared to divorcing parents (only 15% shared in 2008). An initial Presumption of Equal Placement bill has been introduced several times in the second decade of the 2000s, but has failed to get significant traction. A recent (2019) study again by UW-IRP shows that Wisconsin and Maine have shared parenting outcomes for almost half of divorces, compared to an average of 25% shared placement outcomes in other states.

== Wyoming ==
Wyoming introduced [https://legiscan.com/WY/bill/HB0114/2019 House Bill 114 in 2019. This bill was not passed. There are a few groups working to change the laws to a rebuttable presumption of shared parenting. Kids Deserve Dads and its founder, Zac Martin are leading the charge to bring shared parenting to the children of Wyoming. There will be another bill in the near future either 2022 or 2023 session.
