= Ancell, Missouri =

Ancell
- Former town
- Location within the state of Missouri
- Coordinates: 37°10′06″N 89°31′14″W
- Country: United States
- State: Missouri
- County: Scott
- Township: Kelso

Ancell is a former town in the northeast corner of Kelso Township, Scott County, in the U.S. state of Missouri. It was named for Pashal Ancell, a pioneer citizen, but was first known as Glenn. It is now part of Scott City.

== History ==
Scott City is a consolidation of the formerly separate towns of Ancell, Fornfelt, and Illmo, Missouri. These towns arose in association with the building and operation of railroads that passed through the area and all incorporated around the same time. Fornfelt, then known as Edna, incorporated in 1905. Illmo, on the Missouri side of a bridge linking Illinois and Missouri, incorporated in 1906. Ancell, just to the west of Illmo, incorporated in 1907. In 1960, Ancell merged with Fornfelt and formed Scott City. Illmo merged into Scott City in 1980. A post office called Ancell was established in 1912 and remained in operation until this merger. Ancell Cemetery is 5 miles south of Scott City.

== Demographics ==
Historical population
| Census | Pop. | Note | %± |
|---|---|---|---|
| 1920 | 198 | | — |
| 1930 | 221 | | 11.6% |
| 1940 | 306 | | 38.5% |
| 1950 | 295 | | −3.6% |
Missouri Census Data Center

The US census measured the population of Ancell during its five-decade stretch of incorporation. It grew slowly then stalled before it merged to become Scott City.

== Geography ==
Ancell was located in the northern portion of Scott County at the junction between the St. Louis Southwestern Railroad and the Cape Girardeau Northern Railroad. The municipalities of Fornfelt and Illmo border it to the east and the village of Kelso lies 1.5 miles southwest.

== Education ==
In 1916 the Ancell School District began operations. Ancell had its own elementary school. In 1954 it was consolidated into the Illmo-Fornfelt-Ancell School District.

In September 1957, a new high school for that district had opened. With the opening of the new high school, the previous three elementary schools, including Ancell's, were to consolidate into the former high school building. After the municipality of Ancell consolidated into Scott City, the school district's name changed to the Illmo-Scott City School District.
