= Kelso Township =

Kelso Township may refer to the following places in the United States:

- Kelso Township, Dearborn County, Indiana
- Kelso Township, Sibley County, Minnesota
- Kelso Township, Scott County, Missouri
- Kelso Township, Traill County, North Dakota
