= Holly Thompson Rehder =

American politician (born 1969)

Holly Rehder
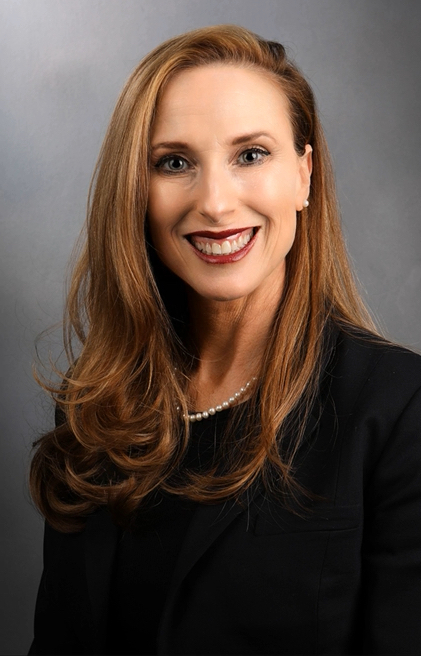

Member of the Missouri Senate from the 27th district
- In office January 6, 2021 – January 6, 2025
- Preceded by: Wayne Wallingford
- Succeeded by: Jamie Burger

Member of the Missouri House of Representatives from the 148th district
- In office January 9, 2013 – January 6, 2021
- Preceded by: David A. Day
- Succeeded by: Jamie Burger

Personal details
- Born: Holly Reneè Thompson; September 15, 1969 (age 56) Memphis, Tennessee, U.S.
- Party: Republican
- Children: 3
- Education: Southeast Missouri State University (BA)

Holly Thompson Rehder (born September 15, 1969) is an American politician. A Republican, she was a member of the Missouri House of Representatives from 2013 to 2020, elected from the 148th district (parts of Scott and Mississippi counties). She had been a member of the Missouri Senate from the 27th district since January 2021, having been elected to that body in the November 2020 election.

== Business career and education ==
Rehder received her GED, then attended the Southeast Missouri State University. She did not initially complete her degree, dropping out to work full-time instead. After 17 years, she received a Bachelor's in mass communication and a double minor in Political Science and Communications for Legal Professionals (debate).

Rehder and her former husband, Ray, founded Integrity Communications, a cable telecommunications installation and construction contractor, in 2004.

== Political career ==
Rehder spent eight years in the Missouri House of Representatives holding the seat for the 148th District. In the state House, Rehder sponsored a right-to-work law, which was opposed by organized labor. She also sponsored legislation to legalize needle-exchange programs as a way to prevent the spread of hepatitis C and HIV and to encourage intravenous drug users to seek treatment.

Since taking office in 2013, Rehder campaigned for legislation to establish a state database to track prescriptions for addictive drugs such as opioids. The proposal was endorsed by Governor Mike Parson, but faced resistance from some legislators who cited privacy concerns, and failed to advance in several legislative sessions. In supporting the proposal, Rehder cited the experience of her daughter, who had become addicted to painkillers at age 17 after receiving a prescription following a finger injury. Missouri was the only state without such a monitoring database until Rehder's bill passed in 2021.

Due to Missouri's term limits law, she was ineligible to run for another state House term in 2020, so instead she ran for the Missouri Senate, District 27 to replace state Senator Wayne Wallingford. She won the Republican primary election in August 2020 by a narrow margin of 141 votes, defeating Kathryn Swan; Rehder received 16,839 votes (50.2%) to Swan's 16,698 votes (49.8%). She was easily elected in the heavily Republican district in the 2020 general election, receiving with 63,644 votes (76.9%), defeating Democratic nominee Donnie Owens, who earned 19,135 votes (23.1%). The 27th Senate district covers a geographically large region in southeast Missouri, specifically the counties of Bollinger, Cape Girardeau, Madison, Perry, Scott, and Wayne.

Rehder praised Donald Trump and in 2019 pledged to promote "the Trump Agenda" in Southeast Missouri. She supports anti-abortion laws. In 2021, Rehder sponsored a measure to declare January 12 "Rush Limbaugh Day" in Missouri to commemorate the deceased conservative talk radio host.

Amid the COVID-19 pandemic in Missouri, Rehder was one of five Republican state senators who called on Governor Parson to call a special session to pass legislation to ban employer mandates for employees to be vaccinated against COVID-19, including mandates by both public entities and private businesses.

Rehder co-sponsored a bill adapted from Cicero Institute model legislation that criminalized sleeping on public land. It was struck down by the Supreme Court of Missouri.

In 2024 she ran for lieutenant governor coming in third in the primary behind fellow state senator Lincoln Hough and the winner David Wasinger.

== Electoral history ==
Missouri House of Representatives Primary Election, August 7, 2012, District 148
Party	Candidate	Votes	%	±%
Republican	Holly Rehder	2,330	61.28%	
Republican	Josh Bill	1,472	38.72%	

Missouri House of Representatives Election, November 6, 2012, District 148
Party	Candidate	Votes	%	±%
Republican	Holly Rehder	8,991	60.41%	
Democratic	Bart Ziegenhorn	5,893	39.59%	

Missouri House of Representatives Election, November 4, 2014, District 148
Party	Candidate	Votes	%	±%
Republican	Holly Rehder	5,915	100%	+39.59

Missouri House of Representatives Election, November 8, 2016, District 148
Party	Candidate	Votes	%	±%
Republican	Holly Rehder	13,205	100%	0

Missouri House of Representatives Election, November 6, 2018, District 148
Party	Candidate	Votes	%	±%
Republican	Holly Rehder	10,937	100%	0

Missouri Senate Primary Election, August 4, 2020, District 27
Party	Candidate	Votes	%	±%
Republican	Holly Rehder	16,839	50.21	N/A
Republican	Kathy Swan	16,698	49.79	N/A

Missouri Senate General Election, November 3, 2020, District 27
Party	Candidate	Votes	%	±%
Republican	Holly Rehder	63,644	76.88	+2.44
Democratic	Donnie Owens	19,135	23.12	−2.44

Missouri Lieutenant Governor Primary Election, August 6, 2024
Party	Candidate	Votes	%
Republican	David Wasinger	206,875	31.39
Republican	Lincoln Hough	199,423	30.26
Republican	Holly Thompson Rehder	142,801	21.67
Republican	Tim Baker	64,198	9.74
Republican	Matthew Porter	28,263	4.28
Republican	Paul Berry III	17,540	2.66
Total votes		659,100	100

== Personal life ==
Rehder was married to Raymond Rehder; they divorced after 29 years of marriage.
