= Illmo, Missouri =

Illmo
- Former town
- Location within the state of Missouri
- Coordinates: 37°13′11″N 89°30′32″W
- Country: United States
- State: Missouri
- County: Scott
- Township: Kelso

Illmo a former town in the northeast corner of Kelso Township, Scott County, in the U.S. state of Missouri. Its name is a portmanteau of "Illinois" and "Missouri".

== History ==
Illmo had its start in 1905 with construction of the nearby Thebes Bridge which connects Illinois and Missouri. The name Illmo is a contraction of Illinois and Missouri. A post office called Illmo was established in 1904, and remained in operation until 1982. Illmo was annexed by Scott City in 1980.

When Scott City and Illmo consolidated, the residents participated in a referendum where they selected the name "Scott City". The Daily Journal stated that the name was "overwhelmingly" selected.

== Demographics ==
Historical population
Census	Pop.	Note	%±
1910	976		—
1920	1,275		30.6%
1930	1,129		−11.5%
1940	1,224		8.4%
1950	1,247		1.9%
1960	1,174		−5.9%
1970	1,232		4.9%
1980	1,368		11.0%
U.S. Decennial Census

The US census measured the population of Illmo during its eight-decade stretch of incorporation.

== Geography ==
Illmo was located in the northern portion of Scott County about a mile west and three miles south of the Mississippi River. The municipalities of Fornfelt and Ancell border it to the west and the village of Commerce lies 5 miles southeast.

== Education ==
In 1905 the Illmo School District began operations. There was an Illmo High School and an Illmo Elementary School. In 1947 the Illmo school district and the Fornfelt school district combined. This district then combined with Ancell, and reorganized, in 1954, to an R-1 status, becoming the Illmo-Fornfelt-Ancell School District.

In September 1957, a new high school for that district had opened. Previously, Illmo had its own elementary school, but with the opening of the new high school, the previous three elementary schools were to consolidate into the former high school building.

The Daily Standard stated that the new Illmo-Fornfelt-Ancell high school building was the most expensive of the circa 15 new schools to open in the area in the 1957-1958 school year.

After Fornfelt and Ancell consolidated into Scott City, the district's name changed to the Illmo-Scott City School District.
