= Missouri's 27th Senate district =

American legislative district

Missouri's 27th State Senate district
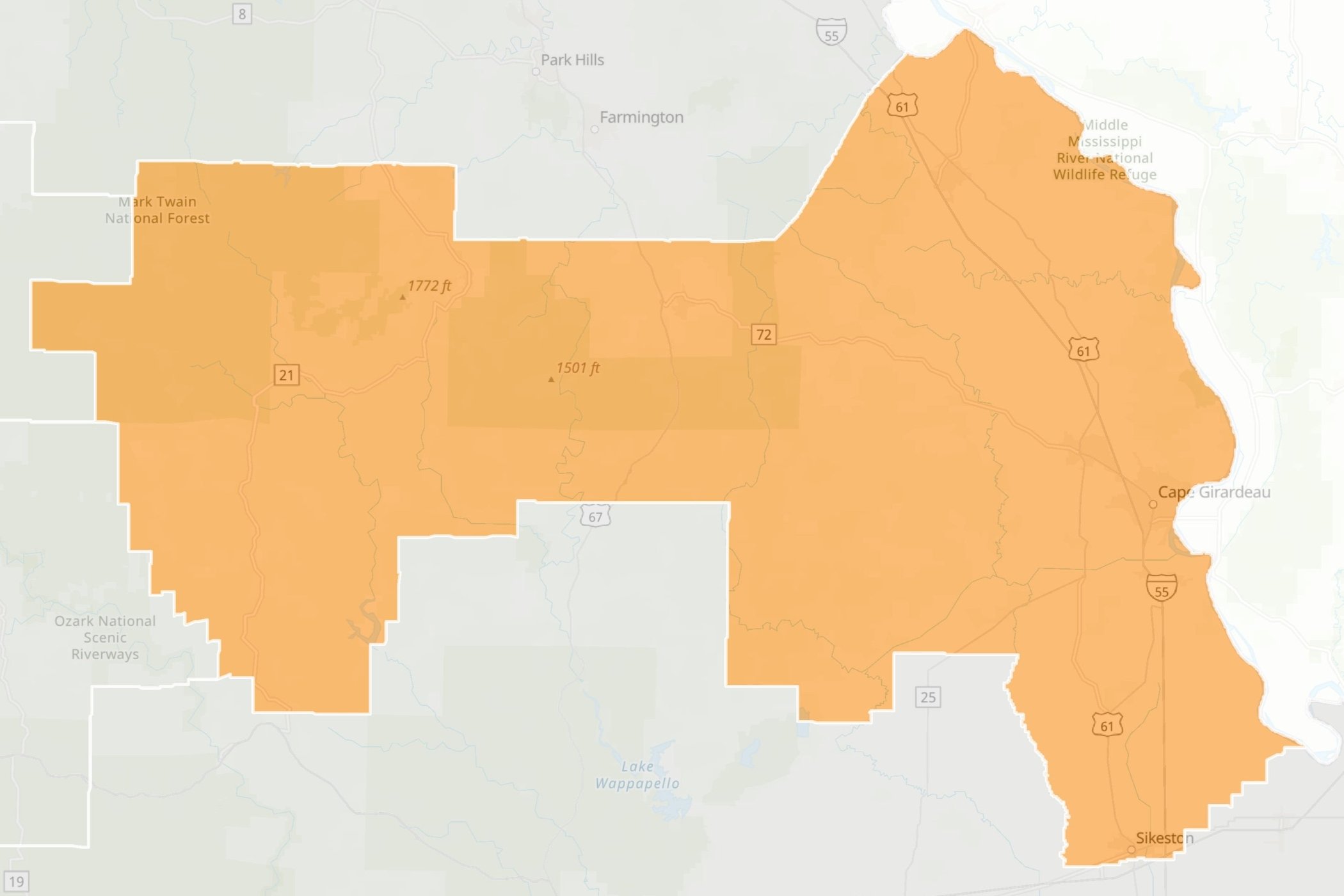
Senator
Jamie Burger; R–Benton
- Demographics: 86% White; 6% Black; 3% Hispanic; 1% Asian; 4% Multiracial
- Population (2023): 177,890

Missouri's 27th Senatorial District is one of 34 districts in the Missouri Senate. The district has been represented by Republican Jamie Burger since 2025.

== Geography ==
The district is based in Southeast Missouri and includes all of the counties of Bollinger, Cape Girardeau, Madison, Mississippi, Perry, and Scott. Major municipalities in the district include Cape Girardeau, Sikeston, Jackson, Perryville, Charleston, Scott City, and Fredericktown. The district is also home to Southeast Missouri State University.

== Election results (1996–2024) ==
=== 1996 ===
Missouri's 27th Senatorial District election (1996)
Party	Candidate	Votes	%
Republican	Peter Kinder	40,412	63.73
Democratic	Rickert Althaus	22,999	36.27
Total votes		63,411	100.00
Republican hold			

=== 2000 ===
Missouri's 27th Senatorial District election (2000)
Party	Candidate	Votes	%
Republican	Peter Kinder (incumbent)	49,442	100.00
Total votes		49,442	100.00
Republican hold			

=== 2004 ===
Missouri's 27th Senatorial District election (2004)
Party	Candidate	Votes	%
Republican	Jason Crowell	48,417	66.11
Democratic	Donnie Owens	23,446	32.02
Libertarian	Chris Morrill	1,370	1.87
Total votes		73,233	100.00
Republican hold			

=== 2008 ===
Missouri's 27th Senatorial District election (2008)
Party	Candidate	Votes	%
Republican	Jason Crowell (incumbent)	49,059	64.24
Democratic	Linda Sanders	27,308	35.76
Total votes		76,367	100.00
Republican hold			

=== 2012 ===
Missouri's 27th Senatorial District election (2012)
Party	Candidate	Votes	%
Republican	Wayne Wallingford	61,891	100.00
Total votes		61,891	100.00
Republican hold			

=== 2016 ===
Missouri's 27th Senatorial District election (2016)
Party	Candidate	Votes	%
Republican	Wayne Wallingford (incumbent)	56,750	74.44
Democratic	Donnie Owens	19,486	25.56
Total votes		76,236	100.00
Republican hold			

=== 2020 ===
Missouri's 27th Senatorial District election (2020)
Party	Candidate	Votes	%
Republican	Holly Rehder	63,644	76.88
Democratic	Donnie Owens	19,135	23.12
Total votes		82,779	100.00
Republican hold			

=== 2024 ===
Missouri's 27th Senatorial District election (2024)
Party	Candidate	Votes	%
Republican	Jamie Burger	72,629	100.00
Total votes		72,629	100.00
Republican hold			

== Statewide election results ==
Year	Office	Results
2008	President	McCain 63.3 – 34.7%
2012	President	Romney 70.6 – 29.4%
2016	President	Trump 75.8 – 20.6%
2016	Senate	Blunt 64.7 – 31.2%
2016	Governor	Greitens 65.9 – 31.1%
2018	Senate	Hawley 71.6 – 26.3%
2020	President	Trump 76.3 – 22.3%
2020	Governor	Parson 75.7 – 22.4%
