= Jason Crowell =

American politician (born 1972)

Member of the Missouri Senate from the 27th district
- In office January 5, 2005 – January 9, 2013
- Preceded by: Peter Kinder
- Succeeded by: Wayne Wallingford

Member of the Missouri House of Representatives from the 158th district
- In office January 20, 2001 – January 5, 2005
- Preceded by: Mary Kasten
- Succeeded by: Nathan Cooper

Personal details
- Born: February 3, 1972 (age 54) Cape Girardeau, Missouri
- Party: Republican
- Website: Website Campaign Website

Jason Glennon Crowell (born February 3, 1972) is a former state senator from the U.S. state of Missouri who served two terms in the Missouri Senate. He succeeded then-Lieutenant Governor Peter Kinder (R-Cape Girardeau). Crowell represents Missouri's 27th Senatorial District, which consists of Bollinger, Cape Girardeau, Madison, Mississippi, Perry, and Scott counties in Southeast Missouri. He is a member of the Republican Party.

== Early life, education, and early political career ==
Born in Cape Girardeau, Crowell is a lifelong resident of Southeast Missouri. His mother taught disabled children at the Parkview State School for over 30 years. Crowell graduated from Cape Central High School in 1990. He then attended Southeast Missouri State University in Cape Girardeau where he received his BSBA in economics in 1995. He was Student Government President at Southeast and in 1993 he worked in Washington D.C. as a legislative intern for the late Congressman Bill Emerson. From there he attended the University of Missouri School of Law in Columbia where he received his Juris Doctor in 1998. In 1996, while in law school, Crowell served as a judicial intern to Missouri Supreme Court Judge Ronnie White. In 1997, he served as a law clerk to then Attorney General Jay Nixon.

== Missouri House of Representatives ==
=== Elections ===
In November 2000, Crowell was elected to Missouri's 158th House District, based in his home city of Cape Girardeau. He defeated Democrat Tom Neumeyer 58%-42%. In 2002, he won re-election to a second term, defeating Libertarian Darby Ulery 89%-11%.

=== Tenure ===
During his first term in the statehouse, Crowell secured $250,000 in annual funding for the Network Against Sexual Violence in Cape Girardeau. The network is a child-advocacy center that provides forensic interviews and medical care to alleged victims of physical and sexual abuse. In 2003, Senator Crowell was elected to serve the chamber as majority floor leader, the leadership position responsible for setting the agenda and bill order for floor debate.

Crowell has received numerous awards, including:

- Missouri Association of Counties Legislative Award (2004)
- Missouri Farm Bureau Friend of Agriculture Award (2002 and 2004)
- Missouri Bar's Legislative Award (2002 and 2003)
- St. Louis Business Journal Award (2003)
- Missouri Supreme Court Legislative Award (2003)
- Missouri Association for Career and Technical Education Legislative Recognition Award (2002)

=== Committee assignments ===
- Ethics Committee (chair)
- Rules Committee (chair)

== Missouri Senate ==
=== Elections ===
In 2004, Crowell decided to retire from his house seat to run in Missouri's 27th Senate District (Bollinger, Cape Girardeau, Madison, Mississippi, Perry, and Scott counties). He defeated Democrat Donnie Owens 66%-32%. In 2008, he won re-election to a second term defeating Linda Sanders 64%-36%.

In 2012, Crowell decided to retire. He was unable to run for re-election due to term limits.

=== Tenure ===
In 2011, the Senate passed sweeping changes to Missouri's tax credits. Crowell's advocacy in this area led to the successful passage of this monumental legislation in the Senate, which would have saved Missouri taxpayers more than $1.5 billion over 15 years by eliminating those tax credits not providing a return on investment and making existing tax credits accountable to taxpayers. Unfortunately, House leaders blocked these important reforms from moving forward. During the 2010 special session, Crowell led the successful passage of reforms to the pension plans covering Missouri's state employees and judges. Through the establishment of a new benefit tier for state employees and judges hired on or after January 1, 2011, Crowell's legislation brought Missouri pension plans into line with economic realities.

In 2009, he passed legislation that created the Heroes Way Interstate Interchange Designation Program. This legislation allows interstate interchanges to be named for service members who were killed in action in Iraq and Afghanistan. As part of this tribute to our fallen soldiers, two memorial signs will be erected in the north–south or East–west directions of the designated interstate interchange in remembrance of their sacrifice. Another major accomplishment for Crowell was continued autism funding. Since FY2006 $1.4 million in funds has been awarded to the Tailor Institute in Cape Girardeau that specializes in working with those with high functioning autism. In addition Senator Crowell worked with Governor Jay Nixon to have reinstated $2.6 million for the construction of the Southeast Missouri Autism Center. In 2008 and each year thereafter Senator Crowell was successful in securing $494,000 for the Southeast Missouri Autism Center's annual operating budget which opened in 2009.

Crowell passed legislation in the Senate in 2007 that included the phase out of the state income tax on social security benefits and public pensions benefits for over 200,000 Missouri seniors. He was also successful in getting an additional $250,000 to go towards the Veterans' Service Officer Program that assists veterans in receiving federal benefits they have earned and a $2.8 million increase in state funding to fill to capacity our seven veterans homes in the state. Crowell also sponsored legislation that reformed the Administrative Law Judge and Legal Advisors Retirement Plan. During the 2005 session, Crowell worked to improve Missouri's economy and bring more jobs to the state by co-sponsoring workers' compensation reform and co-handling in the Senate the legislation reforming Missouri's "tort" or civil liability system. He worked to establish a Sales Tax Holiday, which provides an annual three-day sales tax exemption during the back-to-school shopping seasons.

Crowell has received the following awards:

- Distinguished Legislator Award from the Missouri Community College Association (2010)
- Appreciation Award from the Autism Society of America, Gateway Chapter (2008);
- Missouri Bar Award (2008, 2005);
- VFW Legislator of the Year Award (2007);
- American Legion Legislative Award (2007);
- Speech-Language-Hearing Association (MSHA) Award (2007);
- Missouri Academy of Audiology (MAA) Award (2007);
- Missouri Firefighters and EMS Providers Award (2007);
- St. Louis Business Journal Legislative Award (2007);
- Missouri State Teachers Association Award (2006);
- Missouri State Medical Association Legislative Award (2006)
- Missouri Association of Probate & Associate Circuit Judges Award (2006)
- Missouri Sheriff's Association Senator of the Year Award (2005)
- Missouri Chamber of Commerce Spirit of Enterprise Award (2005)
- Missouri Sheriffs Association Senator of the Year Award (2005)
- Voice of Missouri Business Award from Associated Industries of Missouri (2005)

=== Committee assignments ===
- Gubernatorial Appointments
- Pensions, Veterans' Affairs, and General Laws (chair)
- Small Business, Insurance, and Industry
- Veterans’ Affairs, Emerging Issues, Pensions, and Urban Affairs(chair)

Joint Committees

- Gaming and Wagering
- Legislative Research
- Public Employee Retirement

Select Committees

- Redistricting

Boards/commissions

- State Employees Retirement System board
- State Retirement Consolidation Commission
- Arts Council Trust Fund Board of Trustees

== 2013 congressional election ==
Crowell decided to run for the vacant Missouri's 8th congressional district after Republican incumbent Jo Ann Emerson decided to resign to become President of the National Rural Electric Cooperative Association.

== Personal life ==
Crowell resides in Cape Girardeau with his wife Casey Nicole (Hertenstein) Crowell. Crowell is a member of LaCroix United Methodist Church. He is an Eagle Scout with the Boy Scouts of America.

== Electoral history ==
2008 Election for Missouri’s 27th Senatorial District Seat
Party	Candidate	Votes	%	±%
Republican	Jason Crowell	49,059	64.24	−1.87
Democratic	Linda Sanders	27,308	35.76	+3.74

2004 Election for Missouri’s 27th Senatorial District Seat
Party	Candidate	Votes	%	±%
Republican	Jason Crowell	48,417	66.11	
Democratic	Donnie Owens	23,446	32.02	
Libertarian	Chris Morrill	1,370	1.87	

2002 Election for Missouri’s 158th District House of Representatives
Party	Candidate	Votes	%	±%
Republican	Jason Crowell	8,103	89.41	+31.44
Libertarian	C. Darby Ulery	960	10.59	

2000 Election for Missouri’s 158th District House of Representatives
Party	Candidate	Votes	%	±%
Republican	Jason Crowell	7,073	57.97	
Democratic	Tom Neumeyer	5,128	42.03	
