= Thebes Bridge =

Railroad bridge across the Mississippi River

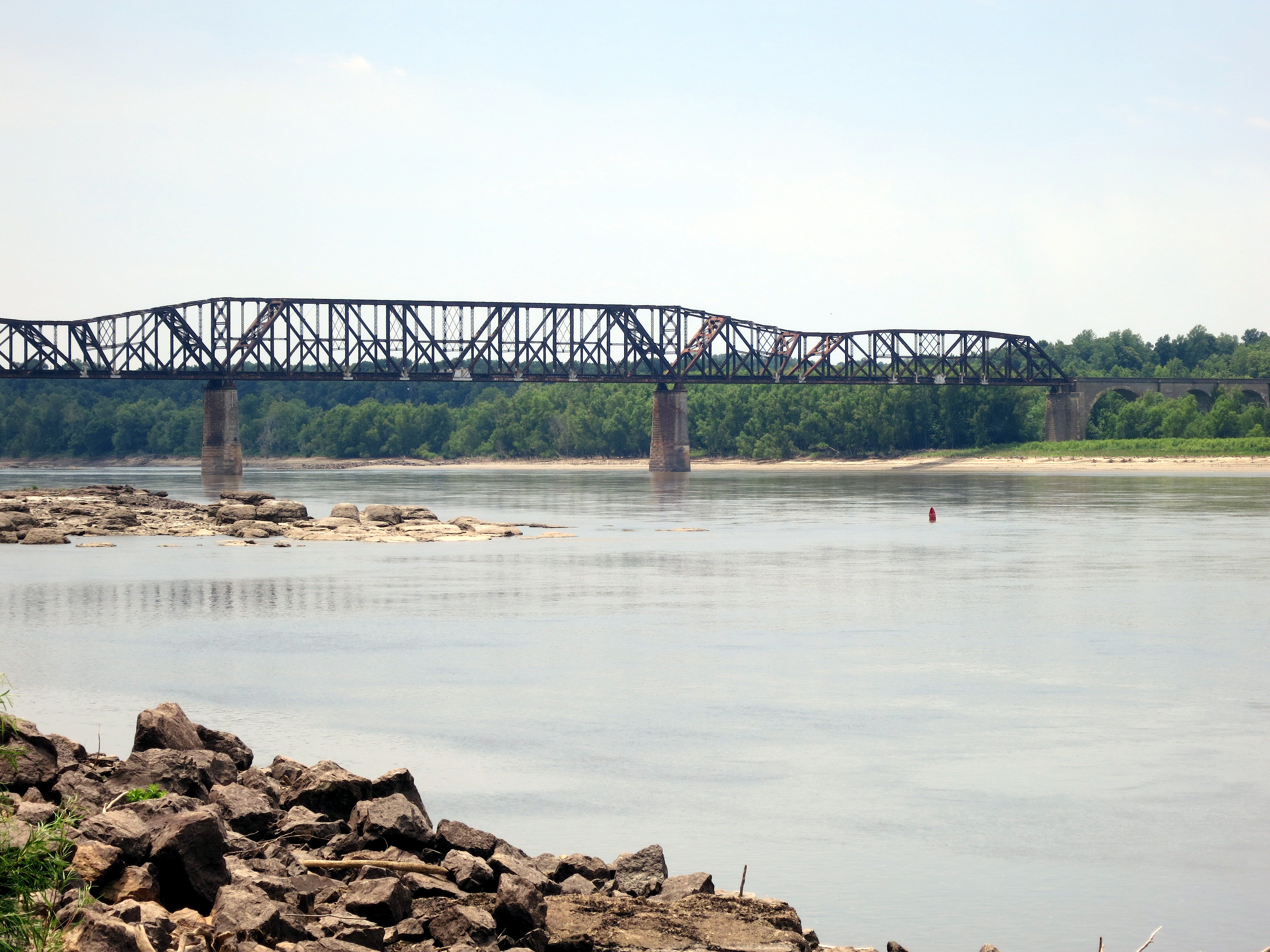
- Coordinates: 37°13′00″N 89°28′01″W
- Carries: Union Pacific, previously the Missouri Pacific Railroad
- Crosses: Mississippi River
- Locale: Illmo, Missouri and Thebes, Illinois

Characteristics
- Design: Continuous truss bridge
- Total length: 3,959 feet (1,207 m)
- Longest span: 651 feet (198 m)
- Clearance below: 104 feet (32 m)

Rail characteristics
- No. of tracks: 2

History
- Opened: April 18, 1905

Statistics
- Daily traffic: 45.8 trains per day (as of 2014)

Location
- Interactive map of Thebes Bridge

The Thebes Bridge is a five-span cantilever truss bridge carrying the Union Pacific Railroad (previously carried the Missouri Pacific and Southern Pacific, in a joint operation) across the Mississippi River between Illmo, Missouri and Thebes, Illinois. It is owned by the Southern Illinois and Missouri Bridge Company, now a Union Pacific subsidiary.

== History ==
The Southern Illinois and Missouri Bridge Company was incorporated in Illinois on December 28, 1900, to own the bridge and 4.64 miles (7.47 km) of connecting rail line. It was initially owned equally by the Chicago and Eastern Illinois Railroad, Illinois Central Railroad, Missouri Pacific Railway, St. Louis, Iron Mountain and Southern Railway, and St. Louis Southwestern Railway.

Following approval of the bridge plans in 1902, limited construction activities began that year. Following litigation over right of way that prevented certain work from proceeding from May 1902 to April 1903, construction continued with the concrete arch approach structures in 1903, and the bridge superstructure itself in 1904. The legal issues "delayed considerably" the completion of the Missouri approach work, one of the main river piers, and led to an increased expense in constructing the superstructure. The bridge was dedicated in May 1905.

The designer of the bridge was Polish-American engineer Ralph Modjeski. Contractors included C. Macdonald & Co. of New York, J.S. Paterson Construction Company of Chicago, MacArthur Brothers of Chicago, and American Bridge Company of New York. The American Bridge Company in turn subcontracted the superstructure's erection to Kelley-Atkinson Construction Co of Chicago.

The Missouri Pacific and SLIM&S merged in 1917, and in 1945 the C&EI sold its 1/5 share to the Missouri Pacific, giving the latter company, since merged into the UP, a majority interest.

== See also ==
- List of crossings of the Upper Mississippi River
