= Scott City R-I School District =

School district in Missouri, U.S.

Scott City R-I School District (SCR1), formerly the Illmo-Fornfelt-Ancell School District and the Illmo-Scott City School District, is a school district headquartered in Scott City, Missouri.

Located in Scott County, it includes most of Scott City and a part of Cape Girardeau.

== History ==
In 1947 the Illmo school district and the Fornfelt school district combined. This district then combined with the Ancell school district, and reorganized, in 1954, to an R-1 status, becoming the Illmo-Fornfelt-Ancell School District.

In September 1957, a new high school for that district had opened. Previously, Illmo had its own elementary school, but with the opening of the new high school, the previous three elementary schools were to consolidate into the former high school building.

The Daily Standard stated that the new Illmo-Fornfelt-Ancell high school building was the most expensive of the circa 15 new schools to open in the area in the 1957–1958 school year.

After Fornfelt and Ancell consolidated into Scott City on March 7, 1960, the district's name changed to the Illmo-Scott City School District.

In 1975 the City of Cape Girardeau was considering annexing Cape Girardeau Airport and adjacent areas. At the time, the Illmo-Scott City R-1 School District contained the airport and surrounding businesses. The school district administration feared that if the city government annexed the airport, then the airport area would also be transferred from the Illmo-Scott City school district to the Cape Girardeau School District, and in turn the Illmo-Scott City district would have reduced tax revenue.

Lance Amick became the superintendent in 2024.

== Schools ==
- Scott City High School
- Scott City Middle School
- Scott City Elementary School
