= Scott City, Missouri =

- City
- Location of Scott City, Missouri
- Coordinates: 37°13′28″N 89°32′10″W
- Country: United States
- State: Missouri
- Counties: Cape Girardeau, Scott

Government
  - Mayor: Norman Brant

Area
  - Total: 4.92 sq mi (12.74 km^{2})
  - Land: 4.84 sq mi (12.54 km^{2})
  - Water: 0.081 sq mi (0.21 km^{2})
- Elevation: 400 ft (120 m)

Population (2020)
  - Total: 4,346
  - Density: 897.9/sq mi (346.68/km^{2})
- Time zone: UTC-6 (Central (CST))
  - Summer (DST): UTC-5 (CDT)
- ZIP code: 63780
- Area code: 573
- FIPS code: 29-66368
- GNIS feature ID: 2396557
- Website: www.scottcitymo.org

Scott City is a city in Cape Girardeau and Scott counties in the U.S. state of Missouri. The population was 4,346 at the 2020 census. The Scott County portion of Scott City (the majority) is part of the Sikeston Micropolitan Statistical Area, while the Cape Girardeau County portion is part of the Cape Girardeau-Jackson metropolitan area.

== History ==
The town of Fornfelt and the area of Ancell were consolidated with Scott City March 7, 1960 while Illmo, Missouri, was incorporated into Scott City in 1980. The town of Fornfelt was previously known as Edna, but this name was changed as it was too similar to Edina, Missouri. Whipporwhill Hollow was the previous name of Illmo. The present name is derived from Scott County.

When Scott City and Illmo consolidated, the residents participated in a referendum where they selected the name "Scott City". The Daily Journal stated that the name was "overwhelmingly" selected.

In December 1848, a cholera epidemic was brought to New Orleans by emigrant ships. Within a few weeks, it was carried to all the principal cities on the Ohio and Mississippi Rivers. Six of the victims were Irish monks headed to a monastery near Dubuque, Iowa. These monks were buried a few hundred yards northwest of the Thebes-Scott City railroad bridge.

== Geography ==
According to the United States Census Bureau, the city has a total area of 4.77 square miles (12.35 km^{2}), of which 4.69 square miles (12.15 km^{2}) is land and 0.08 square miles (0.21 km^{2}) is water.

== Demographics ==
Historical population
Census	Pop.	Note	%±
1910	1,209		—
1920	2,017		66.8%
1930	1,721		−14.7%
1940	1,810		5.2%
1950	1,834		1.3%
1960	1,963		7.0%
1970	2,464		25.5%
1980	3,262		32.4%
1990	4,292		31.6%
2000	4,591		7.0%
2010	4,565		−0.6%
2020	4,346		−4.8%
U.S. Decennial Census 2020

=== 2020 census ===
As of the 2020 census, Scott City had a population of 4,346. The median age was 38.6 years. 23.6% of residents were under the age of 18 and 17.3% were 65 years of age or older. For every 100 females, there were 94.1 males, and for every 100 females age 18 and over, there were 89.0 males age 18 and over.

99.6% of residents lived in urban areas, while 0.4% lived in rural areas.

There were 1,766 households, of which 30.0% had children under the age of 18 living in them. Of all households, 43.1% were married-couple households, 16.9% were households with a male householder and no spouse or partner present, and 30.2% were households with a female householder and no spouse or partner present. About 29.2% of all households were made up of individuals, and 12.8% had someone living alone who was 65 years of age or older.

There were 1,972 housing units, of which 10.4% were vacant. The homeowner vacancy rate was 2.8% and the rental vacancy rate was 11.2%.

Racial composition as of the 2020 census
Race	Number	Percent
White	4,036	92.9%
Black or African American	38	0.9%
American Indian and Alaska Native	13	0.3%
Asian	9	0.2%
Native Hawaiian and Other Pacific Islander	0	0.0%
Some other race	34	0.8%
Two or more races	216	5.0%
Hispanic or Latino (of any race)	99	2.3%

=== 2010 census ===
At the 2010 census there were 4,565 people, 1,794 households, and 1,245 families living in the city. The population density was 973.3 inhabitants per square mile (375.8/km^{2}). There were 2,002 housing units at an average density of 426.9 per square mile (164.8/km^{2}). The racial makeup of the city was 96.93% White, 0.68% Black or African American, 0.26% Native American, 0.24% Asian, 0.83% from other races, and 1.05% from two or more races. Hispanic or Latino of any race were 1.45%.

Of the 1,794 households 36.2% had children under the age of 18 living with them, 50.2% were married couples living together, 14.4% had a female householder with no husband present, 4.8% had a male householder with no wife present, and 30.6% were non-families. 26.1% of households were one person and 11% were one person aged 65 or older. The average household size was 2.54 and the average family size was 3.02.

The median age was 36.3 years. 25.6% of residents were under the age of 18; 9.1% were between the ages of 18 and 24; 27.3% were from 25 to 44; 24.8% were from 45 to 64; and 13.2% were 65 or older. The gender makeup of the city was 48.3% male and 51.7% female.

=== 2000 census ===
At the 2000 census there were 4,591 people, 1,801 households, and 1,287 families living in the city. The population density was 999.1 inhabitants per square mile (385.8/km^{2}). There were 1,953 housing units at an average density of 425.0 per square mile (164.1/km^{2}). The racial makeup of the city was 98.26% White, 0.39% African American, 0.37% Native American, 0.04% Asian, 0.13% from other races, and 0.81% from two or more races. Hispanic or Latino of any race were 0.63%.

Of the 1,801 households 35.1% had children under the age of 18 living with them, 53.8% were married couples living together, 13.3% had a female householder with no husband present, and 28.5% were non-families. 24.8% of households were one person and 10.5% were one person aged 65 or older. The average household size was 2.54 and the average family size was 3.02.

The age distribution was 26.6% under the age of 18, 9.0% from 18 to 24, 29.1% from 25 to 44, 22.9% from 45 to 64, and 12.4% 65 or older. The median age was 35 years. For every 100 females, there were 92.7 males. For every 100 females age 18 and over, there were 87.6 males.

The median household income was $31,958 and the median family income was $36,763. Males had a median income of $30,088 versus $17,061 for females. The per capita income for the city was $15,099. About 8.6% of families and 12.8% of the population were below the poverty line, including 22.6% of those under age 18 and 13.5% of those age 65 or over.

== Government ==
=== Presidential ===
Scott City vote by party in presidential elections
Year	Democratic	Republican	Third Parties
2020	18.30% 370	79.87% 1,615	1.83% 37
2016	19.21% 406	76.95% 1,626	3.83% 81

== Education ==
Scott City R-I School District includes the majority of Scott City in Scott County. operates Scott City Elementary School, Scott City Middle School, and Scott City High School. A portion of Scott City in Scott County is in the Kelso C-7 School District. The portion of Scott City in Cape Girardeau County is in the Cape Girardeau 63 School District, which operates Central High School.

The Illmo-Fornfelt-Ancell School District became the Illmo-Scott City School District after Scott City was created.

Scott City has a public library, a branch of the Riverside Regional Library.

Three Rivers College's service area includes Scott County, which covers most of Scott City. Cape Giradeau County is in the service area of Mineral Area College.
