= Tina Harley =

American politician

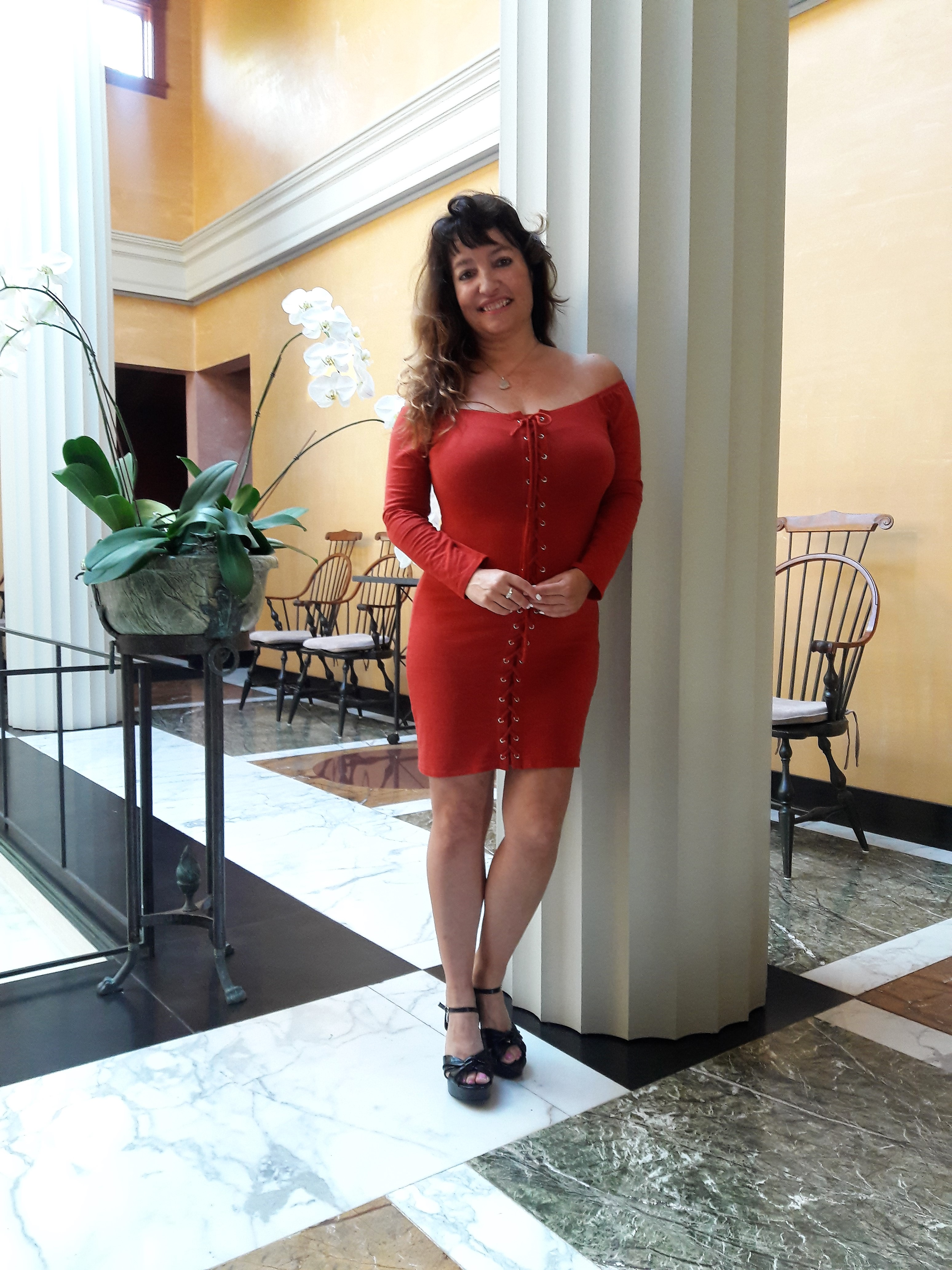
- Harley in 2018

Member of the New Hampshire House of Representatives from the Rockingham 30th district
- In office December 7, 2022 – May 1, 2024
- Succeeded by: Matt Sabourin dit Choinière (elect)

Member of the New Hampshire House of Representatives from the Rockingham 20th district
- In office 2020 – December 7, 2022

Personal details
- Party: Republican

Tina Harley is an American politician. She served as a Republican member for the Rockingham 30th district of the New Hampshire House of Representatives. During Harley's two terms, she served on the State-Federal Relations and Veterans Affairs Committee.

Harley resigned from the New Hampshire House on May 1, 2024 due to a change in residency.
