= Gail Mooney =

American politician

Member of the North Dakota House of Representatives from the 20th district
- In office December 1, 2012 – December 1, 2016
- Preceded by: Lee Kaldor
- Succeeded by: Aaron McWilliams

Personal details
- Born: December 14, 1960 (age 65) Minot, North Dakota
- Party: Democratic

Gail Mooney (born December 14, 1960) is an American politician who served in the North Dakota House of Representatives from the 20th district from 2012 to 2016.
