= Jared Hagert =

American politician

Member of the North Dakota House of Representatives from the 20th district
- In office December 1, 2018 – February 9, 2026
- Preceded by: Aaron McWilliams
- Succeeded by: Dave Rustebakke

Personal details
- Party: Republican
- Education: North Dakota State University (BS)

Jared C. Hagert is an American politician who served as a member of the North Dakota House of Representatives from the 20th district. Elected in November 2018, he assumed office on December 1, 2020.

== Education ==
Hagert earned a Bachelor of Science degree in agricultural systems management from North Dakota State University in 1998.

== Career ==
Hagert owned and operated Hagert Farms and is the president of Integrated Ag Services, LLC. He was also the president of the United Soybean Board. Hagert was elected to the North Dakota House of Representatives in November 2018 and assumed office on December 1, 2018. He resigned in February 2026, after being appointed to the Farm Service Agency.
