= Gabrielle LeDoux =

American politician (born 1948)

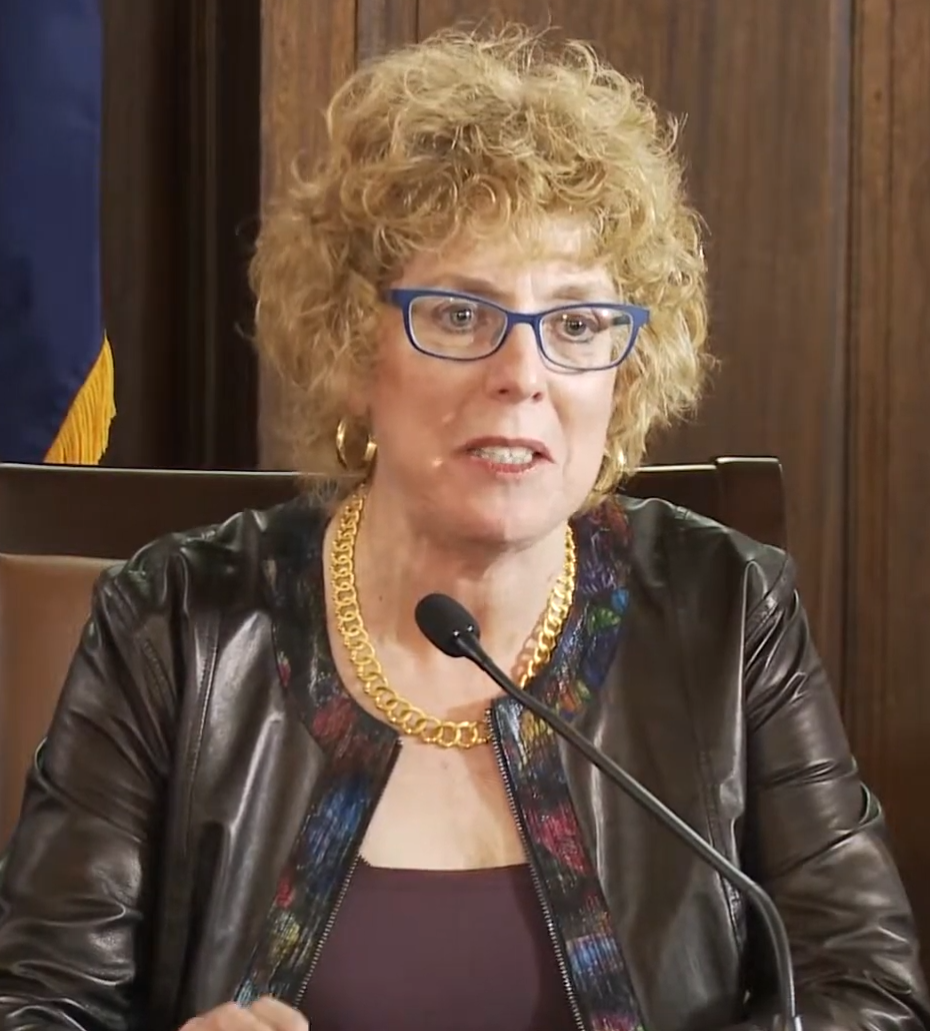
- Gabrielle LeDoux, January 2017

Member of the Alaska House of Representatives from the 15th district
- In office January 10, 2005 – January 19, 2021
- Preceded by: Andy Josephson
- Succeeded by: David Nelson

Personal details
- Born: March 24, 1948 (age 78) Baltimore, Maryland, U.S.
- Party: Republican Party

Gabrielle LeDoux (born March 24, 1948) is an American politician, a member of the Republican Party, and former member of the Alaska House of Representatives. She lives in Anchorage. LeDoux is a former maritime attorney, having practiced law in Kodiak and Anchorage.

In March 2020, it was announced that she was charged with voter misconduct and unlawful interference with voting after an investigation by the FBI and the Alaska State Troopers.

== Education and family ==
LeDoux went to La Mirada High School in La Mirada, California. She is a graduate of the University of California, Berkeley (B.A. degree, 1970) and the UC California, Berkeley School of Law (J.D. degree 1973). She also attended the University of Southern California in Los Angeles (1966–1968). She moved to Alaska in 1978, first living in Anchorage before moving to Kodiak in 1980. LeDoux's husband (Kurt) and youngest son (Daniel) died in a car accident in 1992. She has two other children, Matthew and Sheree, and two grandchildren, Cuauhtemoc and Bjorn.

== Political career ==
LeDoux ran for State House as a Democrat in Kodiak in 2000, losing in the general election to Gary Stevens by a margin of 44 percent to 55 percent. She served as mayor of the Kodiak Island Borough from March 2001 to October 2004. LeDoux was elected to the Alaska House of Representatives in 2004. Taking office in January 2005, she served two terms in the Alaska State Legislature until January 2009 and was a recipient of the Toll Fellowship in 2006.

While in the legislature LeDoux served as co-chair of both the Fisheries and the Community and Regional Affairs Committees. She was a member of the Labor and Commerce, and Resources committees. In October 2007, LeDoux announced her candidacy for the United States House of Representatives in Alaska's at-large congressional district in 2008, challenging 18-term congressman Don Young and Lieutenant Governor Sean Parnell. LeDoux was dubbed a spoiler and placed a distant third in the primary, receiving a little more than 9 percent of the vote. She carried her former legislative district by a plurality but it was the only part of the state that she won. Ledoux said in July 2009 that she would not run again in 2010 if Young sought re-election.

After her second term in the House ended in January 2009, LeDoux moved to east Anchorage from Kodiak Island in 2009. She ran for State House in her new district in the 2010 election and lost to Pete Petersen in the general election by 5 percent (47 percent to 52 percent). In 2012, LeDoux's presumptive Democratic opponent withdrew after winning an uncontested primary, and was replaced by Kay Rollison. LeDoux beat Rollison in the general election. LeDoux defeated retired Colonel Laurie Hummel to represent District 15 (East Anchorage) in 2014 (52 percent to 47 percent). LeDoux is her own single largest campaign contributor, by a factor of more than 10.

After being elected in 2016 to her 5th non-consecutive term in the state house, LeDoux joined a majority coalition of Democrats, Independents, and two other Republicans with an avowed goal of ameliorating the state's budget deficit, the latter a product of declining oil revenues, budgeting, and prior taxation restructuring. She was chosen to chair the house Rules Committee. Alaska's state Republican Party chair, Tuckerman Babcock, informed LeDoux by letter that the party would recruit and support a primary opponent against her in 2018. After joining the majority coalition in 2016, LeDoux expressed confidence that she would be representing the needs of her constituents saying "We're hired to do a job, and the purpose of our job is not to keep our job. It's to actually do something.". In 2018, she won the Republican primary with 57% of the votes against Aaron Weaver and then the general election with 42% of the votes against Democrat Lyn Franks (35%) and Jake Sloan, a write-in candidate (24%).

=== Voter fraud accusations ===
In March 2020, the Alaska Department of Law accused LeDoux of Election Misconduct after a two-year investigation which included the FBI.

== Political views and accomplishments ==
=== Families and children ===
LeDoux is known for sponsoring and being part of the passage of the 2008 "Safe Haven" Bill which allows parents to surrender newborns without prosecution. In 2018, she wrote and sponsored family court legislation establishing a rebuttable presumption favoring equal time shared parenting as being in the best interest of the child after a divorce, unless there is child abuse or neglect.

=== Public safety ===
For the 2019 legislative session, LeDoux was one of several sponsors of a bill seeking to enact that there be mandatory jail time for being convicted of car theft. She said, "by changing the law to strengthen penalties we will send a clear message that this kind of lawless behavior will not be tolerated."

== Community service ==
- Alaska Bar Association, member
- Alaska Municipal League, former board member
- Alaska Chamber of Commerce, member
- Kodiak Launch Complex advisory board
- Maritime Law Association, former member
