= Jamie Burger =

American politician

Member of the Missouri Senate from the 27th district
- Incumbent
- Assumed office January 6, 2025
- Preceded by: Holly Rehder

Member of the Missouri House of Representatives from the 148th district
- In office January 6, 2021 – January 6, 2025
- Preceded by: Holly Rehder
- Succeeded by: David Dolan

Personal details
- Born: Sikeston, Missouri
- Party: Republican

Jamie Burger is an American politician currently serving in the Missouri House of Representatives from Missouri's 148th district. He won the seat unanimously after no other candidate ran against him. He was sworn in on January 6, 2021.

In 2025, Burger sponsored legislation that would require school classrooms to display a copy of the Ten Commandments.
