= Central High School (Cape Girardeau, Missouri) =

Cape Central High School
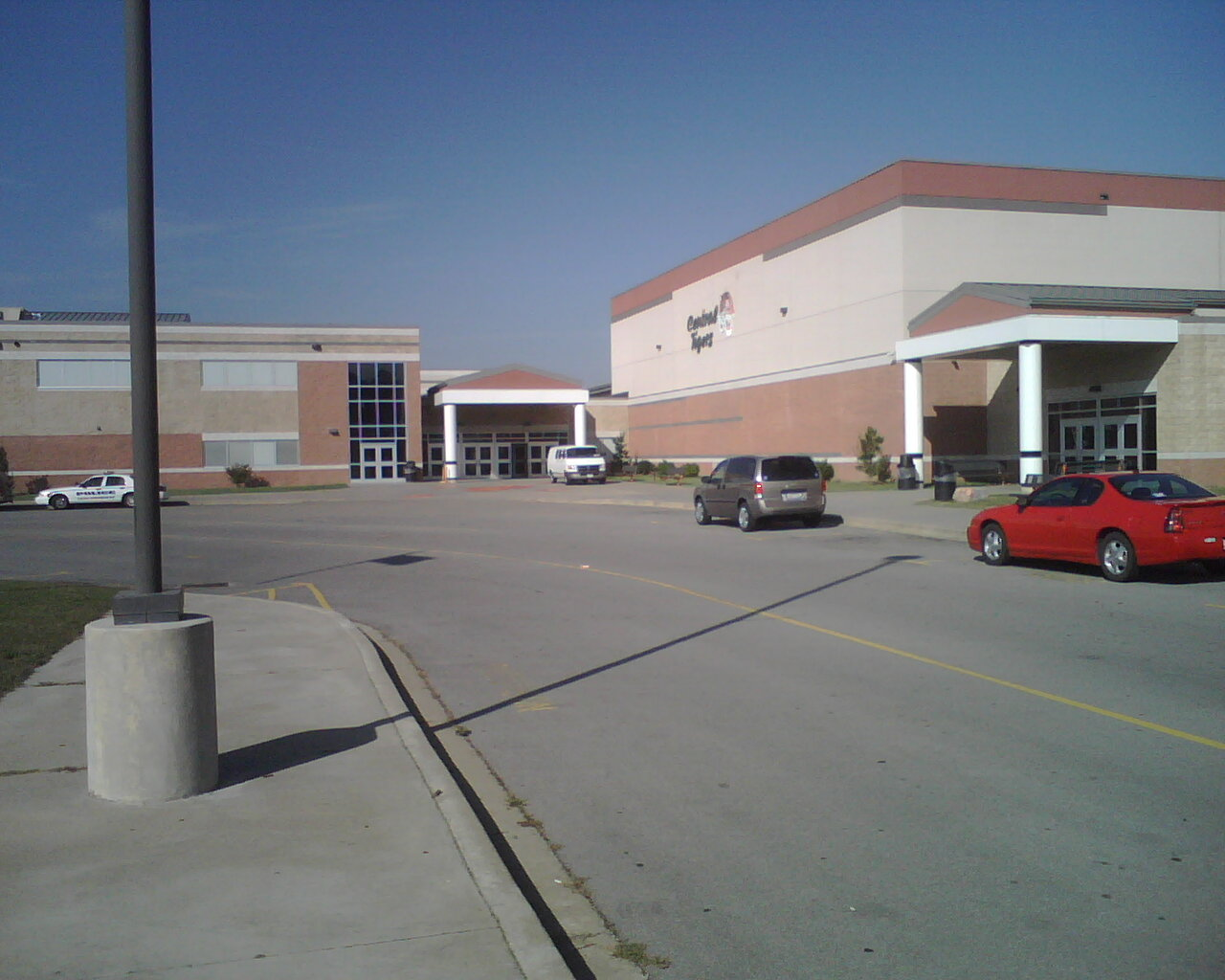

Location
- 1000 South Silver Springs Road; Cape Girardeau, Missouri 63703; United States; 37°16′36″N 89°33′54″W

Information
- Type: Public high school
- School district: Cape Girardeau School District
- Principal: Nancy Scheller
- Grades: 9–12
- Enrollment: 1,278 (2024–2025)
- Campus type: High School
- Colors: Orange and black
- Mascot: Tiger
- Website: chs.capetigers.com

Central High School is a public high school located in Cape Girardeau, Missouri, United States. It is in the Cape Girardeau School District.

The district, and therefore the high school's attendance boundary, includes the vast majority of Cape Girardeau, as well as the majority of Dutchtown and small sections of Jackson and Scott City.

== Campus ==
Central High moved from its old building (now Central Junior High School) to the newly constructed one in 2002. The campus has a variety of athletic facilities on site, including a tennis court, a full track, along with baseball, softball, soccer, and marching band practice fields. There is a 5000-seat stadium and a performing arts building, Richard D. Kinder Performance Hall. The main building is divided into two wings, one of which houses the academic classrooms on two levels; and the other is an athletic/music wing with two gymnasiums, a weight room, wrestling room, and a band/orchestra practice room. A full library is centrally located, indoor courtyard-style, in the academic wing of the building.

== Academic honors ==
Cape Central High School was recognized in May 2007 by ACT as one of 382 schools in America (one of eight in Missouri) for academic rigor in mathematics and science. Cape Central has also been commended for its Advisory class, which helps many students.

== History ==
On May 18, 2024, two students were shot and wounded at a ceremony for the school's graduation held at the Show-Me Center in Cape Girardeau.

== Notable alumni ==
- Kathryn Swan, member of the Missouri House of Representatives
- Rush Limbaugh, Conservative Radio Talk Show Host, commentator, TV personality, and actor
