= Nathan Cooper (Missouri politician) =

American politician and attorney

Member of the Missouri House of Representatives from the 158th district
- In office 2005–2007
- Preceded by: Jason Crowell

Personal details
- Born: September 28, 1973 (age 52) Potosi, Missouri
- Party: Republican

Nathan Cooper (born September 28, 1973) is a former attorney and politician in Missouri. He resigned from the Missouri House of Representatives in 2007 after pleading guilty to immigration fraud.

== Early life and education ==
Cooper was born in Potosi, Missouri. He attended Valley R-VI High School in Caledonia, majored in Criminal Justice at Southeast Missouri State University, and attended Saint Louis University School of Law.

== Career ==
Cooper previously had law offices in Cape Girardeau and St. Louis. Prior to running for office, he was a political operative for Jo Ann Emerson, David Klarich, and temporarily for Gene McNary.

In 2004, Cooper was elected to serve in the Missouri House of Representatives, representing Cape Girardeau County. He was seen as a "rising star" in the Missouri Republican party.

In 2005, Cooper sponsored a bill to remove the power to extend voting times from judges following a 45 minute extension granted for St. Louis polls. He also voted to increase restrictions on abortion in Missouri.

In 2007, Cooper plead guilty to two felony charges for illegal processing and purchasing H-2B visas for clients in the trucking industry. As a result, he resigned from the House of Representatives, the Missouri Supreme Court suspended his license to practice law, and he was sentenced to 15 months in prison. Prior to pleading guilty, Cooper had campaign treasurer Victor Gunn transfer all funds to another campaign committee. Gunn said he was unaware of Cooper's legal trouble at the time and would have prevented the transfer, which made it impossible to refund donors.

In 2017 and 2018, Riverfront Times ran stories on Cooper's rental properties in St. Louis, which were criticized for negligence. He started buying properties in 2007 at the start of the foreclosure crisis and earned a reputation as a 'voucher specialist' exploiting tenants relying on Section 8 vouchers. Journalists also found that Cooper managed several properties owned by other parties, including his former employee and later state treasurer Vivek Malek, who said he had been unaware of unaddressed maintenance issues. By 2024, Cooper closed many of his LLCs and sold properties off.
