= Matt Sabourin dit Choinière =

American politician and Holocaust denier

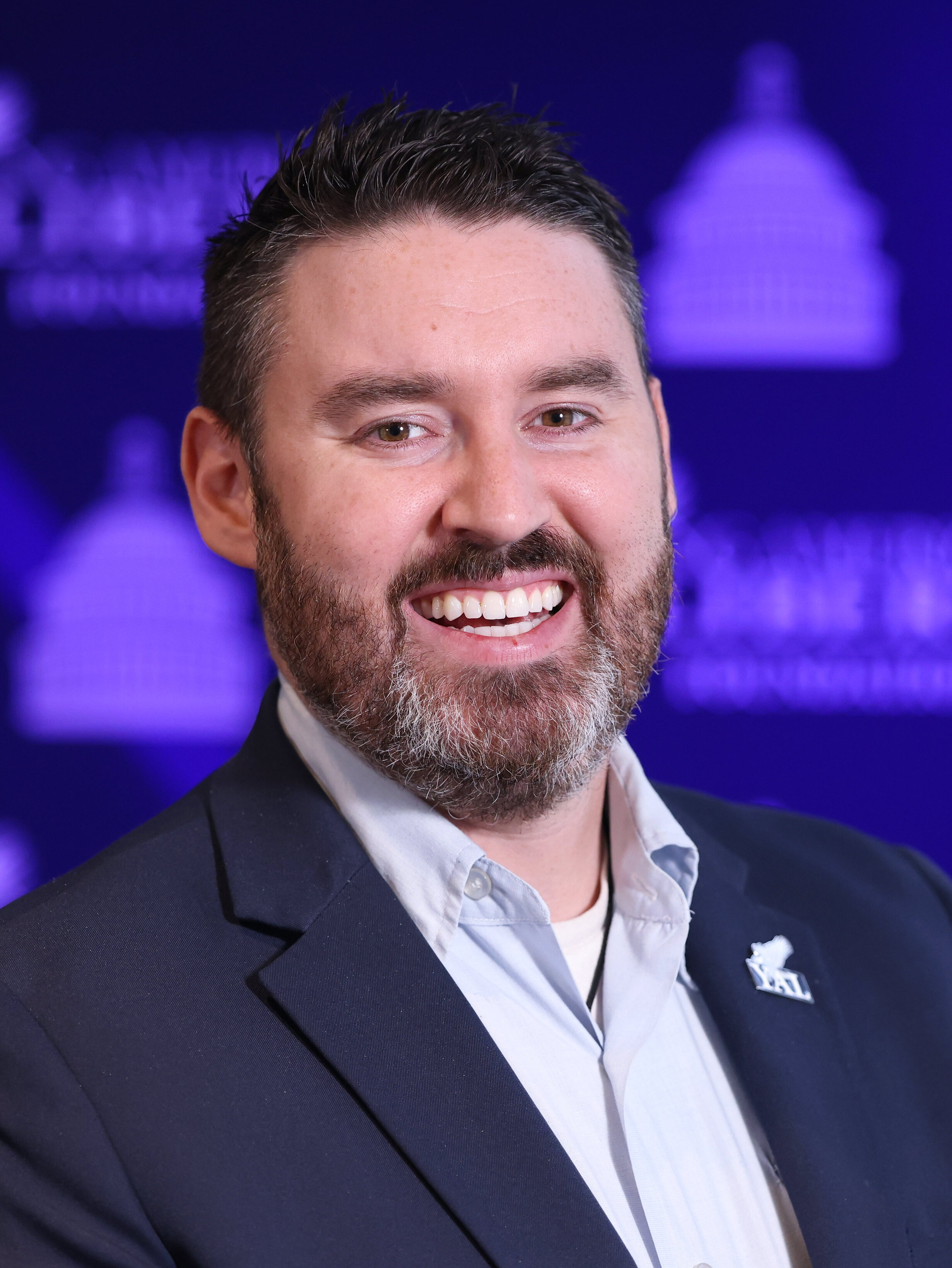
- Sabourin dit Choinière in 2024

Member of the New Hampshire House of Representatives from the Rockingham 30th district
- Incumbent
- Assumed office December 4, 2024
- Preceded by: Tina Harley

Personal details
- Party: Republican

Matt Sabourin dit Choinière is an American politician. He serves as a Republican member of the New Hampshire House of Representatives from Rockingham 30th district. He was elected in November 2024 and assumed office on December 4, 2024. He was defeated in the 2026 primary after a legislative incident in which he attempted to place Holocaust denier Germar Rudolf on the state's Holocaust education board.

According to New Hampshire Public Radio, Sabourin dit Choinière is closely associated with New Hampshire's libertarian Free State Project movement, an educational nonprofit aimed at encouraging supporters of libertarianism to move to New Hampshire.

== Holocaust denial ==
On January 14, 2026, Sabourin dit Choinière attended a New Hampshire House Executive Department and Administration public meeting on HB 1162, a bill to extend the Commission on Holocaust and Genocide Studies. During the meeting, he introduced an amendment proposing representative for the Committee for Open Debate on the Holocaust (CODOH) on the commission. CODOH has been described by the Anti-Defamation League as an antisemitic group that promotes Holocaust denial and is associated with the Institute for Historical Review. While speaking, Sabourin dit Choinière visually presented books endorsed by the CODOH, including books by Italian Holocaust denier Carlo Mattogno, which he was then asked to remove. The proposed amendment was not adopted and did not appear in the final version of the legislation. He also invited Germar Rudolf, a longtime Holocaust denial activist, to testify at the January hearing; Rudolf has been convicted in Germany for Holocaust denial and in the United States for open lewdness, indecent exposure at a children's playground in Pennsylvania, and trespassing on school grounds.

== Primary, 2026 ==
In the New Hampshire Republican primary, held September 8, 2026, Sabourin dit Choinière placed third place, receiving 23% of the vote. The other two candidates, Aboul Khan and Jason Janvrin, advanced to the general election ballot.
