= Aaron McWilliams =

American politician (born 1983)

Member of the North Dakota House of Representatives from the 20th district
- In office December 1, 2016 – December 1, 2020
- Preceded by: Gail Mooney
- Succeeded by: Jared Hagert

Personal details
- Born: November 2, 1983 (age 42) Alexandria, Louisiana, U.S.
- Party: Republican

Aaron McWilliams (born November 2, 1983) is an American politician who served as a member of the North Dakota House of Representatives for the 20th district from 2016 to 2020.
