= Jim Masland =

American politician and member of the Vermont State House of Representatives

Member of the Vermont House of Representatives
- Incumbent
- Assumed office January 1999
- Preceded by: Ruth Dwyer
- Constituency: 4th Orange district (1999‍–‍2003); 2nd Windsor–Orange district (since 2003)

Personal details
- Born: Hanover, New Hampshire, U.S.
- Party: Democratic
- Spouse: Suzanne Sheldon
- Children: 7
- Education: Stanford University (BA, MS)

James W. Masland is an American politician who has served in the Vermont House of Representatives since 1991.

He received a master's degree from the Stanford University School of Engineering.
