= Wayne Wallingford =

American politician (born 1946)

Member of the Missouri House of Representatives from the 147th district
- In office January 6, 2021 – January 3, 2022
- Preceded by: Kathryn Swan
- Succeeded by: John Voss

Member of the Missouri Senate from the 27th district
- In office January 9, 2013 – January 6, 2021
- Preceded by: Jason Crowell
- Succeeded by: Holly Rehder

Member of the Missouri House of Representatives from the 158th district
- In office January 5, 2011 – January 9, 2013
- Preceded by: Clint Tracy
- Succeeded by: Scott Fitzpatrick

Personal details
- Born: July 11, 1946 (age 80) Geneva, Illinois, U.S.
- Party: Republican
- Children: 2

Wayne Wallingford (born July 11, 1946) is an American politician who has served as Director of the Missouri Department of Revenue since January 2022. He previously served as a member of the Missouri House of Representatives from the 147th district. He previously served as a member of the Missouri Senate from 2013 to 2021.

== Career ==
In January 2022, Wallingford became the new director of the Missouri Department of Revenue. Governor Mike Parson announced Wallingford's appointment in December 2021.

Wallingford was a member of Governor Mike Parson's commission on workforce development.

In 2016 and 2017, Wallingford proposed legislation to established a rebuttable presumption of shared parenting after divorce. Wallingford has asserted that most fatherlessness is created by an outdated court system, not abandonment, and that it is in the best interest of a child to have both parents. Neither bill was voted upon. In 2019, Wallingford reintroduced a similar bill (SB.14). After passing the Seniors, Families and Children Committee, it is waiting to be voted on by the full senate.

Wallingford has sponsored legislation to ban texting while driving in Missouri.

== Electoral history ==
=== State representative ===
Missouri House of Representatives Primary Election, August 3, 2010, District 158
Party	Candidate	Votes	%	±%
Republican	Wayne Wallingford	2,584	50.64%	
Republican	Debra Tracy	2,519	49.36%	

Missouri House of Representatives Election, November 2, 2010, District 158
Party	Candidate	Votes	%	±%
Republican	Wayne Wallingford	8,742	79.66%	3.37
Libertarian	Robert Lee Roland	2,232	20.34%	−3.37

=== State Senate ===
Missouri Senate Primary Election, August 7, 2012, District 27
Party	Candidate	Votes	%	±%
Republican	Wayne Wallingford	16,408	64.14%	
Republican	Ellen Brandom	9,175	35.86%	

Missouri Senate Election, November 6, 2012, District 27
Party	Candidate	Votes	%	±%
Republican	Wayne Wallingford	61,891	100.00%	+35.76

Missouri Senate Election, November 8, 2016, District 27
Party	Candidate	Votes	%	±%
Republican	Wayne Wallingford	56,750	74.44%	−25.56
Democratic	Donnie Owens	19,486	25.56%	+25.56
