= Kathryn Swan =

American politician

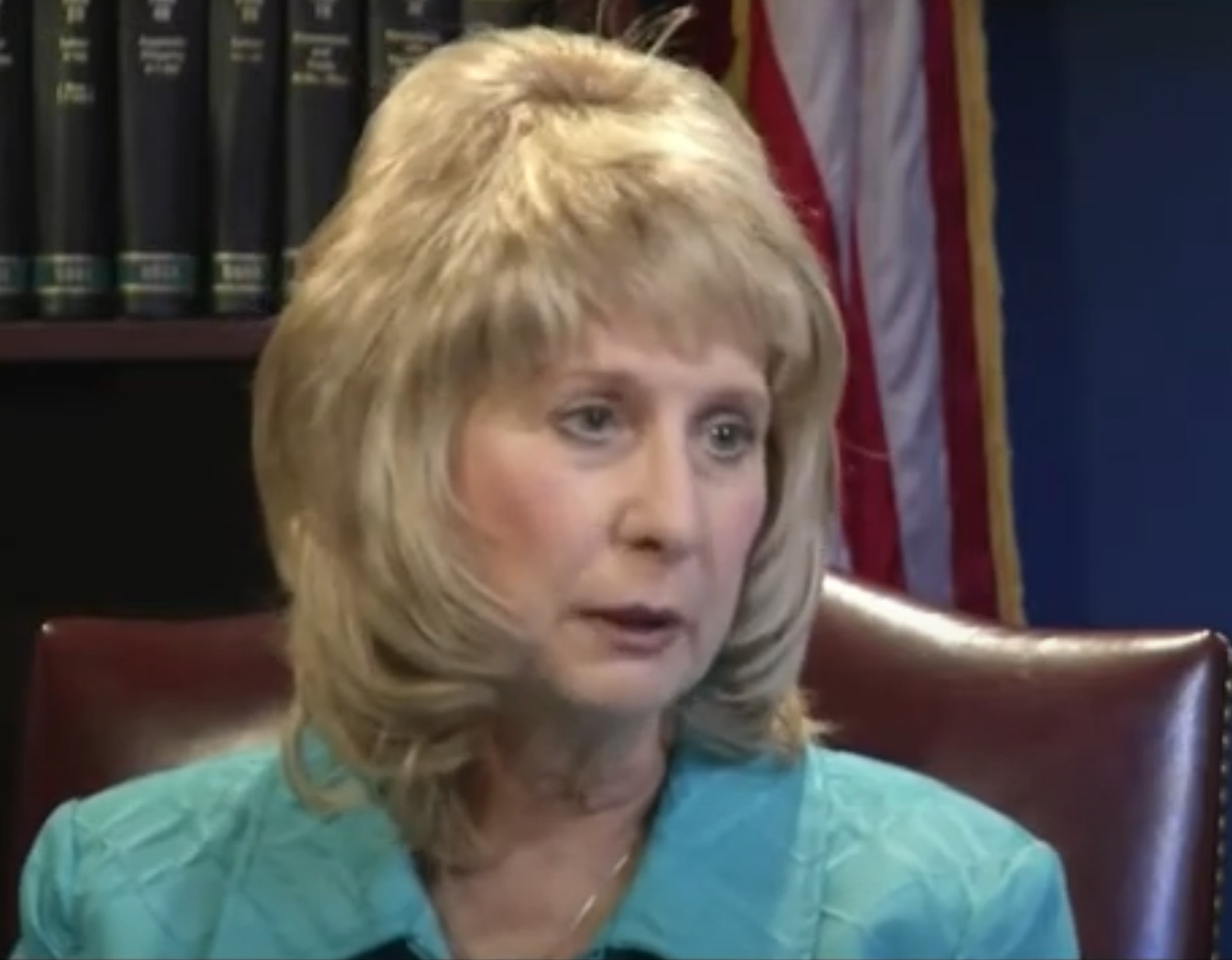
- Swan in 2013

Member of the Missouri House of Representatives from the 147th district
- In office 2013–2021
- Succeeded by: Wayne Wallingford

Personal details
- Born: November 9, 1950 (age 75)
- Party: Republican
- Spouse: Reg Swan
- Children: Regan, Maria
- Profession: businesswoman, nurse

Kathryn Swan (born November 9, 1950) is an American politician. She has been a Republican member of the Missouri House of Representatives since 2013. Because of term limits she is not eligible to run for reelection in 2020, and she said she will run for an open senate seat being vacated by senator Wayne Wallingford.

== Education and personal life ==
Swan graduated from Central High School in Cape Girardeau, after which she earned a B.S in nursing from Southeast Missouri State University. As a nurse she has worked in a variety of areas including progressive care, employee health, infection control, administrative supervision, and as a clinical instructor. Swan is the president of JCS Wireless, a small wireless communications company with offices in Cape Girardeau, Perryville, Missouri and Chester, Illinois.

Swan is married to Reg Swan and she has two children, Regan and Maria.

== Political positions ==
=== Education ===
In 2018, Swan proposed house bill HB1665 to allow high schools to temporarily hire professionals without an education degree but with a bachelor's degree in their subject area. Under this new visiting scholars program, a teacher can be hired for one year, with an option to renew for two more years. With only three no votes in the house and one no vote in the senate, the new law was signed by governor Eric Greitens on June 1, 2018.

=== Families and children ===
In 2018, Swan proposed house bill HB1667 to established a rebuttable legal presumption of shared parenting after divorce or separation. With this bill, except in situations of child neglect or abuse children would spend equal or near equal parenting times with their mother and father. The bill passed the house with a vote of 137 to 7; it passed the senate committee, but was filibustered in the Senate. Swan reintroduced the bill in 2019, under the new name of HB229.
