= Daily Journal (Missouri) =

Daily newspaper in Park Hills, Missouri

- Type: Daily newspaper
- Format: Broadsheet (March 23, 2009)
- Owner: Paxton Media Group
- Founder(s): S.W. Brumfield, Noah A. Grieg
- Editor: Lisa Brotherton
- Founded: January 10, 1930, as The Leadwood Press
- Headquarters: Kentucky
- Country: United States
- Circulation: 1325 Daily (as of 2022)
- OCLC number: 20310466
- Website: dailyjournalonline.com

The Daily Journal is a daily newspaper in Park Hills, Missouri, United States. It covers local news in the counties of St. Francois, Ste. Genevieve, Reynolds, Jefferson, Madison, Iron and Washington.

== History ==
The Leadwood Press was founded on January 10, 1930, by Rev. S.M. Brumfield.

In 1935, the paper was moved to Flat River. In 1940, it was published three times a week under the name the St Francois County Journal. On September 3, 1946, the St Francois County Daily Journal was published for the first time. Noah A. Grieg was a big part of the paper becoming a daily publication.

Madison County's newspaper, the Democrat News, also ran in the area as well. Later on, the Democrat News was bought by Lee Enterprises and started running with the Daily Journal in the Fredericktown area.

In June 2023, Lee Enterprises sold the Daily Journal and three other newspapers to Better Newspapers Inc. In September 2025, the paper was acquired by Paxton Media Group.
