= Kelso Township, Scott County, Missouri =

Township in Scott County, Missouri, U.S.

Coordinates: 37.1917°N 89.5631°W

Kelso Township is an inactive township in Scott County, in the U.S. state of Missouri.

Kelso Township was erected in 1822, taking its name from I. R. Kelso, a pioneer citizen.
