= Russia and Black Lives Matter =

Aspect of Russian interference in American internal affairs

The relationship between Russian intelligence services and the Black Lives Matter movement is a concern that emerged among scholars in the late 2010s who have researched Russian interference in United States elections. Russian operatives associated with the Internet Research Agency (IRA) have engaged in an online campaign to both encourage support of and opposition to the Black Lives Matter movement.

== Background ==
Soviet media has criticized racial inequality and violence in the United States since at least 1930s, often using this argument to deflect criticism aimed at the human rights abuses in the USSR, or to create a sense of false moral equivalency between the two states. Lynchings of African Americans were brought up as an embarrassing skeleton in the closet for the U.S., which the Soviets used as a form of rhetorical ammunition when reproached for their own economic and social failings. This became known as the "And you are lynching Negroes" argument, later described as whataboutism, and continued during the Cold War and beyond.

In the late 2010s, researchers found that increases in Russian disinformation activity on Twitter were correlated with increases in polarising conversations regarding the Black Lives Matter movement. One such activity included Russian accounts mimicking Black Lives Matter activists, or supported issues central to the Black Lives Matter cause. Activities on Facebook include purchasing ads to promote Black Lives Matter. Reporting by investigative journalists uncovered Russian links with Facebook pages promoting Black Lives Matter. In one instance, Russian activities on social media led to real-life protests on behalf of Black Lives Matter.

Prior to this development, in 2010, a report commissioned for the United States Senate Intelligence Committee, the Russian firm Internet Research Agency was identified as creating social media accounts as part of a complex campaign to suppress the black American vote. However, subsequently, investigative journalists found that the Russian firm sought to promote the issue of Black Lives Matter in order to instigate mistrust in US law enforcement and political institutions. While Russian operatives have engaged in an online campaign to encourage supporters of the Black Lives Matter movement, their efforts also have included promoting opposition against the group, including inciting violence against the group's supporters.

=== 2016 US elections ===
According to scholars, Russian interference in the 2016 United States elections included the promotion of themes relating to Black Lives Matter, as well as the promotion of antagonism toward the movement.

Russian operatives created hundreds of fake personas linked to social media accounts and began posting content that related to two different aspects of the Black Lives Matter movement. On one hand, posts promoted the Black Lives Matter cause by emphasising police brutality in the United States toward minority groups; on the other hand, other posts supported police divisions, strongly criticised any opposition to the police, and denounced the Black Lives Matter movement. In one instance, social media accounts used by Russia's Internet Research Agency simultaneously promoted opposing protests in New York City: one in support of the Black Lives Matter movement, and the other against it. In one case, Russian operatives even hired individuals to organise protests.

Researchers found that this interference campaign was performed with the following aims: to support Donald Trump's presidential campaign, to weaken Hillary Clinton's campaign, and to undermine public faith in the American democratic system and the electoral process.

=== 2020 US elections ===
According to scholars and American investigative journalists, Russian interference in the 2020 United States elections included the promotion of themes relating to Black Lives Matter. Often, the purpose of these actions included race-baiting. In 2020, the Internet Research Agency had outsourced to troll farms in Ghana and Nigeria, which created content for audiences on Facebook, Instagram and Twitter, the majority of whom were in the United States.

== See also ==
- Foreign exploitation of American race relations
- Russian disinformation
- Active measures
- And you are lynching Negroes, a Soviet whataboutist retort
- Soviet influence on the peace movement
- Communist propaganda
