= And you are lynching Negroes =

Soviet catchphrase against the United States

Freedom to the prisoners of Scottsboro, by Dmitri Moor, 1932

"And you are lynching Negroes" (Russian: "А у вас негров линчуют") (Note: A u vas negrov linchuyut (which means "Yet, in your [country], they lynch Negroes")) is a catchphrase that describes or satirizes the political rhetoric of the Soviet Union towards the United States in any instance of bilateral discourse in which the latter reproached the former's human rights violations. The remark also highlights a trend among Soviet media to frequently cover stumbling blocks in American internal affairs, such as financial crises and unemployment or racial discrimination and civil unrest, which were all presented as inherent failings of the capitalist system that had supposedly been erased by state communism.

Lynchings of African Americans were brought up as a "skeleton in the closet" for the United States—one that served as ammunition for Soviet propaganda in deflecting criticism of stumbling blocks in Soviet internal affairs. Since the dissolution of the Soviet Union in 1991, the phrase has become widespread as a retrospective reference that reveals the ongoing like-minded tactics of Russian disinformation campaigns against the United States, namely during periods of social or political upheaval among Americans.

Former Czech president and writer Václav Havel placed the phrase among "commonly canonized demagogical tricks"; the British newspaper The Economist described it as a form of whataboutism that became ubiquitous after the Soviet Union's dissolution; and the 1993 book Exit from Communism by American historian Stephen Richards Graubard identifies it as symbolizing a divorce from reality.

American author Michael Dobson compared usage of the phrase to the common Spanish-derived idiom "the pot calling the kettle black" and called it a "famous example" of tu quoque reasoning. The American conservative magazine National Review called it "a bitter Soviet-era punch line" and added "there were a million Cold War variations on the joke". The Israeli newspaper Haaretz described use of the idiom as a form of Soviet propaganda. The British liberal political website Open Democracy called the phrase "a prime example of whataboutism". In her 2017 work Security Threats and Public Perception, Dutch professor Elizaveta Gaufman described it as a tool to reverse someone's argument against them.

== History ==
=== Origin in the Russian Empire ===
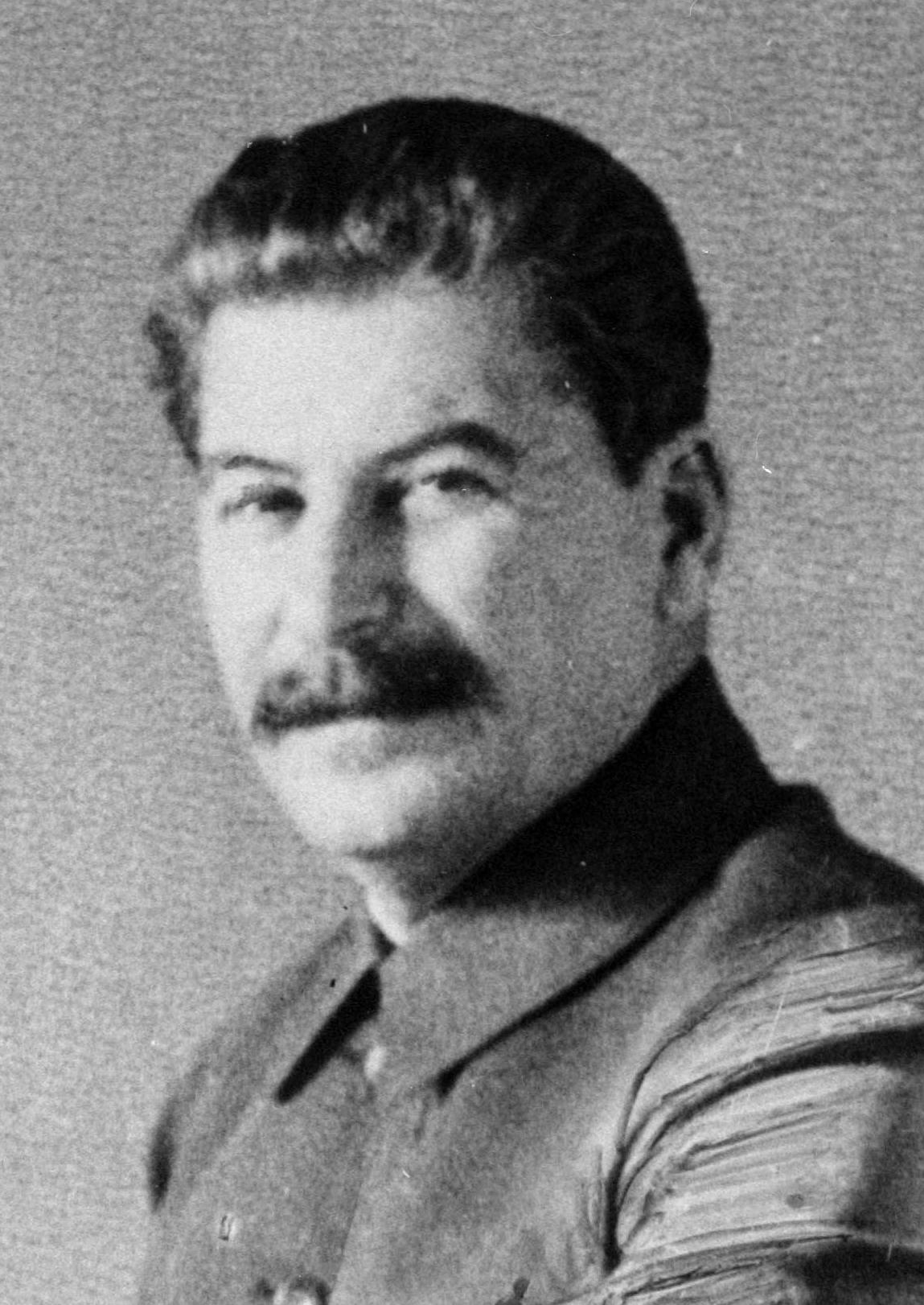
Use of the phrase was common in the Soviet Union during the Stalinist era.

The phrase was used as a Russian political joke about a dispute between an American and a Soviet man.

After receiving criticism of his country because of the deaths caused by the 1903 anti-Jewish Kishinev pogrom, the Russian Minister of the Interior Vyacheslav von Plehve pointed out "The Russian peasants were driven to frenzy. Excited by race and religious hatred, and under the influence of alcohol, they were worse than the people of the Southern States of America when they lynch negroes."

In a 1905 interview with The Century magazine, Leo Tolstoy criticised American culture, where despite "virtually no hindrances to individual development", yet "you lynch negroes, form trusts, and adopt imperialism."

=== Early usage by the Soviet Union ===
Soviet artist Dmitri Moor produced the lithograph Freedom to the Prisoners of Scottsboro!, after the 1931 trial of the Scottsboro Boys of Alabama. The treatment of the Scottsboro Boys popularized the phrase in usage by the Soviet Union against the US as a form of criticism against those who themselves criticized human rights abuses. In his 1934 book Russia Today: What Can We Learn from It?, Sherwood Eddy wrote: "In the most remote villages of Russia today Americans are frequently asked what they are going to do to the Scottsboro Negro boys and why they lynch Negroes."

In a 1930s argument with black student Pierre Kalmek, Bolshevik politician Dmitry Manuilsky said that in the United States "whites have the privilege to lynch Negroes, but Negroes do not have the privilege to lynch whites." He called this a form of white chauvinism, asking: "Do we have a difference here between the salaries of Negro and white workers? Do we have the right to lynch Negro citizens?"

During the Stalin era, praise for the quality of any aspect of US life prompted the rejoinder "Yes, but they lynch Blacks, don't they?" Throughout the 1930s, white men traveling from the US to the Soviet Union on business reported to the US consulate in Riga, Latvia, that locals asked them about the dichotomy between living in a free society and "the 'lynching' of blacks." The term worked its way into fiction literature books written in the country, and was seen in this context as criticism of foreigners. Years later a science fiction comic, Technique - The Youth – 1948. – No. 2 titled "In a world of crazy fantasy" (Russian: "В мире бредовой фантастики") featured a poem of political attacks on the cover which included a similar line: "Every planet's Negroes are being lynched there."

The phrase became a common witticism used among Soviet citizens; a parable involved a call-in program on Radio Moscow where any question about their living conditions was met with the answer: "In America, they lynch Negroes." A US citizen living in the Soviet Union in 1949 was arrested after complaining the government barred him from work; a local paper made fun of his expectation of fair treatment, writing of the US as "the country where they lynch Negroes." In 1949 Soviet author and war poet Konstantin Simonov gave a speech at a Soviet jubilee event honoring poet Alexander Pushkin (who had African ancestry), where he delineated between the Soviet Union and the Western world by simply using the phrase to refer to English speakers: "There is no need for those who hang Negroes to commemorate Pushkin!" Historian Abdurakhman Avtorkhanov wrote in his 1953 book The Reign of Stalin that Soviet media put forth the notion that US citizens "are unanimous in pursuing an anti-colour policy, and that the average American spends his time lynching negroes." Perpetuation of the phrase during the Soviet period engendered negative feelings towards the US from members of the working class.

=== Growth during the Cold War ===
During the Cold War, the leftist French publication Combat used the phrase to criticize the operations of the House Un-American Activities Committee, pointing out what it saw as corruption of "a nation that lynched blacks and hounded anyone accused of 'un-American' activities." Use of the phrase as a tu quoque fallacy grew in popularity in Russia during the 1960s, and was used as a widespread quip between Russians. In this version, an American and a Soviet car salesman argue which country makes better cars. Finally, the American asks: "How many decades does it take an average Soviet man to earn enough money to buy a Soviet car?" After a thoughtful pause, the Soviet replies: "And you are lynching Negroes!" The phrase garnered numerous iterations during the Cold War period. Its pervasiveness in Russian society reflected a strong sense of Soviet patriotism. When the government faced criticism for discrimination against Jews in the Soviet Union, the idiom was used with excessively sentimental tone to complain about racism in the United States. It was used as an aphorism among fellow Soviets during the Mikhail Gorbachev period, as an answer to complaints about the lack of civil and political rights including freedom of movement. A variant used during this time as a form of reciprocity when faced with criticism over imprisonment and treatment of Refuseniks, was to put the focus on race in the United States criminal justice system. A similar phrase was used to counter complaints about Soviet transportation inefficiency.

In 1980 then dissident and later president of the Czech Republic and writer Václav Havel characterized the phrase among "commonly canonized demagogical tricks." In scholarly research it has been described as "an increasingly powerful propaganda tool with the intensification of the Cold War".

==== Usage by Soviet satellite states ====
Alternate versions of the phrase have been used in Eastern European Soviet Republics and several Central European countries, then-controlled by the Soviet Union, such, that it was ported for usage in Poland. The phrase also saw usage in other languages, including Czech, Hungarian, and Romanian.

Similar phrases in the languages of Eastern Europe and Central Europe include:

- Czech: A vy zase bijete černochy! ("And, in turn, you beat up blacks!")
- Hungarian: Amerikában (pedig) verik a négereket ("And in America, they beat up Negroes")
- Polish: A u was Murzynów biją! ("And at your place, they beat up Negroes!")
- Romanian: Da, dar voi linșați negrii! ("Yes, but you are lynching Negroes!")
- Bulgarian: Да, а вие биете негрите! ("Yes, but you are beating up Negroes!")

In Westernized, high-income Central European countries that have cut their ties to the Russian cultural sphere following the dissolution of the Soviet Union, like Poland and Czech Republic, the phrase ceased to be used as the anti-American sentiment died down. In modern Poland, the context of the phrase is no longer understood.

=== Usage in post-1991 Russia ===
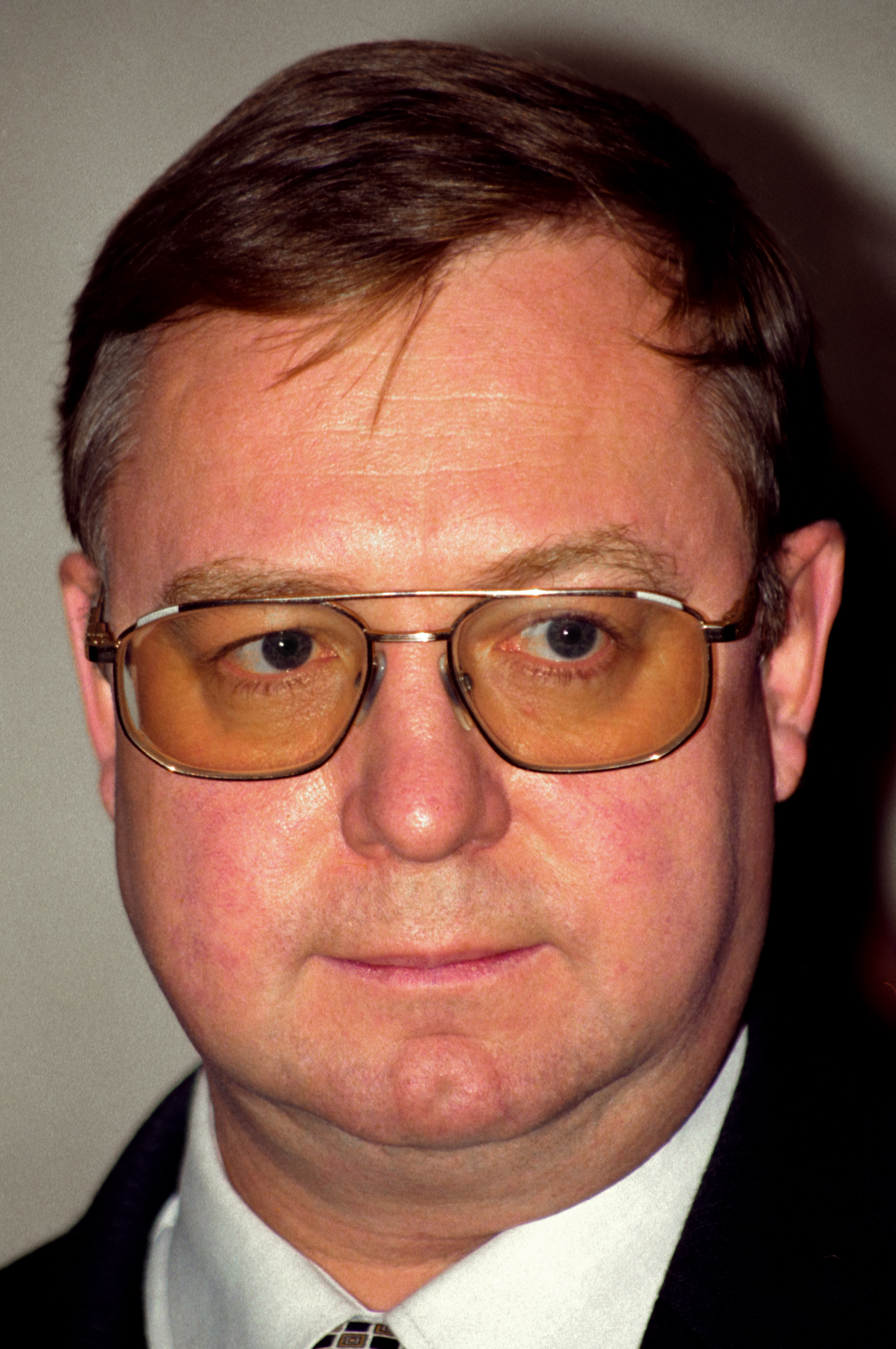
Prime Minister of Russia Sergei Stepashin unsuccessfully used the phrase in a joke in a 1999 visit to the National Press Club.

After the fall of the Soviet Union in 1991, the term had become a synecdoche in Russia, as a reference referring to all of Soviet propaganda. During a trip to Washington, D.C., in 1999, then-prime minister of Russia Sergei Stepashin attempted to tell a joke using the phrase as a punchline at a speech before the National Press Club. He faced a disturbing quiet from the audience in response to his attempt at humor, and he later observed those in the US have difficulty understanding the Russian perspective on comedy.

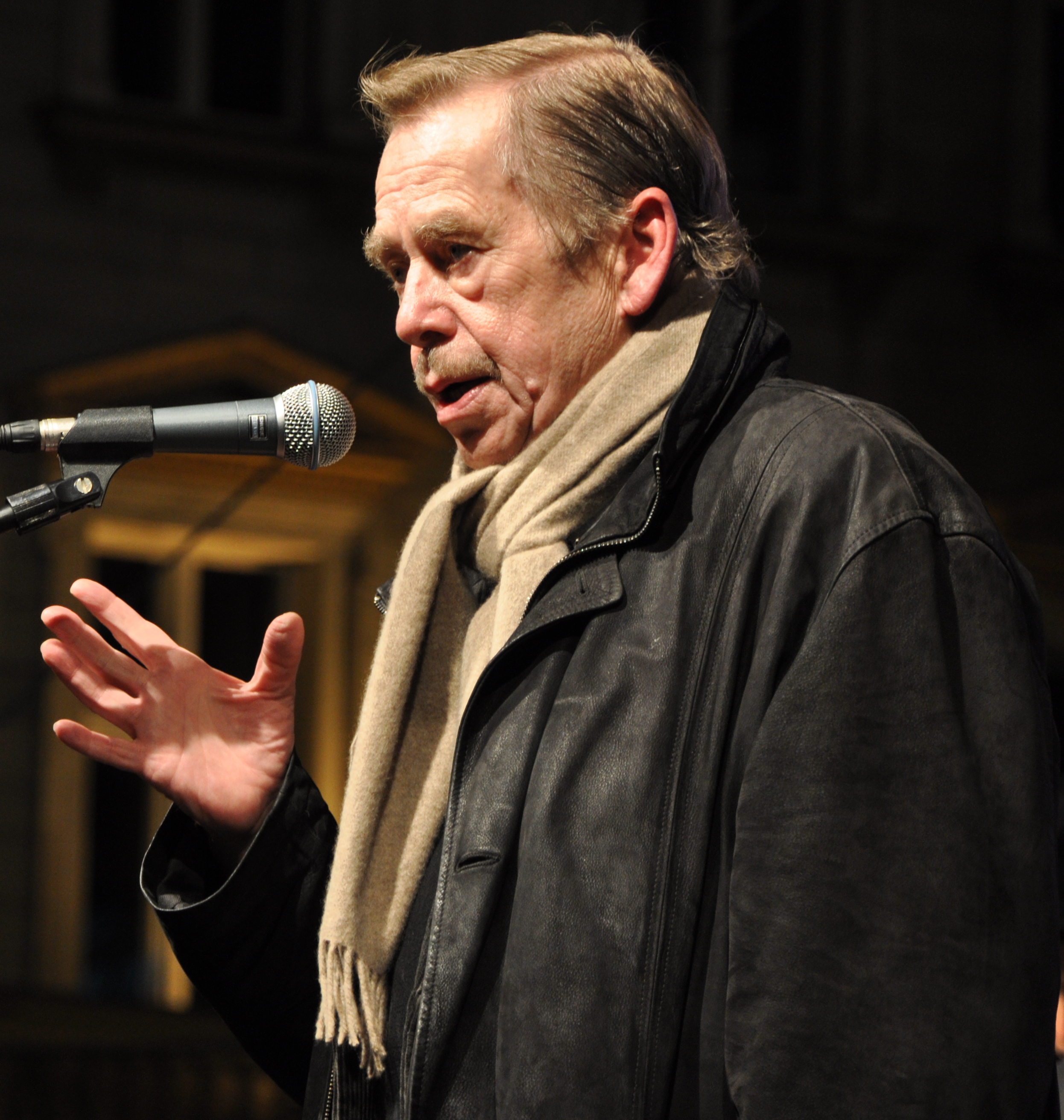
Václav Havel placed the idiom among "commonly canonized demagogical tricks".

In a January 2008 article, The Economist popularized the term whataboutism for the repeated usage of this rhetorical tactic in the Soviet Union. The magazine wrote, that the tactic became overused, and by the time of the 1991 dissolution of the Soviet Union, it had become a figure of speech which was used in reference to the entirety of Soviet propaganda.

With the election of Barack Obama as US president in November 2008, The New York Times expressed the hope that the tactic could see decreased usage: "In Russia, for example, where Soviet leaders used to respond to any American criticism of human rights violations with 'But you hang Negroes,' analysts note that the election of Mr. Obama removes a stain."

In a 2009 article, journalist George Feifer recounted that when he traveled to Moscow to cover the American National Exhibition in 1959, he faced those who were using the phrase against him. Feifer believed that: "Skilled propagandists stationed among the listeners regularly interrupted to repeat questions intended to discredit me. Why did America tolerate shameful poverty and lynch Negroes?" In 2011, author Michael Dobson wrote that the phrase was a form of the pot calling the kettle black, and a "famous example" of the tu quoque fallacy derived from a "famous 1960s era Russian joke."

During the Ferguson unrest in 2014 in Ferguson, Missouri, after a white policeman who shot and killed an unarmed black adolescent was not indicted, state-controlled press coverage in Russia was highly critical of racism in the United States. Writing for The Moscow Times, journalist Allison Quinn posited that coverage of the protests in Ferguson served as an optimal method to distract media from the Russo-Ukrainian war. Quinn said, "American racism provided a go-to argument of American hypocrisy for years under the Soviet Union, with phrases like 'Well, you lynch negroes' hurled back at the U.S. in response to any allegations of human rights violations in the Soviet Union." She compared the Ferguson unrest coverage by Russia state-controlled media to prior use of this phrase as a form of Soviet propaganda. Writing in March 2014 for the American liberal magazine The New Republic, Julia Ioffe made a similar comparison as Quinn regarding Soviet versus the 2014 use of the technique. Ioffe wrote that the phrase took the form of a "cartoonish reply", and had been extended after the fall of Soviet Russia to a similar strategy used by Vladimir Putin.

By 2015, the phrase had entered the common lexicon in Russia as a tool to criticize any form of US policy. Russians used the term between themselves so often it became a form of satire, as a ubiquitous rejoinder to all crises dealt with and low quality of life, including purchasing groceries or dealing with road congestion.

In a 2015 article for the conservative magazine National Review, correspondent Kevin D. Williamson called the phrase "a bitter Soviet-era punch line." Williamson pointed out: "There were a million Cold War variations on the joke". Reporter David Volodzko wrote for the international news magazine The Diplomat in 2015 about "the famous tu quoque argument". The piece said that the term was used as a way to criticize capitalism as practiced in the Western world. Writing for the British liberal political website Open Democracy in 2015, journalist Maxim Edwards observed: "The phrase 'and you are lynching Negroes' has entered Russian speech as a prime example of whataboutism, a hypothetical response to any American criticism of Soviet policies."

Michael Bohm, a US reporter who is working out of Moscow, became the target of the phrase after he appeared on Sunday Evening With Vladimir Solovyov, which aired on the major state-run television channel Russia-1. Commentator Igor Korotchenko wrote: "people like Bohm dropped atom bombs on Hiroshima and Nagasaki, they lynched Negroes." In a 2015 contribution to the Russian journal International Affairs, Russian Federation Deputy Foreign Minister Sergei Ryabkov and editor-in-chief Armen Oganesyan lamented the likelihood a Russian rejoinder to an international treaty's publication by the US State Department would be viewed as a form of the "you lynch Negroes" response. Ryabkov and Oganesyan wrote that this reaction harmed the collaborative process as it was important for nation-states to disagree and enable discourse.

Journalist Catherine Putz commented on the phrase in a July 2016 article for the international news magazine The Diplomat, and compared it to use of whataboutism by businessman and politician Donald Trump: "Criticisms of human rights in the Soviet Union were often met with what became a common catchphrase: 'And you are lynching Negroes'." Writing for ChinaFile after Trump won the 2016 United States presidential election, James Palmer feared an increase in racism "would give a brutal new credibility to the old Soviet whataboutism whenever they were challenged on the gulag: 'But in America, you lynch Negroes'." Writing in July 2016 for the liberal Israeli newspaper Haaretz, Israeli journalist Chemi Shalev made a similar comparison: "Trump told [T]he New York Times this week that America is in such a mess in terms of civil liberties that it cannot lecture foreign countries anymore, which is an echo of old Soviet propaganda that responded to American reprimands with the retort 'And you are lynching Negroes'." Shalev followed up on this analysis in a September 2016 article, writing: "Trump conducts pro-Russian propaganda along the same lines as the old retort 'And You Hang Blacks' with which the Soviets tried to deflect U.S. criticism of their human rights abuses. He isn't troubled by Putin's political opponents being murdered, because 'people get killed here too'."

Following the 2024 Russian presidential election, Vladimir Putin gave a speech after the close of voting on March 17. He acknowledged the February 2024 death of opposition leader Alexei Navalny, who had been held in a Russian penal colony, but did not comment as to the cause of death or who was ultimately responsible. "As for Mr. Navalny – yes, he passed away. It is always a sad event. And there were other cases when people in prisons passed away. Didn't this happen in the United States? It did, and not once."

=== Usage by other countries ===
In addition to Soviet Union and its satellites, and later, Russia, similar deflecting arguments related to racism in the United States have been used by a number of politicians, diplomats and state-controlled media from countries whose human rights abuses have been criticized by the United States government, NGOs or citizens. Countries which have been said to use the "Are you lynching Negroes" rhetoric in the early 21st century include China, Iran, Ba'athist Syria, and North Korea.

== Analysis ==
The 1993 book Exit from Communism, edited by Stephen Richards Graubard, argued that this saying encapsulated an overall divorce from reality: "Perhaps there are and perhaps there are not prison camps in Siberia, perhaps in the United States they do or perhaps they do not lynch blacks ... Ultimately it does not matter whether we are for real or just pretending: it is all just part of the story."

In her 2016 work Security Threats and Public Perception, Elizaveta Gaufman characterized the phrase as a form of reversing someone's line of reasoning against them. Gaufman wrote that by using this phrase in an argument, one was tacitly refusing to answer queries posed to them and instead responding with condemnations.

=== Agency of African Americans ===
It has been argued that African Americans have had a more nuanced position in this issue between the two states, highlighting their agency despite being used for propaganda gains of others. While repeatedly confronting the exploitation of African Americans by and for the gains of Soviet propaganda, African Americans have nevertheless been expanding on such use for the sake of the raised issue of racism and its institutionalization; this effect of the instrumentalisation is being often lost when discussing the issue, and has been criticized. African-American novelist Zora Neale Hurston was a staunch anti-communist, and she wrote a 1951 essay titled "Why The Negro Won't Buy Communism" which criticized communist propaganda targeting African Americans.

== See also ==
- Ad hominem
- "A man was lynched yesterday" flag
- Antanagoge
- Black Lives Matter
- Character assassination
- Clean hands
- Discrediting tactic
- "Do you condemn Hamas?"
- Double standard
- Fallacy of relative privation
- False equivalence
- "Physician, heal thyself"
- Poisoning the well
- Precedent
- Psychological projection
- Race card
- Recrimination
- Red herring
- The Mote and the Beam
- "Two wrongs make a right"
- Victor's justice
- "Where have you been for eight years?"
