= Divorce in the United States =

In the United States, marriage and divorce fall under the jurisdiction of state governments, not the federal government. Divorce may involve issues of spousal support, child custody, child support, distribution of property and division of debt.

== History ==
=== Colonial and revolutionary period ===
The British colonies that became the United States individually adapted English common law on divorce to their religious, economic, and ethnic differences. At the time, divorce in England was rare and expensive, and applicants were required to petition Parliament or an ecclesiastical court to obtain a divorce.

The New England Colonies, viewing marriage as a civil contract, were the most likely to grant divorces, given sufficient cause. Between 1692 and 1786, only 90 divorces were granted in England and Wales, while 143 were granted in Massachusetts. The Southern Colonies, on the other hand, hewed more closely to English practice and seldom granted divorces.

The tension between colonial legislatures and Parliament included dissension on the grounds and accessibility of divorce, with Parliament invalidating divorces granted in Pennsylvania, New Jersey, and New Hampshire. In 1773, the royal governors were ordered to deny approval to any divorce acts passed by colonial legislatures.

After the colonies gained independence, states joining the union liberalized their divorce laws, as did the associated territories, with many permitting local courts to grant divorce. A few retained authority to grant divorce at the state level. In Virginia, for example, petitioners had to apply to the Virginia General Assembly for a divorce, and during the first thirty years of statehood, no female petitioner was granted a divorce.

=== 19th century ===
By the mid- to late 19th century, divorce rates in the United States increased, and Americans obtained more divorces annually than were granted in all of Europe. Previously, divorces in the US were mainly granted to the middle and upper-classes due to their cost, but the legal process became less expensive. Other proposed explanations include the popular acceptance of divorce as an alternative to marital unhappiness, decay of the belief in immortality and future punishment, discontent with the existing constitution of society, the habits of mobility created by better transportation, and the greater independence of women resulting in their enlarged legal rights and greater opportunities of self support. The divorce rate continued to increase in the early 20th century. In 1890, 3 couples per 1,000 were divorced, rising to 8 couples by 1920.

The Married Women's Property Acts in the United States were passed by the various states to give greater property rights to women and, in some cases, allowing them to sue for divorce.

The women's rights movement debated the issue of whether to allow divorce, with Jane Swisshelm and Elizabeth Cady Stanton as early supporters, with Horace Greeley and Antoinette Brown Blackwell opposed. Unlike other issues, the movement was unable to achieve agreement. Stanton eventually came to see marriage law reform as more important than women's voting rights. Against Stanton, Lucy Stone sought to remove the advocacy of divorce from the women's platform to prevent the appearance of moral laxity. In government, Robert Dale Owen proposed laws granting greater freedom of divorce, which later came to fruition. The National Woman Suffrage Association, founded in 1869, included advocacy for divorce reform.

=== 20th century ===
Prior to the latter decades of the 20th century, divorce was considered to be against the public interest, and civil courts refused to grant a divorce except if one party to the marriage had betrayed the "innocent spouse." Thus, a spouse suing for divorce in most states had to show a "fault" such as abandonment, cruelty, incurable mental illness, or adultery. If an "innocent" husband and wife wished to separate, or if both were guilty, "neither would be allowed to escape the bonds of marriage." Divorce was barred if evidence revealed any hint of complicity between spouses to manufacture grounds for divorce, such as if the suing party engaged in procurement or connivance (contributing to the fault, such as by arranging for adultery), condonation (forgiving the fault either explicitly or by continuing to cohabit after knowing of it), or recrimination (the suing spouse also being guilty).

Divorce is governed by state rather than federal law, and a number of strategies were devised in several states to make divorce easier. By 1909, Reno, Nevada, was "the divorce capital of the world." At that time, only six months in Nevada established state residency, and the Nevada courts, well aware of the contribution of divorce seekers to Nevada's hospitality industry, accepted the resident's uncorroborated assertion of grounds for divorce, usually "extreme cruelty". In 1927, the Nevada Legislature, "in response to a perceived threat to Reno's divorce supremacy from France and Mexico and a divorce-trade war that had been going on since the end of World War I between Nevada, Idaho, and Arkansas," lowered the residency period to three months, and in 1931 the Legislature that voted for "wide-open gambling" lowered it to six weeks. Providing accommodations and other amenities for visitors, who could not leave Nevada during the six weeks, became a major Reno industry; greeters met the arriving trains, and there were a variety of divorce ranches. In 1942, the U.S. Supreme Court ruled in Williams v. North Carolina that other states had to recognize these divorces, under the "full faith and credit" clause of the U.S. Constitution.

By 1916, the U.S. led the world in number of divorces. In populous New York State, where adultery was the easiest grounds for divorce, attorneys would provide a divorce package of a prostitute and a photographer. Significant numbers of divorce seekers went to the cities on the Mexican side of the Mexico-U.S. border, or to Haiti, where they found welcoming attorneys, who sometimes advertised in the U.S.A. Memory of the practice is reflected in the song "Haitian Divorce," by Steely Dan.

By the 1960s, deception to bypass the fault system had become a widespread concern, if not actually a widespread practice, and a consensus grew for change. The National Association of Women Lawyers was instrumental in convincing the American Bar Association to create a Family Law section in many state courts, and pushed strongly for no-fault divorce law around 1960 (cf. Uniform Marriage and Divorce Act). In 1969, California became the first U.S. state to pass a no-fault divorce law.

The introduction of no-fault divorce led to a rise in divorce rates in the United States during the 1970s. The National Center for Health Statistics reported that from 1975 to 1988 in the US, in families with children present, wives filed for divorce in approximately two-thirds of cases. In 1975, 71.4% of the cases were filed by women, and in 1988, 65% were filed by women. However, some states placed restriction on divorce during the same period. For example, Missouri in 1973, the same year no-fault divorce was passed in the state, passed a statute that prevented divorce during pregnancy. The initial intention was to ensure the mother received financial support after the birth of the child, but in practice the law kept pregnant women in abusive environments longer.

Lenore Weitzman's 1985 book The Divorce Revolution, using data from California in 1977-78, reported that one year after divorce, the standard of living for women declined 73%, compared with an increase of 42% for men. Richard Peterson calls Weitzman's methodology into question, using the same data to calculate a 27% decrease for women and a 10% increase for men.

=== 21st century ===
The median length for a marriage in the US is 11 years as of 2014, with 90% of divorces settled out of court. Lower-income couples are more likely to get a divorce than higher-income couples. By the seventh wedding anniversary, the divorce rate among highly educated people who married in the early 2000s is 11%, while that for couples without college degrees is 17%.

In 2015, the Manhattan Supreme Court ruled that, in the case of a husband and wife who did not live together, where the husband had no fixed physical address where divorce papers could be served and where the husband had no written contact with his wife other than through Facebook, the wife could serve her husband divorce papers through a Facebook message, and she became the first to do so.

== Law ==
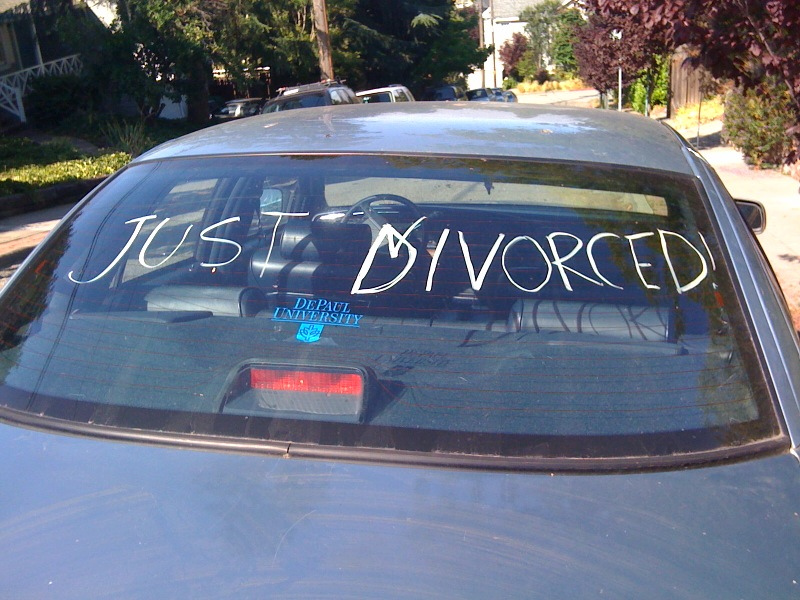
Just divorced sign

Divorce in the U.S. is governed by state rather than federal law. The laws of the states of residence at the time of divorce govern, not those of the location where the couple was married. All states recognize divorces granted by any other state, and all impose a minimum time of residence to file for a divorce, Nevada and Idaho currently being the shortest at six weeks.

All states allow no-fault divorce on grounds such as irreconcilable differences, irremediable breakdown, and loss of affection. Some states mandate a separation period before no-fault divorce. Mississippi, South Dakota and Tennessee are the only states that require mutual consent for no-fault divorce. The rest of the states permit unilateral no-fault divorce.

Since the mid-1990s, three states have enacted covenant marriage laws which give couples the option to make divorce more difficult: Louisiana, Arkansas, and Arizona. For example, couples who choose covenant marriage may be required to undergo counseling before a divorce can be granted, or to submit their conflicts to mediation. In states lacking such provisions, some couples sign contracts undertaking the same obligations.

A summary (or simple) divorce, available in some jurisdictions, is used when spouses meet certain eligibility requirements, or can agree on key issues beforehand. For example, to qualify for summary divorce in California, a couple must meet all of the following requirements:

- Have been married less than five years,
- Have no children together,
- Do not own any real property,
- Do not rent any real property other than current dwelling,
- Do not owe more than $6,000 for debts since date of marriage,
- Own less than $41,000 in community property (property acquired during marriage), not counting vehicles,
- Do not own more than $41,000 in separate property (property acquired before marriage), not counting vehicles,
- Agree to forgo spousal support,
- Have a signed agreement which divides property (including cars) and debts, and
- Meet residency requirement if applicable.

=== Grounds for divorce ===
Though divorce laws vary between jurisdiction, there are two basic approaches to divorce: fault-based and no-fault. Fault grounds, when available, are sometimes still sought. This may be done where it reduces the waiting period otherwise required, or possibly in hopes of affecting decisions related to a divorce, such as child custody, child support, alimony, and so on. A court may still take into account the behavior of the parties when dividing property, debts, evaluating custody, and support. States vary in the admissibility of such evidence for those decisions.

==== No-fault divorce ====
Under a no-fault divorce system the dissolution of a marriage does not require an allegation or proof of fault of either party. Only three states: (Mississippi, South Dakota, and Tennessee) require mutual consent (in Tennessee, it is needed only in certain circumstances) for a no-fault divorce to be granted. No-fault grounds for divorce include incompatibility, irreconcilable differences, and irremediable breakdown of the marriage.

==== At-fault divorce ====
Fault divorces used to be the only way to break a marriage, and people who had differences, but did not qualify as "at fault", only had the option to separate (and were prevented from legally remarrying).

However, there are ways (defenses) to prevent a fault divorce: collusion, condonation, connivance, provocation, and recrimination. A defense is expensive, and not usually practical as eventually most divorces are granted.

Comparative rectitude is a doctrine used to determine which spouse is more at fault when both spouses are guilty of breaches.

=== Jurisdiction ===
In the United States, the federal government does not have the authority to issue a divorce. The state has the only authority over issuing accepting a marriage, and issuing a divorce. This creates the question of which state can one get divorced in. All states have rules for jurisdiction, which is typically a time frame the person filing the divorce has lived in the state. Most states require the person filing for a divorce to be a physical resident of the state for six months. Some states require twelve months and some states, like Nevada, require only six weeks. Without proper jurisdiction, a state cannot issue a divorce.

=== Property division ===
States vary in their rules for division of assets in a divorce. The major difference is between states that use a community property system and states that do not. In community property states, community property belongs to the spouses equally. The following states use community property regimes: Arizona, California, Idaho, Louisiana, Nevada, New Mexico, Texas, Washington, and Wisconsin. Alaskan law gives couples the option to create community property by written agreement.

Most community property states start with the presumption that community assets will be divided equally, whereas "equitable distribution" states presume fairness may dictate more or less than half of the assets will be awarded to one spouse or the other. Commonly, assets acquired before marriage are considered individual, and assets acquired after, marital. Depending on the state, an equitable or equal division of assets is then sought.

=== Alimony ===
Alimony, also known as 'maintenance' or 'spousal support', is granted in many cases, especially in longer term marriages where there is an income disparity. Alimony is more likely in cases where a spouse has remedial needs that must be met for the spouse to become fully employable; for example that one spouse gave up career opportunities or development in order to devote themselves to the family.

In some states, educational degrees earned during the marriage may be considered marital property. In such states, the divorce will often entail payment from the educated spouse to the other spouse a share of their expected future earnings that are due to a degree they earned during the marriage.

In the U.S., state law establishes requirements regarding alimony (and child support) payments, recovery and penalties. A spouse trying to recover back alimony sometimes may use the collection procedures that are available to all other creditors, such as reporting the amount due to a collection agency, or seek enforcement through contempt of court proceedings against an obligor who has failed to pay. Alimony obligations are not dischargeable in bankruptcy.

The determination of alimony varies greatly from state to state within the U.S. Some state statutes, including those of Texas, Montana, Kansas, Utah, Kentucky and Maine, give explicit guidelines to judges on the amount and duration of alimony. In Texas, Mississippi and Tennessee, for example, alimony is awarded only in cases of marriage or civil union of ten years or longer and the payments are limited to three years unless there are special, extenuating circumstances. Also, in Texas, there is a legal presumption that alimony is not appropriate. Once the requesting spouse can reasonably demonstrate that the best effort has been given in good faith to secure an independent income but failed, only then the case is taken into consideration. Furthermore, the amount of spousal support in Texas is limited to the lesser of $5,000 per month or 20% of the payee's gross income. In Delaware, spousal support is usually not awarded in marriages of less than 10 years. In Kansas, alimony awards cannot exceed 121 months. In Utah, the duration of alimony cannot exceed the length of the marriage. In Maine, Mississippi, and Tennessee alimony is awarded in marriages or civil union of 10 to 20 years and the duration is half the length of the marriage barring extenuating circumstances.

Other states, including California, Nevada and New York, have relatively vague statutes which simply list the "factors" a judge should consider when determining alimony (see list of factors below). In these states, the determination of duration and amount of alimony is left to the discretion of the family court judges who must consider case law in each state. In Mississippi, Texas and Tennessee, for example, there are 135 Appellate Cases in addition to 47 sections of State Statute that shape divorce law. As a result of these Appellate Cases, for example, Mississippi judges cannot order an end date to any alimony award.

For divorce judgments dated January 1, 2019 and later, under federal law spousal support is treated as not-taxable and non-deductible for either party.

==== Types and factors ====
In general, there are four types of alimony:

1. Temporary alimony: Support ordered when the parties are separated prior to divorce. Also called alimony pendente lite, which is Latin, meaning, "pending the suit".
2. Rehabilitative alimony: Support given to a lesser-earning spouse for a period of time necessary to acquire paid work and become self-sufficient.
3. Permanent alimony: Support paid to the lesser-earning spouse until the death of the payor, the death of the recipient, or the remarriage of the recipient.
4. Reimbursement alimony: Support given as a reimbursement for expenses incurred by a spouse during the marriage (such as educational expenses).

Some of the possible factors that bear on the amount and duration of the support are:

Factor	Description
Length of the marriage or civil union	Generally, alimony lasts for a term or period. However, it will last longer if the marriage or civil union lasted longer. A marriage or civil union of over 20 years is often a candidate for permanent alimony.
Time separated while still married	In some states, separation is a triggering event, recognized as the end of the term of the marriage. Other states do not recognize separation or legal separation. In a state not recognizing separation, a two-year marriage followed by an eight-year separation will generally be treated like a ten-year marriage.
Age of the parties at the time of the divorce	Generally, more youthful spouses are considered to be more able to 'get on' with their lives, and therefore thought to require shorter periods of support.
Relative income of the parties	In states that recognize a right of the spouses to live 'according to the means to which they have become accustomed', alimony attempts to adjust the incomes of the spouses so that they are able to approximate, as best possible, their prior lifestyle.
Future financial prospects of the parties	A spouse who is going to realize significant income in the future is likely to have to pay higher alimony than one who is not.
Health of the parties	Poor health goes towards need, and potentially an inability to support oneself. Courts are disinclined to leave one party indigent.
Fault in marital breakdown	In states where fault is recognized, fault can significantly affect alimony, even nullifying it. Many states are 'no-fault' states, where one does not have to show fault to get divorced. No-fault divorce spares the spouses the acrimony of the 'fault' processes, and closes the eyes of the court to improper spousal behavior. In Georgia, however, a person who has an affair that causes the divorce is not entitled to alimony.

==== Prenuptial agreements ====
Prenuptial agreements are recognized in all fifty states and the District of Columbia, and every jurisdiction allows parties to agree to spousal support and alimony terms in a premarital or postnuptial agreement, if their marital agreement is prepared in accordance with state and federal law requirements. Divorce courts retain the discretion to refuse to enforce prenuptial agreement terms restricting a party's right to seek alimony if that party would have to seek public assistance as a result of the alimony waiver, or if the restriction on the right to seek alimony is unconscionable or unfair when the divorce occurs. Lack of financial disclosure prior to signing a prenuptial agreement or a post-nuptial agreement by the party against whom alimony is sought may also cause a court to invalidate a waiver of alimony provision. Prenuptial Agreements with valid alimony waivers or restrictions entered into in one state should be fully enforceable by the courts of another state in the event of a divorce, unless the terms of the prenuptial agreement are in material violation of the foreign jurisdiction's laws.

California is the only state with a law that requires that the parties be represented by counsel if spousal support (alimony) is limited by the agreement.

Instead of a complete waiver of the right to seek alimony, prenuptial agreements and post-nuptial agreements can also contain terms where the parties agree to a set amount of guaranteed alimony for the lower wage earner at the time of divorce, or a limit on the amount of alimony either party can seek in the event of a divorce.

==== Reform ====
In the United States, family laws and precedents as they relate to divorce, community property and alimony vary based on state law. Also, with new family models, "working couples", "working wives", "stay-at-home dads", etc., there are situations where some parties to a divorce question whether traditional economic allocations made in a divorce are fair and equitable to the facts of their individual case. Some groups have proposed various forms of legislation to reform alimony parameters (i.e. amounts and term). Alimony terms are among the most frequent issues causing litigation in family law cases. Eighty percent of divorce cases involve a request for modification of alimony.

In 2012, Massachusetts signed into law comprehensive alimony reform law that sets limits on alimony and eliminates lifetime alimony. Similarly, in 2013, Colorado signed into law alimony reform, creating a standardized non-presumptive guideline upon which courts can rely.

Some states (e.g. Florida, Texas, Maine) are moving away from permanent alimony awards that are intended to maintain a spouse's standard of living enjoyed during the marriage and are moving towards durational or rehabilitative alimony. In other states, like Mississippi and Tennessee, alimony is usually awarded for life.

Some of the critical issues that proponents and opponents of alimony reform disagree upon are:

- Whether alimony should be temporary or permanent
- Regardless of duration, should alimony payers have the unquestionable right to retire?
- Does the lesser earning spouse deserve alimony to meet his or her basic needs (sustenance) or enough to sustain "the lifestyle accustomed to during the civil union or marriage"?
- Should the income and assets of a new spouse be used in determining how much alimony gets paid?
- How clear and prescriptive should state statutes be versus allowing a larger degree of Judicial Discretion?

In 2012, bills were introduced in the New Jersey Assembly and Senate. The Assembly passed a bill calling for a Blue Ribbon Commission to address Alimony Reform. The Senate has a similar bill pending that has not yet been posted in the Judiciary Committee. The New Jersey Matrimonial Bar Association and the Family Law section of the New Jersey State Bar Association have been vehemently fighting against alimony reform, arguing that the New Jersey State Bar Association objected to the inclusion of individuals with a vested interest in reforming alimony on the Blue Ribbon Commission, and supported the establishment of a commission to study alimony reform but "only as long as the commission is constituted so that a fair and unbiased review of the current alimony laws takes place…[and] should not be predisposed to an outcome…."

In 2023, Florida passed an alimony reform bill (SB 1416) which eliminated permanent alimony and established a process for allowing alimony payers to request modifications when they want to retire. The bill allowed judges to reduce or terminate alimony obligations based on a number of factors. The passage came after decades of contentious debate garnering three vetoes of similar bills. Some groups that were previously major opponents of the reform approved of the 2023 policy, such as Florida Family Fairness and The Florida Bar.

California, Connecticut, Georgia, Illinois, Oklahoma, New York, South Carolina, Tennessee, Utah, and West Virginia have all passed laws that allow for the modification or termination of alimony upon demonstration that the recipient is cohabitating with another person. In April 2009, the Governor of New Jersey, Jon Corzine, signed into law changes in the alimony statutes for his state which would bar alimony payments to parents who kill, abuse, or abandon their children.

In 2024, Missouri passed House bill 2402 to allow pregnant women to get divorced. Under current laws, women are not allowed to get divorced during pregnancy.

=== Child custody ===
In cases involving children, governments have a pressing interest in ensuring that disputes between parents do not spill over into the family courts. All states require parents to file a parenting plan, or to decide on child custody and visitation either by reaching a written agreement or in a court hearing, when they legally separate or divorce.

The spouse given custody (or the spouse with the greater share of residence time in the case of joint custody), may receive child support to compensate their greater child-care expenses.

=== Alternatives to litigation ===
==== Collaborative divorce ====
Collaborative divorce (uncontested divorce) is becoming a popular method for divorcing couples to come to agreement on divorce issues. In a collaborative divorce, the parties negotiate an agreed resolution with the assistance of attorneys who are trained in the collaborative divorce process and in mediation, and often with the assistance of a neutral financial specialist or divorce coach. The parties are empowered to make their own decisions based on their own needs and interests, but with complete information and full professional support. Once the collaborative divorce starts, the lawyers are disqualified from representing the parties in a contested legal proceeding, should the collaborative law process end prematurely. Most attorneys who practice collaborative divorce claim that it can be substantially less expensive than other divorce methods (regular divorce or mediation). However, should the parties not reach any agreements, any documents or information exchanged during the collaborative process cannot later be used in further legal proceedings, as the collaborative process is confidential proceedings. Furthermore, there are no set enforceable time lines for completion of a divorce using collaborative divorce.

==== Mediated divorce ====
Divorce mediation is an alternative to traditional divorce litigation that attempts to help opposing spouses find common ground during the divorce process. In a divorce mediation session, a mediator facilitates the discussion between the spouses by assisting with communication and providing information and suggestions to help resolve differences. At the end of the mediation process, the separating parties will have typically developed a tailored divorce agreement that they can submit to the court. Parties to mediation do not need to retain attorneys. However, if the parties choose to retain attorneys their attorneys may be included in the mediation session. The mediator can provide both parties with information but will not offer advice to either. Divorce mediators may be attorneys, mental health professionals, or financial experts who have experience in divorce cases. Divorce mediation can be significantly less expensive than litigation. The adherence rate to mediated agreements is much higher than that of adherence to court orders.

==== Summary divorce ====
Many states allow for couples to file for a summary divorce based upon a jointly filed divorce petition. A summary divorce means the spouses have discussed the terms required by state law to issue a divorce and they have reached a mutual agreement. Almost every state allows for this type of "uncontested" divorce. An uncontested joint divorce petition will often save a divorcing couple both time and money.

=== Federal laws ===
Since the 1980s, federal legislation has been enacted affecting the rights and responsibilities of divorcing spouses. For example, federal welfare reform mandated the creation of child support guidelines in all 50 states in the 1980s. ERISA includes provisions for the division of qualified retirement accounts between divorcing spouses. The IRS established rules on ignoring alimony as a source of taxable income. Federal bankruptcy laws prohibit discharging in bankruptcy of alimony and child support obligations. COBRA allows a divorced spouse to obtain and maintain health insurance.

A "qualified domestic relations order" (QDRO) assigns to an alternate payee the right to receive all or a portion of a participant's retirement plan benefits. The order must include certain information and meet other requirements. A domestic relations order is made under state law and relates to child support, alimony payments, or marital property rights for the benefit of a spouse, former spouse, child, or other dependents of a participant. A state authority, generally a court, must issue an order or otherwise formally approve a property settlement agreement before it can be a domestic relations order under ERISA.

== Statistics ==
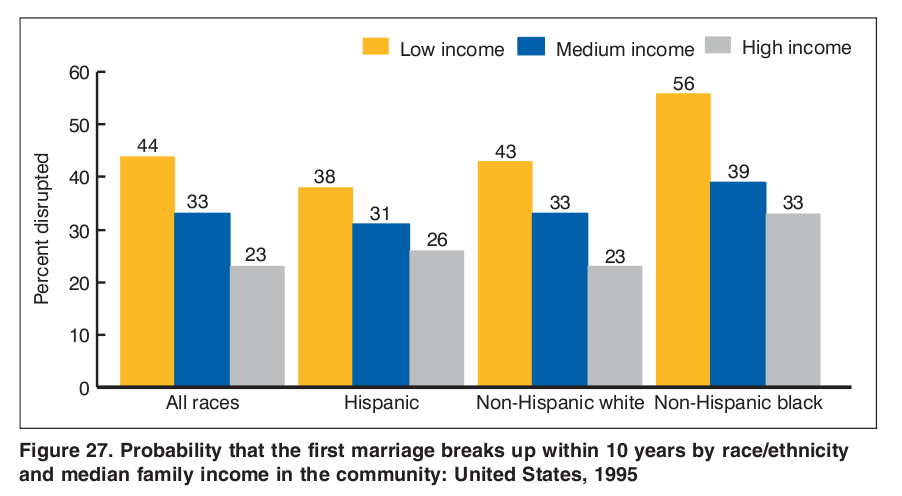
Probability of divorce by ethnicity and income

=== Initiation ===
According to a 2000 study, women file more than two-thirds of divorce cases in the US. The numbers have varied over time, with about 60% of filings by women for most of the 20th century, and over 70% by women in some states just after no-fault divorce was introduced, according to the paper.

The person filing the paperwork is not automatically the person who desired the divorce, but there is some correlation. A study of heterosexual divorces initiated between 2009 and 2015 found that 20% were the result of a mutual decision, 20% were primarily the man's choice, and 60% were primarily the woman's choice. By contrast, breakups of unmarried cohabiting couples were equally divided, with about one-third being a mutual decision, one-third being initiated by the man, and one-third being initiated by the woman.

=== Custody ===
In their 1997 study titled "Child Custody Policies and Divorce Rates in the US," Kuhn and Guidubaldi find it reasonable to conclude that women anticipate advantages to being single, rather than remaining married. In their detailed analysis of divorce rates, Kuhn and Guidubaldi conclude that acceptance of joint physical custody may reduce divorce. States whose family law policies, statutes, or judicial practice encourage joint custody have shown a greater decline in their divorce rates than those that favor sole custody.

=== Rates of divorce ===
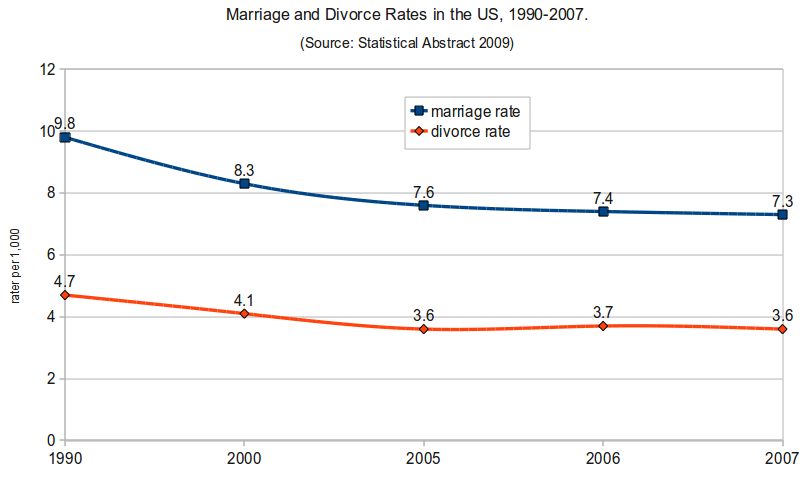
Marriage and divorce rates in the US 1990-2007

"Rate of divorce" usually refers to the number of divorces that occur in the population during a given period. However it is also used in common parlance to refer to the likelihood of a given marriage ending in divorce (as opposed to the death of a spouse).

In 2002 (latest survey data as of 2012), 29% of first marriages among women aged 15–44 were disrupted (ended in separation, divorce or annulment) within 10 years. Beyond the 10-year window, population survey data is lacking, but forecasts and estimates provide some understanding. It is commonly claimed that half of all marriages in the United States eventually end in divorce, an estimate possibly based on the fact that in any given year, the number of marriages is about twice the number of divorces. Amato outlined in his study on divorce that in the late 1990s, about 43% to 46% of marriages were predicted to end in dissolution. According to his research, only a small percentage of marriages end in permanent separation rather than divorce. Using 1995 data, National Survey of Family Growth forecast in 2002 a 43% chance that first marriages among women aged 15–44 would be disrupted within 15 years. More recently, having spoken with academics and National Survey of Family Growth representatives, PolitiFact.com estimated in 2012 that the lifelong probability of a marriage ending in divorce is 40%–50%.

Variables that may affect rates of divorce include:

- race or ethnicity,
- importance of religion to the couple,
- divorce in family of origin,
- timing of the first birth of any children (before marriage, within seven months, after seven months, or never) or
- if one spouse has generalized anxiety disorder.

A 2008 study by Jenifer L. Bratter and Rosalind B. King conducted on behalf of the Education Resources Information Center examined whether crossing racial boundaries increased the risk of divorce. Using the 2002 National Survey of Family Growth (Cycle VI), the likelihood of divorce for interracial couples to that of same-race couples was compared. Comparisons across marriage cohorts revealed that, overall, interracial couples have higher rates of divorce, particularly for those that married during the late 1980s. The authors found that gender plays a significant role in interracial divorce dynamics: According to the adjusted models predicting divorce as of the tenth year of marriage, interracial marriages that are the most vulnerable involve White females and non-White males (with the exception of White females and Hispanic White males) relative to White-White couples. White wife-Black husband marriages are twice as likely to divorce by the tenth year of marriage compared to White-White couples. Conversely, White men-non-White women couples show either very little or no differences in divorce rates. Asian wife-White husband marriages show only 4% greater likelihood of divorce by the tenth year of marriage than White-White couples. In the case of Black wife-White husband marriages, divorce by the tenth year of marriage is 44% less likely than among White-White unions. Intermarriages that did not cross a racial barrier, which was the case for White-Hispanic White couples, showed statistically similar likelihoods of divorcing as White-White marriages.

A 2011 study at the University of Iowa found that a woman's loss of virginity before age 18 was correlated with a greater number of occurrences of divorce within the first 10 years of marriage.

A 2012 study cited by Pew Research Center found that an estimated 78% of women with bachelor's degrees, and 65% of men with bachelor's degrees who married between 2006-2010 can expect their marriages to last at least two decades. Women with a high school degree or less, on the other hand, face a 40% probability of their marriages surviving the same period.

Studies have shown that men who "earn high incomes have a decreased probability of getting a divorce". However, higher income makes a woman's chances of marriage less likely and it has no connection to possible divorces. In 1995, divorce rates have gone down due to education rates going up. This is because educated individuals make higher incomes in most cases, which result in less financial stress when couples set down to get married. Lower income couples value and respect marriage just as much as higher income couples, however lower income couples are more likely to get a divorce because of financial strains on their marriage. Having low income is not the only factor that can potentially lead to divorce. Religious beliefs, morals and compatibility all come into play when it comes to long term marital statuses.

==== Divorce rate by state ====
The following lists the number of divorces annually per 1,000 population in each state:

State	Marriage rate^{[2]}														Divorce rate^{[1]}													
State	1990	1995	2000	2005	2010	2011	2012	2013	2014	2015	2016	2017	2018	2019	1990	1995	2000	2005	2010	2011	2012	2013	2014	2015	2016	2017	2018	2019
Alabama	10.6	9.8	10.1	9.2	8.2	8.4	8.2	7.8	7.8	7.4	7.1	7.0	6.8	6.7	6.1	6.0	5.5	4.9	4.4	4.3	3.6	3.7	3.8	3.9	3.8	3.7	3.7	3.6
Alaska	10.2	9.0	8.9	8.2	8.0	7.8	7.2	7.3	7.5	7.4	7.1	6.9	6.7	6.5	5.5	5.0	3.9	4.3	4.7	4.8	4.5	4.5	4.0	4.1	3.9	3.6	3.7	3.6
Arizona	10.0	8.8	7.5	6.6	5.9	5.7	5.6	5.4	5.8	5.9	5.9	5.8	5.5	5.3	6.9	6.2	4.6	4.2	3.5	3.9	4.3	3.9	3.9	3.6	3.4	3.5	3.0	2.9
Arkansas	15.3	14.4	15.4	12.9	10.8	10.4	10.9	9.8	10.1	10.0	9.9	9.5	8.9	8.4	6.9	6.3	6.4	6.0	5.7	5.3	5.3	5.0	4.8	4.8	3.9	3.7	4.1	4.0
California	7.9	6.3	5.8	6.4	5.8	5.8	6.0	6.5	6.4	6.2	6.5	6.3	6.0	5.7	4.3	–	–	–	–	–	–	–	–	–	–	–	–	–
Colorado	9.8	9.0	8.3	7.6	6.9	7.0	6.8	6.5	7.1	6.8	7.4	7.3	7.6	7.3	5.5	4.8	4.7	4.4	4.3	4.4	4.3	4.1	3.9	3.7	3.6	3.2	3.3	3.3
Connecticut	7.9	6.6	5.7	5.8	5.6	5.5	5.2	5.0	5.4	5.3	5.6	5.6	5.3	5.0	3.2	2.9	3.3	3.0	2.9	3.1	2.7	2.8	2.6	3.1	3.2	2.9	2.9	2.7
Delaware	8.4	7.3	6.5	5.9	5.2	5.2	5.8	6.6	6.0	5.7	5.6	5.5	5.2	5.0	4.4	5.0	3.9	3.8	3.5	3.6	3.5	3.4	3.3	3.1	3.1	3.0	2.8	2.9
District of Columbia	8.2	6.1	4.9	4.1	7.6	8.7	8.4	10.8	11.8	8.2	8.1	8.2	7.8	7.8	4.5	3.2	3.2	2.0	2.8	2.9	2.9	2.8	2.6	2.8	2.7	2.5	2.5	2.4
Florida	10.9	9.9	8.9	8.9	7.3	7.4	7.2	7.0	7.3	8.2	8.1	7.8	7.3	7.1	6.3	5.5	5.1	4.6	4.4	4.5	4.2	4.1	4.0	4.0	3.9	3.6	3.6	3.5
Georgia	10.3	8.4	6.8	7.0	7.3	6.6	6.5			6.2	6.8	6.9	6.4	6.0	5.5	5.1	3.3	–	–	–	–	–	–	–	–	3.5	2.5	2.3
Hawaii	16.4	15.7	20.6	22.6	17.6	17.6	17.5	16.3	17.7	15.9	15.6	15.3	15.3	14.2	4.6	4.6	3.9	–	–	–	–	–	–	–	–	–	–	–
Idaho	13.9	13.1	10.8	10.5	8.8	8.6	8.2	8.2	8.4	8.2	8.1	7.8	7.8	7.4	6.5	5.8	5.5	5.0	5.2	4.9	4.7	4.5	4.2	4.1	4.0	3.9	3.8	3.9
Illinois	8.8	6.9	6.9	5.9	5.7	5.6	5.8	5.4	6.2	5.9	5.8	6.0	5.5	5.2	3.8	3.2	3.2	2.6	2.6	2.6	2.4	2.3	2.2	2.2	2.2	1.9	1.5	1.3
Indiana	9.6	8.6	7.9	6.9	6.3	6.8	6.7	6.6	7.1	6.9	6.9	6.9	6.6	6.2	–	–	–	–	–	–	–	–	–	–	–	–	–	–
Iowa	9.0	7.7	6.9	6.9	6.9	6.7	6.8	7.4	6.9	6.3	6.1	6.2	5.7	5.4	3.9	3.7	3.3	2.7	2.4	2.4	2.2	1.9	1.5	1.2	1.3	2.0	2.2	2.3
Kansas	9.2	8.5	8.3	6.8	6.4	6.3	6.3	6.0	6.1	5.9	6.2	6.0	5.4	5.3	5.0	4.1	3.6	3.1	3.7	3.9	3.4	3.0	3.0	2.8	2.7	2.4	2.3	2.3
Kentucky	13.5	12.2	9.8	8.7	7.4	7.5	7.2	7.3	6.9	7.2	7.4	7.2	6.8	6.3	5.8	5.9	5.1	4.6	4.5	4.4	4.1	4.2	3.8	3.7	3.8	3.7	3.5	3.4
Louisiana	9.6	9.3	9.1	8.0	6.9	6.4	5.7	6.4	6.9	6.8	6.1	5.6	5.1	5.1	–	–	–	–	–	–	–	2.2	2.3	2.8	2.0	1.9	1.7	2.4
Maine	9.7	8.7	8.8	8.2	7.1	7.2	7.3	8.3	7.7	7.6	7.6	7.6	7.4	7.1	4.3	4.4	5.0	4.1	4.2	4.2	3.9	4.0	3.6	3.4	3.4	3.2	3.2	3.0
Maryland	9.7	8.4	7.5	6.9	5.7	5.8	5.6	6.8	6.5	6.2	6.3	6.3	5.9	5.6	3.4	3.0	3.3	3.1	2.8	2.9	2.8	2.5	2.5	2.6	2.7	2.5	2.4	2.7
Massachusetts	7.9	7.1	5.8	6.2	5.6	5.5	5.5	5.5	5.6	5.5	5.8	5.7	6.3	5.0	2.8	2.2	2.5	2.2	2.5	2.7	2.7	2.6	2.7	2.6	2.3	2.2	2.1	1.5
Michigan	8.2	7.3	6.7	6.1	5.5	5.7	5.6	5.8	5.8	6.0	5.9	5.9	5.7	5.2	4.3	4.1	3.9	3.4	3.5	3.4	3.3	3.3	3.0	3.0	2.9	2.8	2.8	2.3
Minnesota	7.7	7.0	6.8	6.0	5.3	5.6	5.6	6.0	5.9	5.6	5.6	5.6	5.3	5.1	3.5	3.4	3.2	–	–	–	–	–	–	–	–	–	–	–
Mississippi	9.4	7.9	6.9	5.8	4.9	4.9	5.8	6.7	6.9	7.0	7.0	6.7	6.3	6.0	5.5	4.8	5.0	4.4	4.3	4.0	4.0	3.6	3.4	3.4	3.2	2.9	2.7	2.6
Missouri	9.6	8.3	7.8	7.0	6.5	6.6	6.5	6.4	6.7	6.8	6.9	6.6	6.5	6.0	5.1	5.0	4.5	3.6	3.9	3.9	3.7	3.4	3.3	3.2	3.3	3.1	3.0	2.9
Montana	8.6	7.6	7.3	7.4	7.4	7.8	7.8	7.4	7.9	8.0	7.8	8.0	7.7	7.9	5.1	4.8	4.2	4.5	3.9	4.0	3.9	3.4	3.4	3.4	3.1	3.1	3.0	3.0
Nebraska	8.0	7.3	7.6	7.0	6.6	6.6	6.7	6.3	6.4	6.4	6.5	6.3	6.0	5.5	4.0	3.8	3.7	3.3	3.6	3.5	3.4	3.3	3.1	3.2	3.1	3.0	2.9	2.7
Nevada	99.0	85.2	72.2	57.4	38.3	36.9	35.1	32.3	31.9	31.0	28.4	28.6	26.7	25.9	11.4	7.8	9.9	7.4	5.9	5.6	5.5	5.1	5.3	4.6	4.3	4.5	4.4	4.2
New Hampshire	9.5	8.3	9.4	7.3	7.3	7.1	6.8	6.9	7.2	6.9	7.0	7.0	6.9	6.6	4.7	4.2	4.8	3.9	3.8	3.8	3.6	3.7	3.5	3.3	3.4	3.1	3.1	3.1
New Jersey	7.6	6.5	6.0	5.7	5.1	4.8	4.9	5.1	5.4	5.6	5.7	5.5	5.4	5.2	3.0	3.0	3.0	2.9	3.0	2.9	2.8	2.8	2.8	2.8	2.7	2.6	2.7	2.5
New Mexico	8.8	8.8	8.0	6.6	7.7	8.0	6.9	7.3	8.1	6.2	6.4	5.9	6.4	6.0	4.9	6.6	5.1	4.6	4.0	3.3	3.0	3.4	3.6	3.3	–	–	–	–
New York	8.6	8.0	7.1	6.8	6.5	6.9	7.0	6.9	6.7	7.1	7.5	7.3	7.1	7.2	3.2	3.0	3.0	2.9	2.9	2.9	2.9	2.7	2.8	2.7	2.7	2.7	2.8	2.9
North Carolina	7.8	8.4	8.2	7.3	6.6	6.7	6.6	6.5	6.9	7.0	7.0	6.8	6.4	6.2	5.1	5.0	4.5	4.1	3.8	3.7	3.7	3.4	3.4	3.1	3.2	3.1	3.1	3.1
North Dakota	7.5	7.1	7.2	6.8	6.5	6.7	6.6	6.3	6.3	6.2	6.0	5.8	5.7	5.4	3.6	3.4	3.4	2.9	3.1	2.7	3.1	2.9	2.8	2.8	2.6	2.5	2.6	2.5
Ohio	9.0	8.0	7.8	6.5	5.8	5.9	5.8	5.7	5.8	5.9	6.0	5.8	5.6	5.3	4.7	4.3	4.2	3.5	3.4	3.4	3.4	3.3	3.2	3.1	3.0	2.9	2.9	2.8
Oklahoma	10.6	8.6		7.3	7.2	6.9	6.9	7.1	7.1	7.4	6.7	6.8	6.4	6.3	–	–	–	5.6	5.2	5.2	4.8	4.5	4.5	4.4	4.4	4.1	3.8	3.9
Oregon	8.9	8.1	7.6	7.3	6.5	6.6	6.6	6.3	6.8	6.9	6.9	6.7	6.3	6.0	5.5	4.7	4.8	4.2	4.0	3.8	3.8	3.6	3.4	3.4	3.4	3.4	3.4	3.2
Pennsylvania	7.1	6.2	6.0	5.8	5.3	5.3	5.5	5.4	5.8	5.7	5.8	5.7	5.5	5.4	3.3	3.2	3.1	2.3	2.7	2.8	2.8	2.7	2.7	2.6	2.6	2.6	2.6	2.6
Rhode Island	8.1	7.3	7.6	7.0	5.8	6.0	6.1	6.2	6.7	6.4	6.7	6.8	6.3	6.1	3.7	3.6	2.9	3.0	3.2	3.2	3.2	3.1	2.8	3.0	2.8	2.9	2.9	2.7
South Carolina	15.9	11.9	10.6	8.3	7.4	7.2	7.4	7.1	7.6	7.5	6.6	7.0	6.6	6.3	4.5	3.9	3.8	2.9	3.1	3.2	3.2	3.2	2.9	2.8	2.5	2.6	2.5	2.6
South Dakota	11.1	9.9	9.4	8.4	7.3	7.5	7.5	7.0	7.1	7.2	7.2	6.7	6.5	6.1	3.7	3.9	3.5	2.8	3.4	3.3	3.0	2.9	2.8	2.6	2.8	2.7	2.6	2.6
Tennessee	13.9	15.5	15.5	10.9	8.8	9.0	8.8	8.4	8.4	8.5	8.6	8.2	8.0	7.5	6.5	6.2	5.9	4.6	4.2	4.3	4.2	4.1	3.8	3.7	3.8	3.5	3.5	3.5
Texas	10.5	9.9	9.4	7.8	7.1	7.1	7.3	7.0	6.9	7.2	7.1	7.1	6.1	4.9	5.5	5.2	4.0	3.3	3.3	3.2	3.0	2.9	2.7	2.6	2.6	2.2	2.6	2.1
Utah	11.2	10.7	10.8	9.8	8.5	8.6	8.4	7.5	7.3	8.1	9.0	8.7	8.4	8.1	5.1	4.4	4.3	4.1	3.7	3.7	3.3	3.1	3.1	3.6	3.6	3.4	3.8	3.5
Vermont	10.9	10.3	10.0	8.9	9.3	8.3	8.2	9.2	8.7	8.1	8.3	7.9	7.9	7.7	4.5	4.7	4.1	3.6	3.8	3.6	3.5	3.5	3.5	3.1	3.1	2.9	3.1	2.8
Virginia	11.4	10.2	8.8	8.2	6.8	6.8	6.8	6.7	6.7	7.0	7.0	6.8	6.4	6.1	4.4	4.3	4.3	4.0	3.8	3.8	3.7	3.6	3.5	3.3	3.4	3.0	3.1	2.9
Washington	9.5	7.7	6.9	6.5	6.0	6.1	6.3	7.1	7.0	6.2	6.2	6.2	6.0	5.7	5.9	5.4	4.6	4.3	4.2	4.1	3.9	3.8	3.6	3.4	3.5	3.4	3.3	2.8
West Virginia	7.2	6.1	8.7	7.4	6.7	7.2	7.0	6.6	6.7	6.6	6.4	6.3	6.1	6.0	5.3	5.2	5.1	5.1	5.1	5.2	4.7	4.6	4.2	4.0	3.8	3.5	3.3	3.6
Wisconsin	7.9	7.0	6.7	6.1	5.3	5.3	5.4	5.2	5.7	5.6	5.6	5.6	5.4	5.0	3.6	3.4	3.2	2.9	3.0	2.9	2.9	2.8	2.7	2.6	2.6	2.4	2.5	2.3
Wyoming	10.7	10.6	10.0	9.3	7.6	7.8	7.6	7.5	7.7	7.3	7.1	7.1	7.1	7.0	6.6	6.6	5.8	5.2	5.1	4.8	4.4	4.3	4.6	4.1	4.2	4.0	3.8	3.8

^{1} Includes annulments. Includes divorce petitions filed or legal separations for some counties or States.
^{2} Marriage data includes nonlicensed marriages registered.

=== Financial impact of divorce ===
The family income of children whose parents divorce and remain divorced for at least six years falls by 40 to 45 percent.

== See also ==
- Marriage in the United States
- Family structure in the United States
- Divorce demography
- Divorce of same-sex couples
- Divorce party
- Emancipation of minors
- Fear of commitment
- Effects of divorce
- Legal separation
- Men's rights movement
- Relationship counseling
- Religion and divorce
