= Pot Kettle Black =

Pot Kettle Black may refer to:

- The phrase The pot calling the kettle black
- A song on the Wilco album Yankee Hotel Foxtrot
