= Mexican divorce =

Easy termination of marriage done in Mexico

In the mid-20th century, some Americans traveled to Mexico to obtain a "Mexican divorce". A divorce in Mexico was easier, quicker, and less expensive than a divorce in most U.S. states, which then only allowed at-fault divorces requiring extensive proof and lengthy court review. Celebrities who obtained a Mexican divorce include Elizabeth Montgomery, Johnny Carson, Katharine Hepburn, Richard Burton, William S. Burroughs, Elizabeth Taylor, Marilyn Monroe, Don Hewitt, Helen Kane, Marcia Clark, Charlie Chaplin, Jayne Mansfield, Stanley Kubrick, Jill St. John and Tom T. Chamales.

It was often referred to as a quickie (sometimes spelled quicky) Mexican divorce.

== Historical context ==
Mexico does not require spouses to be present at a divorce hearing; they can send a lawyer to represent them. This "fast-track" process is in contrast to American divorce procedures, which involve additional bureaucracy and added expense.

A state in the United States is not required to recognize the validity of a Mexican divorce obtained by one of the state's residents, because the Full Faith and Credit Clause of the United States Constitution does not apply to foreign judgments. The State of New York is the only state that recognizes the validity of a Mexican divorce obtained by a New York resident, so long as the divorce is bilateral (i.e. both parties appeared in the proceeding).

In 1970, in accordance with a Mexican federal law recommendation, many courts stopped accepting divorce petitions from non-residents. In the period between 1970 and 2010, every state in the US passed legislation allowing no-fault divorce, so Mexican divorces are no longer necessary.

== In popular culture ==
The Mexican divorce is mentioned in the Jack Kerouac book On the Road.

"Mexican Divorce" is the title of a 1961 song by Burt Bacharach and Bob Hilliard, which was issued as single in 1962 by The Drifters. It is also the song where Bacharach first met Dionne Warwick, one of the background singers, for whom he would later write numerous top hits. The song would be remade by Ry Cooder on his 1974 album Paradise and Lunch and by Nicolette Larson on her 1978 album Nicolette. Mexican divorce is also referenced in the song "What Do You Want from Life?" by The Tubes and in the Tom Waits song "The Part You Throw Away".

References to a Mexican divorce are also made in the 1952 episode "The Gossip" in I Love Lucy (season 1, episode 24) and the 1963 episode "Up in Barney's Room" of The Andy Griffith Show (season 4, episode 10). Mexican divorces were also plot twists in several episodes of the legal drama Perry Mason.

A Mexican divorce and a subsequent marriage are the central plot device in the 1965 movie Marriage on the Rocks. The Mexican Government disliked the film's depiction of Mexico and banned the movie, and other Sinatra films, for presenting the country in a negative light.

== See also ==
- Divorce in the United States
- Divorce mill
