= Whataboutism =

Informal fallacy and propaganda strategy

- Tactic: Manipulation and propaganda strategy
- Type: Tu quoque (appeal to hypocrisy, ad hominem) and red herring (distraction from relevant topic of discussion)
- Logic: Informal fallacy

"Whataboutism" or "whataboutery" (as in, "but what about X?") refers to the propaganda strategy of responding to an accusation with a counter-accusation instead of offering an explanation or defense against the original accusation. It is an informal fallacy that the accused party uses to avoid accountability—whether attempting to distract by shifting the conversation's focus away from their behaviour or attempting to justify themselves by pointing to the similar behaviour (which may be true or false, but irrelevant) of their opponent or another party who is not the current subject of discussion.

From a logical and argumentative point of view, whataboutism is a variant of the "tu quoque" pattern, a subtype of the ad hominem style of argument.

The intent is often to distract from the topic's content (red herring). The goal may also be to question the justification for criticism and the critic's legitimacy, integrity, and fairness, which can discredit the criticism whether or not it is justified. Common accusations include double standards and hypocrisy, but it can also be used to relativize criticism of one's own viewpoints or behaviors (A: "Long-term unemployment often means poverty in Germany." B: "And what about the starving in Africa and Asia?"). Related manipulation and propaganda techniques that involve rhetorical evasion of the topic include changing topic and false balance (also called "bothsidesism").

Some commentators have defended the usage of whataboutism and tu quoque in certain contexts. Whataboutism can provide necessary context into whether or not a particular line of critique is relevant or fair, and behavior that may be imperfect by international standards may be appropriate in a given geopolitical neighbourhood. Accusing an interlocutor of whataboutism can also in itself be manipulative and serve the motive of discrediting, as critical talking points can be used selectively and purposefully even as the starting point of the conversation (cf. agenda setting, framing, framing effect, priming, cherry picking). The deviation from them can then be branded as whataboutism. Both whataboutism and the accusation of it are forms of strategic framing and have a framing effect.

== Etymology ==
The term whataboutism is a compound of what and about, is synonymous with whataboutery, and means to twist criticism back on the initial critic.

== Origins ==
According to lexicographer Ben Zimmer, the term originated in Northern Ireland in the 1970s. Zimmer cites a 1974 letter by history teacher Sean O'Conaill which was published in The Irish Times where he complained about "the Whatabouts", people who defended the IRA by pointing out supposed wrongdoings of their enemy:

I would not suggest such a thing were it not for the Whatabouts. These are the people who answer every condemnation of the Provisional I.R.A. with an argument to prove the greater immorality of the "enemy", and therefore the justice of the Provisionals' cause: "What about Bloody Sunday, internment, torture, force-feeding, army intimidation?". Every call to stop is answered in the same way: "What about the Treaty of Limerick; the Anglo-Irish treaty of 1921; Lenadoon?". Neither is the Church immune: "The Catholic Church has never supported the national cause. What about Papal sanction for the Norman invasion; condemnation of the Fenians by Moriarty; Parnell?"

— Sean O'Conaill, "Letter to Editor", The Irish Times, 30 Jan 1974

Three days later, an opinion column by John Healy in the same paper entitled "Enter the cultural British Army" picked up the theme by using the term whataboutery: "As a correspondent noted in a recent letter to this paper, we are very big on Whatabout Morality, matching one historic injustice with another justified injustice. We have a bellyfull [sic] of Whataboutery in these killing days and the one clear fact to emerge is that people, Orange and Green, are dying as a result of it." Zimmer says the term gained wide currency in commentary about the conflict between unionists and nationalists in Northern Ireland. Zimmer also notes that the variant whataboutism was used in the same context in a 1993 book by Tony Parker.

In 1978, Australian journalist Michael Barnard wrote a column in The Age applying the term whataboutism to the Soviet Union's tactics of deflecting any criticism of its human rights abuses. Merriam-Webster details that "the association of whataboutism with the Soviet Union began during the Cold War. As the regimes of [Joseph] Stalin and his successors were criticized by the West for human rights atrocities, the Soviet propaganda machine would be ready with a comeback alleging atrocities of equal reprehensibility for which the West was guilty."

Zimmer credits British journalist Edward Lucas for beginning regular use of the word whataboutism in the modern era following its appearance in a blog post on 29 October 2007, reporting as part of a diary about Russia which was re-printed in the 2 November issue of The Economist. On 31 January 2008 The Economist printed another article by Lucas titled "Whataboutism". Ivan Tsvetkov, associate professor of International Relations in St Petersburg also credits Lucas for modern uses of the term.

== Analysis ==
=== Psychological motivations ===
The philosopher Merold Westphal said that only people who know themselves to be guilty of something "can find comfort in finding others to be just as bad or worse." Whataboutery, as practiced by both parties in The Troubles in Northern Ireland to highlight what the other side had done to them, was "one of the commonest forms of evasion of personal moral responsibility," according to Bishop (later Cardinal) Cahal Daly. After a political shooting at a baseball game in 2017, journalist Chuck Todd criticized the tenor of political debate, commenting, "What-about-ism is among the worst instincts of partisans on both sides."

=== Intentionally discrediting oneself ===
Whataboutism usually points the finger at a rival's offenses to discredit them, but, in a reversal of this usual direction, it can also be used to discredit oneself while one refuses to critique an ally. During the 2016 U.S. presidential campaign, when The New York Times asked candidate Donald Trump about Turkish President Recep Tayyip Erdoğan's treatment of journalists, teachers, and dissidents, Trump replied with a criticism of U.S. history on civil liberties. Writing for The Diplomat, Catherine Putz pointed out: "The core problem is that this rhetorical device precludes discussion of issues (e.g. civil rights) by one country (e.g. the United States) if that state lacks a perfect record." Masha Gessen wrote for The New York Times that usage of the tactic by Trump was shocking to Americans, commenting, "No American politician in living memory has advanced the idea that the entire world, including the United States, was rotten to the core."

=== Concerns about effects ===
Joe Austin was critical of the practice of whataboutism in Northern Ireland in a 1994 piece, The Obdurate and the Obstinate, writing: "And I'd no time at all for 'What aboutism' ... if you got into it you were defending the indefensible." In 2017, The New Yorker described the tactic as "a strategy of false moral equivalences", and Clarence Page called the technique "a form of logical jiu-jitsu". Writing for National Review, commentator Ben Shapiro criticized the practice, whether it was used by those espousing right-wing or left-wing politics; Shapiro concluded: "It's all dumb. And it's making us all dumber." Michael J. Koplow of Israel Policy Forum wrote that the usage of whataboutism had become a crisis; concluding that the tactic did not yield any benefits, Koplow charged that "whataboutism from either the right or the left only leads to a black hole of angry recriminations from which nothing will escape".

== Defense ==
=== Contextualization ===
Some commentators have defended the usage of whataboutism and tu quoque in certain contexts. Whataboutism can provide necessary context into whether or not a particular line of critique is relevant or fair. In international relations, behavior that may be imperfect by international standards may be quite good for a given geopolitical neighborhood and deserves to be recognized as such.

=== Distorted self-perception ===
Christian Christensen, Professor of Journalism in Stockholm, argues that the accusation of whataboutism is itself a form of the tu quoque fallacy, as it dismisses criticisms of one's own behavior to focus instead on the actions of another, thus creating a double standard. Those who use whataboutism are not necessarily engaging in an empty or cynical deflection of responsibility: whataboutism can be a useful tool to expose contradictions, double standards, and hypocrisy. For example, one's opponent's action appears as forbidden torture, one's own actions as "enhanced interrogation methods", the other's violence as aggression, one's own merely as a reaction. Christensen even sees utility in the use of the argument: "The so-called 'whataboutists' question what has not been questioned before and bring contradictions, double standards, and hypocrisy to light. This is not naïve justification or rationalization [...], it is a challenge to think critically about the (sometimes painful) truth of our position in the world."

=== Lack of sincerity ===
In his analysis of Whataboutism, logic professor Axel Barceló of the UNAM concludes that the counteraccusation often expresses a justified suspicion that the criticism does not correspond to the critic's real position and reasons.

Abe Greenwald pointed out that even the first accusation leading to the counteraccusation is an arbitrary setting, which can be just as one-sided and biased, or even more one-sided than the counter-question "what about?" Thus, whataboutism could also be enlightening and put the first accusation in perspective.

=== Idealization ===
In her analysis of whataboutism in the 2016 United States presidential election, Catherine Putz notes in 2016 in The Diplomat Magazine that the core problem is that this rhetorical device precludes discussion of a country's contentious issues (e.g., civil rights on the part of the United States) if that country is not perfect in that area. It requires, by default, that a country be allowed to make a case to other countries only for those ideals in which it had achieved the highest level of perfection. The problem with ideals, she said, is that we rarely achieve them as human beings. But the ideals remain important, she said, and the United States should continue to advocate for them: "It is the message that is important, not the ambassador."

=== Protective mechanism ===
Gina Schad sees the characterization of counterarguments as "whataboutism" as a lack of communicative competence, insofar as discussions are cut off by this accusation. The accusation of others of whataboutism is also used as an ideological protective mechanism that leads to "closures and echo chambers". The reference to "whataboutism" is also perceived as a "discussion stopper" "to secure a certain hegemony of discourse and interpretation."

=== Deflection ===
A number of commentators, among them Forbes columnist Mark Adomanis, have criticized the usage of accusations of whataboutism by American news outlets, arguing that accusations of whataboutism have been used to simply deflect criticisms of human rights abuses perpetrated by the United States or its allies. Vincent Bevins and Alex Lo argue that the usage of the term almost exclusively by American outlets is a double standard, and that moral accusations made by powerful countries are merely a pretext to punish their geopolitical rivals in the face of their own wrongdoing.

Left-wing academics Kristen Ghodsee and Scott Sehon argue that mentioning the possible existence of victims of capitalism in popular discourse is often dismissed as "whataboutism", which they describe as "a term implying that only atrocities perpetrated by communists merit attention." They also argue that such accusations of "whataboutism" are invalid as the same arguments used against communism can also be used against capitalism.

Scholars Ivan Franceschini and Nicholas Loubere argue it is not whataboutism to document and denounce authoritarianism in different countries, and noted global parallels such as the role Islamophobia played in China's Xinjiang re-education camps and the US's War on terror and travel bans targeting Muslim countries, as well as influence of corporations and other international actors in the documented abuses which is becoming more obscured. Franceschini and Loubere conclude that authoritarianism "must be opposed everywhere", and that "only by finding the critical parallels, linkages, and complicities can we develop immunity to the virus of whataboutism and avoid its essentialist hyperactive immune response, achieving the moral consistency and holistic perspective that we need in order to build up international solidarity and stop sleepwalking towards the abyss."

== In proverbs and similes ==
Jesus' statement, "Let he who is without fault cast the first stone" (John 8:7), the similar parable of the beam in the eye (Matthew 7:3) and proverbs based on it such as "He who sits in a glass house should not throw stones" are sometimes compared to whataboutism. Nigel Warburton sees the difference in the fact that the point of view in the Bible and in Proverbs is different from that in politics. Jesus is in the right to remind the sinner of his own guilt, because he himself has no guilt, he is on the side of good. Although a wrongdoer can sometimes be in the right by pointing out an actual shortcoming, this does not change the difference in principle.

The whataboutery move seems to rest on the false assumption that wrongdoing is mitigated if others have done something similar, and the feeling that accusers need to be innocent of the crime of which they are accusing others. 'You think I'm doing something terrible, so look around you at all the others doing much the same as me. What is more, you don't have a credible position from which to attack me.' At best that is just self-serving rationalisation, but as a tactical move it can work.

== Use in political contexts ==
=== Soviet Union and Russia ===
Although the term whataboutism spread recently, Edward Lucas's 2008 Economist article states that "Soviet propagandists during the cold war were trained in a tactic that their western interlocutors nicknamed 'whataboutism'. Any criticism of the Soviet Union (Afghanistan, martial law in Poland, imprisonment of dissidents, censorship) was met with a 'What about...' (apartheid South Africa, jailed trade-unionists, the Contras in Nicaragua, and so forth)." Lucas recommended two methods of properly countering whataboutism: to "use points made by Russian leaders themselves" so that they cannot be applied to the West, and for Western nations to engage in more self-criticism of their own media and government. In his book The New Cold War: Putin's Russia and the Threat to the West (2008), Edward Lucas characterized whataboutism as "the favourite weapon of Soviet propagandists".

Following the publication of Lucas's 2007 and 2008 articles and his book, opinion writers at prominent English language media outlets began using the term and echoing the themes laid out by Lucas, including the association with the Soviet Union and Russia. Journalist Luke Harding described Russian whataboutism as "practically a national ideology". Juhan Kivirähk and colleagues called it a "polittechnological" strategy.

Writing in The National Interest in 2013, Samuel Charap was critical of the tactic, commenting, "Russian policy makers, meanwhile, gain little from petulant bouts of 'whataboutism'". National security journalist Julia Ioffe commented in a 2014 article, "Anyone who has ever studied the Soviet Union knows about a phenomenon called 'whataboutism'." Ioffe said that Russia Today was "an institution that is dedicated solely to the task of whataboutism", and concluded that whataboutism was a "sacred Russian tactic". Garry Kasparov discussed the Soviet tactic in his 2015 book Winter Is Coming, calling it a form of "Soviet propaganda" and a way for Russian bureaucrats to "respond to criticism of Soviet massacres, forced deportations, and gulags". Mark Adomanis commented for The Moscow Times in 2015 that "Whataboutism was employed by the Communist Party with such frequency and shamelessness that a sort of pseudo mythology grew up around it." Adomanis observed, "Any student of Soviet history will recognize parts of the whataboutist canon."

Writing in 2016 for Bloomberg News, journalist Leonid Bershidsky called whataboutism a "Russian tradition", while The National called the tactic "an effective rhetorical weapon". In their book The European Union and Russia (2016), Forsberg and Haukkala characterized whataboutism as an "old Soviet practice", and they observed that the strategy "has been gaining in prominence in the Russian attempts at deflecting Western criticism". In her 2016 book, Security Threats and Public Perception, author Elizaveta Gaufman called the whataboutism technique "A Soviet/Russian spin on liberal anti-Americanism", comparing it to the Soviet rejoinder, "And you are lynching negroes". Foreign Policy supported this assessment. Daphne Skillen discussed the tactic in her 2016 book, Freedom of Speech in Russia, identifying it as a "Soviet propagandist's technique" and "a common Soviet-era defence". Writing for Bloomberg News, Leonid Bershidsky called whataboutism a "Russian tradition", while The New Yorker described the technique as "a strategy of false moral equivalences".

In a piece for CNN, Jill Dougherty compared the technique to the pot calling the kettle black. Dougherty wrote: "There's another attitude ... that many Russians seem to share, what used to be called in the Soviet Union 'whataboutism', in other words, 'who are you to call the kettle black?'" Julia Ioffe called whataboutism a "sacred Russian tactic", and also compared it to accusing the pot calling the kettle black.

Russian journalist Alexey Kovalev told GlobalPost in 2017 that the tactic was "an old Soviet trick". Peter Conradi, author of Who Lost Russia?, called whataboutism "a form of moral relativism that responds to criticism with the simple response: 'But you do it too'". Conradi echoed Gaufman's comparison of the tactic to the Soviet response, "Over there they lynch Negroes". In 2017, journalist Melik Kaylan explained the term's increased pervasiveness in referring to Russian propaganda tactics: "Kremlinologists of recent years call this 'whataboutism' because the Kremlin's various mouthpieces deployed the technique so exhaustively against the U.S." Kaylan commented upon a "suspicious similarity between Kremlin propaganda and Trump propaganda". Foreign Policy wrote that Russian whataboutism was "part of the national psyche". Eurasianet stated that "Moscow's geopolitical whataboutism skills are unmatched", while Paste correlated whataboutism's rise with the increasing societal consumption of fake news.

==== Notable examples ====
Several articles connected whataboutism to the Soviet era by pointing to the "And you are lynching Negroes" example (as Lucas did) of the 1930s, in which the Soviets deflected any criticism by referencing racism in the segregated American South. The tactic was extensively used even after the racial segregation in the South was outlawed in the 1950s and 1960s. Ioffe, who has written about whataboutism in at least three separate outlets, called it a "classic" example of whataboutism, citing the Soviet response to criticism as a "classic" form of whataboutism.

The Soviet government engaged in a major cover-up of the Chernobyl nuclear disaster in 1986. When they finally acknowledged the disaster, although without any details, the Telegraph Agency of the Soviet Union (TASS) then discussed the Three Mile Island accident and other American nuclear accidents, which Serge Schmemann of The New York Times wrote was an example of the common Soviet tactic of whataboutism. The mention of a commission also indicated to observers the seriousness of the incident, and subsequent state radio broadcasts were replaced with classical music, which was a common method of preparing the public for an announcement of a tragedy in the USSR.

In 2016, Canadian columnist Terry Glavin asserted in the Ottawa Citizen that Noam Chomsky used the tactic in an October 2001 speech, delivered after the September 11 attacks, that was critical of US foreign policy. In 2006, Putin replied to George W. Bush's criticism of Russia's human rights record by stating that he "did not want to head a democracy like Iraq's," referencing the US intervention in Iraq.

Some writers also identified examples in 2012 when Russian officials responded to critique by, for example, redirecting attention to the United Kingdom's anti-protest laws or Russians' difficulty obtaining a visa to the United Kingdom.

The term receives increased attention when controversies involving Russia are in the news. For example, writing for Slate in 2014, Joshua Keating noted the use of "whataboutism" in a statement on Russia's 2014 annexation of Crimea, where Putin "listed a litany of complaints about Western intervention."

In 2017, Ben Zimmer noted that Putin also used the tactic in an interview with NBC News journalist Megyn Kelly.

==== Russophobia allegation ====
The practice of labelling whataboutism as typically Russian or Soviet is sometimes rejected as russophobic. Glenn Diesen sees this usage as an attempt to delegitimize Russian politics. As early as 1985, Ronald Reagan had introduced the construct of "false ethical balance" to "denounce" any attempt at comparison between the US and other countries. Jeane Kirkpatrick, in her essay The Myth of Moral Equivalence (1986) saw the Soviet Union's whataboutism as an attempt to use moral reasoning to present themselves as a legitimate superpower on an equal footing with the United States. The comparison was inadmissible in principle, since there was only one legitimate superpower, the USA, and it did not stand up for power interests but for values. Glenn Diesen sees this as a framing of American politics, with the aim of defining the relationship of countries to each other analogously to a teacher-pupil relationship, whereby in the political framework the USA is the teacher. Kirkpatrick invoked Harold Lasswell's understanding of the enforcement of an ideological framework using political dominance to analyze the semantic manipulations of the Soviet Union. According to Lasswell, every country tries to impose its interpretive framework on others, even by the means of revolution and war. For Kirkpatrick, however, these interpretive frameworks of different states are not equivalent.

=== China ===
A synonymous Chinese-language metaphor is the "stinky bug argument" (traditional Chinese: 臭蟲論; simplified Chinese: 臭虫论; pinyin: Chòuchónglùn), coined by Lu Xun, a leading figure in modern Chinese literature, in 1933 to describe his Chinese colleagues' common tendency to accuse Europeans of "having equally bad issues" whenever foreigners commented upon China's domestic problems. As a Chinese nationalist, Lu saw this mentality as one of the biggest obstructions to the modernization of China in the early 20th century, which Lu frequently mocked in his literary works.

In response to tweets from Donald Trump's administration criticizing the Chinese government's mistreatment of ethnic minorities and the pro-democracy protests in Hong Kong, Chinese Foreign Ministry officials began using Twitter to point out racial inequalities and social unrest in the United States which led Politico to accuse China of engaging in whataboutism.

=== Donald Trump ===
After receiving a question about the alt-right, president Trump replies "What about the alt-left?"

Writing for The Washington Post, former United States Ambassador to Russia, Michael McFaul wrote critically of Trump's use of the tactic and compared him to Putin. Referring to a statement by Trump in 2015, when asked about the killing of journalists under Putin, that "our country does plenty of killing also," McFaul commented, "That's exactly the kind of argument that Russian propagandists have used for years to justify some of Putin's most brutal policies." Los Angeles Times contributor Matt Welch classed the tactic among "six categories of Trump apologetics". Mother Jones called the tactic "a traditional Russian propaganda strategy", and observed, "The whataboutism strategy has made a comeback and evolved in President Vladimir Putin's Russia."

In early 2017, amid coverage of interference in the 2016 election and the lead up to the Mueller Investigation into Donald Trump, several people, including Edward Lucas, wrote opinion pieces associating whataboutism with both Trump and Russia. "Instead of giving a reasoned defense [of his health care plan], he went for blunt offense, which is a hallmark of whataboutism", wrote Danielle Kurtzleben of NPR, adding that he "sounds an awful lot like Putin."

When, in a widely viewed television interview that aired before the Super Bowl in 2017, Fox News host Bill O'Reilly called Putin a "killer", Trump responded by saying that the US government was also guilty of killing people. He responded, "There are a lot of killers. We've got a lot of killers. What do you think — our country's so innocent?" This episode prompted commentators to accuse Trump of whataboutism, including Chuck Todd on the television show Meet the Press and political advisor Jake Sullivan.

=== Use by other states ===
==== Europe ====
The term "whataboutery" has been used by Loyalists and Republicans since the period of the Troubles in Northern Ireland.

==== Asia ====
The tactic was employed by Azerbaijan, which responded to criticism of its human rights record by holding parliamentary hearings on issues in the United States. Simultaneously, pro-Azerbaijan Internet trolls used whataboutism to draw attention away from criticism of the country.

The Turkish government engaged in whataboutism by publishing an official document listing criticisms of other governments that had criticized Turkey for its dramatic purge of state institutions and civil society in the wake of a failed coup attempt in July of that year.

The tactic was also employed by Saudi Arabia and Israel. In 2018, Israeli Prime Minister Benjamin Netanyahu said that "the [Israeli] occupation is nonsense, there are plenty of big countries that occupied and replaced populations and no one talks about them." In July 2022, the Crown Prince of Saudi Arabia Mohammad bin Salman engaged in this tactic by raising the killing of Palestinian-American journalist Shireen Abu Akleh, and the torture and abuse of Iraqi prisoners by US soldiers during the Iraq War, after US President Joe Biden raised the killing of Saudi journalist Jamal Khashoggi at the Saudi consulate in Istanbul on 2 October 2018 by agents of the Saudi government, during a conversation with Mohammed as part of Biden's state visit to Saudi Arabia.

Iran's foreign minister Mohammad Javad Zarif used the tactic in the Zurich Security Conference on February 17, 2019. When pressed by BBC's Lyse Doucet about eight environmentalists imprisoned in his country, he mentioned the killing of Jamal Khashoggi. Doucet picked up the fallacy and said "let's leave that aside."

The Indian prime minister Narendra Modi has been accused of using whataboutism, especially in regard to the 2015 Indian writers protest and the nomination of former Chief Justice Ranjan Gogoi to parliament.

== See also ==
- Ad hominem
- Antanagoge
- Character assassination
- Clean hands
- DARVO ("Deny, Attack, Reverse Victim and Offender")
- Discrediting tactic
- Fallacy of relative privation
- False equivalence
- Genetic fallacy
- Physician, heal thyself
- Poisoning the well
- Psychological projection
- Race card
- Russian political jokes
- Selection bias
- Tankie
- The Mote and the Beam
- Two wrongs don't make a right
- Victor's justice
