= Grounds for divorce (United States) =

Legal regulations

Grounds for divorce are regulations specifying the circumstances under which a person will be granted a divorce. Each state in the United States has its own set of grounds. A person must state the reason they want a divorce at a divorce trial and be able to prove that this reason is well-founded. Several states require that the couple must live apart for several months before being granted a divorce. However, living apart is not accepted as grounds for a divorce in many states.

In the United States married couples are allowed to end a marriage by filing for a divorce on the grounds of either fault or no fault. In the past, most states only granted divorces on fault grounds, but today all states have adopted the no fault divorce. Fault and no-fault divorces each require that specific grounds be met. A no fault divorce can be granted on grounds such as irretrievable breakdown of the marriage, irreconcilable differences, incompatibility, or after a period of separation, depending on the state. Neither party is held responsible for the failure of the marriage. On the other hand, in fault divorces one party is asking for a divorce because they claim the other party did something wrong that justifies ending the marriage. Several grounds for fault divorce include adultery, cruelty, abandonment, mental illness, and criminal conviction. There are, however, additional grounds that are acceptable in some states such as drug abuse, impotency, and religious reasons.

While there are various grounds for divorce across the United States, there are also defenses that can be raised in response to many divorce claims. These defenses include insufficiency of evidence that the spouse in fact engaged in the conduct cited (or, more strongly, the presence of affirmative evidence to the contrary), acceptance of the alleged conduct at the time when it was engaged in ("condonation"), the complaining party's having engaged in similar conduct of his/her own ("recrimination"), and absence of or insufficiency of evidence proving other conditions invoked as grounds (e.g., insufficient length of separation or presence of a chance of reconciliation).

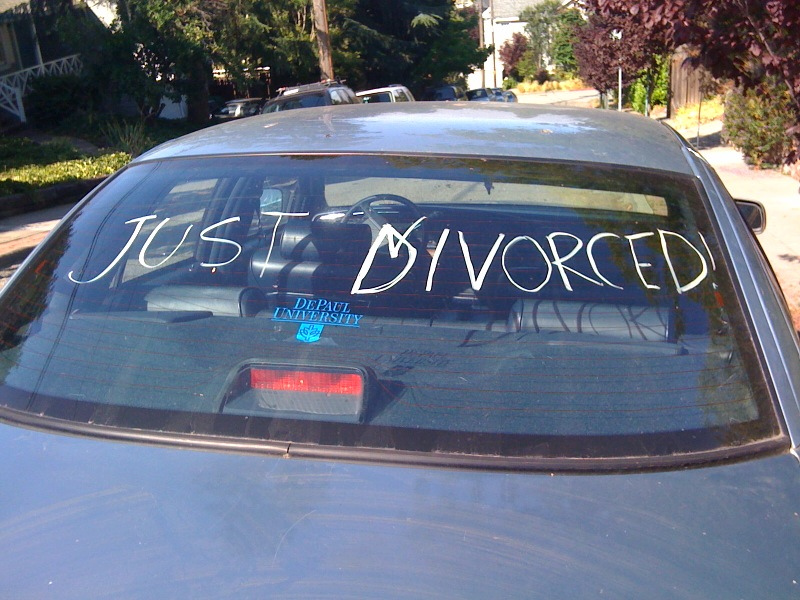
Rear window of a car. Oakland, CA. July 2010.

== History ==
Divorce laws have changed a great deal over the last few centuries. Many of the grounds for divorce available in the United States today are rooted in the policies instated by early British rule. Following the American Colonies' independence, each settlement generally determined its own acceptable grounds for divorce. During colonial times, grounds for divorce were more limited in scope, both in terms of which grievances could qualify as grounds and in terms of who was able to use them. In the 18th century, such concerns as infidelity, alcohol abuse, mistreatment, abandonment, and impotence were among the few reasons that could qualify as grounds for divorce. For much of America's history, wealthy men were the people most able to seek and to receive a desired split. By the 1960s, however, women and citizens of fewer means found the conditions for seeking divorce more accessible. At this time, the law required that one partner be at-fault in order for the couple to pursue the termination of their marriage. This constraint arose out of the desire to ensure that all of the basis for divorce be adequate. Prior to this, people used such issues as incompatibility or a decline in lucidity as grounds; the court eventually came to see these problems as not severe enough to warrant divorce, however. In the 1970s, no-fault grounds gained favor in many states, and in 2010, New York became one of the last of the fifty states to allow no-fault divorces even in cases where there was no mutual consent to the divorce. The other states still requiring mutual consent for no-fault divorce are Tennessee (except where there are no minor children and the couple have lived apart for two years), Mississippi, and South Dakota.

== No-fault divorce ==
Every state in the United States allows the acquisition of no-fault divorce. When the marriage partners mutually agree that they no longer feel the marriage is worth continuing, a no-fault divorce will allow the couple to obtain a divorce easily. In order to obtain a no-fault divorce in only Tennessee, Mississippi, and South Dakota, the parties must mutually consent to provide information regarding incompatibility or why the marriage partners have changed, grown apart, or have irreconcilable differences. Otherwise, in the rest of the country, only one party has to file for irreconcilable differences, and any excuse will do. If a state requires a separation period, either or both spouses may be required to bring a witness to testify that the parties have been living apart for the required amount of time.

=== History ===
In 1969-1970, California became the first state to pass a purely no-fault divorce law, i.e., one which did not offer any fault divorce grounds. It terminated all fault grounds for divorce, and used single no-fault standards making divorce easier and less costly. During the next 15, years no-fault divorce became more common in various states throughout the United States. Some states offer both fault and no-fault options. However, the states that do not carry both options have only the one option of no-fault grounds.

=== Separation ===
Marriage partners who are living apart have grounds for no-fault divorce. Like Louisiana, various states have statutes requiring the parties to live apart from one another for a certain period of time. The reason the time limitation exists is to see if the couple can reconcile. For example, differing from Louisiana, Pennsylvania state law does not permit legal separation. Different states have different time periods of separation as grounds for divorce:

Length of separation as grounds for divorce
State	Time period	Ref
California	6 months	
Texas	3 years	
Florida	None	
New York	1 year	
Illinois	6 months	
Georgia	30 days	
North Carolina	1 year	
Virginia	1 year (6 months if no children)	
Maryland	6 months	
Missouri	30 days	

=== Irretrievable breakdown ===
In the United States, many states allow spouses to divorce if they are no longer willing to live with one another. However, some states use different terminologies for a marriage that breaks down. The cause of the breakdown is legally termed as "irreconcilable differences" or "incompatible of temperament." This breakdown occurs through no fault of the spouses, without blame to one another, and commonly represents grounds for divorce. Regardless of the terminology used, all states allow parties to divorce if the marriage breaks down and the couple agrees that the marriage will not work. In order to attain a divorce on grounds that the marriage is over, the couple is required to prepare an affidavit that the marriage is irreparably broken and sign it under oath. An alternative to a sworn statement is to agree in writing that the marriage is broken beyond repair.

=== State acceptance ===
Every state within the United States accepts the no-fault divorce. This option is more common than a fault divorce as it can be more convenient and less expensive. Many believe that a no-fault divorce also causes less strain on a family with children than a fault divorce. By law, one member from the party must acknowledge that the marriage is beyond repair.

== Advantages and disadvantages ==
Multiple surveys have been given to the American people requesting their opinions regarding no-fault divorce. The surveys revealed that 50% of Americans are disappointed with no-fault divorce and would like alterations to the system to make no-fault divorce more difficult. A no-fault divorce is much easier to obtain than a fault divorce. They save time and money plus neither party has to provide evidence. A no-fault divorce also allows the divorcing parties to have privacy, which can allow them to work with each other during the difficult time.

Even though a fault divorce is more time-consuming, and could even be more likely to violate the parties' privacy, a fault divorce might need to be considered. For example, when the party is going through a fault divorce trial the husband/wife might be convicted of being an unfit parent, which will require evidence so the spouse can be found guilty of abuse.

== Fault divorce ==
A fault divorce is a divorce which is granted after the party asking for the divorce sufficiently proves that the other party did something wrong that justifies ending the marriage. For example, in Texas, grounds for an "at-fault" divorce include cruelty, adultery, a felony conviction, abandonment, living apart, and commitment in a mental institution. The party filing for the divorce must prove that the other party has done something to justify ending the union. Different states have different requirements for obtaining a fault divorce but in each state the spouse filing for the divorce is required to establish a reason for the divorce and provide evidence of the other party’s guilt. The specific grounds for receiving a fault divorce include adultery, impotency, infertility or homosexuality (for heterosexual married couples) of the other party that was not discussed before the union; criminal conviction of a felony or imprisonment of one party for a certain length of time; abandonment or desertion, cruelty, or mental instability of one of the parties.

Divorce courts require proof be given that the grounds actually exist. This can be accomplished by providing testimony from a hired detective with documentation of the spouse's bad behavior or from someone who witnessed or has first-hand knowledge of the spouse's bad behavior. There are defenses a spouse can use to convince the court that he or she is not at fault in order to have the grounds dismissed and possibly prevent a fault divorce. These defenses include collusion, condonation, connivance, and provocation.

Fault divorces are becoming less common today because every state now recognizes no-fault divorces. No-fault divorces are more common since no proof of fault is required. They are not as costly, can be completed faster, and can be less stressful on the family members. However, fault divorces are advantageous if a quick divorce is desirable. This type of divorce is granted quickly without the waiting period of no-fault divorces where parties are ordered to live apart for a specific amount of time before the divorce is finalized. Another benefit of a fault divorce is the monetary gain. Proof of the accused party's wrongdoing may result in the court granting the filing spouse a larger portion of the marital property or increased support and alimony. However, fault divorces are considerably more expensive to obtain than no-fault divorces.

The most common fault grounds include the following:

=== Adultery ===
Sexual activities with a person differing from your spouse constitute adultery. In order to use adultery as grounds for a divorce, the filing party must present sufficient proof that the other party had sexual relations with a third party. Circumstantial as well as documented evidence, including videotapes of the spouse committing the sexual infidelity, can be used as proof of adultery. In addition to this evidence, the accusing partner must prove that the other partner had the opportunity and inclination to commit adultery.

=== Cruelty ===
Proof of cruelty or the repeated infliction of serious physical or mental suffering by one marital partner on the other is also grounds for divorce. To obtain a divorce on the grounds of cruelty, the filing spouse must prove that the cruelty has made marriage intolerable for them. The cruelty must have been deliberate and calculated and must not have been provoked by the filing spouse. Acts such as physical attacks, repeated displays of rage involving screaming and violent behavior, as well as continuous false accusations, such as adultery and publicly berating and insulting a spouse or flaunting an affair with another person are some grounds of cruelty. The cruelty must have been recurrent. Single acts of cruelty in a marriage are usually not considered grounds for divorce.

=== Abandonment or desertion ===
Leaving the household with the consent of the filing spouse or for reasons consistent with the ongoing existence of a positive relationship, such as completing military service or employment assignments as required by law or to help provide for the family, do not constitute abandonment or desertion. However, refusing to have sexual relations with a spouse can be considered abandonment in some incidences. To obtain a divorce on grounds of abandonment the accused spouse must have voluntarily deserted the marital household with no justification or intention to return. The deserter must have left without the consent of the filing party and remained absent for an uninterrupted period of time. However, a spouse who is unjustly forced from the marital household by the other spouse or leaves to escape domestic violence would not be at fault of abandonment or desertion. In fact, in these cases, the spouse who remains at the home may be charged with "constructive desertion", if their behavior justifies the charge or if that spouse refuses a sincere offer of reconciliation.

=== Mental illness ===
Permanent mental illness and incurable insanity is a ground for divorce. To obtain a divorce on grounds of mental illness, the filing spouse must have proof that the other spouse suffers from a permanent psychological disorder that makes marriage impossible. The disorder must be incurable and the spouse must have been diagnosed by doctors competent in psychiatry.

=== Criminal conviction ===
The criminal conviction and imprisonment of a spouse is often considered grounds for a divorce. To obtain a divorce on grounds of criminal conviction, the filing spouse must be able to prove that their spouse has been convicted of an illegal offense. In many cases, it is required that the convicted spouse has been sentenced to serve time in prison in order for a divorce to be granted on the grounds of criminal conviction.

=== Other grounds ===
Other grounds for divorce may include alcohol or substance abuse and impotency, infertility or homosexuality (for heterosexual married couples) of the other party that was not discussed before the union. Strictly speaking, some jurisdictions may interpret the failure to disclose such conditions in advance as actual or constructive fraud that renders the marriage void, or at least voidable unless and until accepted by the other party once that other party learns of the condition and, thus, serves as grounds for an annulment rather than for dissolution of a theretofore-valid marriage.

==== Culture, religion, and disease ====
Several macro-level contexts also serve as reasons behind the decision to seek a divorce. These circumstances represent various aspects of the social life, from technology and social integration, to the economy and military service. Cultural customs or religious establishments can be the foundations for the breakdown of a marriage, as well.

Marrying someone of another religion, ethnicity, or vastly different culture could potentially pave the way for divorce. One partner might find himself unable to handle the societal pressures of the arrangement, or may feel compelled to conform to the spouse's/other culture's ideals (e.g. child rearing, dietary changes, etc.), which could lead to resentment. In New Hampshire, if a spouse's other half joins a religious sect, and that act leads to the destruction of the marriage, then the objecting partner can cite the episode as grounds for divorce; this is one of several grounds categorized unusual.

Divorce is not a possibility for the devotees of certain religious organizations. The Catholic Church, for example, does not permit its adherents to remarry after a divorce unless the marriage has been annulled. They also strongly discourage any legal divorce. Marriage annulments, however, are the current option for the followers of Catholicism to dissolve the official ties to their former significant other. The annulment, which renders a marriage null and void, can be sought on the basis of “adultery, pressure to marry, failure to consummate a marriage through vaginal intercourse, or a refusal to have children,” among other reasons. The Catholic Church considers couples that are divorced but have not been granted an annulment to still have a sacred bond of marriage even if legally divorced.

==== Substance abuse ====
Another of the many issues that could lead to a couple's divorce is substance abuse. There is a correlation between domestic violence and abuse of alcohol or narcotics. Since extreme mistreatment of one's spouse is a serious concern, it can be grounds for divorce. The same holds true in cases where a member of the couple feels uncomfortable with the other's overuse of controlled substances.

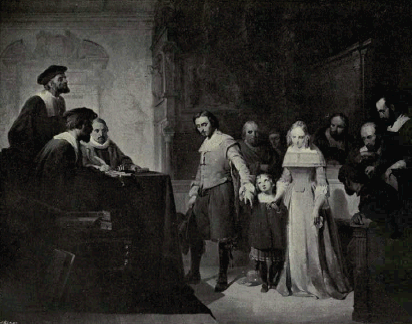
J.H. van de Laar. The Divorce, 1846. After choosing suitable grounds for divorce, the couple can eventually take its case to court.

==== Financial backing ====
A common reason cited as grounds for divorce is one spouse's unwillingness to support the other financially even though he or she has the economic means to do so. Part of the concept of marriage is its role of joining people; when two individuals marry, the sharing of resources is often one of many expected outcomes. If someone in the marriage refuses to uphold this communal monetary expectation, then the other person can file for divorce.

==== Sexual issues ====
Sexual incompatibility may be another cause for divorce. Further, in a number of states, impotency can also function as grounds for divorce. If a spouse is unable to have sex with his or her companion, the other member of the couple may file for divorce. To serve as valid grounds, the partner's inability to perform intercourse must have been present at the entire marriage; i.e. if the couple has consummated the relationship, they cannot use impotency as a justification for divorce.

== Defenses ==
=== The accused was not at fault ===
In some cases a spouse can prevent a fault divorce by convincing the court that he or she is not at fault. There are four types of defenses that are commonly used to prevent a fault divorce. The first defense, condonation, is used as a defense when the accusing spouse claims that the filing spouse has actually forgiven or accepted the wrongful behavior of their spouse prior to filing the charges and has in fact continued to have relations with them. Likewise, reconciliation, like condonation, is used by the accused spouse to prevent a fault divorce when they can prove that the filing spouse has forgiven them and reconciliation has occurred. Recrimination occurs when the spouse being accused of wrongdoing attempts to stop the divorce process by claiming that the other spouse is guilty of bad behavior themselves. Lastly, provocation is used when the spouse accused of abandoning the marriage defends the suit on the ground that the filing spouse provoked the abandonment.

=== Possible reconciliation ===
In a fault divorce, reconciliation and condonation share similarities. If either the husband or wife decides that forgiveness is given, a defense for fault cannot be obtained. As an example, in the case of abandonment, the divorce can't be based on abandonment because one of the spouses forgives on that issue. The couple would have to find another ground for divorce.

=== Insufficient separation ===
Under the no-fault grounds of separation for a pre-determined duration, the half of the couple who does not desire a divorce has only one recourse in contesting the break-up. If the span of the spouses’ separation does not last at least as long as was originally decided, then the dissenting person has a suitable defense to challenge the divorce. In the event of a couple's short-lived reunion or further sexual relations, the court can determine that the pair did not adhere to the time requirements of their separation agreement, and the divorce petition can be invalidated.
