= Tu quoque defense =

Attempted international criminal law defense

The tu quoque defense (Latin for 'you too') asserts that the authority trying a defendant has committed the same crimes of which they are accused. It is related to the legal principle of clean hands, reprisal, and "an eye for an eye". The tu quoque defense does not exist in international criminal law and has never been accepted by an international court.

Tu quoque was invoked during the Nuremberg trials, in 1945.

In 1987, during the trial of Nazi war criminal Klaus Barbie, the controversial lawyer Jacques Vergès argued that during the Algerian War, French officers such as General Jacques Massu had committed war crimes similar to those with which Barbie was being charged, and therefore the French state had no moral right to try Barbie. This defence was rejected by the court, which convicted Barbie. The ICTY also ruled that "tu quoque defence has no place in contemporary international humanitarian law".

== See also ==
- Superior orders
- Tu quoque
- Victor's justice
