= Tu quoque =

Fallacy regarding hypocrisy

Tu quoque, (Note: /tjuːˈkwoʊkwiː/; Latin for 'you also'. Also known as the appeal to hypocrisy, "you too" fallacy, "two wrongs" fallacy, "pot calling the kettle black" fallacy, and "look who's talking" fallacy.) literally "you, too", is a rhetorical technique that intends to discredit the opponent's argument by attacking the opponent's own personal behaviour and actions as being inconsistent with their argument, so that the opponent appears hypocritical. This specious reasoning is a special type of ad hominem attack. The Oxford English Dictionary cites John Cooke's 1614 stage play The Cittie Gallant as the earliest known use of the term in the English language.

== Form and explanation ==
The (fallacious) tu quoque argument follows the template (i.e., pattern):

1. Person A claims that a statement X is true.
2. Person B asserts that A's actions or past claims are inconsistent with the truth of claim X.
3. Therefore, X is false.

For example:

Alice: "Smoking is associated with chronic health disorders. You shouldn't smoke."
Bob: "But you smoke yourself. So much for your argument!"

Bob reasons that because Alice is being hypocritical, her statement about the effects of smoking must be false. But the truth of Alice's claim has no connection to whether or not she is a hypocrite.

== Similar concepts ==
A similar concept in politics is that of whataboutism: raising a counteraccusation, often in the form of a larger but unrelated issue. In the Soviet Union in the 1930s, the phrase "and you are lynching Negroes" was often raised against the United States. The same technique is used in red herrings, as Benito Mussolini attempted to do after the murder of Giacomo Matteotti.

== See also ==
- Accusation in a mirror – Hate speech incitement technique
- Clean hands – Concept that requires parties to be honest in court processes
- False equivalence – Logical fallacy of inconsistency
- In pari delicto – Latin for "in equal fault"
- List of fallacies
- List of Latin phrases
- Matthew 7:5
- People who live in glass houses shouldn't throw stones
- Psychological projection – Attributing parts of the self to others
- The pot calling the kettle black – Proverbial idiom referring to an example of hypocrisy
- Two wrongs don't make a right – Philosophical expression
- Victor's justice – Biased application of justice by the victors of an armed conflict
