= Foreign exploitation of American race relations =

Aspect of geopolitics

Foreign rivals of the United States, mainly Russia and China, have attempted to weaken American race relations as a geopolitical strategy. This manipulation is primarily done through misinformation posted on social media, targeting mainly African-Americans and Asian-Americans. Russia's social media campaign was thought to have affected the 2016 U.S. presidential election. The practice can be traced back to propaganda efforts of the Soviet Union's Comintern in the 1920s.

== China ==
China has engaged in an effort to destabilize the U.S. by weakening race relations. Their disinformation campaign, Dragonbridge, has exploited "racial strife and social injustice" to criticize American society. In 2019, Chinese government official Lijian Zhao posted a thread on Twitter about racism in America in response to Donald Trump signing bills supporting the 2019 Hong Kong protests. Zhao has posted other similar tweets. In 2021, pro-China fake accounts on Facebook, YouTube, and Twitter called for Asian Americans to protest racial injustice in the country. In 2023, CNN found that China had the world's largest known online disinformation campaign, using it to harass U.S. "residents, politicians, and businesses" with thousands of social media posts, many of which include racial slurs. Some of the racial slurs were directed toward Jiajun Qiu, an academic formerly from China who studies elections. Their network, the "spamoflague" network, has frequently brought up racism in the U.S., including the Native American genocide and the 2020 murder of George Floyd. The discussion of Floyd led to the Department of Justice filing a complaint against Chinese officials, alleging that they were attempting to undermine the 2022 U.S. midterm elections. Also in 2023, Microsoft claimed China was posting AI photos relating to Black Lives Matter to social media.

== Iran ==
In 2017, Facebook removed Iranian-linked fake social media accounts that had posted content about topics including race, which experts said was copying Russia's method to create divisions in the United States. Iranian-linked social media accounts in 2019 that posted about race in America were from Mexico and Venezuela. These posts were also posted in 2020 in preparation for the 2020 U.S. presidential election. After the election, the U.S. government claimed Russia and Iran interfered in the process.

== Soviet Union ==
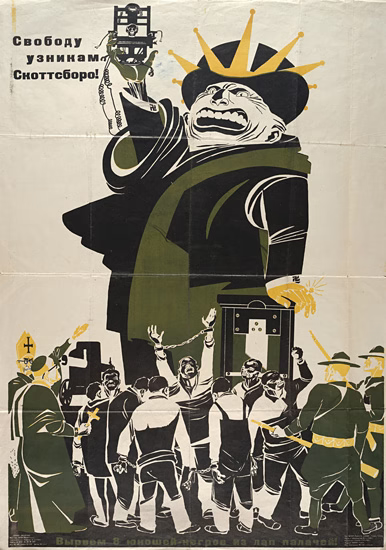
Dmitry Moor's 1932 poster, which says: "Freedom to the prisoners of Scottsboro!" In the poster, a group of white Christians surround the Scottsboro Boys, who are shackled

In 1928, the Soviet Union's Comintern initiated a plan to spread Communism throughout the world, and targeted African-Americans in the South, pushing "self-determination for the Black Belt". This plan was put in place by the "Negro Commission". By 1930, the Comintern began pushing an independent Black state in the south and South Africa. This proposal mimicked Marcus Garvey's 1921 "Africa for the Africans" proposal, which the Communists had previously denounced. In 1932, Dmirtry Moor, the Soviet Union's "most famous propaganda poster artist", created a poster that said "Freedom to the prisoners of Scottsboro!" This referenced the case of the Scottsboro Boys, nine Black teenagers in Alabama who were falsely accused of raping two white women, and were wrongly convicted by an all-white jury. That year, they also invited a group of Black American artists, including the poet Langston Hughes, to Russia to make a film about American racism titled "Black or White". The film was never completed. The Soviets exploited race and the Great Depression for their own economic benefit, by advertising themselves as "a racial utopia" where "ethnic, national, and religious divisions didn't exist". They brought over several hundred African-Americans to build the cotton industry in Central Asia.

=== Cold War and the Little Rock Crisis ===
During the Cold War, the U.S. was influenced to improve its race relations, as they thought they "couldn't lead the world if it was seen as repressing people of color", writes legal historian Mary Dudziak. The Soviets often used the phrase "And you lynch Negroes" when criticized for their domestic policy. The Soviet school system highlighted American exploitation of Black people. They exploited news regarding the Little Rock Nine, nine Black students who were prevented from attending Little Rock Central High School. The Komsomolskaya Pravda, the Soviet Union's communist youth organization newspaper, ran a story titled "Troops Advance Against Children!". Izvestia, another major newspaper, extensively covered the Little Rock Crisis, saying: "right now, behind the facade of the so-called 'American democracy,' a tragedy is unfolding which cannot but arouse ire and indignation in the heart of every honest man".

The purpose of these attacks were to discredit America's foreign relations with the countries that the U.S. was trying to convince to be a liberal democracy. The timing of this campaign was unfavorable, in part because of the contrast between American police brutality and the mid-century decolonization of Africa. Secretary of State John Foster Dulles said "this situation was ruining our foreign policy. The effect of this in Asia and Africa will be worse for us than Hungary was for the Russians." Henry Cabot Lodge, the U.S. ambassador to the United Nations, wrote to President Eisenhower in 1957, "Here at the United Nations I can see clearly the harm that the riots in Little Rock are doing to our foreign relations" ... "More than two-thirds of the world is non-white and the reactions of the representatives of these people is easy to see. I suspect that we lost several votes on the Chinese communist item because of Little Rock." Eisenhower inserted a passage into his national address on Little Rock regarding the Soviet's campaign:

At a time when we face grave situations abroad because of the hatred that Communism bears toward a system of government based on human rights, it would be difficult to exaggerate the harm that is being done to the prestige and influence, and indeed to the safety, of our nation and the world. Our enemies are gloating over this incident and using it everywhere to misrepresent our whole nation. We are portrayed as a violator of those standards of conduct which the peoples of the world united to proclaim in the Charter of the United Nations.

— President Eisenhower, "Radio and Television Address to the American People on the Situation in Little Rock", September 24, 1957

After receiving a question from Eisenhower regarding how to fix the crisis, Lodge wrote to have U.S. diplomatic representatives extend hospitality to distinguished people of color.

Western governments during the Cold War also pushed the idea that African or Black liberation movements were associated with Soviet or communist propaganda.

=== Other efforts ===
In the 1960s, the KGB attempted to undermine the work of Martin Luther King Jr. and frame him as a political insurgent against the U.S. government. In 1980, Soviets used a Black newspaper in San Francisco to highlight an alleged leaked memo of the Jimmy Carter administration to divide Black Africans and Black African-Americans. In the 1980s, Soviet intelligence officers created the theory that HIV and AIDS were developed by the Central Intelligence Agency as a bioweapon targeting non-whites. In 1984, ahead of that year's Summer Olympics, the Soviets forged threatening letters allegedly from the Ku Klux Klan, and sent them to the Olympic committees of African and Asian nations to scare them from sending their teams to the games. At some point, there was a campaign to pit Black activists and Jewish Zionist groups in New York against each other.

== Russian Federation ==
=== 2010s racial injustice protests and the 2016 election ===
In the 2010s, Russia exploited racial divisions on social media for the purpose of increasing divisions in Western democracies, and to influence the 2016 U.S. presidential election. Social media accounts tied to Russia used social media and Google during the 2016 U.S. presidential election season to "deepen political and racial tensions in the United States". This was part of a covert influence campaign launched by Russia against the U.S., to promote the election of Donald Trump. One method was to depress the Black vote of Hillary Clinton by bringing up concerns about her. Black Americans were told to not vote for Clinton or vote for Jill Stein. Black voter turnout in 2016 declined for the first time in 20 years, though it is unknown how much of it could be traced to the campaign. Much of this campaign was performed by Russia's Internet Research Agency (IRA), which is described as an Internet troll farm. U.S. prosecutors said the IRA played a significant role in the election. The IRA targeted Black Americans the most. They eventually posted 1,000 videos relating to Black Lives Matter and police brutality on YouTube, and posted "Blue Lives Matter" content when there was a noticeable about of anti-police sentiment.

The campaign was discovered in September 2017. That month, Facebook admitted a Russia-backed group purchased divisive ads regarding race and other topics on their site. In 2019, the Senate Intelligence Committee determined that the Internet Research Agency, and Russia's military intelligence directorate, GRU, tried to disrupt the election. The committee found that Russian government agencies had more than 11 million engagements with Facebook users, and mobilized the signing of petitions against racism. The committee found that out of 81 Facebook pages created by the IRA, 30 targeted Black audiences. Two-thirds of their activities were directed at African Americans in metropolitan areas. They reproduced videos of police brutality, and amplified football quarterback Colin Kaepernick's kneeling protest. Views for and against the protest were both amplified. They attempted to get Black voters to boycott the election or vote for a third-party candidate.

In 2019, documents were revealed detailing conversations between associates of Russian government-linked Yevgeny Prigozhin, discussing plans to manipulate and radicalize Black Americans. The documents contained a plan, titled "Development Strategy of a Pan-African State on U.S. Territory", to recruit Black Americans to join camps in Africa for combat training and experience in sabotage. The recruits would then be sent back to the U.S. to do violence and attempt to establish a Pan-African state in Alabama, Georgia, Mississippi, Louisiana, and South Carolina. There is no evidence that the plan was enacted. Some of the documents were sent by Dzheykhun "Jay" Aslanov, an employee of the Internet Research Agency. In 2018, Aslanov was indicted by Robert Mueller for his role in the IRA.

In March 2020, Twitter released a data set showing 39,964 tweets from 71 accounts which were associated with the Russian government and claimed to be in the United States. The accounts were located in Ghana and Nigeria. The most common hashtags used were #blacklivesmatter (2,109 mentions), #racism (1,381), #policebrutality (1,159), and #blackexcellence (805). Some of the most used word pairs were "African American," "police officer," "lives matter," "black people" and "human rights". The Washington Post found there was a higher proportion of negative tweets (59.9%) than positive (22.4%) and neutral (17.7%) tweets.

==== Groups linked to Russia ====
The Russian-backed social media account "Blacktivist" was created sometime before April 2016, and organized multiple protests events, including a protest over a death at a detention center in Erie County, New York City. 360,000 had followed the Blacktivist page on Facebook, surpassing the official Black Lives Matter account. It also had 11 million user engagements. The page posted stories of police brutality, and honored Freddie Gray, who had died in police custody in 2015. At an April 2016 protest march, a speech was given by Diane Butler, the mother of Tyrone West, who died in police custody after being pulled over during a traffic stop. Hundreds had RSVP'd to the event of Facebook.

Around 2016, a site called "BlackMattersUS" was created, eventually gaining 200,000 followers. The site, which was connected to the IRA, focused on "racism and police brutality themes". One writer for the site was Micah White, a cofounder of Occupy Wall Street. He was first contacted in May 2016 by an alleged freelance reporter named "Yan Big Davis". They tricked activist Conrad James into creating a September 2016 rally to honor Keith Lamont Scott, a Black man who was shot by police in Charlotte, North Carolina. A woman named "Stephanie Williamson", who was allegedly the organization's spokeswoman, gave James a bank card to pay for the rally expenses. James also worked with the organization to hold a larger rally in October. By October 2017, BlackMattersUS' Twitter, Instagram, and Facebook accounts were suspended.

An IRA-linked campaign known as "Don't Shoot Us" was present on Facebook, Twitter, YouTube, Tumblr, and the video game Pokémon Go. Their name may be a reference to "Hands up, don't shoot", a slogan that became popular in protests against the shooting of Michael Brown. They organized two protests in July 2016: one in Saint Paul, Minnesota, regarding the police killing of Philando Castile, and one in Baltimore, regarding the death of Freddie Gray. They highlighted incidents of police brutality, and uploaded over 200 videos of said incidents to their YouTube page, "Don't Shoot". The channel posted videos between May and December 2016, and gained more than 360,000 views. Their Facebook page gained 254,000 likes by September 2016. The Tumblr account encouraged readers to join a Pokémon Go contest at locations with police brutality incidents. There is no evidence anyone joined the contest. In January 2016, the International Press Foundation (IPF), an organization of journalism students and trainees, interviewed a man named "Daniel Reed", who claimed to be the Chief Editor of the group's website, "DoNotShoot.Us". Reed responded to the IPF's questions in a Microsoft Word document. Later, CNN investigated the document, and found within its metadata the Russian word for "name", "Название". This implied the document was written on a computer running Russian as its primary language.

The IRA was also linked to an organization called "Black Fist", which taught Black communities self-defense. MMA fighter Omowale Adewale was one of the people convinced to be an instructor with Black Fist. He was first contacted by a man named "Taylor" in January 2017, and was paid $350 a month for his work. They spoke on the phone, where Taylor used an African accent. The classes in Queens started in March, and grew after Taylor paid for Facebook ads and other promotions for the classes. Another class was created in Brooklyn. The classes stopped in May.

On March 21, 2017, Russia created a group called "Resisters", which made an event page in 2018 called "No Unite the Right 2 – DC", a counterprotest against the August 12 Unite the Right 2 rally in Washington D.C. The rally would be held on the one-year anniversary of the Unite the Right rally in Charlottesville, Virginia, where a white supremacist drove his car into a crowd of counter-protestors, killing one woman. Resisters had about 20,000 followers. Facebook deleted the page that month. According to American intelligence, after the first Unite the Right rally, Russia "concluded that promoting hate groups was the most effective method of sowing discord in the United States".

Other Russian accounts were a social media page named "Woke Blacks", an Instagram page, @blackstagram, which had 303,663 followers, and a YouTube page titled "BlackToLive".

==== Reactions ====
In December 2018, the NAACP called for a boycott of Facebook in response to the campaign, which was titled #LogOutFacebook.

Foreign Policy magazine criticized discussion of the campaign for an alleged assumption that Black Americans could be easily swayed by the propaganda.

=== Alt-right ===
The United States alt-right movement has been linked to Russia.

=== 2020 police brutality protests ===
In late May 2020, protests regarding police brutality started around the United States, in response to the recent murders of George Floyd and Ahmaud Arbery, and the killing of Breonna Taylor. Black Lives Matter supporters were involved in the protests. Russian media outlets used the #BlackLivesMatter hashtag on social media to create division while highlighting America's racial injustices, and Russian bots spread misinformation about the protests. Members of Congress, including Marco Rubio and Michael Waltz voiced concern about the matter, and members Raja Krishnamoorti and Val Demings wrote to John Ratcliffe, Director of National Intelligence, requesting information on the foreign efforts. Waltz claimed he had seen evidence showing the involvement of China and Iran in the campaign as well.

== See also ==
- State-sponsored Internet propaganda
