= Two wrongs don't make a right =

Philosophical expression

In rhetoric and ethics, "two wrongs don't make a right" and "two wrongs make a right" are phrases that denote philosophical norms. "Two wrongs make a right" has been considered as a fallacy of relevance, in which an allegation of wrongdoing is countered with a similar allegation. Its antithesis, "two wrongs don't make a right", is a proverb used to rebuke or renounce wrongful conduct as a response to another's transgression. "Two wrongs make a right" is considered "one of the most common fallacies in Western philosophy".

== History ==
The phrase "two wrongs does make one right" appears in a poem dated to 1734, published in The London Magazine.

This is an informal fallacy that occurs when assuming that, if one wrong is committed, then another wrong will cancel it out.

== Examples ==
Speaker A: You shouldn't embezzle from your employer. It's against the law.
Speaker B: My employer cheats on their taxes. That's against the law, too!

If Speaker B believes in the maxim "the law should be followed," then their unstated premise is that breaking the law (or the wrong) is justified, as long as the other party also does so. Yet, if Speaker B believes the maxim "it is acceptable to break the law to wrong those who also break the law", they are committing no logical fallacy. From the conversation above, it is impossible to know which Speaker B believes.

This fallacy is often used as a red herring, or an attempt to change or distract from the issue. For example:

Speaker A: President Williams lied in his testimony to Congress. He should not do that.
Speaker B: But you are ignoring the fact that President Roberts lied in his Congressional testimony!

Even if President Roberts lied in his Congressional testimony, this does not establish a precedent that makes it acceptable for President Williams to do so as well (at best, it means Williams is no worse than Roberts). By invoking the fallacy, the contested issue of lying is ignored (cf. whataboutism).

The tu quoque fallacy is a specific type of "two wrongs make a right". Accusing another of not practicing what they preach, while appropriate in some situations, (Note: For instance, if A is suing B for alleged misconduct on the part of B, but A is themself guilty of similar misconduct, B exposing A's misconduct would bar A's suit under the unclean hands doctrine.) does not in itself invalidate an action or statement that is perceived as contradictory.

== Criticism ==
Common use of the term, in the realm of business ethics, has been criticised by scholar Gregory S. Kavka writing in the Journal of Business Ethics. Kavka refers back to philosophical concepts of retribution by Thomas Hobbes. He states that if something supposedly held up as a moral standard or common social rule is violated enough in society, then an individual or group within society can break that standard or rule as well, since this keeps them from being unfairly disadvantaged. As well, in specific circumstances violations of social rules can be defensible if done as direct responses to other violations. For example, Kavka states that it is wrong to deprive someone of their property, but it is right to take property back from a criminal who takes another's property in the first place. He also states that one should be careful not to use this ambiguity as an excuse to recklessly violate ethical rules.

Conservative journalist Victor Lasky wrote in his book It Didn't Start With Watergate that, while two wrongs do not make a right, if a set of immoral things are done and left unprosecuted, this creates a legal precedent. Thus, people who do the same wrongs in the future should rationally expect to get away with them as well. Lasky uses as an analogy the situation between John F. Kennedy's wiretapping of Martin Luther King Jr. (which led to nothing) and Richard Nixon's actions in Watergate (which Nixon thought would also lead to nothing).

== See also ==
- Eye for an eye
- Double negation
- False dilemma
- False equivalence
- Lesser of two evils principle
- Punishment
- Retributive justice
- Revenge
- Tit for tat
- The enemy of my enemy is my friend
- Whataboutism
