= Stephen Richards Graubard =

American historian and author (1924-2021)

Stephen Richards Graubard (December 5, 1924 – May 27, 2021) was an American historian and author. He was an editor at Daedalus from 1961 until 1999. He was a professor at Harvard University and then emeritus professor at Brown University.

== Books ==
- Kissinger: Portrait of a Mind (W. W. Norton, 1973)
- The Artificial Intelligence Debate: False Starts, Real Foundations (MIT Press, 1988)
- Books, Bricks & Bytes: Libraries In The Twenty-First Century
- Minnesota, Real & Imagined: Essays on the State and Its Culture (2000)
- The Presidents: The Transformation Of The American Presidency From Theodore Roosevelt To George W. Bush (Penguin, 2004); published in the US as Command of Office: How War, Secrecy, and Deception Transformed the Presidency From Theodore Roosevelt to George W. Bush (2004)
