= Armen Oganesyan =

Armen Garnikovich Oganesyan (Russian: Оганесян, Армен Гарникович; born April 4, 1954) is the CEO of Russian state radio station Voice of Russia. He was educated at Moscow State University, Department of Journalism.
