= Connivance =

Type of conspiracy

Connivance is the act of conniving or conspiring, especially with the knowledge of and active or passive consent to wrongdoing or a twist in truth, to make something appear as something that it is not.

A legal finding of connivance may be made when an accuser has assisted in the act about which they are complaining. In some legal jurisdictions, and for certain behaviors, it may prevent the accuser from prevailing.

For example, if someone were to entice their spouse to commit adultery, they might be blocked (or estopped) from divorcing their spouse on grounds of that adultery. See Sargent v. Sargent, Court of Chancery of New Jersey, 1920 (Held a man who had not taken active steps to prevent his wife's adultery was not entitled to divorce because he was a participator and consenter to her adultery).

== See also ==
- Collusive lawsuit
- Fruit of the poisonous tree
- Hypocrisy
