= Recrimination =

Legal instrument in divorce law

In law, recrimination is a defense in an action for divorce based on the fault of the defendant in which the defendant makes a similar accusation against the plaintiff. To put it simply, it is the defense of "you, too."

Recrimination was generally considered by family law experts to be one of the most dysfunctional and illogical aspects of the old fault-based divorce system in common law countries. For example, in the context of a marriage where the marital relationship has collapsed to the point that both spouses are openly committing adultery, the assertion by either spouse of this defense would prevent a divorce even though the family unit is clearly no longer capable of functioning. As one law professor later explained: "In such a case of mutual fault, the court was bound to withhold its decree, thus visiting the parties with the 'Sartresque punishment of remaining together and hating it'".

As a result, the defense was formally abolished by statute in many jurisdictions when they converted to a no-fault divorce regime, and it is generally regarded today as obsolete.

New York law is one of very few jurisdictions that retain this defense.

The corollary principle of comparative rectitude ameliorated the effects of the recrimination doctrine by holding that if the offenses were of entirely different orders of seriousness, the spouse guilty of the lesser fault was still entitled to relief.

== See also ==
- Antanagoge, the same usage in rhetoric
- Defenses to divorce in United States law
