= The pot calling the kettle black =

Proverbial idiom referring to an example of hypocrisy

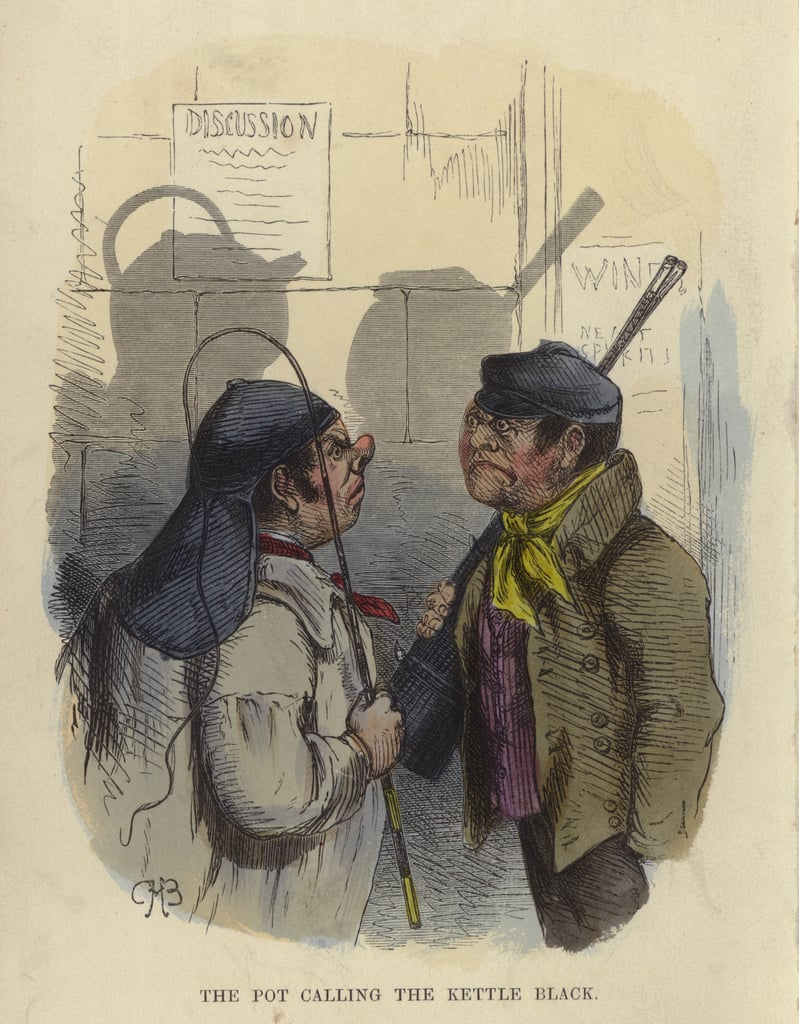
Charles H. Bennett's illustration of the saying (1860), with a coalman confronting a chimney sweep

"The pot calling the kettle black" is a proverbial idiom that may be of Spanish (or ultimately Italian) origin, of which English versions began to appear in the first half of the 17th century. It means a situation in which somebody accuses someone else of a fault which the accuser shares, and therefore is an example of psychological projection, or hypocrisy. Use of the expression to discredit or deflect a claim of wrongdoing by attacking the originator of the claim for their own similar behaviour (rather than acknowledging the guilt of both) is the tu quoque logical fallacy.

== Origin ==
The earliest appearance of the idiom is in Thomas Shelton's 1620 translation of the Spanish novel Don Quixote. The protagonist is growing increasingly restive under the criticisms of his servant Sancho Panza, one of which is that "You are like what is said that the frying-pan said to the kettle, 'Avant, black-browes'." The Spanish text at this point reads: Dijo la sartén a la caldera, Quítate allá ojinegra (Said the pan to the pot, get out of there black-eyes). It is identified as a proverb (refrán) in the text, functioning as a retort to the person who criticises another of the same defect that he plainly has. Among several variations, the one where the pan addresses the pot as culinegra (black-arse) makes clear that they are dirtied in common by contact with the cooking fire. This translation was also recorded in England soon afterwards as "The pot calls the pan burnt-arse" in John Clarke's collection of proverbs, Paroemiologia Anglo-Latina (1639).

A nearer approach to the present wording is provided by William Penn in his collection Some Fruits of Solitude in Reflections and Maxims (1682):

"If thou hast not conquer'd thy self in that which is thy own particular Weakness, thou hast no Title to Virtue, tho' thou art free of other Men's. For a Covetous Man to inveigh against Prodigality, an Atheist against Idolatry, a Tyrant against Rebellion, or a Lyer against Forgery, and a Drunkard against Intemperance, is for the Pot to call the Kettle black."

But, apart from the final example in this passage, there is no strict accord between the behaviour of the critic and the person censured.

An alternative modern interpretation, far removed from the original intention, argues that while the pot is sooty (from being placed on a fire), the kettle is polished and shiny; hence, when the pot accuses the kettle of being black, it is the pot's own sooty reflection that it sees: the pot accuses the kettle of a fault that only the pot has, rather than one that they share. The point is illustrated by a poem that appeared anonymously in an early issue of St. Nicholas Magazine from 1876:

"Oho!" said the pot to the kettle;
"You are dirty and ugly and black!
Sure no one would think you were metal,
Except when you're given a crack."

"Not so! not so!" kettle said to the pot;
"'Tis your own dirty image you see;
For I am so clean – without blemish or blot –
That your blackness is mirrored in me."

== Similar themes in antiquity ==
- In ancient Greece, mention of 'the Snake and the Crab' signified much the same, where the critic censures its own behaviour in another. The first instance of this is in a drinking song (skolion) dating from the late 6th or early 5th century BCE. The fable ascribed to Aesop concerns a mother crab and its young, where the mother tells the child to walk straight and is asked in return to demonstrate how that is done.
- The same theme differently expressed occurs in the Aramaic version of the story of Ahiqar, dating from about 500 BCE. 'The bramble sent to the pomegranate tree saying, "Wherefore the multitude of thy thorns to him that toucheth thy fruit?" The pomegranate tree answered and said to the bramble, "Thou art all thorns to him that toucheth thee".
- Talmud: "Do not ascribe to your fellow your own blemish" (BM 59b) ... "a person stigmatizes another with his own blemish" (Kid. 70b).
- The Mote and the Beam – In Matthew 7:3-5, the target is criticism of a less significant failing by those who are worse: "Why do you look at the speck of sawdust in your brother's eye and pay no attention to the plank in your own eye?"

== See also ==
- Tu quoque
- Physician, heal thyself
- Whataboutism
