= Antanagoge =

Redirecting rhetorical device

An antanagoge (Greek ἀνταναγωγή, a leading or bringing up), is a figure in rhetoric, in which, not being able to answer the accusation of an adversary, a person instead makes a counter-allegation or counteracting an opponent's proposal with an opposing proposition in one's speech or writing.

Antanagoge places a negative point next to and/or between a positive point, attempting to redirect attention away from the negative point.

It may also refer to placing a positive outlook on a situation that has a negative connotation, such as in the following examples:

Literary examples

"When life gives you lemons, make lemonade."
"I got in a car accident, but I was planning on getting a new car anyway."
"Many are the pains and perils to be passed,
But great is the gain and glory at the last."

Usage

Antanagoge is a term that is used to recognize a bad or unpleasant thing and to highlight something good or compensating. The technique can thus shift the focus of the listener from an acknowledged disadvantage to an associated benefit. The Latin word compensatio is also related to the rhetorical term antanagoge.

The device can be employed if a speaker or writer is unable to just delete or deny a negative attribute. Rather, a positive consideration is presented with the negative consideration, which offsets the negative. This is a distinction that sets antanagoge apart from a rejection or denial of criticism. Historical treatments of rhetoric have also used the term antenagoge, and the concept of a "recompencer" is also linked to it.

== See also ==
- Paradiastole
