= List of countries by marriage and divorce rates =

Statistics on divorces by country/region

This is a list of countries by marriage and divorce rates, where divorce demography is the study of divorce statistics in a population.

== Metrics ==
There are three ratios used for divorce rate calculations: crude divorce rate, refined divorce rate, and divorce-to-marriage ratio. Each of these calculations has weaknesses and can be misleading.

=== Crude divorce rate ===
This is divorces per 1,000 population per year. For example, if a city has 10,000 people living in it, and 30 couples divorce in one year, then the crude divorce rate for that year is 3 divorces per 1,000 residents.
$$\text{Crude Divorce Rate} =  \frac {\text{Number  of  divorces}}{\text{Population}} \times 1000$$
The crude divorce rate can give a general overview of marriage in an area, but it does not take people who cannot marry into account. For example, it would include young children, who are clearly not of marriageable age in its sample. In a place with large numbers of children or single adults, the crude divorce rate can seem low. In a place with few children and single adults, the crude divorce rate can seem high.

=== Refined divorce rate ===
This measures the number of divorces per 1,000 women married to men, so that all unmarried persons are left out of the calculation. For example, if that same city of 10,000 people has 3,000 married women, and 30 couples divorce in one year, then the refined divorce rate is 10 divorces per 1,000 married women.
$$\text{Refined Divorce Rate} = \frac {\text{Number  of  divorces}}{\text{Number of married women}} \times 1000$$

=== Divorce-to-marriage ratio ===
This compares the number of divorces in a given year to the number of marriages in that same year (the ratio of the crude divorce rate to the crude marriage rate). For example, if there are 500 divorces and 1,000 marriages in a given year in a given area, the ratio would be one divorce for every two marriages, e.g. a ratio of 0.50 (50%).
$$\text{Divorce-to-marriage ratio} = \frac {\text{Number  of  divorces}}{\text{Number of marriages}}$$
However, this measurement compares two unlike populations – those who can marry and those who can divorce. Say there exists a community with 100,000 married couples, and very few people capable of marriage, for reasons such as age. If 1,000 people obtain divorces and 1,000 people get married in the same year, the ratio is one divorce for every marriage, which may lead people to think that the community's relationships are extremely unstable, despite the number of married people not changing. This is also true in reverse: a community with very many people of marriageable age may have 10,000 marriages and 1,000 divorces, leading people to believe that it has very stable relationships.

Furthermore, these two rates are not directly comparable since the marriage rate only examines the current year, while the divorce rate examines the outcomes of marriages for many previous years. This does not equate to the proportion of marriages in a given single-year cohort that will ultimately end in divorce. In any given year, underlying rates may change, and this can affect the ratio. For example, during an economic downturn, some couples might postpone a divorce because they can't afford to live separately. These individual choices could seem to temporarily improve the divorce-to-marriage ratio.

== Statistics ==
Divorce statistics by country/region (per 1,000 population / year)
Country/region	Continent	Rate		Ratio (%)	Data Source Year
Country/region	Continent	Marriage	Divorce	Ratio (%)	Data Source Year
United Kingdom ^{(more info)}	Europe	1.3	1.5	115.38	2020
Russia	Europe	5.3	3.9	73.58	2020
Ukraine	Europe	4.5	3.1	68.89	2020
Guam		6.3	4.3	68.25	2019
Chile ^{(more info)}	South America	2.7	1.8	66.67	2021
Puerto Rico	North America	4.0	2.6	65	2019
Australia ^{(more info)}	Oceania	3.5	2.2	62.86	2021
Costa Rica	North America	4.2	2.6	61.9	2023
Georgia	Europe	6.0	3.7	61.67	2023
Moldova	Europe	6.4	3.9	60.94	2023
Belarus	Europe	6.1	3.7	60.66	2023
China ^{(more info)}	Asia	4.3	2.5	58.14	2024
Andorra	Europe	4.7	2.7	57.45	2023
Kuwait	Asia	2.8	1.6	57.14	2023
Finland	Europe	3.7	2.1	56.76	2023
Luxembourg	Europe	3.8	2.1	55.26	2023
Dominican Republic	North America	4.4	2.4	54.55	2023
France	Europe	3.7	1.9	51.35	2016
Lithuania	Europe	4.9	2.5	51.02	2023
Latvia	Europe	5.5	2.8	50.91	2024
Sweden	Europe	4.2	2.1	50	2024
Gibraltar		6.7	3.2	47.76	2010
Portugal	Europe	3.5	1.6	45.71	2023
Spain	Europe	3.5	1.6	45.71	2023
San Marino	Europe	3.3	1.5	45.45	2020
Greenland		5.3	2.4	45.28	2023
Italy	Europe	3.1	1.4	45.16	2023
Norway ^{(more info)}	Europe	3.6	1.6	44.44	2023
Cuba ^{(more info)}	North America	3.7	1.6	43.24	2021
Colombia	South America	1.4	0.6	42.86	2022
Belgium ^{(more info)}	Europe	4.0	1.7	42.5	2023
Canada ^{(more info)}	North America	2.6	1.1	42.31	2020
United States ^{(more info)}	North America	6.0	2.5	41.67	2021
New Zealand ^{(more info)}	Oceania	3.6	1.5	41.67	2023
Denmark	Europe	5.3	2.2	41.51	2023
Macau		4.6	1.9	41.3	2023
Bulgaria	Europe	3.4	1.4	41.18	2023
Taiwan	Asia	5.7	2.3	40.35	2018
Czech Republic	Europe	4.5	1.8	40	2023
European Union		4.0	1.6	40	2023
Panama	North America	3.0	1.2	40	2021
Estonia	Europe	4.8	1.9	39.58	2023
Bermuda		4.9	1.9	38.78	2021
Greece	Europe	3.9	1.5	38.46	2023
Switzerland	Europe	4.7	1.8	38.3	2022
Liechtenstein	Europe	5.5	2.1	38.18	2020
Iceland	Europe	5.0	1.9	38	2020
Saudi Arabia	Asia	5.6	2.1	37.5	2020
Poland ^{(more info)}	Europe	4.0	1.5	37.5	2023
Iran ^{(more info)}	Asia	6.5	2.4	36.92	2021
Netherlands	Europe	3.8	1.4	36.84	2023
Japan ^{(more info)}	Asia	4.1	1.5	36.59	2022
South Korea ^{(more info)}	Asia	4.7	1.7	36.17	2025
Trinidad and Tobago	North America	6.3	2.2	34.92	2005
Germany ^{(more info)}	Europe	4.3	1.5	34.88	2023
Mexico	North America	3.9	1.3	33.33	2022
Qatar	Asia	3.3	1.1	33.33	2011
Slovenia	Europe	3.0	1.0	33.33	2023
Kazakhstan	Asia	6.1	2.0	32.79	2023
Hungary	Europe	5.2	1.7	32.69	2023
Sudan	Africa	4.6	1.5	32.61	2018
Austria	Europe	5.0	1.6	32	2023
Guatemala	North America	3.8	1.2	31.58	2008
Ireland	Europe	1.9	0.6	31.58	2020
Serbia	Europe	4.8	1.5	31.25	2023
Suriname	South America	4.2	1.3	30.95	2007
Israel ^{(more info)}	Asia	5.5	1.7	30.91	2021
Slovakia	Europe	4.9	1.5	30.61	2023
Mauritius	Africa	6.9	2.1	30.43	2023
Azerbaijan	Asia	5.6	1.7	30.36	2021
Jordan	Asia	5.6	1.7	30.36	2022
Turkey	Europe	6.6	2.0	30.3	2023
Faroe Islands		4.1	1.2	29.27	2023
Cyprus	Asia	8.9	2.6	29.21	2019
Brunei	Asia	5.6	1.6	28.57	2023
Kyrgyzstan	Asia	6.4	1.8	28.13	2023
Mongolia	Asia	5.0	1.4	28	2023
Egypt ^{(more info)}	Africa	8.6	2.4	27.91	2021
Singapore ^{(more info)}	Asia	7.1	1.9	26.76	2021
Thailand	Asia	5.5	1.4	25.45	2005
Saint Lucia	North America	2.8	0.7	25	2004
United Arab Emirates ^{(more info)}	Asia	2.8	0.7	25	2005
Croatia	Europe	4.5	1.1	24.44	2023
Montenegro	Europe	5.6	1.3	23.21	2023
Libya	Africa	10.8	2.5	23.15	2008
El Salvador	North America	3.5	0.8	22.86	2006
Grenada	North America	5.0	1.1	22	2001
Brazil	South America	6.6	1.4	21.21	2009
Romania	Europe	5.8	1.2	20.69	2023
Malaysia	Asia	6.6	1.3	19.7	2021
Jamaica	North America	6.1	1.2	19.67	2018
Ecuador	South America	5.6	1.1	19.64	2006
Malta ^{(more info)}	Europe	4.8	0.9	18.75	2022
Uzbekistan	Asia	7.8	1.4	17.95	2023
Nicaragua	North America	4.5	0.8	17.78	2005
Peru	South America	2.3	0.4	17.39	2021
South Africa ^{(more info)}	Africa	3.5	0.6	17.14	2009
Tonga	Oceania	7.1	1.2	16.9	2003
Lebanon	Asia	9.5	1.6	16.84	2007
Bahamas	North America	6.1	1.0	16.39	2007
Tajikistan	Asia	8.8	1.4	15.91	2019
Algeria	Africa	10.1	1.6	15.84	2013
Albania	Europe	7.0	1.1	15.71	2021
Bosnia and Herzegovina	Europe	5.4	0.8	14.81	2019
North Macedonia	Europe	6.9	1.0	14.49	2023
Venezuela	South America	1.4	0.2	14.29	2019
Saint Vincent and the Grenadines	North America	5.8	0.8	13.79	2007
Seychelles	Africa	13.7	1.8	13.14	2023
Syria	Asia	10.6	1.3	12.26	2006
India ^{(more info)}	Asia	10	0.6	6	2025
Vietnam	Asia	5.1	0.2	3.92	2021
Iraq	Asia	Unknown	2.24		2024
Maldives	Asia	Unknown	5.52		2023
Sri Lanka	Asia	6.9	?		2023

== Worldwide ==
Worldwide share of women aged 15–49 who are married or in a union
1970	1980	1990	2000	2010	2020	2024
69.4%	68.5%	67.6%	67.5%	66%	64.7%	63.8%

== See also ==
- List of countries by age at first marriage
