= Law of Belgium =

The legal system of Belgium is based on civil law. Belgium is a federal state with a constitutional monarchy and is multilingual. The language differences have caused political and legal problems over time. Official languages are French, Dutch and German.

== History ==
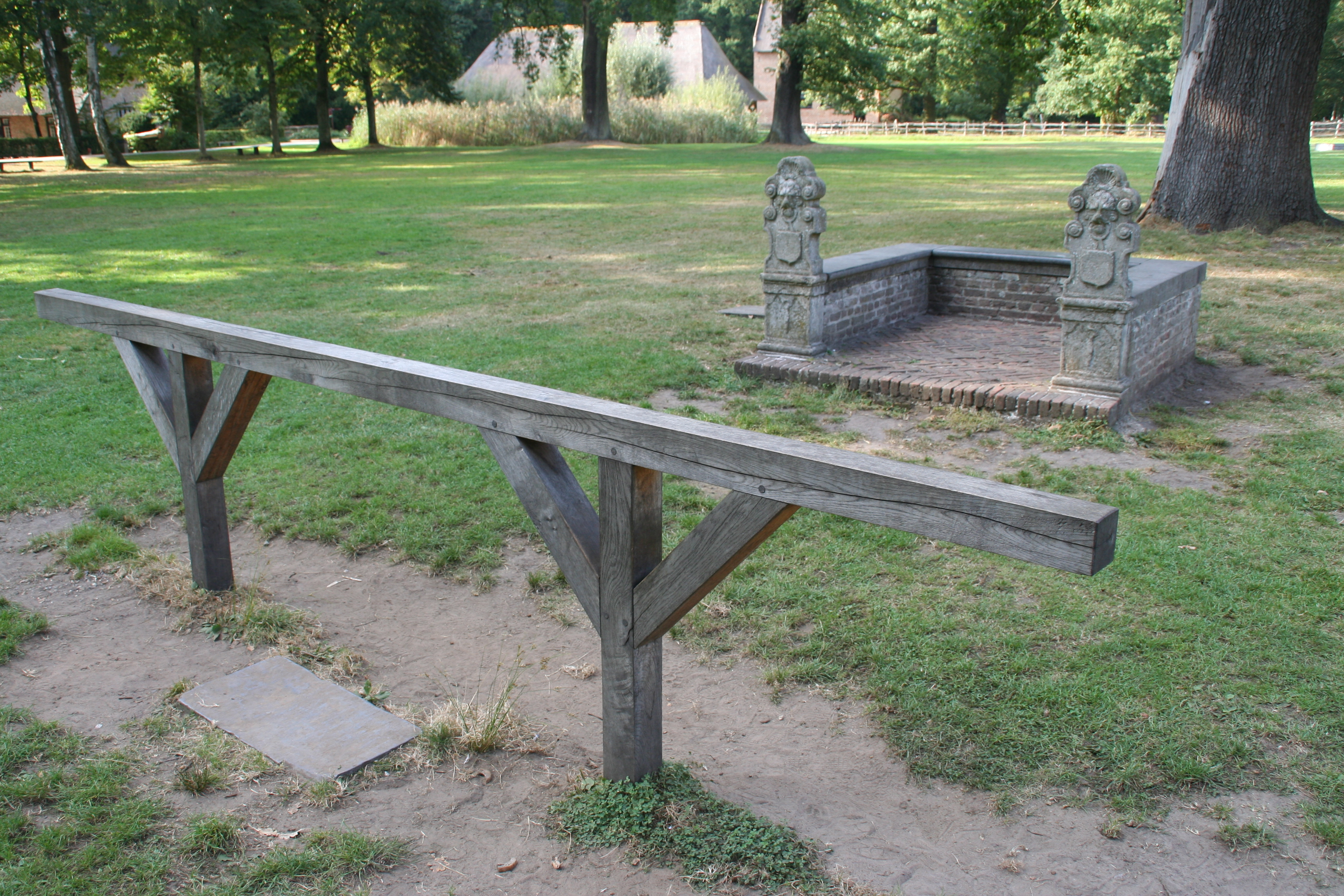
An ancien régime outdoor court, reconstructed at Bokrijk based on an original at Oudenaarde

The Belgian state was formed as a constitutional monarchy in 1830, after a long period of domination by France, from 1714 to 1814. Belgium endeavored to make changes and amendments in their legal system which are mostly in French, Dutch and German. This change started to produce satisfactory results from the early industrialization in the 19th century. The major clauses generally have remained unaltered. French codes are the typical example of a legal system in Belgium affected by conquests of France. It was implemented in Belgium after Napoleon conquests in 1795. This remained unchanged since Belgium became a state in 1830. Law system in Belgium gradually developed with constitutional reforms since 1970. Belgium has applied European legislation and given regard to decisions of the European Court of Justice. Also, Belgium signed the European Convention on Human Rights (ECHR) in November 1950, which is the day of its adoption, and finally ratified it in June 1955. Belgium also accepted the individual complaints procedure a few weeks after ratification, in July 1955.

== Constitution ==
Belgium became independent in 1830 after the Belgian Revolution. The constitution of Belgium was officially proclaimed by the first Belgian parliament by means of the Belgian Constitutional Act. Belgium's legal system was exclusively in French. The majority of sources were from the constitution of the United Kingdom of the Netherlands or copied from French texts. The new constitution of Belgium was not significantly different from these original sources. Thus, some Belgian lawyers have claimed that "the 1831 constitution cannot be seen as the product of a 'Belgian' legal tradition". The Belgian constitutional law enacted in 1830 mainly included the fundamental rights of the population. The constitution can only be amended by first dissolving the existing Parliament and electing new members. Amendments require the assent of two-thirds of the members of both houses of Parliament who are present at their respective sitting (the Chamber and the Senate).

== Source of law ==
Among three major sources of law, which are legislation, customary law and general principles of law, the primary source of law in Belgium is legislation. The two persuasive sources of law which are case-law and academic writing are lesser than the three primary sources of law as Belgium does not provide the system of legal precedents. Belgium's legal system also reflects European Union law and the European Convention on Human Rights. Belgium constitutes a single subject of international law. Thus, the regions and communities in Belgium cooperate when “concluding treaties or representing Belgium in international organizations”. The international law increased power since the constitution of Belgium and involves many provisions which directly influence public lives.

== Civil law ==
Belgium is a federal state with a civil law system. Civil law system in Belgium is inspired by Roman Law and largely influenced by the French legal system particularly by French Civil Code in 1804. This system differentiates with the common law system applied in other countries by making distinction between ‘public’ and ‘private’ law. The public law in Belgium focuses on the cases concerning states, while the private law takes charge of the individual cases among citizens. The Civil code in Belgium is divided into three parts, the first dealing with persons, the second with property, and the third with different modes of acquiring property. The National Registry (Registres d’Etat Civil or Etat Civil) of Belgium has existed since the adoption of the Code Napoleon. The registers were kept in every individual village in Belgium, with the recording of all persons born in the village. The legal process held in the village was also recorded, such as marriage and decease. The National Registry was not only applied to Belgium citizens, but also to the foreigners who stayed in Belgium for at least 2 weeks. The recorded legal documents are only deleted or altered through the order of the Court.

== Commercial law ==
Commercial law of Belgium is a collection of judicial rules governing matters arising out of commercial dealings. Commercial law mainly covers legal cases between transactions on commerce, trade and merchandise. Majority of the commercial legislations are based on code of commerce which is formed under Napoleon in 1795. The first legislation on commerce in Belgium was formed when the common law was found to be insufficient to deal with all the ramifications of commercial dealings and local customs. With the growing need for commercial law, different sets of trade customs were compiled into written codes. The three principal books are “The Consulate of the Sea”, “The Judgements and Customs of Orleon” and “The Maritime Law of Wisby”.

== The Belgium codes ==
The laws in Belgium are codified. Most of them are based on the civil laws from the code Napoleon, which has been modified to suit the spirit of modern times and customs of the country, and adapted from French. They have been adjusted in accordance with the Belgian laws. Large databases among the codes have more than thousands of laws. There are five major codes, which are Code civil (The Civil Code), Code de commerce (The Commercial Code), Code penal (The Criminal Code), Code d'instruction criminelle (Code of Criminal Procedure) and the Code judiciaire (Judicial Code). Other than the five major codes, a variety of special codes related to military objects, patents, railways, shipping, etc. In Belgium, a jurisprudence administered by the courts exists in order to interpret the law, but no jurisprudence can prevail against an article of the code. A judgement is never quoted before Belgian Court with the object of requiring the Court to state that such judgement should be considered as the law of the land, but it may be quoted simply as a basis for interpreting or explaining a law. Belgium carries out the codification in constant until today.

== Courts in Belgium ==
=== Type of courts ===
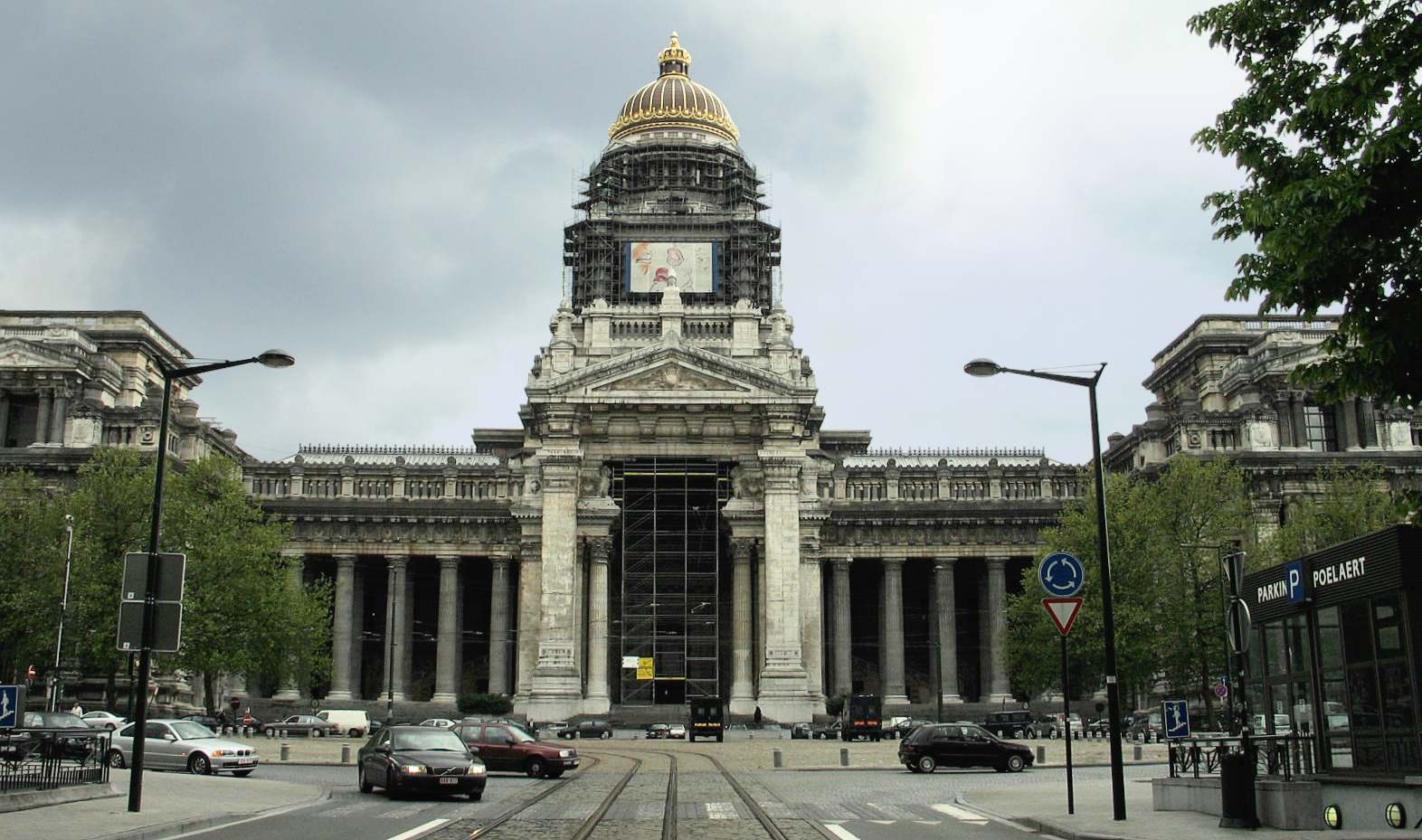
Law Courts of Brussels

The courts in Belgium are organized in a hierarchy. Belgium is divided into five main judicial areas, which are Brussels, Liège, Ghent, Mons, and Antwerp. These areas are separated to twenty-six judicial districts and further separated to 209 judicial cantons. Among the five judicial areas, Brussels, Liege and Ghent belong to courts of appeal. The highest court is the Court of Cassation. The Court of Cassation is the supreme judicial court and the head of all judicial courts in Belgium. It has jurisdiction to overturn judgments and orders which are final in their nature for defect as being contrary to law, and the right to transfer actions and suits from one court to another. The chief courts are The Civil and Criminal Courts and The Commercial Courts. There are also special courts, which are The Assize Court, The Military Court, Workmen’s Court and The Juvenile Court. Other than these courts there are two more courts in Belgium. They are the Conseil d'Etat (Council of State) and the Cour Constitutionnelle (Constitutional Court). Both of these two courts have an obligation to monitor and administer other courts. To be specific, the Council of state is a court which is in charge of monitoring the administration in the courts. The applications from the public concerning the misjudgment of administrative organization are sent to the Council of state for examination. In the Constitutional court, the acts and ordinances of Belgium law are considered. Also, the exercise of power by public authority is supervised by the Constitutional court.

=== Court structure ===
The court structure of Belgium follows the French system due to French influence. The designation of type of courts for all cases are determined by the severity and size of the offence. When the sort of court with purview has been resolved, the case will be assigned to places to be considered. There is one difference with the court system of France in Belgium, which is usage of language in the court. All the procedures held in the courts in Belgium depend on the location of the court, some use Dutch and some use French. There are also places which use both Dutch and French, typically Brussels.

== See also ==
- Divorce in Belgium
- Prostitution in Belgium
