= Grounds for divorce =

Regulations specifying the circumstances under which a person will be granted a divorce

Grounds for divorce are regulations specifying the circumstances under which a person will be granted a divorce. Adultery is the most common grounds for divorce. However, there are countries that view male adultery differently than female adultery as grounds for divorce.

Before decisions on divorce are considered, one might check into state laws and country laws for legal divorce or separation as each culture has stipulations for divorce.

Cruel and inhuman treatment constitute as grounds for divorce. In a proper defense, acceptable differences enable the defendant to have the ability to arrange grounds for divorce.

Some examples for grounds for divorce are:

- Adultery
- Alcoholism
- Disability
- Abandonment (legal)
- Imprisonment
- Domestic violence (Including physical, sexual, or mental abuse of the other spouse and/or the child/children of the couple.)

The spouse that is responsible for committing these allegations is required to confirm the correct date and place that the allegations were committed. The reason for the spouse to confirm the allegations is to show proof that the allegations have taken place in the same state. The state then has to have the authority to administer justice by hearing and determining the controversies. Different states accept different grounds for divorce. For example, some states only accept no-fault divorce where other states accept both fault and no-fault grounds for divorce.

== United States ==
In the United States, each state has distinctive reference names for grounds for divorce.

All states recognize some form of no fault divorce. A no fault divorce can be granted on grounds such as irretrievable breakdown of the marriage, irreconcilable differences, incompatibility, or after a period of separation, depending on the state. Neither party is held responsible for the failure of the marriage. On the other hand, in at fault divorces, one party is asking for a divorce because they claim the other party did something wrong that justifies ending the marriage. Grounds for at fault divorce include adultery, cruelty, abandonment, and criminal conviction.

== Worldwide view ==
Many countries around the world, including the United States, require grounds for divorce.

In some Native American societies, adultery is grounds, but other considerations are factored into the divorce equation. Those factors, such as laziness, being stingy or temperamental, are considered important for divorce decisions.

A frequent issue in family law relates to what situations create grounds for divorce. Recently, more and more countries and states have come to not require fault from either party for a marriage to be dissolved. Several legal systems do not want to eliminate fault completely and reserve it in limited situations.

Western countries have adopted various types of divorce laws. Some countries, such as Switzerland and Germany, no longer require fault to dissolve marriages. In Germany, a divorce is granted if the marriage has broken down. It is assumed that the marriage has broken down if the parties have been living apart for one year and both apply for divorce or if the respondent consents to the divorce. After a separation period of three years, it is assumed that the marriage has broken down, regardless of the positions taken by either party in the proceedings.

In China, divorce considerations for children, such as custody and their support, as well as property, are considered for divorce. Nevertheless, it has been recognized for over 1500 years. Chinese ancient law consisted of three types of divorce that were recognized: 1) Mutual consent; 2) repudiation of "seven grounds for men and three grounds for women"; 3) "intolerable acts against principles of conjugality." In 1981, the Chinese marriage law considered a different basis for marriage in order to prevent a divorce. Marriage had to be based on love, understanding, and mutual respect. With this law, the Chinese government feels the people will be loyal to the nation.

In some religions, men can, or could, repudiate their wives without cause.

== See also ==
- Grounds for divorce (United States law)
- Divorce in Belgium
- Divorce in Norway
- Divorce law in Sweden
