= Zelder paradox =

In economics, the Zelder paradox is the observation of Martin Zelder that welfare-reducing divorce is more likely when a couple has invested their efforts into love and children instead of money, possessions, and sex. Divorce is considered to be welfare-reducing when one spouse's desire to remain married is greater than the other spouse's desire to obtain a divorce. In this situation, a divorce will decrease the combined well-being of the couple, and so could be considered destructive of overall welfare.

== Bargaining in marriage ==
If one spouse values a marriage more than the other spouse values a divorce, then (as suggested by the Coase Theorem) it would be expected that the spouse who wants to stay married would offer the other a greater share of whatever marital goods exist. This offer would be large enough to ensure that both spouses prefer marriage to divorce. In order to be applicable, however, the Coase Theorem requires frictionless trading between parties. In marriage, some goods are difficult to trade. An example is so called marital public goods, which are produced within a marriage and benefit both members of the couple, but also have the characteristic that one spouse cannot exclude the other from enjoying it. If one spouse cannot exclude the other from enjoying a good, then that spouse cannot threaten to withhold or increase production of it, and so the good cannot be used in marital bargaining. If a significant portion of marital wealth is in the form of public goods, then bargaining may not be able to save a marriage, even though a divorce would cause greater overall unhappiness than remaining married. Zelder cites Gary Becker as one of the originators of the idea of using economic tools to analyze bargaining in marriage and the potential for marital public goods to cause inefficiency

== Children and love as marital public goods ==
One type of marital public good is the enjoyment of children. If both spouses care about the welfare of their children, then a happy child will benefit both parents, and neither spouse can prevent the other from enjoying this benefit. Some of the benefits associated with children are private, e.g., time spent with a child by one spouse while the other spouse is excluded. If spouses’ love for each other is largely a public good (within the marriage), then it also cannot be used to bargain to save a marriage.

== The paradox ==
Zelder describes two aspects to the paradox. First, marriages may end in divorce even when the combined welfare of the couple would suffer from divorce. Second, the more effort a couple puts into those activities usually considered most central to marriage, such as love and the raising of children, the more likely it is that a sub-optimal divorce will occur. It seems odd that the likelihood of this outcome would be higher when a marriage is based on love and children rather than more prosaic matters such as money, sex, or household tasks. The key factor described by Zelder is that when the benefits of marriage are non-public, such as time spent on household chores, sex, or income transfers, then spouses can withhold them or offer to increase them in order to save a marriage. Public goods, however, cannot be withheld, and so cannot be used for bargaining.

== Evidence ==
Zelder finds evidence supporting the Zelder paradox in higher divorce rates for couples with children in states with no-fault divorce laws. All 50 U.S. states now have no-fault divorce., but during the 1970s divorce laws differed significantly by state. (In a fault divorce regime, the presence of marital public goods has no effect on the likelihood of divorce, because spousal bargaining is occurring within divorce, not marriage.) In a no-fault regime, if only one spouse wishes to preserve a marriage, that spouse needs private gains (which can be transferred to the other) to succeed, and if a large fraction of marital assets are public goods, such bargaining will be impossible. Zelder (1993) found evidence that couples whose gains to marriage came disproportionately from children were more likely to divorce once the state they lived in switched to no-fault.

== Influence and reactions ==
Zelder's work describing the Zelder Paradox has been cited in over 30 peer-reviewed publications according to the Web of Science, with citations in the fields of economics, law, and public policy. The counter-intuitive nature of the Zelder Paradox is discussed in Ellman (1997). Ellman suggests that wives' advantage in the granting of child custody after divorce may reduce husbands' motivation for divorce, offsetting the effect identified by Zelder. Zelder argues that no-fault divorce was often accompanied by movement toward joint custody instead of exclusive custody by the mother, and that this movement makes it more difficult for a mother to threaten a husband with complete loss of parental rights after a divorce. Ellman also suggests that statistical corrections might eliminate the statistical significance of Zelder's empirical results, but offers no contradictory empirical results.
