= Divorce in Poland =

Divorce in Poland occurs at a rate slightly below that of the average for Europe. In the Polish legal system, divorce proceedings fall within the exclusive jurisdiction of the civil court; there is no legal basis for resolving a marriage through the agreement of the spouses or through administrative procedures. Divorce requests are assessed by the court, in accordance with the positive and negative prerequisites set in the relevant law.

== Law ==
In order for a divorce to be granted there is a need of the satisfaction of the positive prerequisite (the presence of the ground for divorce) and of the negative prerequisite (the absence of conditions which prohibit the granting of the divorce). Current divorce in Poland is regulated by Polish law divorce is regulated by the statute of February 25, 1964: The Polish Family and Guardianship Code, which came into force on January 1, 1965. The statute is divided into three parts (titles), the first of which concerns matrimonial matters of marriage. The law also updated in 1999 to include legal separation.

== Grounds for divorce ==
There is one single ground of divorce, namely "the irretrievable and complete disintegration of matrimonial life" (Article 56 (1) of the Polish Family and Guardianship Code). The disintegration of matrimonial life belongs to the category of legal concepts for which it must be assumed from the outset that a strict statutory definition is not possible. The task of defining this concept falls to case law and legal literature. All attempts to define this concept start with defining the concept of shared matrimonial life. Shared life, as understood in Article 23 of the Family and Guardianship Code, consists of the spiritual, physical, and economic bond between spouses, which is the purpose of marriage and enables the fulfillment of its basic tasks. Usually, a lack of any spiritual, physical and economic bonds between the spouses is necessary in order to prove the ground of divorce, although the Supreme Court has ruled that part of the economic bond may still remain (for example if the spouses live in the same home, although their matrimonial life is otherwise disintegrated). The existence of the ground for divorce is essential - if it is not proven, then the divorce cannot be granted. The finding that the marital breakdown has reached a state allowing it to be described as permanent and complete is a necessary condition for a divorce judgment (Article 56 (1) of the Family and Guardianship Code). The durability and completeness of the breakdown are positive conditions for divorce that are interrelated. Pursuant to the judgment of the Supreme Court of 10 January 1997, II CKN 54/96: "Generally, when assessing the permanence of the breakdown of the spouses' relationship, which is the decisive condition for divorce, the long-lasting nature of the breakdown is taken into account. However, the circumstances of the case may provide other justification for determining that the breakdown of the relationship is permanent and that there is no basis to expect the spouses to reconcile."

== The negative prerequisites ==
If the ground above is proven, the court assesses ex-officio (of its own motion) whether there are any of the conditions which prohibit the granting of the divorce. If any of them are present, the divorce cannot be granted, even if the ground for divorce has been proven. The negative prerequisites are (Articles 56 (2) and 56 (3) of Polish Family and Guardianship Code):

- the divorce would be detrimental to the welfare of the common minor children of the spouses
- the divorce would be contrary to the principles of social norms
- the divorce is requested by the spouse who is solely guilty for the disintegration of matrimonial life, unless
  - the other spouse consents to the divorce, or
  - the refusal of the other spouse to consent to the divorce is contrary to social norms (e.g. is done only due to revenge)

== Fault ==
The divorce law is fault-based. The court rules ex-officio on who is at fault for the divorce, unless the spouses request otherwise.

Determining the causes of the breakdown of marital relations is necessary for determining which spouse is at fault for the breakdown of the marriage. According to the judgment of the Supreme Court of 4 October 2001, I CKN 871/00: "The determination of the spouse's fault in the breakdown of the marriage in the divorce judgment is not a consequence of a specific assessment of evidence, but a legal conclusion drawn from established facts, expressing at the same time a negative assessment of the spouse's conduct that led to the breakdown."

The court may rule that one spouse is guilty, that both spouses are guilty, or that neither spouse is guilty. Being solely at fault has two ramifications: firstly, the sole guilty party cannot be granted a divorce without the consent of the innocent spouse (unless the innocent spouse withholds consent for reasons contrary to social norms); and secondly, the guilty party can be ordered to pay alimony (Article 57 (1) and 57 (2) of the Polish Family and Guardianship Code).

It is presumed that those exercising their rights do so in accordance with the principles of social coexistence. Refusing consent to divorce by the innocent spouse is their right, and therefore it is presumed that by exercising this right, they do so in accordance with the principles of social coexistence. Only the existence of exceptional circumstances can rebut this presumption. The burden of proof rests on the spouse solely guilty to demonstrate that the other spouse, by refusing consent to divorce, violates the principles of social coexistence, i.e., behaves in a way that, when applying an objective criterion, can be deemed morally reprehensible. According to the judgment of the Supreme Court of 4 October 2001, I CKN 871/00: "The assessment of whether the spouse's refusal to consent to divorce constitutes an abuse of rights should also take into account the living conditions of both spouses resulting from the breakdown of the marital relationship." Pursuant to the judgment of the Supreme Court of 21 November 2002, III CKN 665/00: "Refusal to consent to divorce, which serves only the desire to assert dominance over the spouse seeking divorce and hinder their personal life (Article 56 § 3 of the Family and Guardianship Code), does not deserve approval."

== Children in divorce ==
If spouses have common minor children, during the divorce process in Poland court is obliged to decide about issues related those children. According to art 58 of Polish Family and Guardianship Code in the divorce decree court obligatory decides about parental authority over children, children’s place of residence, maintenance for children and contacts with them. Only on spouses’ joint request the court does not rule on contacts with children. To regulate children matters amicably it is possible to conclude by spouses a private parental agreement and file it at court for judge’s consideration.

== Length of Divorce Process ==
Regional courts in Poland usually can take 6 months to 2 years (depending on the region) to complete the divorce process after a divorce petition is filed. In case of dispute and appeal against the divorce ruling, approximately 1 additional year shall be added for the such process.
