= Divorce law in Sweden =

Legal
- Marriage Code 1987; Chapter 5

Parties Involved
- Heterosexual marriage couples Same-sex marriage couples

Related Statistics
- Crude Divorce Rate 2009: 2.4; Mean Duration of Marriage to Divorce 2008: 11.5yrs No. of Divorces 2010: 23,536; No. of One Parent Families 2010: 25,9754; No. of Children with Female Single Parent 2010: 78.5%

Divorce Age of Men in Sweden 2010
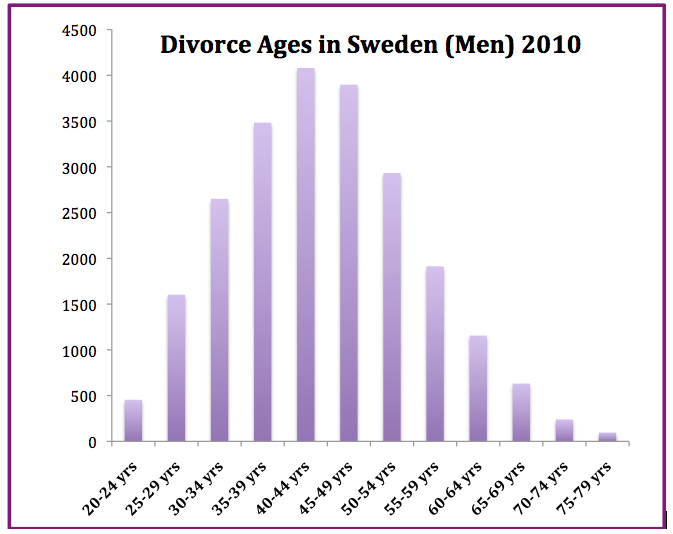

Divorce Age of Women in Sweden 2010
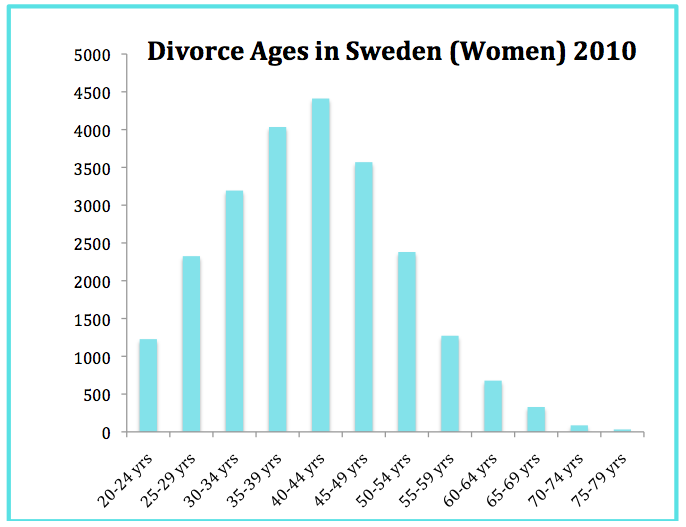

Divorce Rates Trend in Sweden 2000-2010
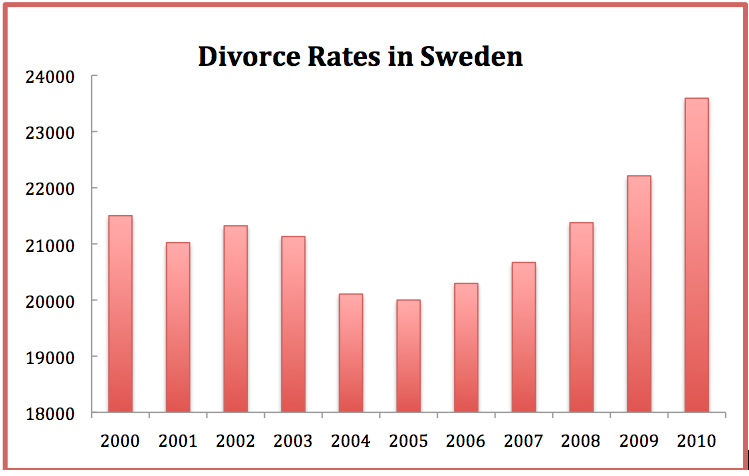

Related Legislations and Policies
- Parents and Children Code 1949; Cohabitants Act 2003; Registered Partnership Act (1994:1117); Private International Law; Foreign Laws; Property Law; Chapter 5: Divorce; Chapter 6: Maintenance; Chapter 7: The property of spouses Chapter 14: Matrimonial cases and Maintenance cases

Divorce law in Sweden concerns the dissolution of marriage, child support, alimony, custody and the division of property. Divorce restores the status of married people to individuals, leaving them free to remarry. The divorce laws in Sweden are known to be considerably liberal compared to other jurisdictions.

== History ==
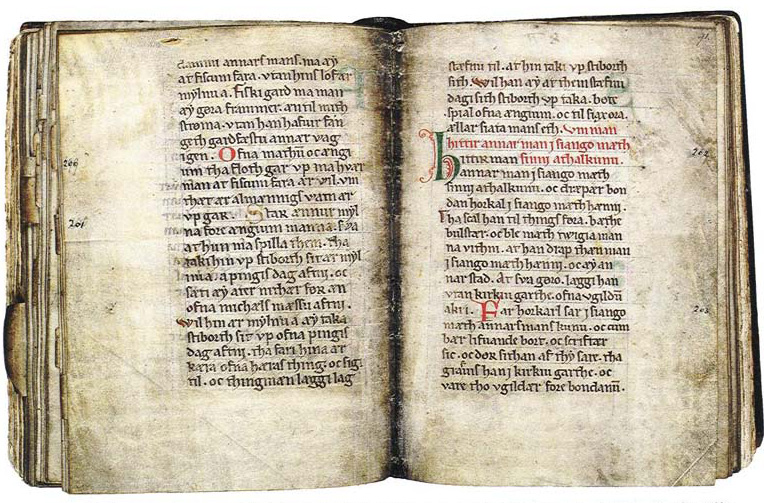
The oldest known vernacular manuscript with the Scanian Law (Royal Library Stockholm, Sweden).

The Swedish have in place a civil law system mostly dependent on statutory law. The German-Roman tradition of the European continental countries has influenced the development of Swedish law. The first comprehensive Swedish Code, consisting of all its codified laws, was the Civil Code of 1734, and is divided into the following Books:

- The Book of Marriage
- The Book of Parents (since 1950)
- The Book of Inheritance
- The Book of Land
- The Book of Building
- The Book of Commerce
- The Book of Crimes
- The Book of Judicial Procedure
- The Book of execution of Judgments

=== Law in the 17th century ===
The law dating from the 17th Century only allowed two grounds for a divorce – adultery and desertion. These were generally in line with the Christianity beliefs and the principle of guilt that influenced the Swedish. In the early 19th Century, simulated desertion was not unusual for couples who wanted to get divorced quickly. One spouse would leave the country (as Copenhagen was the nearest foreign town, many went there) and the remaining spouse would file for divorce on grounds of desertion. The fact of desertion would be confirmed by the party who left the country.

=== Reform: the 1915 Act on the Celebration and Dissolution of Marriage ===
Towards the late 19th Century, three Scandinavian countries: Sweden, Norway and Denmark, wanted to cooperate in legislative reform. The rationale was to provide equal treatment for Scandinavian citizens moving from one Scandinavian country to another. In 1909, an Intergovernmental Committee was set up to prepare a common basis for reformation of family laws. The committee was made up of delegates, experts and lawyers from the three countries.

In 1915, Sweden passed the Act on Celebration and Dissolution of Marriage. Under this Act, married couples could opt for a no-fault, mutual agreement to divorce. The divorce had to be based on ‘deep and permanent breakdown of the marriage’. Often, a joint application by the spouses is indicative of the ‘breakdown of the marriage’.

The spouses were obliged to see a marriage counsellor before such an application was made. A judicial decree of separation would then be issued, requiring both spouses to be entirely apart for a year, before each party had the right to apply for divorce. The Act also allowed an immediate divorce in cases where one party was at fault. Such fault-based cases included chronic alcoholism, battering or contraction of a venereal disease.

Under the reformed law on divorce, women enjoyed enhanced economic positions and equal authority in the household.

=== Further reforms ===
In 1973, the law did not require mutual agreement between the spouses for a divorce. It was sufficient that one spouse wanted a divorce. This made it even easier for spouses to get divorced. Only in certain cases was there a reconsideration period of six months. These were later transferred to the new Marriage Code (Chapter 5) in 1987 and still apply in Sweden today.

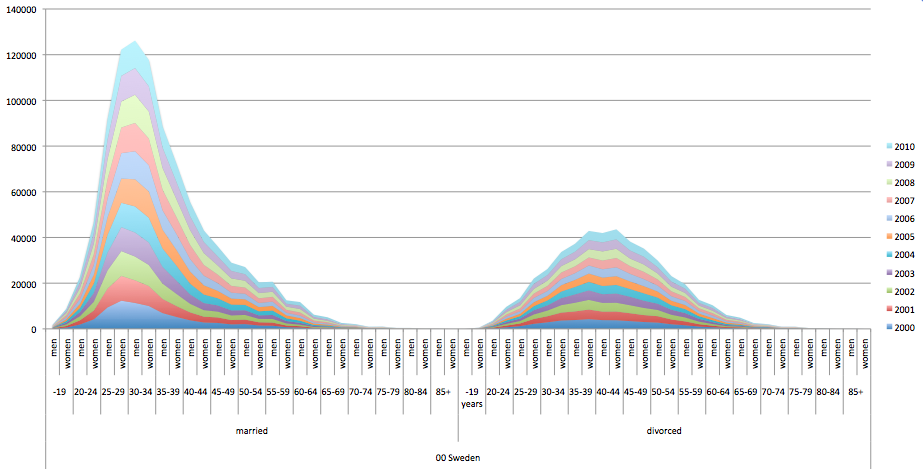
Divorce Statistics in Sweden 2010

== Sources of divorce laws ==
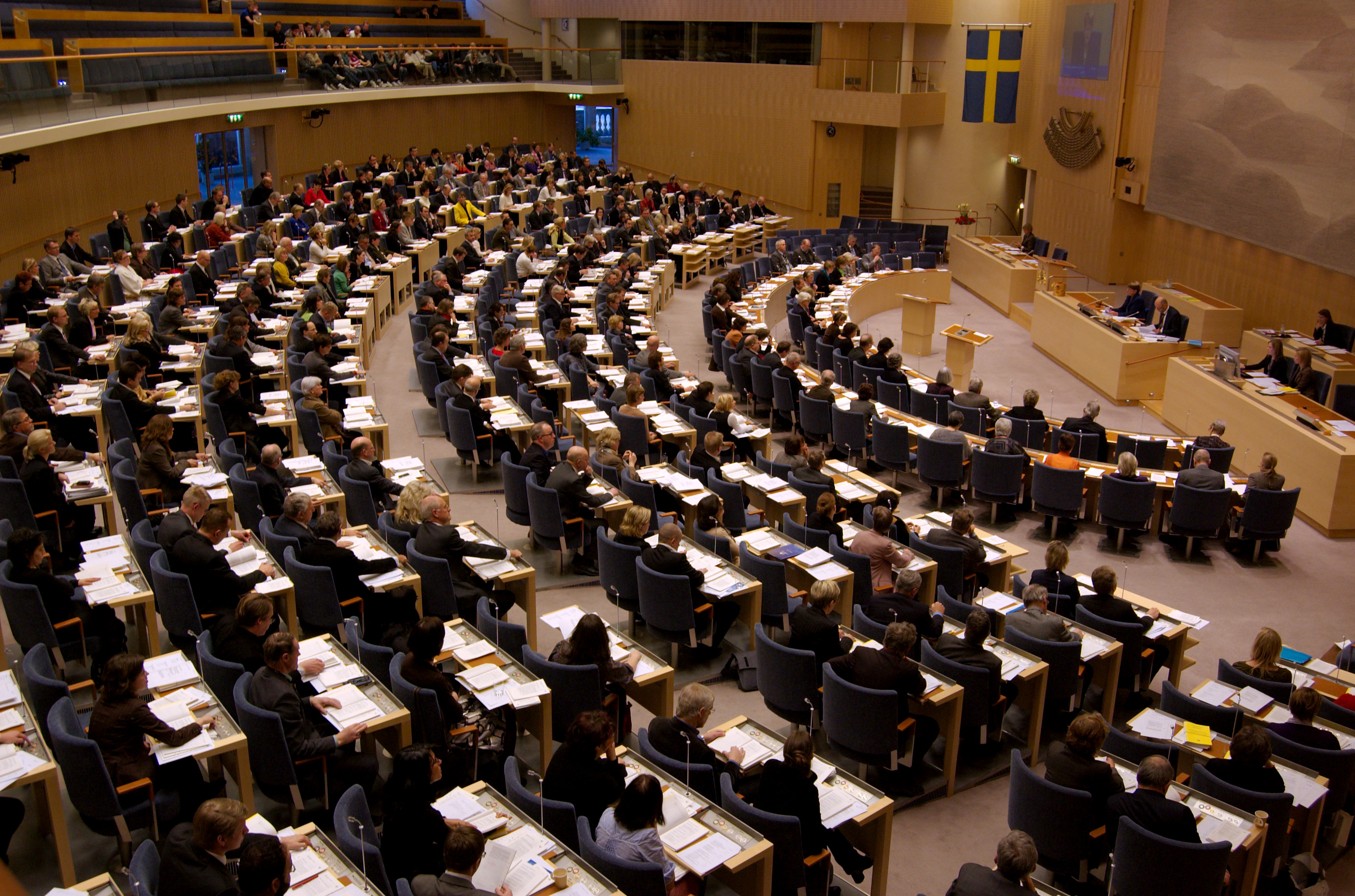
Riksdag is the parliament of Sweden

=== The Marriage Code ===
Divorce is governed by the Marriage Code of 1987. Chapter 5 of the Code provides for the grounds of divorce. The laws regarding maintenance of spouses after divorce are set out in Chapter 6. Procedures for divorce come under Chapter 14. Other provisions regarding the child custody and child maintenance are set out in the Children and Parents Code.

=== Other sources of divorce law ===
Apart from the Marriage Code, preparatory legislative materials are also used as a source of law in Sweden. These materials include government bills and reports by the parliament's committee. For divorce in particular, the Bill on the revision of the old Marriage Code is one of the key preparatory materials used in interpreting divorce laws.

== Obtaining a divorce ==
Divorce proceedings can be initiated by a joint application by the spouses, or by the application for a summons by one of the spouses. Family counseling is encouraged but not compulsory. If spouses agree to the divorce, no lawyers are needed. Any disputes arising will be resolved at the District Court. In the main hearing, one legally qualified judge and three lay judges will preside. At the end of the dispute, each party will normally be expected to bear his or her own legal costs.

=== Applying for a divorce ===
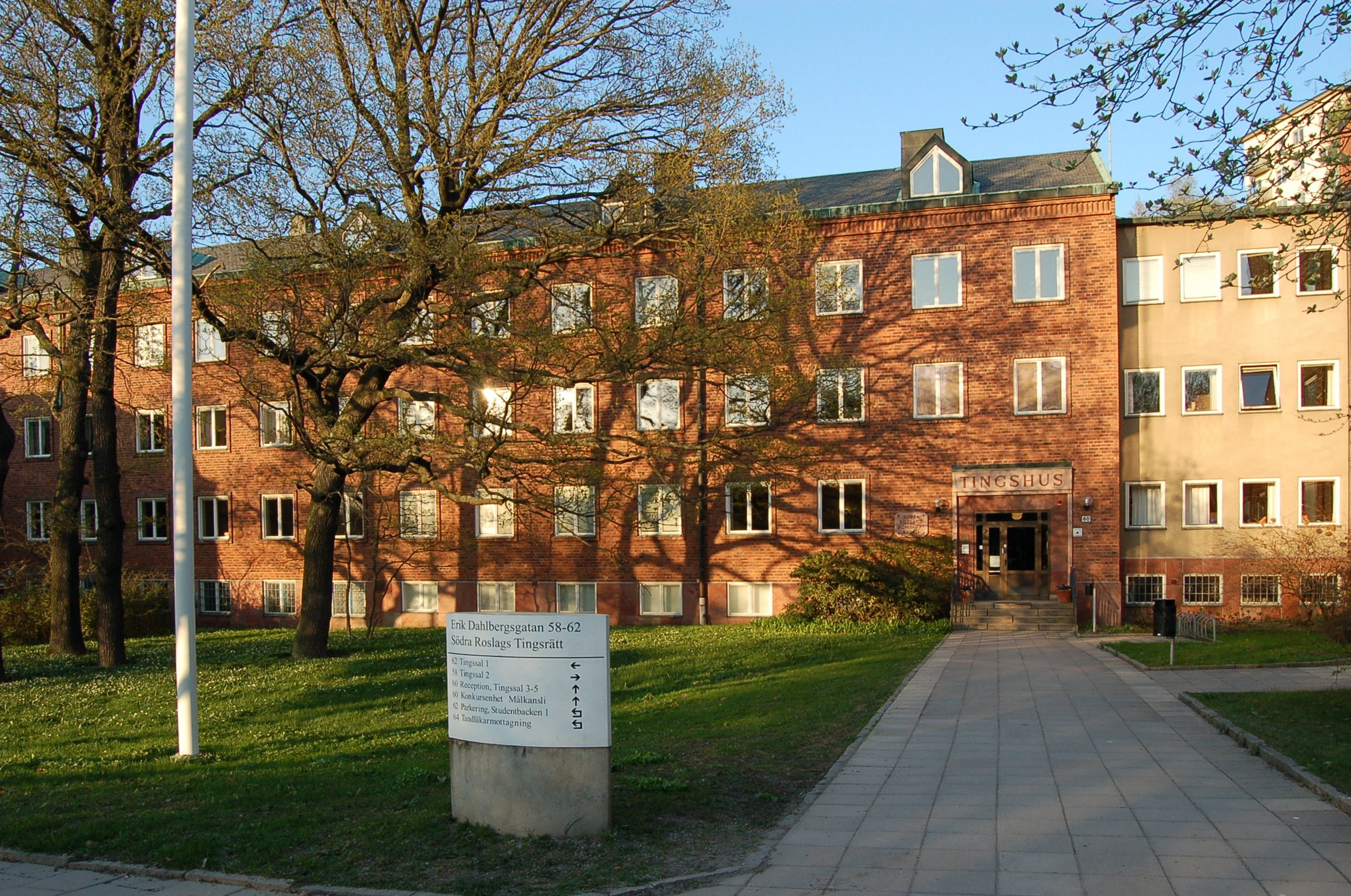
1 of the 53 Tingsrätt (district courts) in Sweden.

Generally, an application of divorce involves submitting the population registration certificates of both parties, together with the payment of an application fee of 450 krona. Additionally, a standard form must be completed and filed to the District Court where one of the partners is domiciled. Domicile in this context means the place where one was registered for population purposes. Where neither of the partners is domiciled in Sweden, the application must be made to Stockholm District Court. Complications usually arise where spouses of different nationalities are involved. In such instances, there are special rules that will dictate when a Swedish court is competent to deal with the applications for divorce.

When an application for divorce has been submitted, a notice from the District Court will be issued. This notice will state the date on which the time for reconsideration begins, the earliest and latest dates on which the parties can proceed with the application and the case number given by the district court.

Proceeding with the application means that the parties have confirmed their intention to divorce. To do so, party or parties to the divorce must notify the district court. This notice can be drafted on an ordinary sheet of paper. On the paper, the case number must be quoted and the spouse or spouses must expressly state that they still want a divorce. New personal identity certificate for both parties must then be submitted. If neither of the parties proceeds with the application within a year from the start of the time for reconsideration, the case will be removed from the district court lists and the parties then remain married to each other.

=== Grounds for divorce ===
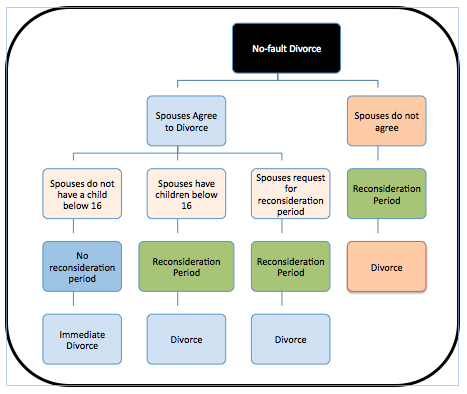
Reconsideration Period

Under marriage laws in Sweden, a divorce does not require any showing of fault or wrongdoing by either party as a ground for divorce. So long as the spouses agree to dissolve their marriage, they would be entitled to a divorce. This practice is commonly known as no-fault divorce.

=== Reconsideration periods ===
A legal separation period is not a preliminary requirement under Swedish law. However, both parties will go through a reconsideration period under two scenarios: firstly, if both parties request for a reconsideration period. Secondly, they have a child below the age of 16.

If one spouse does not consent to the divorce, a reconsideration of 6 months will follow before the divorce.

If the spouses have been living separately for two years, no reconsideration period is required and divorce can take place immediately.

Under special circumstances where marriage was entered into despite the fact that the spouses are related to each other, no reconsideration period is required before a divorce. Similarly, in an event of bigamy, either party from the earlier marriage is entitled to an immediate divorce.

== Maintenance ==
There are two forms of maintenance - spouse maintenance and maintenance for children.

=== Maintenance for spouse ===
The fundamental idea is that divorce effectively severs all forms of economic relations between spouses. Each spouse is therefore individually responsible for his or her own financial support after divorce. Maintenance is seldom granted except in certain circumstances. It must be shown that the spouse is financially needy and that the marriage has resulted in the need for maintenance.

Maintenance is given when a spouse has difficulty in supporting himself or herself for a transitional period following the divorce. Such transitional maintenance provides the needy spouse with opportunities to seek gainful employment or retraining. The sum is determined by considering the spouse's ability to pay, as well as several other factors.

Spousal maintenance is also granted in cases involving marriages of long duration where the spouse becomes financially needy following the separation. This form of maintenance extends over the transitional period and the exact duration is determined upon the relevant facts of each case.

=== Maintenance for children ===
Maintenance for children is compulsory and the sum is to be determined either by an agreement or by a court decision. When assessing the sum, consideration is given to the financial ability of the spouse paying. If the spouse does not pay anything or gives below the stipulated sum, child support is provided by the Swedish Social Insurance Agency. The spouse is then required to reimburse the agency for all or part of the sums paid for towards the child.

== Division of assets ==
Property owned by spouses in marriage can be labelled as either personal or marital property. Upon divorce, only marital property will be divided between spouses.

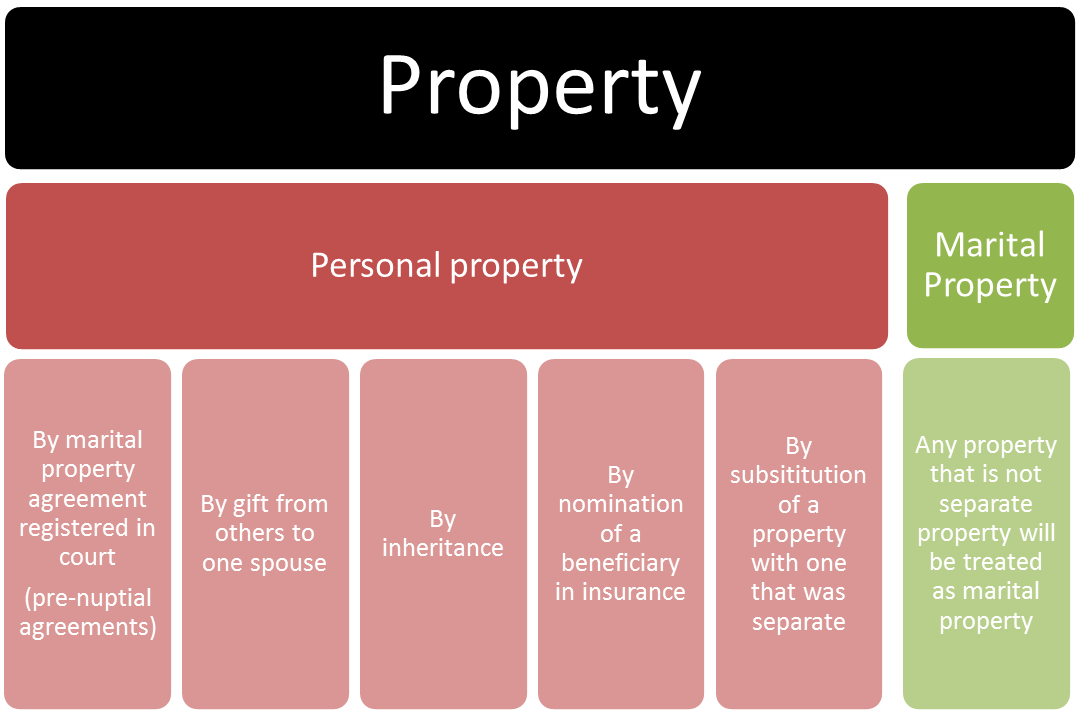
The ways in which property can be classified.

=== Treatment of marital assets ===
As marriage law in Sweden is driven by the principles of individuality and gender equality, a marriage is often viewed as a partnership. Thus, they are encouraged to settle their differences out of court by first negotiating and dividing their assets privately.

Upon negotiation, if the couple is in agreement:

They are to send the division of marital property agreement (original and two copies containing the signatures of two witnesses) and population registration certificates (no older than three months) to the district court where they were registered.

If the couple is in disagreement:

They can apply to the district court for the appointment of a marital property administrator, who will then make a decision regarding what should be included in the division of marital property, how items should be valued and how they should be divided. Generally, spouses are entitled to a 50–50 split of the property. The courts will award the matrimonial home to the needier spouse, after subtracting the value from the amount the spouse was previously entitled to receive.

If one of the spouses is not satisfied with the decision made by the administrator, he or she can appeal to the district court. The courts can override this equal-split rule if a 50–50 split will be unfair. Some factors that may influence the court's decision are the length of marriage and the economic standing of parties.

== Analysis and assessment of current rules ==
=== Opposition to European Union divorce proposal ===
The European Union has been facing strong opposition from Sweden to adopt the enhanced cross-border divorces laws across Europe. The proposal, known as Rome III, will allow spouses of mixed nationality to choose which country's divorce laws could govern their divorce.

Sweden's resistance, however, is due largely to the fear that such a policy would violate the relatively liberal divorce laws in Sweden. In 2006, the Swedish Ministry of Justice published a report warning against such blanket laws. It cited the possibility of European Courts having to apply restrictive divorce laws from non- European Union countries like Iran.

== International comparison ==
=== Grounds for divorce ===
One critical feature that marks Swedish divorce laws is the complete absence of any fault requirement when establishing a case for divorce. Fault is entirely irrelevant and has no legal consequences on the results of the proceedings. Because there is no need to establish an irretrievable breakdown of marriage as the fundamental ground for divorce, the system remains virtually fault-free.

In addition, under the Swedish laws, there is no preliminary requirement of a separation period before a divorce case can be established.

In other jurisdictions such as United Kingdom and Singapore, divorce is granted on the basis of an irretrievable breakdown of marriage. Under current divorce law in England and Wales, a person has to prove in court that the marriage has broken down; there are five reasons for which a marriage can be considered to have broken down: adultery, unreasonable behaviour, desertion after two years, two years' separation with consent or five years' separation without consent.

=== Mediation ===
Another area of distinction is that mediation in Sweden is on a purely voluntary basis. Couples are not legally obliged to undergo mediation as part of the divorce procedure. In direct comparison, the UK legislation requires all couples to undergo a mandatory mediation assessment before they can proceed to court. China's divorce laws also places a strong focus on mediation and courts are generally only utilized when mediation has failed.

=== Pre-nuptial agreements ===
In Sweden, agreements made before marriage are viewed as contracts and generally enforceable. These agreements usually stipulate how assets are to be divided in case of a divorce. Courts in other countries such as United Kingdom and Singapore have historically adopted a more cautious approach towards the enforceability of pre-nuptial agreements. These agreements have been upheld in some cases but the law regarding pre-nuptial agreements in these countries (e.g. Radmacher v Granatino).

== See also ==
- Divorce law around the world
- Judicial system of Sweden
- Sharia
- Enhanced co-operation
- Child support
- Child custody
- Child abduction
- Division of property
- Alimony
