= Januário Lourenço =

Portuguese Jurist (born 1974)

Januário Lourenço (born 29 January 1974) is a Portuguese Jurist who has promoted the first Internet domain seizure on a debt collection lawsuit, and also invented the Electronic Power of Attorney and the Electronic Divorce. Furthermore, was nominated for the Innovative Entrepreneurship Award granted by the President of Portugal and for the 2008 Leader Quest Award granted by the Harvard Club Portugal.
