= Divorce =

Termination of a marital union

Divorce (also known as dissolution of marriage) is the process of terminating a marriage. Divorce usually entails canceling or reorganising the legal duties and responsibilities of marriage according to the law of the particular country or state.

Divorce laws vary considerably around the world, but in most countries, divorce is a legal process that requires the sanction of a court or other authority, which may involve issues of distribution of property, child custody, alimony (spousal support), child visitation / access, parenting time, child support, and division of debt. In most countries, monogamy is required by law, so divorce allows each former partner to marry another person.

Divorce is different from annulment, which declares the marriage null and void, with legal separation or de jure separation (a legal process by which a married couple may formalize a de facto separation while remaining legally married) or with de facto separation (a process where the spouses informally stop cohabiting). Reasons for divorce vary, from sexual incompatibility or lack of independence for one or both spouses to a personality clash or infidelity.

The only countries that do not allow divorce are the Philippines and the Vatican City. In the Philippines, divorce for non-Muslim Filipinos is not legal unless one spouse is an undocumented immigrant and satisfies certain conditions. The Vatican City is a theocratic state ruled by the head of the Catholic Church, and does not allow for divorce. Countries that have relatively recently legalized divorce are Italy (1970), Portugal (1975, although from 1910 to 1940 it was possible both for the civil and religious marriage), Brazil (1977), Spain (1981), Argentina (1987), Paraguay (1991), Colombia (1991; from 1976 was allowed only for non-Catholics), Andorra (1995), Ireland (1996), Chile (2004) and Malta (2011).

== Overview ==
Divorces per 1000 people

Though divorce laws vary between jurisdictions, there are two basic approaches to divorce: fault based and no-fault based. However, even in some jurisdictions that do not require a party to claim fault of their partner, a court may still take into account the behaviour of the parties when dividing property, debts, evaluating custody, shared care arrangements and support. In some jurisdictions, one spouse may be forced to pay the attorney's fees of another spouse.

Grounds for divorce vary widely from country to country. Marriage may be seen as a contract, a status, or a combination of these. Where it is seen as a contract, the refusal or inability of one spouse to perform the obligations stipulated in the contract may constitute a ground for divorce for the other spouse. In contrast, in some countries (such as Sweden, Finland, Australia, New Zealand), divorce is purely no fault, meaning that parties may separate of their own free will without having to prove someone is at fault for the divorce. Many jurisdictions offer both the option of a no fault divorce as well as an at fault divorce. This is the case, for example, in many states of the US, France and the Czech Republic.

Laws vary as to the waiting period before a divorce is effective. Also, residency requirements vary. However, issues of division of property are typically determined by the law of the jurisdiction in which the property is located.

In Europe, divorce laws differ from country to country, reflecting differing legal and cultural traditions. In some countries, particularly (but not only) in some former communist countries, divorce can be obtained only on one single general ground of "irretrievable breakdown of the marriage" (or a similar formulation). Yet, what constitutes such a "breakdown" of the marriage is interpreted very differently from jurisdiction to jurisdiction, ranging from very liberal interpretations (e.g. Netherlands) to quite restrictive ones (e.g., in Poland, there must be an "irretrievable and complete disintegration of matrimonial life", but there are many restrictions to granting a divorce). Separation constitutes a ground of divorce in some European countries (in Germany, e.g., a divorce is granted on the basis of a 1-year separation if both spouses consent, or 3-year separation if only one spouse consents). "Separation" does not necessarily mean separate residences – in some jurisdictions, living in the same household but leading a separate life (e.g., eating, sleeping, socializing, etc. separately) is sufficient to constitute de facto separation; this is explicitly stated, e.g., in the family laws of Latvia or the Czech Republic.

Divorce laws are not static; they often change reflecting evolving social norms of societies. In the 21st century, many European countries have made changes to their divorce laws, in particular by reducing the length of the necessary periods of separation, e.g., Scotland in 2006 (1 or 2 years from the previous 2 or 5 years); France in 2005 (2 years from the previous 6 years), Switzerland in 2005 (2 years from the previous 4 years), Greece in 2008 (2 years from the previous 4 years). Some countries have completely overhauled their divorce laws, such as Spain in 2005, and Portugal in 2008. A new divorce law also came into force in September 2007 in Belgium, creating a new system that is primarily no-fault. Similarly, in the UK, under the new divorce law that came into force in April 2022, the person initiating the divorce process no longer has to blame their spouse for the breakdown of their marriage. Bulgaria also modified its divorce regulations in 2009. Also in Italy, new laws came into force in 2014 and 2015 with significant changes in Italian law in matter of divorce: apart from shortening of the period of obligatory separation (6 months for consensual separations and 1 year for contested ones from the previous 3 years), other forms of getting a divorce are allowed – as an alternative to court proceedings, i.e. the negotiations with the participation of an advocate or agreement made before the registrar of Public Registry Office. Austria by contrast is a European country where the divorce law still remains conservative.

The magisterium of the Roman Catholic Church founds the concept of marriage on natural moral law, elaborated by St. Thomas Aquinas, supplemented by the revealed Divine law. The doctrine developed by Aquinas has been partially shared by the Eastern Orthodox Church in the course of history.

== Law ==
=== Types ===
In some jurisdictions, the courts will seldom apply principles of fault, but might willingly hold a party liable for a breach of a fiduciary duty to his or her spouse. Grounds for divorce differs from jurisdiction to jurisdiction in the worldwide. Some states have no-fault divorce; some states require a declaration of fault on the part of one partner or both; some states allow either method.

In most jurisdictions, a divorce must be certified or ordered by a Judge in a court of law to come into effect. The terms of the divorce are usually determined by the courts, though they may take into account prenuptial agreements or post-nuptial agreements, or ratify terms that the spouses may have agreed to privately, while in other areas, agreements related to the marriage have to be rendered in writing to be enforceable. In the absence of agreement, a contested divorce may be stressful to the spouses.

In some countries, when the spouses agree to divorce and to the terms of the divorce, it can be certified by a non-judiciary administrative entity. The effect of a divorce is that both parties are free to marry again if a filing in an appellate court does not overturn the decision.

==== Contested divorce ====
Contested divorces mean that one of several issues are required to be heard by a judge at trial level—this is more expensive, and the parties will have to pay for a lawyer's time and preparation. In such a divorce the spouses are not able to agree on issues for instance child custody and division of marital assets. In such situations, the litigation process takes longer to conclude. The judge controls the outcome of the case. Less adversarial approaches to divorce settlements have recently emerged, such as mediation and collaborative divorce settlement, which negotiate mutually acceptable resolution to conflicts. This principle in the United States is called 'Alternative Dispute Resolution' and has gained popularity.

==== At-fault divorce ====
Before the late 1960s, nearly all countries that permitted divorce required proof by one party that the other party had committed an act incompatible with the marriage. This was termed "grounds" for divorce (popularly called "fault") and was the only way to terminate a marriage. No-fault divorce is available in Australia, New Zealand, Canada, the United States and other Western countries.

Fault-based divorces can be contested; evaluation of offences may involve allegations of collusion of the parties working together to get the divorce, or condonation by approving the offence, connivance by tricking someone into committing an offence, or provocation by the other party. Contested fault divorces can be expensive, and not usually practical as eventually most divorces are granted. Comparative rectitude is a doctrine used to determine which spouse is more at fault when both spouses are guilty of breaches.

The grounds for a divorce which a party could raise and need to prove included

- desertion
- abandonment (typically 1 year)
- cruelty
- habitual drunkenness
- drug addiction
- adultery

The requirement of proving a ground was revised and withdrawn by the terms of 'no-fault' statutes, which became popular in many Western countries in the late 1960s and early 1970s. In 'no-fault' jurisdictions divorce can be obtained either on a simple allegation of 'irreconcilable differences,' 'irretrievable break-down', or 'incompatibility' with respect to the marriage relationship, or on the ground of de facto separation.

==== Summary divorce ====
A summary or simple divorce, available in some jurisdictions, is used when spouses meet certain eligibility requirements or can agree on key issues beforehand.

Key factors:

- Short duration of marriage (less than five years)
- Absence of children (or, in some jurisdictions, prior allocation of child custody and of child-support direction and amount)
- Absence or minimal value of real property at issue and any associated encumbrances such as mortgages
- Absence of agreed-as-marital property above a given value threshold (around $35,000 not including vehicles)
- Absence, with respect to each spouse, of claims to personal property above a given value threshold, typically the same as that for total marital property, with such claims including claims to exclusive previous ownership of property described by the other spouse as marital

==== No-fault divorce ====
Most Western jurisdictions have a no-fault divorce system, in which a divorce can be granted based only on the assertion by one of the parties that the marriage has broken down irretrievably, without any need for an allegation or proof of fault. The application can be made by either party or by both parties jointly.

In jurisdictions adopting the no-fault principle, some courts may still take fault into account when determining some aspects of the terms of the divorce decree, for example, the division of property and debts and provision of spousal support. Some behaviors that may constitute marital fault, such as violence, cruelty, or substance abuse may also be considered when determining child custody, but child custody judgements are made based on a different fundamental standard: the child's or children's best interests.

==== Uncontested divorce ====
A large percentage of divorce cases are uncontested, meaning that the parties to the divorce are able to come to an agreement about the division of property, custody children, and support issues instead of having those issues decided by a judge. This is also known as mutual consent divorce or mutual divorce. When the parties can agree and present the court with a fair and equitable agreement, approval of the divorce is typically granted. Where the issues are not complex and the parties are cooperative, a settlement often can be directly negotiated between them. If the two parties cannot come to an agreement, they may ask the court to decide how to split property and deal with the custody of their children. Though this may be necessary, the courts would prefer parties to come to an agreement prior to entering court.

In the United States, many state court systems report that a significant number of divorce cases are filed pro se, meaning that the parties to the divorce represent themselves without a lawyer. For example, courts in urban areas of California report that almost 80% of new divorces are filed pro se.

==== Collaborative divorce ====
Collaborative divorce is a method for divorcing couples to come to an agreement on divorce issues. In a collaborative divorce, the parties negotiate an agreed resolution with the assistance of attorneys who are trained in the collaborative divorce process and in mediation and often with the assistance of a neutral financial specialist or divorce coaches. The parties are empowered to make their own decisions based on their own needs and interests, but with complete information and full professional support.

Once the collaborative divorce starts, the lawyers are disqualified from representing the parties in a contested legal proceeding, should the collaborative law process end prematurely. Most attorneys who practise collaborative divorce say that it can be more cost-effective than other divorce methods, e.g., going to court.

==== Electronic divorce ====
Portugal, for example, allows two persons to file an electronic request for no-fault collaborative divorce in a non judiciary administrative entity. In specific cases, with no children, real property, alimony, or common address, can be completed within one hour.

==== Mediated divorce ====
Divorce mediation is an alternative to traditional divorce litigation. In a divorce mediation session, a mediator facilitates the discussion between the two parties by assisting with communication and providing information and suggestions to help resolve differences. At the end of the mediation process, the separating parties have typically developed a tailored divorce agreement that can be submitted to the court. Mediation sessions can include either party's attorneys, a neutral attorney, or an attorney-mediator who can inform both parties of their legal rights, but does not provide advice to either, or can be conducted with the assistance of a facilitative or transformative mediator without attorneys present at all. Some mediation companies, such as Wevorce, also pair clients with counselors, financial planners and other professionals to work through common mediation sticking points. Divorce mediators may be attorneys who have experience in divorce cases, or they may be professional mediators who are not attorneys, but who have training specifically in the area of family court matters. Divorce mediation can be significantly less costly, both financially and emotionally, than litigation. The adherence rate to mediated agreements is much higher than that of adherence to court orders.

== Polygamy and divorce ==
Polygamy is a significant structural factor governing divorce in countries where this is permitted. There is little analysis of the link between marital instability and polygyny that leads to divorce. The frequency of divorce rises in polygynous marriages compared to monogamous relationships. Within polygynous unions, differences in conjugal stability are found to occur by wife order. There are three main mechanisms through which polygyny affects divorce: economic restraint; sexual satisfaction; childlessness. Many women escape economic restraint through divorcing their spouses when they are allowed to initiate a divorce.

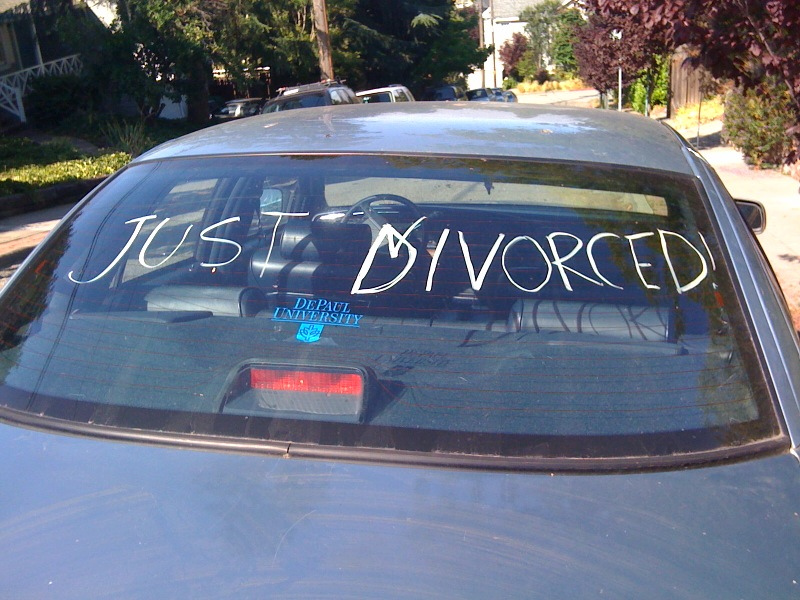
"JUST DIVORCED!" hand-written on an automobile's rear window.

== Religion and divorce ==
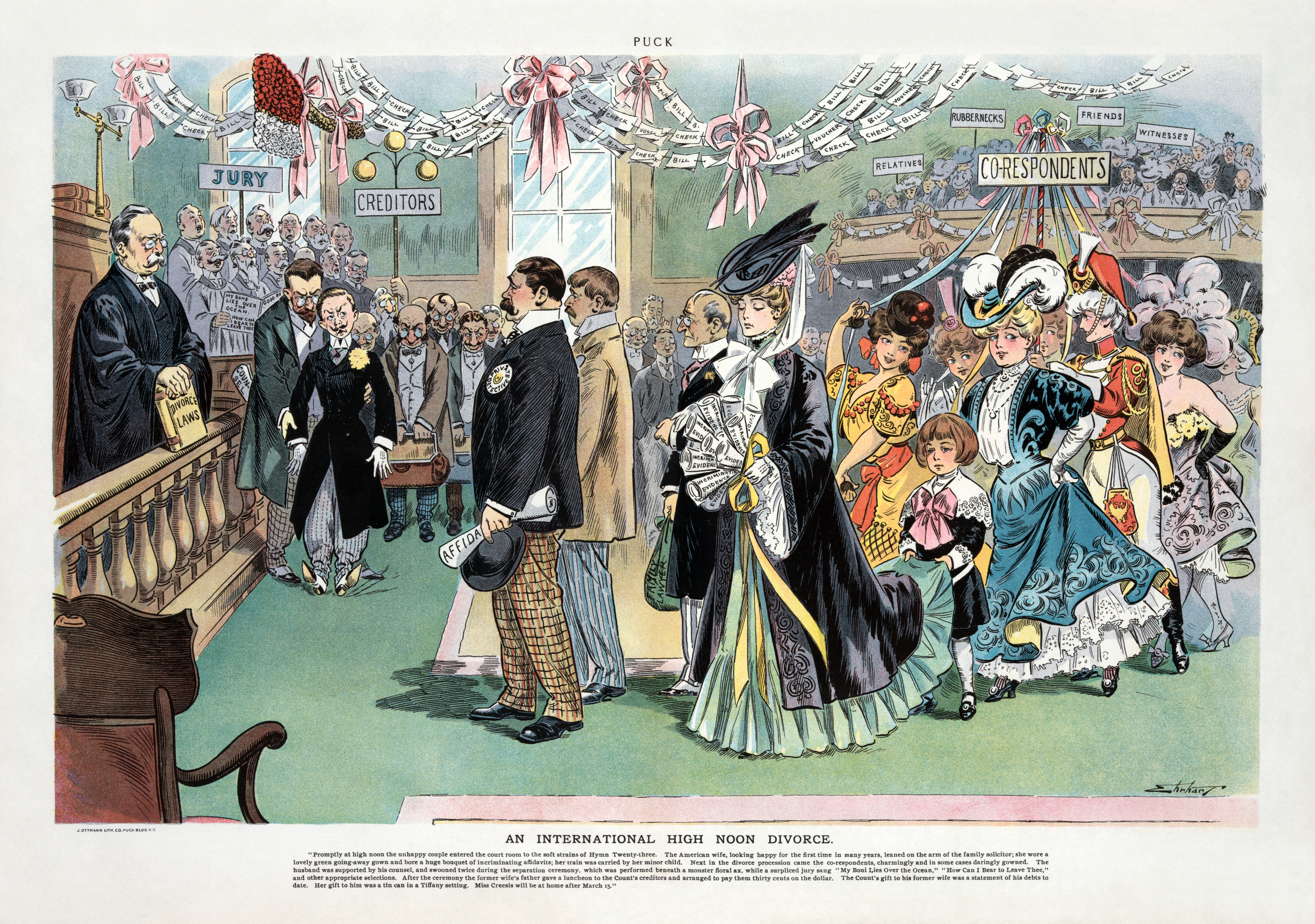
Cartoon parodying the circus-like divorce proceedings of Anna Gould (an American heiress and socialite) and Boni de Castellane (a French nobleman) in 1906 in Paris, France. Boni de Castellane then sought an annulment from the Vatican so that he could be free to remarry in the Church. The annulment case was not finally settled until 1924, when the highest Vatican tribunal upheld the validity of the marriage and denied the annulment.

In some countries (commonly in Europe and North America), the government defines and administers marriages and divorces. While ceremonies may be performed by religious officials on behalf of the state, a civil marriage and thus, civil divorce (without the involvement of a religion) is also possible. Due to differing standards and procedures, a couple can be legally unmarried, married, or divorced by the state's definition, but have a different status as defined by a religious order. Other countries use religious law to administer marriages and divorces, eliminating this distinction. In these cases, religious officials are generally responsible for interpretation and implementation.

Islam allows, yet generally advises against divorce, and it can be initiated by either the husband or the wife.

Christian views on divorce vary: Catholic teaching allows only annulment, while most other denominations discourage it except in the event of adultery.

Jewish views of divorce differ, with Reform Judaism considering civil divorces adequate; Conservative and Orthodox Judaism, on the other hand, require that the husband grant his wife a divorce in the form of a get.

The Millet System, where each religious group regulates its own marriages and divorces, is still present in varying degrees in some post−Ottoman countries including Iraq, Syria, Jordan, Lebanon, Israel, the Palestinian Authority and Egypt. Several countries use sharia (Islamic law) to administer marriages and divorces for Muslims. Thus, Marriage in Israel is administered separately by each religious community (Jews, Christians, Muslims, and Druze), and there is no provision for interfaith marriages other than marrying in another country. For Jews, marriage and divorce are administered by Orthodox rabbis. Partners can file for divorce either in rabbinical court or Israeli civil court.

== Gender and divorce ==
According to a study published in the American Law and Economics Review, women have filed slightly more than two-thirds of divorce cases in the United States. This trend is mirrored in the UK where a recent study into web search behavior found that 70% of divorce inquiries were from women. These findings also correlate with the Office for National Statistics publication "Divorces in England and Wales 2012" which reported that divorce petitions from women outnumber those from men by 2 to 1.

Regarding divorce settlements, according to the 2004 Grant Thornton survey in the UK, women obtained a better or considerably better settlement than men in 60% of cases. In 30% of cases the assets were split 50–50, and in only 10% of cases did men achieve better settlements (down from 24% the previous year). The report concluded that the percentage of shared residence orders would need to increase in order for more equitable financial divisions to become the norm.

Some jurisdictions give unequal rights to men and women when filing for divorce.

For couples following Conservative or Orthodox Jewish law (which by Israeli civil law includes all Jews in Israel), the husband must grant his wife a divorce through a document called a get. Granting the 'get' obligates him to pay the woman a significant sum of money (10,000-$20,000) as stated on the religious prenuptial contract, which can be in addition to whatever prior settlement he had reached as far as continuous child support and funds he had to pay by court order in the civil divorce. If the man refuses (agreeing on condition he will not have to pay the money is still called refusing), the woman can appeal to a court or the community to pressure the husband. A woman whose husband refuses to grant the get or a woman whose husband is missing without sufficient knowledge that he died, called an agunah, is still married, and therefore cannot remarry. Under Orthodox law, children of an extramarital affair involving a married Jewish woman are considered mamzerim and cannot marry non-mamzerim.

== Causes ==
In the western world as a whole, two thirds of divorces are initiated by women. In the United States, 69% of divorces are initiated by women; the cause for this difference is not clear. 66% of all divorces occur in couples without children. An annual study in the UK by management consultants Grant Thornton, estimates the main proximate causes of divorce based on surveys of matrimonial lawyers. The main causes in 2004 were:

- Adultery – 27%
- Family strains (e.g., from the inlaws) – 18%
- Domestic violence – 17%
- Midlife crisis – 13%
- Addictions, e.g. alcoholism and gambling – 6%
- Workaholism – 6%
- Other factors – 13%

According to this survey, husbands engaged in extramarital affairs in 75% of cases, and wives in 25%. In cases of family strain, wives' families were the primary source of strain in 78%, compared to 22% of husbands' families. Emotional and physical abuse were more evenly split, with wives affected in 60% and husbands in 40% of cases. In 70% of workaholism-related divorces it was husbands who were the cause, and in 30%, wives. The 2004 survey found that 93% of divorce cases were petitioned by wives, very few of which were contested. 53% of divorces were marriages that had lasted 10 to 15 years, with 40% ending after 5 to 10 years. The first 5 years are relatively divorce-free, and if a marriage survives more than 20 years it is unlikely to end in divorce.

Social scientists study the causes of divorce in terms of underlying factors that may motivate divorce. One of these factors is the age at which a person gets married; delaying marriage may provide more opportunity or experience in choosing a compatible partner. In India, sociologists have charted various reasons that have led to an increase in divorce rates: urbanization and migration (these have led to weakening of joint family systems; couples have to navigate issues without the support of the extended family); women's economic independence (with reduced financial dependency on the spouse, women choose to leave unhappy or abusive marriages); shift from arranged to love marriages (couples struggle with expectations of both partners and families. While this is not exclusive to love marriages, the percentage of divorce is higher for love marriages in India); social acceptance and reduces stigma; and increased awareness of legal rights.

Wage, income, and sex ratios are other such underlying factors that have been included in analyses by sociologists and economists. Couples with a high household income are less likely to divorce than poor couples.

Other personal factors, such as attending religious services regularly and having at least one child together, also reduce the risk of divorce.

Other factors include the wedding itself: Spending relatively little money on the wedding, but having a relatively high number of guests in attendance (e.g., 50 or more people) and going on a honeymoon trip, is associated with a lower risk of divorce. High-cost weddings may strain marriages by causing debt stress.

=== Cohabitation effect ===
The elevation of divorce rates among couples who cohabited before marriage is called the "cohabitation effect". Evidence suggests that although this correlation is partly due to two forms of selection (a) that persons whose moral or religious codes permit cohabitation are also more likely to consider divorce permitted by morality or religion and (b) that marriage based on low levels of commitment is more common among couples who cohabit than among couples who do not, such that the mean and median levels of commitment at the start of marriage are lower among cohabiting than among non-cohabiting couples), the cohabitation experience itself exerts at least some independent effect on the subsequent marital union.

In 2010, a study by Jay Teachman published in Journal of Marriage and Family found that women who have cohabited or had premarital sex with men other than their husbands have an increased risk of divorce and that this effect is strongest for women who have cohabited with multiple men before marriage. To Teachman, the fact that the elevated risk of divorce is only experienced when the premarital partner(s) is someone other than the husband indicates that premarital sex and cohabitation are now a normal part of the courtship process in the United States. This study only considers data on women in the 1995 National Survey of Family Growth in the United States. Divorce is sometimes caused by one of the partners finding the other unattractive.

Recent studies show that the cohabitation effect on divorce varies across different cultures and periods. Another article published in Journal of Marriage and Family found that when cohabitation was uncommon in pre-reform China, premarital cohabitation increased the likelihood of subsequent divorce, but this association disappeared when cohabitation became prevalent.

=== Serious medical illnesses ===
Women are six times more likely to be separated or divorced soon after a diagnosis of cancer or multiple sclerosis than men. A review found a small decrease of divorce rate associated with most cancer types, but stated methodological weakness for many published studies which studied the association between divorce and cancer.

== Effects ==
Some of the effects associated with divorce include academic, behavioral, and psychological problems. Although this may not always be true, studies suggest that children from divorced families are more likely to exhibit such behavioral issues than non-divorced families.

=== Divorce and relationships ===
Research done at Northern Illinois University on Family and Child Studies suggests that divorce of couples experiencing high conflict can positively affect families by reducing conflict in the home. There are, however, many instances when the parent-child relationship may suffer due to divorce. Financial support is many times lost when an adult goes through a divorce. The adult may be obligated to obtain additional work to maintain financial stability. This can lead to a negative relationship between the parent and child; the relationship may suffer due to a lack of attention towards the child and minimal parental supervision.

Studies have also shown that parental skills decrease after a divorce occurs; however, this effect is only a temporary change. "Many researchers have shown that a disequilibrium, including diminished parenting skills, occurs in the year following the divorce but that by two years after the divorce re-stabilization has occurred and parenting skills have improved."

Some couples choose divorce even when one spouse's desire to remain married is greater than the other spouse's desire to obtain a divorce. In economics, this is known as the Zelder Paradox and is more familiar with marriages that have produced children and less common with childless couples.

Research has also found that recent divorcees report significantly higher hostility levels after the divorce than before, and that this effect applies equally to both male and female divorcees.

In an American Psychological Association study of parents' relocation after a divorce, researchers found that a move has a long-term effect on children. In the first study conducted amongst 2,000 college students on the effects of parental relocation relating to their children's well-being after divorce, researchers found major differences. In divorced families in which one parent moved, the students received less financial support from their parents compared with divorced families in which neither parent moved. These findings also imply other negative outcomes for these students, such as more distress related to the divorce and did not feel a sense of emotional support from their parents. Although the data suggests negative outcomes for these students whose parents relocate after divorce, there is insufficient research that can alone prove the overall well-being of the child A newer study in the Journal of Family Psychology found that parents who move more than an hour away from their children after a divorce are much less well off than those parents who stayed in the same location

=== Effects on children ===
The impact of divorce on children - Tamara D. Afifi at a TED talk

Research has shown that children are greatly affected by the disunion of their parents' marriage. In most cases these effects are displayed in academic strain, difficulty in regulating mood and emotions, and a tendency to find outlets in harmful substances or activities such as drugs, alcohol, and violence.

==== Academic and socioeconomic ====
Frequently, children who have experienced a parental divorce have lower academic achievement than children from non-divorced families. A review of family and school factors related to adolescents' academic performance noted that a child from a divorced family is two times more likely to drop out of high school than a child from a non-divorced family. These children from divorced families may also be less likely to attend college, resulting in the end of their academic career.

Often academic problems are associated with children from single-parent families. Studies have shown that this may be directly related to the economic effect of divorce. A divorce may result in the parent and children moving to an area with a higher poverty rate and a poor education system, because of the financial difficulties of a single parent.

Children of divorced parents also on average achieve lower levels of socioeconomic status, income, and wealth accumulation than children of parents who remain married. These outcomes are associated with lower educational achievement.

Young men or women between the ages of 7 and 16 who had experienced the divorce of their parents were more likely than youths who had not experienced the divorce of their parents to leave home because of friction, to cohabit before marriage, and to parent a child before marriage.

Divorce often leads to worsened academic achievement in children ages 7–12, the most heightened negative effect being reading test scores. These negative effects tend to persist, and even escalate after the divorce or separation occurs.

==== Psychological ====
Divorce is associated with diminished psychological well-being in children and adult offspring of divorced parents, including greater unhappiness, less satisfaction with life, weaker sense of personal control, anxiety, depression, and greater use of mental health services. A preponderance of evidence indicates that there is a causal effect between divorce and these outcomes.

A study in Sweden led by the Centre for Health Equity Studies (Chess) at Stockholm University/Karolinska Institutet, is published in the Journal of Epidemiology & Community Health found that children living with just one parent after divorce suffer from more problems such as headaches, stomach aches, feelings of tension and sadness than those whose parents share custody.

Children of divorced parents are also more likely to experience conflict in their own marriages, and are more likely to experience divorce themselves. They are also more likely to be involved in short-term cohabiting relationships, which often dissolve before marriage. There are many studies that show proof of an intergenerational transmission of divorce, but this does not mean that having divorced parents will absolutely lead a child to divorce. There are two key factors that make this transmission of divorce more likely. First, inherited biological tendencies or genetic conditions may predispose a child to divorce as well as the "model of marriage" presented by the child's parents.

According to Nicholas Wall, former President of the Family Division of the English High Court, "People think that post-separation parenting is easy – in fact, it is exceedingly difficult, and as a rule of thumb my experience is that the more intelligent the parent, the more intractable the dispute. There is nothing worse, for most children, than for their parents to denigrate each other. Parents simply do not realize the damage they do to their children by the battles they wage over them. Separating parents rarely behave reasonably, although they always believe that they are doing so, and that the other party is behaving unreasonably."

Children involved in high-conflict divorce or custody cases can experience varying forms of psychological distress due to conflict between their parents. Legal professionals recognize that alienating behaviors are common in child custody cases, but are cautious about accepting the concept of parental alienation.

Research shows that children can be affected 2–4 years before the separation or divorce even occurs. This can be due to parental conflict and anticipation of a divorce, and decreased parental contact. Many couples believe that by separating, or becoming legally divorced that they are helping their children, and in situations of extreme parental conflict or abuse it most likely will be beneficial.

Exposure to marital conflict and instability, most often has negative consequences for children. Several mechanisms are likely to be responsible. First, observing overt conflict between parents is a direct stressor for children. Observational studies reveal that children react to inter-parental conflict with fear, anger, or the inhibition of normal behavior. Preschool children – who tend to be egocentric – may blame themselves for marital conflict, resulting in feelings of guilt and lowered self-esteem. Conflict between parents also tends to spill over and negatively affect the quality of parents' interactions with their children. Researchers found that the associations between marital conflict and children's externalizing and internalizing problems were largely mediated by parents' use of harsh punishment and parent–child conflict. Furthermore, modeling verbal or physical aggression, parents "teach" their children that disagreements are resolved through conflict rather than calm discussion. As a result, children may not learn the social skills (such as the ability to negotiate and reach compromises) that are necessary to form mutually rewarding relationships with peers.

Girls and boys deal with divorce differently. For instance, girls who initially show signs of adapting well, later suffer from anxiety in romantic relationships with men. Studies also showed that girls who were separated from their fathers at a younger age tended to be angrier toward the situation as they aged. Anger and sadness were also observed as common feelings in adolescents who had experienced parental divorce.

==== Misconduct and substance abuse ====
Children of divorced or separated parents exhibit increased behavioral problems and the marital conflict that accompanies parents' divorce places the child's social competence at risk. Children of divorced parents are more likely to search for outlets to cope with their emotions. For many struggling with social understanding and concepts of abuse or a lack of love in the home, drug abuse and general misconduct or violence are some of the indulgences that these children may be involved in.

=== Divorce of elderly couples ===
In the United States of America, since the mid-1990s, the divorce rate has increased to over 50% among baby boomers. More and more seniors are staying single; an analysis of census data conducted at Bowling Green State University predicted that divorce numbers would continue to rise. Baby boomers who remain unmarried are five times more likely to live in poverty than those who are married. They are also three times as likely to receive food stamps, public assistance or disability payments.

Sociologists believe that the rise in the number of older Americans who are not married is a result of factors such as longevity and economics. Women, especially, are becoming more and more financially independent which allows them to feel more secure with being alone, in addition to changing perceptions of being divorced or single. This has resulted in less pressure for baby boomers to marry or stay married.

== Statistics ==
=== Asia ===
==== China ====
China currently holds one of the highest divorce rates in the Asia Pacific region. Compared to 2000, China's divorce rates have gone up substantially from a 0.96 crude divorce rate to 3.09 rate in 2020. While China's divorce rate has been increasing since 2000, the highest recorded crude divorce rate in the past 20 years was in 2019 with 3.36 divorces. Divorce in China have come under increasing restrictions in the 2020s.

As of 2019, women initiate more than 70% of divorces in China.

As of January 2021, China introduced a new policy called the "cooling-off rule". China, seeing the rise in divorce rates increasing on a yearly basis, the Marriage and Family Edition of Civil Code of the People's Republic of China secured an article 1077 establishing a mandatory cooling-off period, which has two requirements. First, on the day in which authorities have received the divorce applications, both parties can withdraw the registration within 30 days, and additionally to that, after 30 days are up, couples are required to physically apply for divorce certificate, and if they do not show up, the initial divorce application will be automatically perceived as withdrawn. This novel policy has been extremely controversial, where couples are required to wait for at least 30-days before they can commence a divorce. The 30-day cooling off period is created with the aim of generating more social stability, which avoids couples from making rushed or in-the-heat-of-the-moment emotionally-charged decisions. Family stability has always been culturally rooted in China, influenced by Confucian beliefs where the harmony of family brings the success of everything. A divorce can only be granted when couples have gone through a one-month long delay in order to make a decision.

Since the implementation of the cooling-off rule, China's Ministry of Civil Affairs discovered a sharp 72 per cent drop in divorce rates since the previous quarter. It would thus appear that, given the 30-day cooling-off period, many couples eventually change their minds, potentially supporting the argument that most divorce decisions are made irrationally and emotionally. Although this measure has helped to reduce divorce rates in the country, Chinese citizens have responded negatively to the cooling-off policy, especially in cases of domestic abuse. According to the China Digital Times, a woman by the name of Kan Xiaofang was violently murdered by her husband during the 30-day cooling-off period after filing for divorce in 2021. As a result of such incidents, the 30-day rule has angered Chinese feminists, who believe that the policy undermines the concept of freedom, and does not take into consideration of domestic violence, which runs commonly within Chinese households. With this policy being implemented relatively recently, many thus argue that the policy must be examined more deeply to analyze the consequences of delaying the divorce process.

==== India ====
India has one of the lowest divorce rates in the world with around 1% of marriages ending in divorce, mainly because divorce is still stigmatized and seen as taboo.

Divorce is governed by various acts in India, depending on the religion of the couple:

- The Indian Divorce Act, 1869
- The Parsi Marriage and Divorce Act, 1936
- The Dissolution of Muslim Marriages Act, 1939
- The Special Marriage Act, 1954
- The Hindu Marriage Act, 1955
- The Foreign Marriage Act, 1969

==== Indonesia ====
In 2020 there were around 291,000 divorces recorded in Indonesia. These numbers are lower than the previous year – reportedly due to the pandemic and a longer dissolution process. Divorces are settled in religious courts, if they are Muslim, or through 'talaq' where a married man can pronounce divorce to his wife. There are six grounds of divorce, with an additional two for Muslim marriages, which include:

1. One of the spouses has committed adultery, is an alcoholic, is addicted to drugs, is a gambler or has other vices which are difficult to cure
2. One of the spouses has deserted the other spouse for two consecutive years – without consent and without legitimate reasons
3. One of the spouses has been sentenced to imprisonment for five years or more
4. One of the spouses has resorted to cruelty or severe ill-treatment, endangering the life of the other spouse
5. One of the spouses has developed a disability or disease, preventing him or her from fulfilling the duties of husband or wife
6. The spouses have irreconcilable differences as evidenced by frequent disagreements
7. The husband has violated taklik talak (a promise that the husband expressly made and written onto the marriage certificate)
8. One party converts from Islam to another faith

==== Iran ====
Iran introduced divorce quotas to break the rise in divorce rates amidst low marriage rates. The law grants the female party easy divorce if there is a certified document showing lack of compatibility. In part because of economic conditions one in every three marriages resulted in divorce by 2021; the high rates are linked to the shifting status of women and empowerment of individuals.

==== Japan ====
In Japan, divorces were on an upward trend from the 1960s until 2002 when they hit a peak of 290,000 divorces. While divorce rates have increased since the 1900s, they have also slightly declined since 2002. In fact, in 2020 there were approximately 193,300 divorces. This is a significant decrease from the prior year, 2019, which recorded 208,489 divorces.

There are several types of divorces in Japan; Divorce by Agreement, Divorce by Conciliation, and Divorce by Judgement. Divorce by Agreement (rikon), occurs when both parties mutually agree to separate and do not need to go to court. This is the most common type of divorce in Japan. Divorce by Conciliation (chotei rikon) is sought out when individuals are unable to agree on terms or separate. Thus, these cases go to court in hope to come to a mutual agreement for both parties. Lastly, Divorce by Judgement (saiban rikon) occurs when individuals are unable to reach an agreement in court during conciliation. Divorce by judgement is uncommon in Japan.

==== Singapore ====
Singapore has a crude divorce rate of 1.7 divorce per 1,000 residents. Singapore has seen a decrease in divorce rates compared to previous years. In fact, 2020 marks the lowest number of divorces recorded. In 2020, there were 6,700 divorces compared to 2015–2019, which recorded an average number of 7,536 marital dissolutions. Additionally, most divorces were initiated by women.

Singapore requires the applicant to be married for three years before filing for divorce. That being said, if one has suffered exceptional hardship, they are eligible to file for divorce before the three years. Additionally, to get a divorce, there must be proof of an "irretrievable breakdown" of one of the four factors which include adultery, unreasonable behaviour, desertion and separation.

==== South Korea ====
The crude divorce rate in South Korea in 2020 was 2.1. Compared to prior years, the number of divorces recorded depicts that there are less filed divorces each year. Both the number of marriages and divorces decreased from 2019 by 10.7% and 3.9% respectively.

The highest proportion of divorces in 2020 was amongst those who have been married for 20 years or more followed by those who have been married for four years or less. Such findings may suggest that divorce has become more socially accepted in South Korea and the stigma behind separating has lessened.

==== Taiwan ====
Taiwan's divorce rate in 2020 stood at 2.19 divorces per 1,000 residents. This is the lowest recorded divorce rate in the past 10 years. Many divorces in Taiwan are not done in court if there is a mutual agreement. If one of the parties does not consent to the divorce, then the other spouse may file for divorce under a valid reason of bigamy, infidelity, ill treatment or desertion. Before 2020, adultery in Taiwan was considered a crime and punishable by law.

=== Europe ===
Divorce has increased across Europe in the past decade – the rate varies between European countries. One study estimated that legal reforms accounted for about 20% increase of the divorce rates in Europe between 1960 and 2002. In 2019, Luxembourg had the highest divorce rate per 100 marriages followed by Portugal, Finland, and Spain. Countries in Europe with some of the lowest number of divorces per 100 marriages are Ireland and Malta.

==== Serbia ====
On average, for every three new marriages in Serbia, one divorce occurs. In 2019, 35,570 marriages were concluded in Serbia, 10,899 marriages were divorced, and the number of divorces per 1,000 inhabitants was 1.6%.

==== Sweden ====
The divorce proceedings begin with an application for separation of marriage to the district court. The application can be submitted by both parties jointly, if the spouses are in agreement, or individually by any of the parties, who do not have to agree to a divorce. Spouses who agree to a divorce, and do not have children under the age of 16, receive a judgment (decision) of divorce within a few weeks. If there are children under the age of 16 (including step children), the parties must wait 6 months before either, or both, parties may request completion of the divorce, in order to be formally separated in marriage. If the parties have lived apart for at least two years before the application for separation of marriage, the district court may decide on a direct divorce.

Fifty percent of all marriages in Sweden end in a divorce. Marriages that ended in a divorce lasted an average of 11.7 years. The most common age for divorce is between 35 and 49. Couples without mutual children separate or divorce most frequently.

==== United Kingdom ====
In 2015, the highest divorces rates in the UK were recorded all beside the sea, with Blackpool in the top position. The UK divorce rate is estimated at 42% and in 2019, around 107,599 divorces were reported. The highest number of divorce applications are reportedly made on Divorce Day, which is always the first Monday of the new year.

=== North America ===
==== United States ====
The crude divorce rate in 2022 in the United States is 2.3 divorces. This is significantly lower than prior years, such as those in 2001 where 4.1 divorces were recorded. These recent findings suggest a downward trend of the number of people dissolving their marriage. However, divorce rates range from state to state.

The National Center for Health Statistics reports that wives, with children present, filed for divorce in approximately two-thirds of cases from 1975 to 1988 in the U.S. For example, 71.4% of the cases were filed by women in 1975 and 65% were filed by women in 1988. It is estimated that upwards of 95% of divorces in the U.S. are "uncontested", because the two parties are able to come to an agreement without a hearing (either with or without lawyers/mediators/collaborative counsel) about the property, children, and support issues.

In 2000, the divorce rate reached its peak at 40% but has since slowly declined. In 2001, marriages between people of different faiths were three times more likely to get divorced than those of the same faith. In fact, in a 1993 study, members of two mainline Protestant religions had a 20% chance of being divorced in 5 years; a 33% for a Catholic and Evangelical, and a 40% chance for a Jew and a Christian.

Couples with different ethnicities and races also had distinctive divorce statistics. In 2008, a study by Jenifer L. Bratter and Rosalind B. King on the Education Resources Information Center, found that unions between White males and non-White females as well as between Hispanics and non-Hispanic individuals, have similar or lower risks of divorce than White marriages. Unions between a White male and Black female last longer than White-White pairings or White-Asian pairings. Conversely, a White female with a Black male and White female with an Asian male are more prone to divorce than White-White pairings.

Additionally, as found in 2010, success in marriage has been associated with a higher education and older age. For example, 81% of college graduates who were over 26 years old, who wed in the 1980s, were still married 20 years later. Additionally, 65% of college graduates under 26, who married in the 1980s, were still married 20 years later. Furthermore, 49% of high school graduates under 26 years old, who married in the 1980s, were still married 20 years later. Conversely, 2.9% of adults aged 35–39 and without a college degree got divorced in the year 2009 – compared with 1.6% with a college education.

Another study looking at population differences found that a 1% increase in the unemployment rate correlated with a 1% decrease in the divorce rate. This was found to be presumably true for individuals who were financially challenged when trying to afford the legal proceedings. Nevertheless, another study from 1900 to 2008 found that there was a significant increase in the risk of divorce following a layoff and being unemployed.

=== Oceania ===
==== Australia ====
The crude divorce rate in Australia in 2020 was 1.9 divorces per 1,000 residents. This rate has remained somewhat consistent throughout the past few years and is the same as the previous year. However, as divorces are granted after 12 months of separation, splits during COVID may not be reflected in the current divorce rate. The divorce rate has decreased substantially over the past 20 years with 2.6 divorces recorded per 1,000 residents in 2000. In order to apply for divorce, one must be separated for at least 12 months.

==== New Zealand ====
New Zealand's divorce rate in 2020 was 7.6 divorces per 1,000 residents. This rate marks a decrease from previous years – such as those in 1983 with a crude divorce rate of 13.3. In fact, this rate has decreased significantly from the previous year, 2019, with a divorce rate of 8.4. Before filing for divorce, the parties must be separated for at least two years. After this time, either party is able to submit an application. If it is a joint application but the parties do not appear in court, a dissolution order can be granted with the divorce taking effect after one month. If the parties appear in court together, the judge can make the dissolution order and the divorce will be effective immediately. If one party applies as a sole application, then the other spouse has the opportunity to defend it within a certain time period.

=== Africa ===
==== South Africa ====
According to Statistics South Africa, the number of divorces increased by 0.3% from 25,260 divorces granted in 2015 to 25,326 granted in 2016. About 44.4% of the 2016 divorces came from marriages that did not reach their tenth wedding anniversary. About 51.1% of divorces in 2016 were filed by women while men filed 34.2% divorce cases.

== Social attitudes ==
Attitudes toward divorce vary substantially across the world. Divorce is considered socially unacceptable by most of the population in certain sub-Saharan African countries such as Ghana, Uganda, Nigeria and Kenya, South Asian countries including India and Pakistan and South-East Asian countries such as the Philippines and Indonesia. The majority of the population considers divorce acceptable in Europe, Latin America and the United States. Divorce is also widely accepted in certain Muslim majority countries such as Jordan, Egypt and Lebanon, at least when men initiate it.

Mauritania is unusual for having a long history of accepting and celebrating divorce. Although exact statistics are not available, Mauritania is believed to have the highest divorce rate by far in the world, and it is not unusual for adults in Mauritania to marry and divorce five to ten times during their lifetimes.

Research has shown that unhappily married couples suffer 3–25 times the risk of developing clinical depression.

== In same-sex married couples ==
The legal process of divorce by same-sex couples is generally the same as any other.

Same-sex marriage was introduced in large European countries relatively recently: France in 2013, the UK in 2014, and Germany in 2017. Consequently, there have been relatively few studies of divorce by same-sex couples, and they have produced some conflicting information. In some countries, such as Norway and Sweden, lesbian couples may be more likely to divorce than gay couples or opposite-sex couples. Same-sex couples in rural areas may have a higher divorce rate.

In the US, permission of legal same-sex marriage has not adversely affected the rates of marriage or divorce of same- or different-sex couples.

=== Rights of spouses to custody of children ===
As of 2011, upon dissolution of a same-sex marriage, legal questions remained in the US as to the rights of spouses to custody of the biological children of their spouses.

Child custody policies include several guidelines that determine with whom the child lives following divorce, how time is divided in joint custody situations, and visitation rights. The most frequently applied custody guideline is the best interests of the child standard, which takes into account the parents' preferences, the child's preferences, the interactions between parents and children, children's adjustment, and all family members' mental and physical health.

== History ==
=== Greco-Roman culture ===
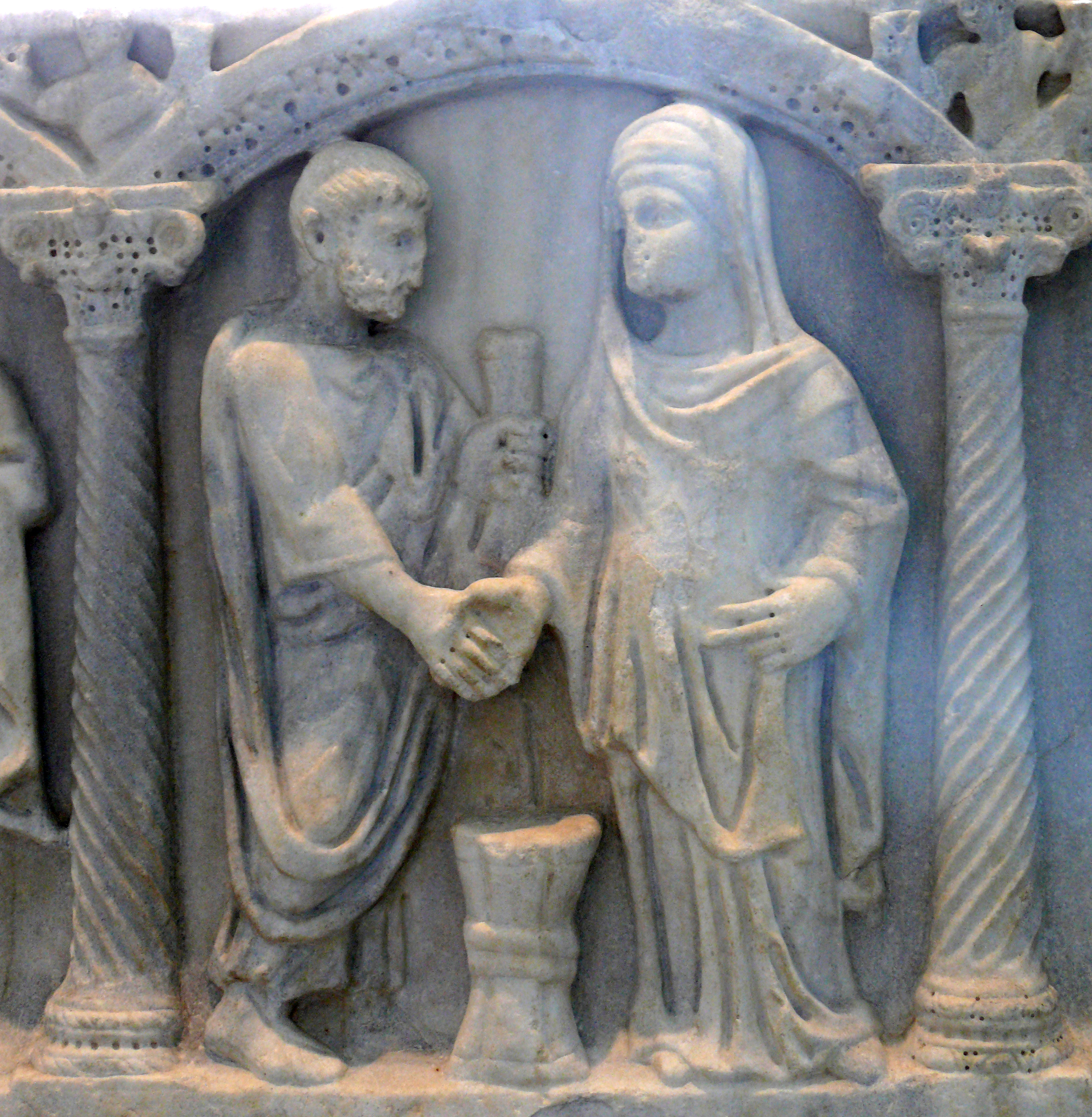
Roman married couple.

Rather than being conceived as a legal procedure, divorce in Classical Athens was largely thought to be a private matter — defined by law, but with no specific legal action required. To divorce his wife, an Athenian man need only to dismiss her by sending her back to her family. It is unknown what would have constituted socially acceptable grounds for divorce, save for the fact that it was required by law for men to divorce adulterous women. The procedure for divorce was considerably more difficult for women. In order to initiate divorce, Athenian women were required to appear in public before the archon to state their case. This procedure was a considerable exception to standard Athenian legal conventions, which barred women from representing themselves in court, as woman-initiated divorce proceedings required a woman to represent herself as a matter of public record.

Divorce was rare in early Roman culture but as their empire grew in power and authority Roman civil law embraced the maxim, "matrimonia debent esse libera" ("marriages ought to be free"), and either husband or wife could renounce the marriage at will. The Christian emperors Constantine and Theodosius restricted the grounds for divorce to grave cause, but this was relaxed by Justinian in the 6th century.

=== Mali Empire ===
In post-classical Mali, laws relating to divorced women were documented in the Timbuktu manuscripts.

=== Medieval Europe ===
After the fall of the Roman Empire, familial life was regulated more by ecclesiastical authority than civil authority. The Catholic and Orthodox Church had, among others, a differing view of divorce.

The Orthodox Church recognized that there are rare occasions when it is better that couples do separate. For the Orthodox, to say that marriage is indissoluble means that it should not be broken, the violation of such a union, perceived as holy, being an offense resulting from either adultery or the prolonged absence of one of the partners. Thus, permitting remarriage is an act of compassion of the Church towards sinful man.

Under the influence of the Catholic Church, the divorce rate had been greatly reduced by the 9th or 10th century, which considered marriage a sacrament instituted by Jesus Christ and indissoluble by mere human action.

Although divorce, as known today, was generally prohibited in Catholic lands after the 10th century, separation of husband and wife and the annulment of marriage were well known. What is today referred to as "separate maintenance" (or "legal separation") was termed "divorce a mensa et thoro" ("divorce from bed-and-board"). The husband and wife physically separated and were forbidden to live or cohabit together, but their marital relationship did not fully terminate. Civil courts had no power over marriage or divorce. The grounds for annulment were determined by a Catholic church authority and applied in ecclesiastical courts. Annulment was for canonical causes of impediment existing at the time of the marriage. "For in cases of total divorce, the marriage is declared null, as having been absolutely unlawful ab initio." The Catholic Church held that the sacrament of marriage produced one person from two, inseparable from each other: "By marriage, the husband and wife are one person in law: that is, the very being of legal existence of the woman is suspended during the marriage or at least incorporated and consolidated into that of the husband: under whose wing, protection and cover, she performs everything." Since husband and wife became one person upon marriage, recognition of that oneness could be rescinded only on the grounds that the unity never existed to begin with, i.e., that the proclamation of marriage was erroneous and void from the start.

=== Secularisation in Europe ===
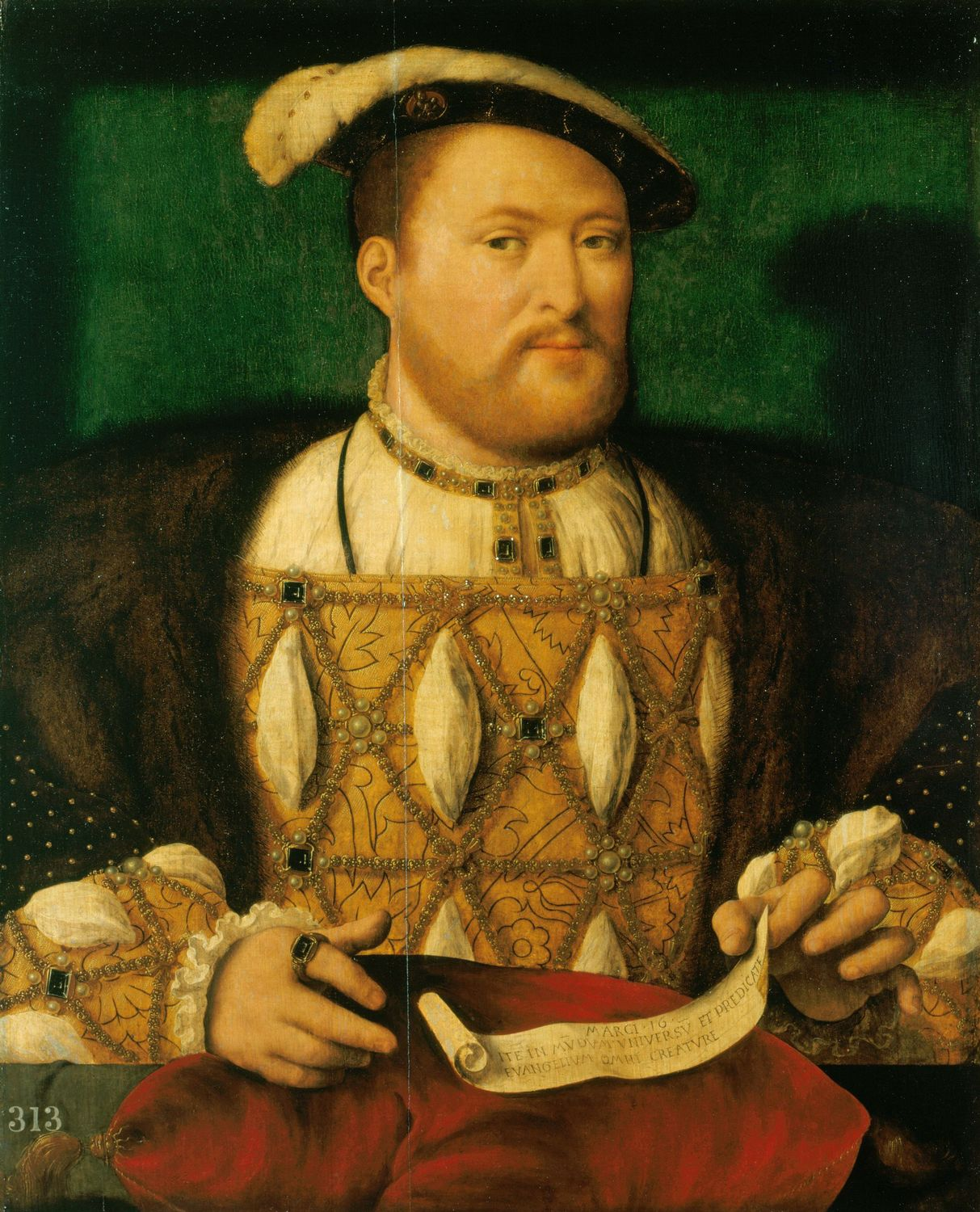
Henry VIII of England broke with the Catholic Church in order to obtain an annulment.

After the Reformation, marriage came to be considered a contract in the newly Protestant regions of Europe, and on that basis, civil authorities gradually asserted their power to decree a "divortium a vinculo matrimonii", or "divorce from all the bonds of marriage".

Since no precedents existed defining the circumstances under which marriage could be dissolved, civil courts heavily relied on the previous determinations of the ecclesiastic courts and freely adopted the requirements set down by those courts. As the civil courts assumed the power to dissolve marriages, courts still strictly construed the circumstances under which they would grant a divorce, and considered divorce to be contrary to public policy. Because divorce was considered to be against the public interest, civil courts refused to grant a divorce if evidence revealed any hint of complicity between the husband and wife to divorce, or if they attempted to manufacture grounds for a divorce. Divorce was granted only because one party to the marriage had violated a sacred vow to the "innocent spouse". If both husband and wife were guilty, "neither would be allowed to escape the bonds of marriage".

Eventually, the idea that a marriage could be dissolved in cases in which one of the parties violated the sacred vow gradually allowed expansion of the grounds upon which divorce could be granted from those grounds which existed at the time of the marriage to grounds which occurred after the marriage, but which exemplified violation of that vow, such as abandonment, adultery, or "extreme cruelty". An exception to this trend was the Anglican Church, which maintained the doctrine of marital indissolubility.

During the English Civil War, the Puritans briefly passed a law that divested marriage of all sacrament, leaving it as a secular contract that could be broken. John Milton wrote four divorce tracts in 1643–1645 that argued for the legitimacy of divorce on grounds of spousal incompatibility. His ideas were ahead of their time; arguing for divorce at all, let alone a version of no-fault divorce, was extremely controversial and religious figures sought to ban his tracts. In 1670 a precedent was first set with an act of Parliament, Lord Roos Divorce Act 1670 (22 Cha. 2. c. 1 Pr.), allowing Lord John Manners to divorce his wife, Lady Anne Pierrepont, and until the passage of the Matrimonial Causes Act 1857, divorce could only be obtained through a specific Act of Parliament.

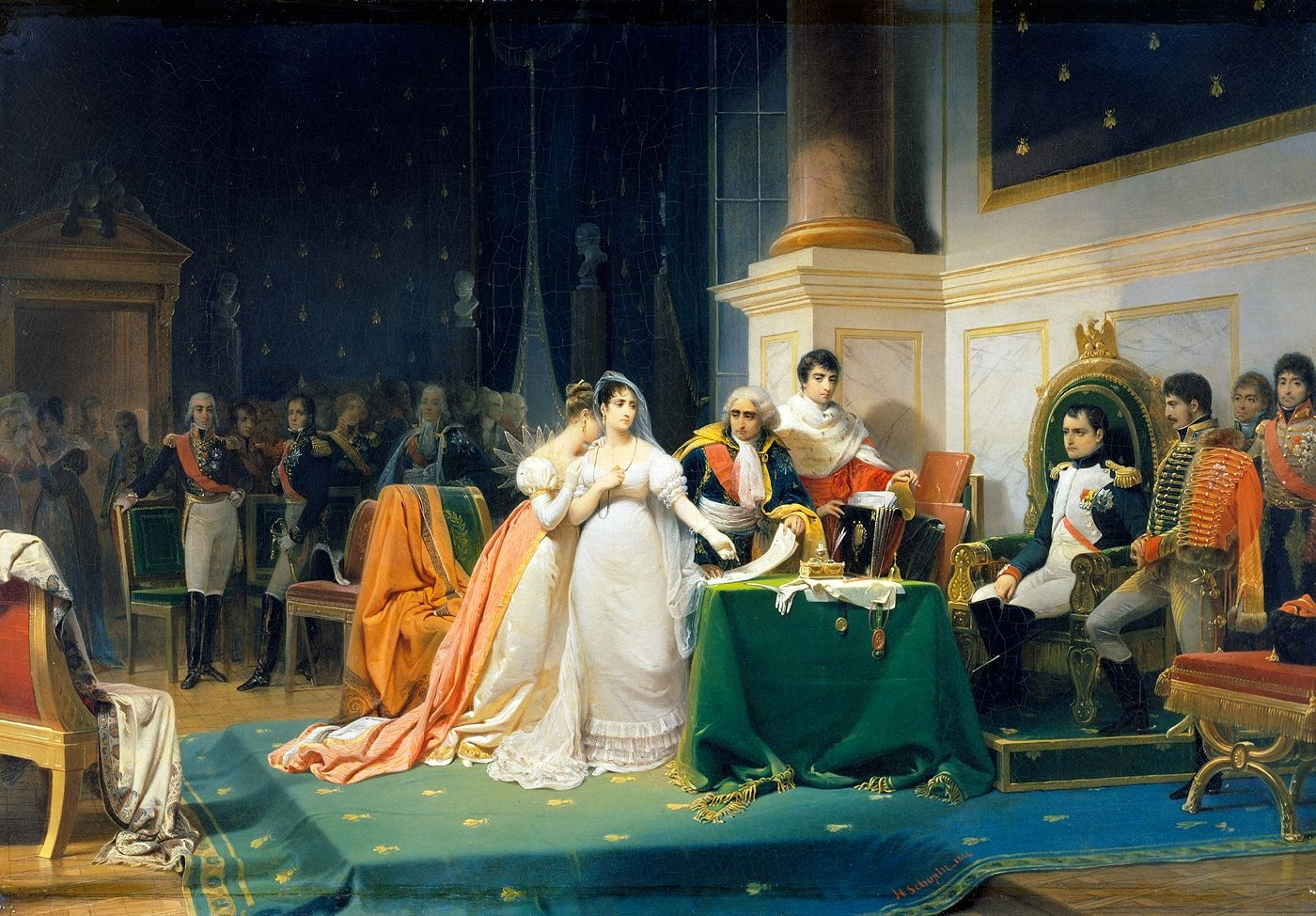
Joséphine, first wife of Napoleon, obtained the civil dissolution of her marriage under the Napoleonic Code of 1804.

The move towards secularisation and liberalisation was reinforced by the individualistic and secular ideals of the Enlightenment. The Enlightened absolutist, King Frederick II ("the Great") of Prussia, decreed a new divorce law in 1752, in which marriage was declared to be a purely private concern, allowing divorce to be granted on the basis of mutual consent. This new attitude heavily influenced the law in neighbouring Austria under Emperor Joseph II, where it was applied to all non-Catholic Imperial subjects. Divorce was legalised in France after the French Revolution on a similar basis, although the legal order of the ancien regime was reinstated at the Bourbon restoration of 1816. The trend in Europe throughout the 19th century, was one of increased liberalisation; by the mid-19th century, divorce was generally granted by civil courts in the case of adultery.

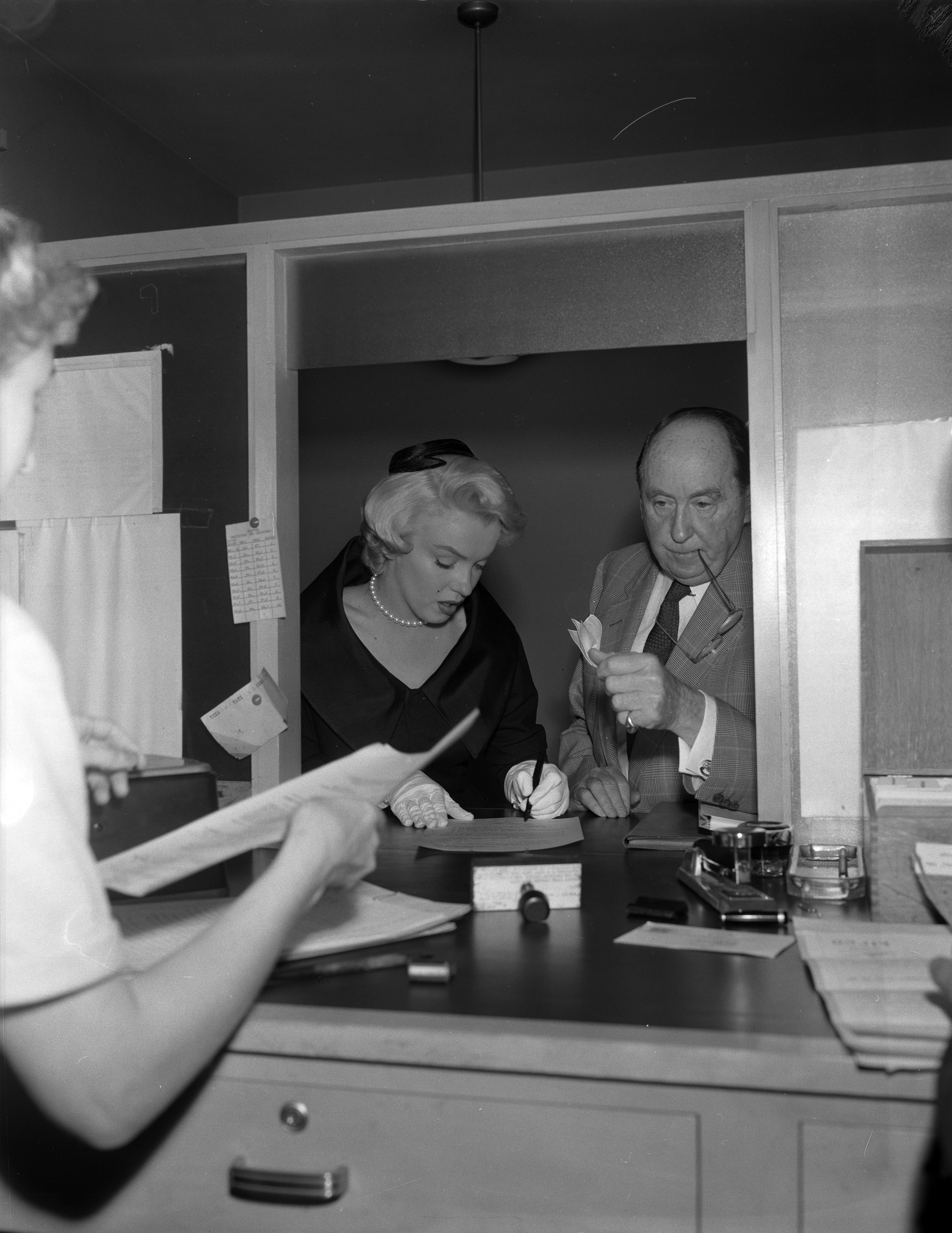
Marilyn Monroe signing divorce papers with celebrity attorney Jerry Giesler.

In Britain, before 1857 wives were regarded as under the economic and legal protection of their husbands, and divorce was almost impossible. It required a very expensive private act of Parliament costing perhaps £200, of the sort only the richest could possibly afford. It was very difficult to secure divorce on the grounds of adultery, desertion, or cruelty. The first key legislative victory came with the Matrimonial Causes Act 1857, which passed over the strenuous opposition of the highly traditional Church of England. The new law made divorce a civil affair of the courts, rather than a Church matter, with a new civil court in London handling all cases. The process was still quite expensive, at about £40, but now became feasible for the middle class. A woman who obtained a judicial separation took the status of a feme sole, with full control of her own civil rights. Additional amendments came in 1878, which allowed for separations handled by local justices of the peace. The Church of England blocked further reforms until the final breakthrough came with the Matrimonial Causes Act 1973.

In Spain, the 1931 Constitution of the Second Spanish Republic for the first time recognised a right to divorce. The first law to regulate divorce was the Divorce Act of 1932, which passed the Republican Parliament despite the opposition of the Catholic Church and a coalition of the Agrarian Minority and Minority Basque-Navarre Catholic parties. The dictatorship of General Franco abolished the law. After the restoration of democracy, a new divorce law was passed in 1981, again over the opposition of the Catholic Church and part of the Christian Democrat party, then a part of the ruling Union of Democratic Center. During the first socialist government of Felipe González Márquez, the 1981 law was amended to expedite the process of separation and divorce of marriages, which was again opposed by the Church, which called it "express divorce".

In Italy, the first divorce law was introduced on 1 December 1970, despite the opposition of the Christian Democrats, and entered into force on 18 December 1970. In the following years, the Christian Democrats, supported also by parties opposed to the law, promoted a recall referendum. In 1974, in a referendum, the majority of the population voted against a repeal of the divorce law. A feature of the 1970 divorce law was the long period of marital separation of five years required. This period was reduced to three in 1987 and to a year in 2015, in the case of judicial separation, and six months in the case of separation by mutual agreement.

Ireland and Malta approved divorce at referendums in 1995 and 2011 respectively.

Divorce rates increased markedly during the 20th century in developed countries, as social attitudes towards family and sex changed dramatically. Divorce has become commonplace in some countries, including the United States, Canada, Australia, Germany, New Zealand, Scandinavia, and the United Kingdom.

=== Japan ===
In the Edo Period (1603–1868), husbands could divorce their wives by writing letters of divorce. Frequently, their relatives or marriage arrangers kept these letters and tried to restore the marriages. Wives could not divorce their husbands. Some wives were able to gain sanctuary in certain Shinto "divorce temples". After a wife had spent three years in a temple, her husband was required to divorce her. In 19th century Japan, at least one in eight marriages ended in divorce.

There are four types of divorce in Japan: divorce by agreement in which the divorce is mutual; divorce by mediation, which happens in family court; divorce by decision of family court that takes place when a couple cannot complete a divorce through mediation; and divorce by judgment of a district court.

=== India ===
On a national level, the Special Marriage Act, passed in 1954, is an inter-religious marriage law permitting Indian nationals to marry and divorce irrespective of their religion or faith. The Hindu Marriage Act, 1955 legally permitted divorce to Hindus and other communities who chose to marry under these acts. The Indian Divorce Act 1869 is the law relating to the divorce of person professing the Christian religion. Divorce can be sought by a husband or wife on grounds including adultery, cruelty, desertion for two years, religious conversion, mental abnormality, venereal disease, and leprosy. Divorce is also available based on mutual consent of both the spouses, which can be filed after at least one year of separated living. Mutual consent divorce cannot be appealed, and the law mandates a minimum period of six months (from the time divorce is applied for) for divorce to be granted. Contested divorce is when one of the spouses is not willing to divorce the other; in such a circumstance divorce is granted only on certain grounds according to the Hindu marriage act of 1955. While a Muslim husband can unilaterally bring an end to the marriage by pronouncing talaq, Muslim women must go to court, claiming any of the grounds provided under the Dissolution of Muslim Marriage Act.

In the first major family law reform in the last decade, the Supreme Court of India banned the Islamic practice of "Triple Talaq" (divorce by uttering of the "Talaq" word thrice by the husband). The landmark Supreme Court of India judgment was welcomed by women activists across India.

Official figures of divorce rates are not available, but it has been estimated that 1 in 100 or another figure of 11 in 1,000 marriages in India end in divorce.

Various communities are governed by specific marital legislation, distinct to Hindu Marriage Act, and consequently have their own divorce laws:

- The Parsi Marriage and Divorce Act, 1936
- The Dissolution of Muslim Marriage act, 1939
- The Foreign Marriage Act, 1969
- The Muslim Women (Protection of Rights on Divorce) Act, 1986

An amendment to the marriage laws to allow divorce based on "irretrievable breakdown of marriage" (as alleged by one of the spouses) is under consideration in India. In June 2010, the Union Cabinet of India approved the Marriage Laws (Amendment) Bill 2010, which, if cleared by Parliament, would establish "irretrievable breakdown" as a new ground for divorce. Under the proposed amendment, the court before proceeding to the merits of the case must be satisfied by the evidences produced that parties have been living apart for a continuous period of not less than three years immediately preceding the presentation of the petition.

=== Islamic law ===
Divorce in Islam can take a variety of forms, some initiated by the husband and some initiated by the wife. The main traditional legal categories are talaq (repudiation), khulʿ (mutual divorce/annulment), judicial divorce and oaths. The theory and practice of divorce in the Islamic world have varied according to time and place. Historically, the rules of divorce were governed by sharia, as interpreted by traditional Islamic jurisprudence, and they differed depending on the legal school. Historical practice sometimes diverged from legal theory. In modern times, as personal status (family) laws were codified, they generally remained "within the orbit of Islamic law", but control over the norms of divorce shifted from traditional jurists to the state.

=== Philippines ===
Divorce as a means of terminating marriage is illegal for all Filipinos except Filipino Muslims. There is only civil annulment after a lengthy legal separation. The process is costly and long, and there are many legally married couples in extramarital relations, even without a divorce law.

Code of Muslim Personal Laws of the Philippines, known as Presidential Decree (PD) No. 1083, Title II- Marriage and Divorce, Chapter 3-Divorce allows for divorce recognized by the state. There are two sharia courts in the Philippine judicial system that hear these cases.

On 27 July 2010, Gabriela Women's Party filed in Congress House Bill No 1799, or the Divorce Bill of the Philippines, as one of many attempts to introduce pro-divorce legislation. Senator Pia Cayetano has filed a separate divorce bill in the Senate. During that time, the Philippines, along with Malta and the Vatican, are the three most conservative countries on the issue of divorce. The bill did not pass any level of legislation because of this.

In 2013, the divorce bill was refiled, and did not pass any level of legislation as well.

In a latest attempt, the divorce bill was refiled again in 2017. On 22 February 2018, the House of Representatives committee on population and family relations approved a bill seeking to legalize divorce, the first time in Philippine history for such a measure to pass the committee level of legislation. The majority of the members of the House of Representatives (lower house of Congress), both majority and minority blocs, are in favor of divorce. However, divorce continues to be a divisive issue in the Senate (upper house of Congress), as stark opposition is present among male senators.

=== Early America ===
In colonial America, marriage was understood to be for the purpose of reproductive and economic success. Divorce was granted if either party was proven to have deceived the other about their financial or reproductive status.

Impotence as grounds for divorce required physical examination of the husband. Women with malformed genitalia would also be examined by a midwife to determine if the malformation was responsible for infertility.

In the antebellum South, courts were reluctant to divorce white couples. Wives were the most likely to ask for divorce, however husbands were more likely to receive one. Successful divorces initiated by husbands were often in response to the wife's infidelity with a black man. A landmark court case in 1825 set the precedent of prioritizing the raising of white children over the wife's adultery.

In the 1860s, marriage law changed rapidly as the definition of miscegenation was altered to account for more and different racial categories. This sometimes forced the annulment of mixed-race marriages.

== Patterns ==
=== Post-World War II ===
Divorce rates increase during times of hardship, war, and major events. Divorce rates increased after World War II because people were quick to marry each other before they went to war. When soldiers returned, they found out that they did not have much in common with their spouses, so they divorced.

=== Celebrity culture ===
In 2024, an increasing number of "A-listers celebrities" were found to be engaging in a trend of discreet "silent divorces" as opposed to high-profile public divorces in the media in past years.

== See also ==
- Breakup
- Community property
- Divorce law around the world
- Divorce of same-sex couples – legal aspects, divorce rates
- Divorce party
- Dysfunctional family
- Fear of commitment
- Grey divorce
- Husband selling
- Implications of divorce
- List of countries by marriage and divorce rates
- List of most expensive divorces
- List of people who remarried the same spouse
- Januário Lourenço, inventor of electronic divorce
- New York divorce coercion gang
- Relationship counseling
- Relationship education
- Wife selling
- Wife selling (English custom)
