= Divorce in Norway =

Divorce in Norway can be obtained on several grounds.

== Divorce grounds ==
There are several grounds of divorce described in The Marriage Act.

=== One year legal separation ===
Either spouse may demand a legal separation, and after a year has passed, a divorce.

Section 20 provides that "A spouse who finds that he or she cannot continue cohabitation may demand a separation", while Section 21 provides "Each of the spouses may demand a divorce when they have been separated for at least one year."

However, the continuation of marital cohabitation during this period leads to the legal separation losing its effect, although this does not happen if the cohabitation, or an attempt to cohabitation, are transitional or brief.

=== Two years de facto separation ===
If the spouses have lived separate and apart for two years, this creates a ground of divorce.

Section 22 stipulates that "Each of the spouses may demand a divorce if they have not cohabited for at least two years."

=== Violence and forced marriage ===
Unlike the other previous grounds, this is a 'fault' ground, which means that a person obtains the divorce based on the wrongdoing of the other. However, the behavior must be of a serious nature, Section 23 reads: "A spouse may demand a divorce if the other spouse has intentionally attempted to kill him or her or their children or wilfully exposed them to severe maltreatment. The same applies if the spouse has behaved in a manner that is likely to arouse grave fear of such conduct". There is also a time limit placed on obtaining a divorce on this ground, a request must be made "within six months after the spouse learned of the act, and not later than two years after it took place"

In addition to the above, a spouse may also obtain a divorce if he/she has been forced into the marriage, whether by the other spouse or by somebody else.

=== Incestuous marriage and bigamous marriage ===
Section 24 provides that a person may obtain a divorce if the marriage was done contrary to Section 3. Prohibition against marriage between close relatives or Section 4. Prohibition against marriage when a previous marriage subsists.

== Statistics ==
Statistics from the year of 2000 found that divorce on the ground of legal separation accounted for the vast majority of divorces at 93.8%, divorce of the ground of de facto separation accounted for 4.3% of divorces, abuse accounted only for 0.3%, while for 1.6% the cause was unknown.
