= Divorce in Belgium =

Divorce in Belgium occurs at a higher rate than in most other European countries. The divorce law in Belgium underwent major modifications in 2007. The new law came into force in September 2007.

== Law ==
Tile VI. - About divorce (TITRE VI. - DU DIVORCE) defines the grounds for divorce. There are several types of divorce:

- divorce by mutual consent: spouses must be in agreement about everything (not only on the divorce itself but also on other aspects, such property division etc)
- divorce citing irreconcilable differences: this can be obtained on several grounds
  - having lived separate and apart for one year
  - by repeated legal declaration in front of the Tribunal at one year interval
  - having lived separate and apart for six months, if both spouses agree
  - by repeated legal declaration in front of the Tribunal at three months interval, if both spouses agree
  - by proving that there exist factors which make it impossible to continue life in common

== History ==
Divorce was allowed in the 19th century, and Belgium was one of the European countries to allow divorce by mutual consent before the 1970s, although in practice this was applied restrictively. Divorce could be obtained on a fault ground or by mutual consent. In 1974, a new additional ground was added allowing for unilateral divorce based on a ten-years separation period. In 1982, this was reduced to five years, and in 2000 to two years. In 1987, adultery was decriminalized, although it remained a ground of divorce. Although in 1994 the divorce procedure was drastically reformed, the grounds of divorce and its consequence remained the same. Until 2007, Belgium law remained a strong fault-based system, and the party who cited separation as ground to divorce against the will of the 'innocent' spouse was deemed to be at fault. The new divorce law of 2007 is largely no-fault, although some serious faults regarding the conviction of a criminal offense against the other spouse prohibit the asking of alimony by the guilty party (see Article 301).
