= Divorce law by country =

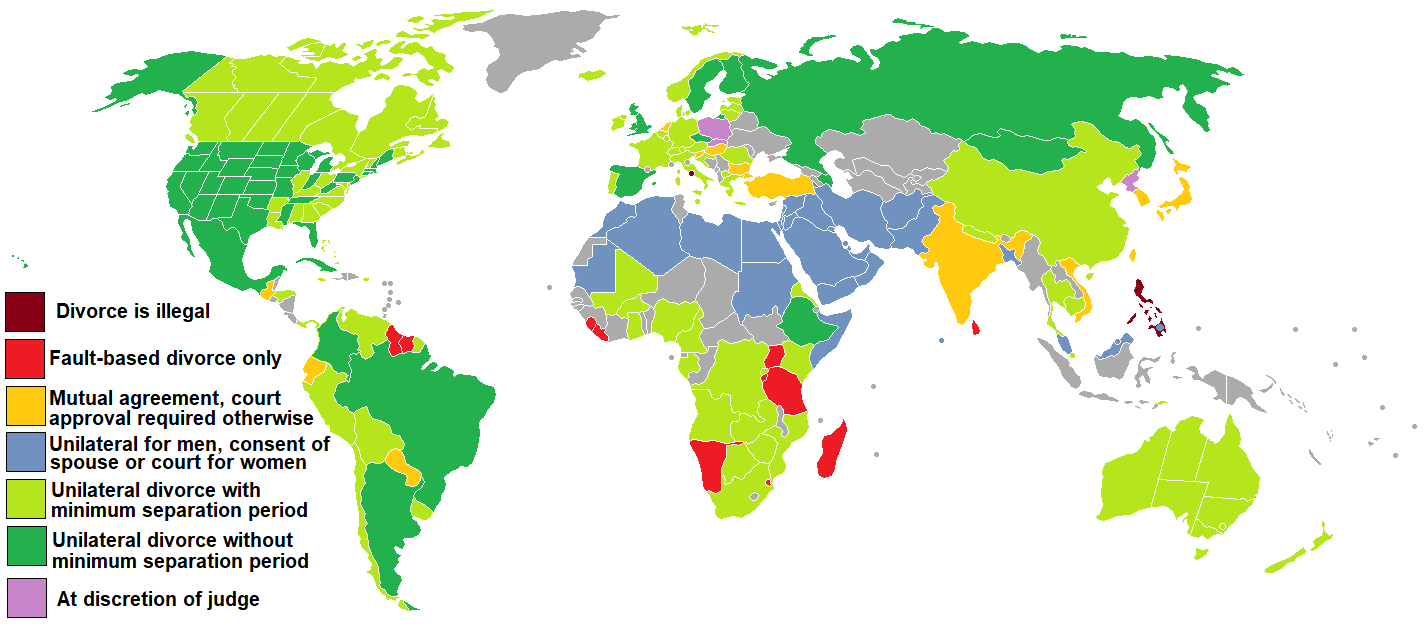
Divorce laws by country

Divorce law, the legal provisions for the dissolution of marriage, varies widely across the globe, reflecting diverse legal systems and cultural norms. Most nations allow for residents to divorce under some conditions except the Philippines (although Muslims in the Philippines do have the right to divorce) and the Vatican City, an ecclesiastical sovereign city-state, which has no procedure for divorce. In these two countries, laws only allow annulment of marriages.

== Summary table ==
Country/territory	Fault-based divorce	Mutual consent no-fault divorce	Unilateral no-fault divorce	History
Angola	Yes	Yes	One year separation	
Argentina	No	Yes	Yes	1987: Divorce legalized 2015: Unilateral divorce without separation requirement
Australia	No	One year separation		1975: No-fault divorce
Austria	Yes	Six month separation	Three year separation	1978: Unilateral divorce with separation requirement
Azerbaijan	No	One month waiting time	Up to three months cool-down period	
Bahamas	Yes	Five year separation		
Belgium	No	Six month separation	One year separation	1975: Unilateral divorce with separation requirement
Bolivia	Yes	Two year separation		
Botswana	No	Two year separation		
Brazil	Yes	Yes	Yes	1977: Divorce legalized 2010: One-year separation abolished
Bulgaria	Yes	Yes	Determined by court	
Burkina Faso	Yes	Yes	Three year separation	
Burundi	Yes	No	No	
Cambodia	Yes	Yes	One year separation	
Cameroon	Yes	Two year separation	Five year separation	
Canada	Yes	One year separation		
Chile	Yes	One year separation	Three year separation	2004: Divorce legalized
China	Yes	One month waiting time	Two year separation	
Colombia	Yes	Yes	Yes	1991: Divorce legalized only in 9 specific cases. 2025: Unilateral no-fault divorce without minimum separation period legalized.
Czech Republic	No	Yes	Yes	2026: Determination of fault not required any more (previously mostly only as formality)
Croatia	Yes	Yes	One year separation	
Cuba	No	Yes	Yes	
Democratic Republic of the Congo	Yes	Three year separation		
Denmark	Yes	Yes	Six month separation	1969: Unilateral divorce with separation requirement
East Timor	Yes	Yes	Three year separation	
Ecuador	Yes	Yes	Determined by court	
Eritrea	Yes	One year separation		
Estonia	Yes	Yes	Two year separation	
Ethiopia	Yes	Yes	Up to three month cool-down period	
Eswatini	Yes	No	No	
Finland	Yes	Yes	6 months reconsideration period	1988: Unilateral divorce without separation requirement
France	Yes	Yes	One year separation	1976: Unilateral divorce with separation requirement
Gabon	Yes	Three year separation		
Germany	No	One year separation	Three year separation	1977: Unilateral divorce with separation requirement
Ghana	Yes	Two year separation	Five year separation	
Guatemala	Yes	Yes	No	
Guyana	Yes	No	No	
Greece	Yes	Yes	Two year separation	1979: No-fault divorce 1983: Unilateral divorce with separation requirement
Honduras	Yes	Two-year separation		
Hungary	No	Yes	Determined by court	
Iceland	Yes	Six month separation	One year separation	1993: Unilateral divorce with separation requirement
India	Yes	One year separation	No	
Israel	Yes	Yes	Men only	
Ireland	Yes	Two year separation		1996: No-fault divorce
Italy	Yes	Six month separation	One year separation	1970: No-fault divorce 1975: Unilateral divorce with separation requirement
Jamaica	Yes	One year separation		
Japan	Yes	Yes	Determined by court	
Kenya	Yes	Two year separation		
Laos	No	Three month reconsideration period	Three year separation	
Latvia	Yes	Yes	Three year separation	
Liberia	Yes	No	No	
Lithuania	Yes	Yes	One year separation	
Luxembourg	No	Yes	Three month separation	1979: Unilateral divorce with separation requirement
Mali	Yes	Yes	Three year separation	
Madagascar	Yes	No	No	
Malta	No	Four year separation		2011: Divorce legalized
Mexico	Yes	Yes	Yes	
Mongolia	No	One month waiting time	Up to three months cool-down period	
Mozambique	Yes	One year separation	Three year separation	
Namibia	Yes	No	No	
Nepal	Yes	Yes	Three year separation	
Netherlands	No	Yes	Determined by court	1971: Unilateral divorce allowed
New Zealand	No	Two year separation		
Nigeria	Yes	Two year separation	Three year separation	
North Korea	Yes	Determined by court		
North Macedonia	Yes	Yes	One year separation	
Northern Ireland	Yes	Two year separation	Five year separation	
Norway	Yes	One year legal separation or two year de facto separation		1993: Unilateral divorce with separation requirement
Pakistan	Yes	Yes	Men only	
Panama	Yes	Yes	Two year separation	1911: Divorce legalized
Paraguay	Yes	Two year separation	No	1992: Divorce legalized
Peru	Yes	Yes	Two year separation	
Philippines	Muslim marriage only	No	No	1917: Fault-based divorce legalized 1950: Divorce abolished except for Muslims
Poland	Yes	Determined by court		
Portugal	No	Yes	One year separation	1976: Unilateral divorce with separation requirement 2008: Fault-based divorce abolished
Romania	Yes	Yes	Two year separation	
Rwanda	Yes	Two year separation		
Saudi Arabia	Yes	Yes	Men only	
Sierra Leone	Yes	No	No	
Singapore	Yes	Three year separation	Four year separation	
Slovakia	No	Determined by court		
Slovenia	Yes	Yes	Determined by court	
South Africa	Yes	One year separation		
South Korea	Yes	Yes	No	
Spain	No	Yes	Yes	1981: Unilateral divorce with separation requirement 2005: Unilateral divorce without separation requirement
Sri Lanka	Yes	No	No	
Suriname	Yes	No	No	
Sweden	No	Yes	6 months reconsideration period	17th century:: fault-based divorce 1915: Mutual agreement divorce 1973: Unilateral divorce
Switzerland	No	Yes	Two year separation	2000: Unilateral divorce with separation requirement
Russia	No	One month waiting time	Up to three months cool-down period	
Taiwan	Yes	Yes	Determined by court	
Tanzania	Yes	No	No	
Thailand	Yes	Yes	Three year separation	
Turkey	Yes	Yes	Determined by court	
Uganda	Yes	No	No	
United Kingdom (except Northern Ireland)	No	26+ weeks waiting period		1973: Unilateral divorce with separation requirement 2022: Fault-based divorce abolished
United States	Yes	Minimum period of separation or lack of sexual relations in Alabama, Arkansas, Delaware, Georgia, Illinois, Kentucky, Louisiana, Maryland, North Carolina, Ohio, South Carolina, Vermont and Virginia		
Uruguay	Yes	Three month separation	Two month separation	1907: Divorce by mutual consent 1913: Divorce by the sole will of the woman
Vietnam	Yes	Yes	Determined by court	
Vatican City	No	No	No	
Venezuela	Yes	One year separation	Five year separation	
Zambia	Yes	Two year separation	Five year separation	
Zimbabwe	Yes	One year separation		

== Muslim societies ==
Historically, the rules of divorce were governed by sharia, as interpreted by traditional Islamic jurisprudence, though they differed depending on the legal school, and historical practices sometimes diverged from legal theory.

Divorce in Islam is permitted, but the theology provides different rules for husbands from wives. Husbands may initiate divorce through ‘Talaq’, for any reason without requiring the wife's agreement. Some also include this to mean the stating of ‘Talaq’ three times at once to a wife, resulting in an instant divorce without route for reconciliation.

A wife seeking divorce from her husband may use the Khula process, where she must have solid grounds to end the marriage and then return to him her Mahr or a similar symbolic payment in return for his mutual consent to a divorce. If a wife cannot get her husband's agreement to a divorce, and he refuses to give ‘Talaq’, her final option is to seek approval from a judge at an Islamic court through the Faskh process.

However, the validity of a divorce from the spoken and instant Triple Talaq is controversial and debated, with many arguing it arises from an incorrect Quranic interpretation. Some scholars say that Triple Talaq should mean a husband saying ‘Talaq’ to his wife one time in each of three consecutive menstrual cycles (the Iddah period), or that a formal three-step process including notice, arbitration and separation should be followed. Consequently, laws and regulations regarding divorce proceedings vary in different Muslim majority countries (and countries with significant Muslim populations), with several criminalising Triple Talaq.

Countries that have abolished instant ‘Triple Talaq’ divorces include Pakistan, Egypt, Tunisia, Sri Lanka, Bangladesh, Turkey, Indonesia, Iraq and India. Belief in the validity of a Triple Talaq divorce may persist culturally among individuals, even in countries where it is legally invalid.

The main traditional legal categories are talaq (repudiation), khulʿ (mutual divorce), and faskh (dissolution/annulment of a marriage by an Islamic Court), which is the only route that a wife can take unilaterally. Islamically, only the husband has the right of talaq, unless the power of talaq has also been provided to the wife in the marriage contract (known as talaq i tafweez). Faskh is an annulment, meaning it rescinds the marriage as though it was never valid, and a wife must provide grounds and witnesses for a court to grant it.

== Argentina ==
In Argentina, the legalisation of divorce was the result of a struggle between different governments and conservative groups, mostly connected to the Catholic Church.

In 1888, Law 2,393 established that marriage and divorce in Argentina would be controlled by the State, not the Church. The law allowed for separation of the spouses by judicial order on the grounds of adultery, insults, violence, or desertion, but did not allow for dissolution of marriage.

Only in 1954, President Juan Domingo Perón had Law 14,394 passed over the objections of the Catholic Church. For the first time in the country, marriages could be ended and divorcees could remarry. But Perón was forced out of the presidency one year later by a military coup, and the government that succeeded him abolished the law.

From 1968 onwards, couples could legally separate without proving fault, but marriages still could not be dissolved.

Finally, in 1987, President Raúl Alfonsín was successful in passing the divorce law (Law 23,515), following a ruling of the Supreme Court. The new law also provided for gender equality between the wife and husband.

A new Civil and Commercial Code, modernizing family law and simplifying divorce, came into force in August 2015.

== Australia ==
Australia's laws on divorce and other legal family matters were overhauled in 1975 with the enactment of the Family Law Act 1975, which established no-fault divorce in Australia. Since 1975, the only ground for divorce is the irretrievable breakdown of the marriage, evidenced by a twelve-month separation. However, a residual "fault" element remains in relation to child custody and property settlement issues.

== Brazil ==
Due to the influence of the Roman Catholic Church, divorce became legal in Brazil only in 1977, by Law 6.515/77. In Brazil, before 1977, marriage was considered an indissoluble bond by the state. Couples who could no longer stand each other had only the desquite (legal separation) as legal outlet. This process separated assets and allowed for living apart but did not dissolve the marriage, meaning separated individuals could never legally remarry. Those who found new partners lived in what was then stigmatized a "concubinage," facing brutal prejudice, especially toward women, who were often viewed as "second-class" by conservative society.

The Catholic Church exerted strong political pressure against the legalization of divorce in Brazil. Nevertheless, Senator Nelson Carneiro became the central figure in the struggle for divorce legislation, advocating for its approval over a period of 26 years. In June 1977, Constitutional Amendment No. 9 was narrowly approved after intense conflict in Congress, and on December 26, 1977, President Ernesto Geisel sanctioned Law No. 6.515, officially legalizing divorce in Brazil. However, the law imposed significant restrictions designed to discourage marital dissolution. Divorce was permitted only after proof of a prior legal separation lasting at least three years, or a de facto separation of five years. Moreover, under the original 1977 legislation, individuals were allowed to divorce only once in their lifetime.

Subsequent legal reforms gradually reduced these barriers. The new Constitution of Brazil, enacted in 1988, shortened the required separation periods to one or two years, although divorce remained a lengthy judicial process. However, since 2007, when Law No. 11,447 which introduced extrajudicial divorce has enacted, Brazilian couples can request a divorce at a notary's office if they have no disputed property and no minor or special-needs children. The couple need only present their national IDs and marriage certificate, and pay a fee to initiate the process, which is completed in two or three weeks. However, as is common in other areas of interaction with the government in Brazil, an expert agent (despachante), expedites the process, and finalization of the documents by a lawyer is required.

The 66th amendment to Brazil's Constitution, passed in 2010, removed the prior requirement of one year's separation before a divorce could take place. Divorce currently considered in Brazil an immediate and unconditional right (direito potestativo), which means if one spouse wishes to divorce, the other’s consent is no longer required, and the judge may decree it without further justification.

According to data from the Brazilian Institute of Geography and Statistics (IBGE), more than 420,000 divorces were registered in 2022 alone.

== Bulgaria ==
In Bulgaria, a new Family Code came into effect in 2009, modernizing family law. Divorce can be obtained by two means:

- by mutual consent. (Article 50) In this case, both spouses agree to divorce; and the court admits the divorce without searching for the reasons for it
- at the request of either spouse if "the matrimony is deeply and irretrievably dissolved". (Article 49) The court only pronounces itself on the 'fault' of the spouse(s) if this has been specifically requested by one of the spouses.

== Canada ==
=== Federal divorce law ===
Under the Constitution of Canada, divorce law is a matter of federal jurisdiction, for the Parliament of Canada. However, Canada did not have a uniform federal divorce law until 1968. Before that time, the process of getting a divorce varied from province to province:

- In Newfoundland and Quebec, it was necessary to get a private act of the federal Parliament to end a marriage.
- The three Maritime provinces relied on their own pre-Confederation divorce laws which continued in force after 1867.
- In the four western provinces, the English Matrimonial Causes Act 1857 applied, through the doctrine of reception of English statute law. Under that act, a husband could get a divorce on the grounds of his wife's adultery. A wife could not rely simply on her husband's adultery, but had to establish that her husband committed adultery and another listed behavior. In 1925, Parliament provided that in those provinces, a wife could sue on grounds of adultery alone.
- In Ontario, divorce was not permitted until 1930, when the federal Parliament enacted a divorce law which applied specifically to Ontario.

The federal Divorce Act of 1968 standardized the law of divorce across Canada and introduced the no-fault concept of permanent marriage breakdown as a ground for divorce as well as fault-based grounds including adultery, cruelty and desertion. In 1986, Parliament replaced the Act, which simplified the law of divorce further.

In Canada, while property and civil rights are in the jurisdiction of the provinces, the Constitution of Canada specifically made marriage and divorce the realm of the federal government. The federal government used this power in 1968 to enact the first Divorce Act which applied throughout Canada. This means that Canada's divorce law is now uniform throughout Canada, including Quebec, which differs from the other provinces in its use of the civil law as codified in the Civil Code of Quebec as opposed to the common law that is in force in the other provinces. The law for division of property and debt, however, is within the jurisdiction of each province or territory, creating a structure where provincial and federal laws will apply in the resolution of the issues in most divorce claims.

The Canada Divorce Act recognizes divorce only on the ground of breakdown of the marriage. The breakdown can only be established if one of three grounds hold: adultery, cruelty, and being separated for one year. Most divorces proceed based on the spouses being separated for one year, even if there has been cruelty or adultery.

The one-year period of separation starts from the time at least one spouse intends to live separate and apart from the other and acts on it. A couple does not need a court order to be separated.

A couple can be considered to be "separated" even if they are living in the same dwelling, provided they demonstrate a clear intention to end the marital relationship and live separate lives. Either spouse can apply for a divorce in the province in which either the husband or wife has lived for at least one year.

On September 13, 2004, the Ontario Court of Appeal declared a portion of the Divorce Act also unconstitutional for excluding same-sex marriages, which at the time of the decision were recognized in three provinces and one territory. It ordered same-sex marriages read into that act, permitting the plaintiffs, a lesbian couple, to divorce.

==== Recognizing of foreign divorces in Canada ====
In Canada, foreign divorces are recognized under Section 22 of the Divorce Act:

- Section 22(1) allows recognition of foreign divorces when one spouse has been ordinarily resident in the foreign country for at least one year before the divorce.
- Section 22(2) applies to cases involving minor spouses, where a Canadian legal opinion can validate the divorce without court intervention.
- Section 22(3) preserves other legal rules on recognizing foreign divorces on the basis of precedents, such as
  - Powell v. Cockburn, 1976 CanLII 29 (SCC), [1977] 2 SCR 218, which established that foreign divorces may be presumed valid under certain conditions, supported with valid evidence. If the party seeking recognition of the foreign divorce provides sufficient evidence, the presumption of validity is typically upheld.
  - Downton v. Royal Trust Co. et al., 1972 CanLII 148 (SCC), which established a significant precedent regarding when a person's participation in a foreign divorce proceeding prevents them from later denying its validity to gain a financial advantage.
  - Beals v. Saldanha, 2003 CSS 72, which explicitly extended the "real and substantial connection" test to the recognition and enforcement of judgments from foreign countries, not just interprovincial judgments.
  - Dunmore v. Mehralian, 2025 SCC 20, which clarified the guiding principle for determining a child's "habitual residence" in family law cases.

Provinces make their own Common law regarding foreign divorces, such as Rothgiesser v. Rothgiesser, 2000 CanLII 1153, a landmark Ontario Court of Appeal case that established that Ontario courts lack jurisdiction to grant corollary relief, such as spousal support, after a valid divorce has been granted in a foreign country.

In Canadian provincial courts, the development of case law frequently involves later decisions drawing upon previous rulings that may not be directly applicable to the specific case. A notable illustration of this pattern is found in Antonyuk v. Antonyuk, 2020 ONSC 644 (CanLII). The husband's divorce was granted in a foreign jurisdiction at the address of his other wife, while his family remained in Canada, the child’s habitual residence was in Canada, the parties were not separated, and no divorce documents were served on his actual wife. The evidence consisted of a handwritten resolution rather than a formal legal court judgment. The husband foreign expert's testimony affirmed the validity of the foreign divorce, even though it was obtained at an incorrect address, without service, and lacked a formal legal divorce decree or child custody decision. The court accepted the foreign expert’s testimony, recognizing the foreign divorce of husband as valid, even though it conflicted with Canadian legal standards for divorce and foreign judgment recognition.

Key Feature Comparison of Antonyuk v. Antonyuk decision with Precedents used as reasons for decision.

Feature	Antonyuk	Essa (Precedent)	Wilson (Precedent)	Common Law Requirements for Recognizing Foreign Divorces in Canada
Proof of Validity	"Handwritten resolution". No legal court judgment, No legal opinion of Canadian lawyer.	Canadian lawyer (H. Mehrez) confirmed the validity of foreign divorce documents.	Canadian lawyer (M. Hinchey) and joint confirmation of validity.	A valid proof of the foreign divorce is required for recognition in Canada, including confirmation of validity through an expert or official source.
Natural Justice: Service/Notice Received	Wife was not served (as submitted by husband's foreign expert, divorce without service of documents allowed under Ukrainian law ).	Egyptian court records and the wife confirmed notice received	Both parties jointly initiated the divorce in Peru	The person whose status is being changed must participate in the process, typically through notice and service of legal proceedings.
Child Custody/Support	No custody decision made for 12-year-old child; no child support; husband abandoned the child	Egyptian court confirmed custody arrangements	No children	Canadian law assumes "joint custody" and financial responsibility for children, unless otherwise stipulated by agreement or court order. Child abandonment is taken seriously and can have legal and criminal implications.
Real and Substantial Connection to Foreign Jurisdiction	Habitual residence of a child was in Canada. The parties had no Ukrainian address or internal passport, which were required for legal divorce in Ukraine.	Habitual residence of children in Egypt was established	Minimal connection to jurisdiction accepted as a joint divorce with no children	A real and substantial connection to the foreign jurisdiction is required to prevent "forum shopping," where parties seek to exploit favorable divorce laws in other countries.

This case highlights the lack of a standardized procedure for recognizing foreign divorces in Canadian courts. Judges have significant discretion and can issue unpredictable decisions, sometimes contrary to the Evidence Act, Divorce Act, and Common Law, by relying on foreign expert testimony to justify the recognition of a divorce in Canada despite serious mismatches with Canadian law and natural justice.

Canadian courts exhibit inconsistent recognition of foreign divorces, exemplified by Antonyuk v Antonyuk versus cases like Pratt v. Korculanic. While Antonyuk recognized a foreign divorce based on irrelevant precedents Essa v Mekawi and Wilson v Kovalev, other similar cases, such as Pratt v. Korculanic, 2025 ONSC 5707, have resulted in non-recognition, citing a fundamental denial of natural justice. This divergence underscores a significant lack of jurisprudential clarity regarding foreign divorce recognition.

=== Separation ===
Most provinces of Canada do not have the concept of legal separation. Sometimes, when people say they are legally separated, they mean that they have entered into a legally binding agreement, sometimes called a Separation Agreement, a Divorce Agreement, a Custody, Access and Property Agreement, or Minutes of Settlement. These types of agreements are usually prepared by lawyers, signed in front of witnesses, and legal advice is given to both parties signing the agreement. These types of agreements will, in most cases, be upheld by the courts.

However, legal separation is available in the province of Saskatchewan, upon application to the Court of King's Bench. Legal separation is distinct from a divorce and does not end the marriage.

=== Alberta ===
In Alberta, The Family Law Act gives clear guidelines to family members, lawyers and judges about the rights and responsibilities of family members. It does not cover divorce, and matters involving family property, and child protection matters. The Family Law Act replaces the Domestic Relations Act, the Maintenance Order Act, the Parentage and Maintenance Act, and parts of the Provincial Court Act and the Child, Youth and Family Enhancement Act. The Family Law Act can be viewed and printed from the Alberta King's Printer website.

One goes to the Court of Queen's Bench of Alberta to obtain a declaration of parentage for all purposes if someone has the property to be divided or protected court and or for a declaration of irreconcilability.

=== British Columbia ===
While the overall law is standard at the federal level, each province has its own act determining the rules for the division of property and debt, as well as its own procedure for obtaining an order through the courts. In British Columbia, the Family Law Act covers the division of property and debt between divorcing spouses. The rules of the Supreme Court of British Columbia provide for contested procedures, where parties do not agree on terms, and for uncontested divorces (also called desk order divorces) through streamlined procedures designed for spouses who agree on the terms for divorce orders and other relief. To get a divorce order, the court must be satisfied that:

- the marriage legally exists,
- at least one of the parties has been ordinarily resident in British Columbia for at least one year before the proceeding began,
- the ground on which marriage breakdown is claimed has been proven, and,
- if there are children, an adequate amount of child support is being paid.

Ontario requires one year separation

== Chile ==
Chile legalized divorce in 2004, overturning an 1884 legal code. The law that legalized divorce is called the Nueva Ley de Matrimonio Civil ("New Civil Marriage Law"), and was first introduced as a bill in 1995; there had been previous divorce bills before, but this one managed to secure enough conservative and liberal support to pass. Under the new law, couples must be separated for a year before divorcing if the split is mutual, and three years if the split is not mutual.

The four marital statuses that exist within Chile are married, separated, divorced, and widow(er). Only the divorced and widow(er) statuses allow a new marriage. Before the legalization of divorce, the only way to leave a marriage was to obtain a civil annulment, and annulments were only granted by telling the civil registrar that the spouse had lied in some way concerning the marriage license, thereby voiding the marriage contract.

== China ==
In China, divorce law is the fourth chapter of Marriage Law which has been firstly passed since 1950. Divorce could not be sought by women before the law. The law ensures the freedom of marriage (to marry and to divorce) and prevents others' interference.

Generally speaking, there are two methods to ask for a divorce:

1. If a couple is willing to divorce, they can go to the government office of civil affairs for divorce registration. The agency will issue a divorce certificate when it ensures that both spouses are indeed voluntary and have properly dealt with the children and property issues.
2. If only one of the two spouses requests the divorce, the spouse can accept mediation from the relevant department or sue for a divorce. In most cases, the court would offer mediation before the trial; if the relationship has indeed broken and the mediation is invalid, the court would grant the request. In any of the following circumstances, then divorce should also be granted: (1) bigamy (2) domestic violence or abuse, or abandonment of family members (3) long-term gambling, drug, etc. (4) separation for more than two years (5) other factors that might break the relationship.

The arrangement of children and property is based on the consent of two parties. However, the relationship between children and parents is not broken down by the divorce, which means both parents have the right and obligation to raise and educate the children.

One special characteristic of divorce in China is the process of mediation. This justice process is influenced by both Western modernism and Chinese tradition. Mediated reconciliation is an important process in Chinese justice systems. Before 1990, courts dealt with 80% of civil cases through mediation instead of adjudication. However, in recent research, it turns out the courts have shifted from mediation to adjudication as handling divorce cases after reforms of the Chinese judiciary in the 1990s, and more effective and systematical approach has been restricted by Marriage Law. Additionally, divorce reform strictly defined domestic violence and expanded forms of matrimonial assets. These substantially protect the property rights of women after divorce and empower women in the family, which is also shown by a less skewed child sex ratio.

== Czech Republic ==
Czech divorce law underwent major changes in 2026. There are now three types of divorce in the country: contractual, amicable and contentious. Contractual requires an agreement between the spouses regarding settlement of marital property. If the parties fail to reach such agreement, they will be divorced amicably, unless a contentious divorce is triggered. Contentious divorce takes place when one of the spouses claims that there are extraordinary reasons for denial of divorce. Marriage can be divorced only by an appropriate court. If the spouses have mutual underage children, the court will make a decision on custody and divorce in a single proceedings.

== France ==
The French Civil code (modified on January 1, 2005), permits divorce for 4 different reasons; mutual consent; acceptance; separation of one year; and due to the 'fault' of one partner. The first French divorce law was passed on 20 September 1792, during the French Revolution. It was subsequently modified in 1793 and 1794, and eventually incorporated in the Civil code It was repealed on 8 May 1816, at the instigation mainly of the Catholic church, after the restoration of the Bourbon kings. Divorce was reestablished by law on 27 July 1884. Divorce by mutual consent was authorized on 11 July 1975.

On 23 January 2025, the European Court of Human Rights (ECtHR) ruled in H.W. v. France (13805/21) that a French woman was not at fault for her divorce due to not engaging in sexual relations with her husband during their marriage. The ruling overturned a French court decision that deemed her failure to fulfil "marital duties" (devoir conjugal) as grounds for fault.

== Greece ==
In Greece, marriage and divorce regulations have undergone major changes in 1982 and 1983, when civil marriage was introduced; and the family law was modified to ensure gender equality.

Divorce in Greece can be obtained on several grounds:

- divorce by mutual consent (both spouses must agree)
- divorce on the ground that the marriage has been strongly impaired due to reasons that can be imputed either to the defendant or both spouses, making the continuation of the marriage unbearable for the petitioner
- divorce on the ground of separation of 2 years (Article 14 of Law 3719/2008 reduced the separation period from 4 years to 2 years)

== India ==
In the Hindu religion, marriage is a sacrament and not a contract, hence divorce was not recognized before the codification of the Hindu Marriage Act in 1955. With the codification of this law, men and women both are equally eligible to seek divorce. Hindus, Buddhists, Sikhs, and Jains are governed by the Hindu Marriage Act 1955, Christians are governed by The Divorce Act 1869, Parsis by the Parsi Marriage and Divorce Act 1936, Muslims by the Dissolution of Muslim Marriages Act, 1939 and Inter-religious marriages are governed by The Special Marriage Act 1954.

Conditions are laid down to perform a marriage between a man and a woman by these laws. Based on these a marriage is validated, if not it is termed as void marriage or voidable marriage at the option of either of the spouses. Hereupon filing a petition by anyone spouse before the Court of law a decree of nullity is passed declaring the marriage as null and void.

A valid marriage can be dissolved by a decree of dissolution of marriage or divorce and Hindu Marriage Act, The Divorce Act and Special Marriage Act allow such a decree only on specific grounds as provided in these acts: cruelty, adultery, desertion, apostasy from Hinduism, impotency, venereal disease, leprosy, joining a religious order, not heard of being alive for a period of seven years, or mutual consent where no reason has to be given. Since each case is different, court interpretations of the statutory law get evolved and have either narrowed or widened their scope.

Family Courts are established to file, hear and dispose of such cases.

== Ireland ==
Under the Constitution of Ireland adopted in 1937, there had been a bar on any law providing for the dissolution of marriage. An amendment to allow divorce under specified circumstances was rejected with 63.5% against in a referendum in 1986. However, in 1995, a second amendment was approved by referendum with 50.3% in favour to allow divorce in circumstances where a couple had been separated for four out of the preceding five years, and proper provision is made for both spouses and any children. Divorce law is governed by the Family Law (Divorce) Act 1996. This law was later amended in 2019 by a further third amendment and the subsequent Family Law Act 2019. It is possible to be considered separated while living under the same roof.

Divorces obtained outside Ireland are only recognised by the State if either:

- at least one of the spouses was domiciled within the jurisdiction which issued the decree of divorce at the time of issue, or
- the state is required to recognise the divorce according to the relevant European Union regulations — currently Council Regulation (EC) No 2201/2003 concerning jurisdiction and the recognition and enforcement of judgments in matrimonial matters and the matters of parental responsibility.
- Following a national referendum held on 24 May 2019 on amending Ireland's restrictive divorce laws (in force since 1995), the four-year waiting time for a divorce was removed from the constitution by a c.82% majority of voters. The legislature will be thus enabled to write into Irish law a much-reduced waiting period required to obtain a divorce.
- Following the same referendum legislators will also be enabled to write into Irish law an easing of restrictions in recognising divorces obtained in other jurisdictions
- In October 2019, Irish President Michael D. Higgins signed into law the Family Law Act 2019 which amended the 1996 Divorce Act by shortening the period of separation from four years to two years and reduced the waiting period, which occurs after the divorce is filed, from five years to three years. This Act became effective on 1 December 2019.

== Italy ==
Divorce was introduced in Italy by the law of 1 December 1970 (amended several times until 2015). An abrogative referendum supported by Catholic organizations and by the Vatican was defeated on 12 May 1974. A constitutional issue had been also raised about Italy's obligations under the Lateran Treaty, entered into in 1929, on whether it prohibited Italy from authorizing divorce. Before 1970, there was no provision for divorce in Italian law, and the difficulty of ridding oneself of an unwanted spouse in the absence of any legal way to do so was a frequent topic of drama and humour, reaching its apotheosis in the 1961 film Divorce, Italian Style.

In Italy, almost all divorces are granted on the ground of legal separation. Since 2015, the period of legal separation necessary for divorce is one year in the cases of contested separation and six months in the cases of consensual separation (previously, five years since 1970 and three years since 1987), since the comparison of the spouses at the first hearing in the separation procedure or since the date of the separation agreement. A separation decree may be granted when there are facts that would render the continuation of married life intolerable or have a serious and damaging impact on the upbringing of the children. Separation may also be granted by mutual consent. Separation by mutual consent and uncontested divorce are also possible without judicial procedure.

Divorce may be granted without a previous legal separation only in very rare cases (e.g. final criminal conviction, annulment or divorce obtained abroad by the foreign spouse, unconsummated marriage, sex change).

Divorces in Italy by region (2021)

== Japan ==
In Japan, there are four types of divorce: divorce by mutual consent, divorce by family court mediation, divorce by family court judgement, and divorce by district court judgment.

Divorce by mutual consent is a simple process of submitting a declaration to the relevant government office that says both spouses agree to divorce. This form is often called the "green form" due to the wide green band across the top. If both parties fail to reach an agreement on conditions of a divorce by mutual consent, such as child custody which must be specified on the divorce form, then they must use one of the other three types of divorce. Foreign divorces may also be registered in Japan by bringing the appropriate court documents to the local city hall along with a copy of the family registration of the Japanese ex-spouse. If an international divorce includes joint custody of the children, it is important to the foreign parent to register it, because joint custody is not legal in Japan. The parent to register the divorce may thus be granted sole custody of the child according to Japanese law.

Divorce by mutual consent in Japan differs from divorce in many other countries, causing it to not be recognized by all countries. It does not require the oversight by courts intended in many countries to ensure an equitable dissolution to both parties. Further, it is not always possible to verify the identity of the non-Japanese spouse in the case of an international divorce. This is due to two facts. First, both spouses do not have to be present when submitting the divorce form to the government office. Second, a Japanese citizen must authorize the divorce form using a personal stamp (hanko), and Japan has a legal mechanism for the registration of personal stamps. On the other hand, a non-Japanese citizen can authorize the divorce form with a signature. But there is no such legal registry for signatures, making forgery of the signature of a non-Japanese spouse difficult to prevent at best, and impossible to prevent without foresight. The only defence against such forgery is, before the forgery occurs, to submit another form to prevent a divorce form from being legally accepted by the government office at all. This form must be renewed every six months.

== Laos ==
In Laos, couples who wish to divorce must express their intention in writing to their parents, grandparents, head of village and at least three witnesses. All people, aside from couples, must try to motivate the couple not to divorce and to reconciliate. This is different from neighbouring Thailand, in which uncontested divorce is legal. A mandatory period of three months is then given so the couple can reflect and cancel their intention. If the couple insists that they must divorce, the head of village must file an application to the registrar's office located in each districts. If one party commits adultery, harm another party bodily or mentally, goes missing, becomes a priest without an agreement, is sentenced to a custody for more than five years, another party must seek a court divorce.

== Malta ==
Despite civil marriage being introduced in 1975, no provision was made for divorce except for the recognition of divorces granted by foreign courts. Legislation introducing divorce came into effect in October 2011 following the result of a referendum on the subject earlier in the year. It provides for no-fault divorce, with the marriage being dissolved through a Court judgement following the request of one of the parties, provided the couple has lived apart for at least four years out of the previous five and adequate alimony is being paid or is guaranteed. The same law made several important changes regarding alimony, notably through extending it to children born of marriage who are still in full-time education or are disabled and through protecting alimony even after the Court pronounces a divorce.

== New Zealand ==
The Family Proceedings Act 1980 came into effect on 1 October 1981 and transferred jurisdiction for divorce proceedings from the High Court to the newly created Family Court. From that date, the term used was no longer divorce but the dissolution of marriage or civil union. Application is made to the Family Court for dissolution on the grounds that the marriage or civil union has broken down irreconcilably and the spouses have been separated for two years or more. The application may be made jointly or by either party.

== Philippines ==
Philippine law does not provide for divorce inside the country since 1950, and it remains the only UN member state without legal provision for divorce. The only exception is concerning Muslims, who are allowed to divorce in certain circumstances according to their religion. For the majority of non-Muslims, the law only allows for annulment of marriages.

== Portugal ==
Portugal's divorce laws were modified in October 2008, liberalizing the process. Divorce may be obtained either by mutual consent; or, at the request of one spouse, if any of the following grounds exist: 1) separation for one year; 2) Any change in the mental faculties of the other spouse when this has lasted for more than a year because of its seriousness, it compromises the possibility of a life together; 3) Absence of one spouse without any news for a period of more than a year; 4) Any other facts that reveal a definitive breakdown of the marriage (e.g. domestic violence). The new 2008 law abolished the legal concept of 'fault' (divórcio-sanção).

Portugal allows two persons to lodge an electronic divorce, to file an electronic request for no-fault collaborative divorce in a non judiciary administrative entity. In specific cases, with no children, real property, alimony, or common address, can be decree as summary within one hour.

== South Africa ==
The law of divorce in South Africa is codified in the Divorce Act, 1979. The law provides for no-fault divorce based on the irretrievable breakdown of the marital relationship. The courts may accept any relevant evidence, but the law specifically mentions one year's separation, adultery, and habitual criminality as factors that may prove irretrievable breakdown. A divorce may also be obtained on the grounds of incurable mental illness for two years or continuous unconsciousness for six months.

Divorce cases are heard in the High Courts or, since 2010, in the regional civil magistrates' courts. A court has the jurisdiction to hear a divorce if either of the spouses is legally domiciled within the geographical jurisdiction of the court, or if either spouse is "ordinarily resident" (i.e. normally lives in) the jurisdiction and has been ordinarily resident in South Africa for at least a year.

Divorce of same-sex couples is subject to the same law as the divorce of opposite-sex couples. Divorce for marriages under customary law is also subject to the civil law, with certain modifications to account for the fact that customary marriages may be polygynous.

Should the divorcees have children, it is necessary to compile a parenting plan which must be signed off by the family advocate.

== Sweden ==
To divorce, in Sweden, the couple can file for divorce together or one party can file alone. If they have children under 16 living at home or one party does not wish to get divorced there is a required contemplation period of 6 to 12 months. During this period, they stay married and the request must be confirmed after the waiting period for the divorce to go through.

== Thailand ==
In Thailand, couples who wish to voluntarily or uncontested divorce must apply for a divorce certificate at any registration offices located nationwide. If they registered a marriage elsewhere, they will need to enrol the marriage under the Thai law at the registration office. The process requires the physical presence of both parties and at least two witnesses. Contested divorce, however, is handled by the Juvenile and Family Court. There are different grounds for a contested divorce. Section 1516 of the Civil and Commercial Code sets out different grounds for a divorce. Couples that have been separated for at least 3 years, either voluntarily or by a court order, can file a lawsuit for the divorce. If one party wilfully abandon another party for at least a year, the latter party can also apply for a judicial divorce. If one party fails to take care of the family, is sentenced to a jail term of at least a year, commits adultery, has a communicable and uncurable disease, suffers insanity for at least 3 years, has a permanent disorder that prevents fultilling the sexual desire of another party, or constantly harm another party or their parents, the other party can also apply for a court divorce.

== United States ==
Divorce in the United States is a matter of state rather than federal law. In recent years, however, more federal legislation has been enacted affecting the rights and responsibilities of divorcing spouses. The laws of the state(s) of residence at the time of divorce govern; all states recognize divorces granted by any other state through the principle of comity, enshrined in Article IV of the U.S. Constitution. All states impose a minimum time of residence in the state. Typically, a county court's family division judges petitions for the dissolution of marriages.

Before the latter decades of the 20th century, a spouse seeking divorce had to show cause and even then might not be able to obtain a divorce. The legalization of no-fault divorce in the United States began in 1969 in California, under legislation signed by then-Governor Ronald Reagan and was completed in 2010, with New York being the last of the fifty states to legalize it. However, some states still require some waiting period before a divorce, typically a 1– to 2–year separation. Fault grounds, when available, are sometimes still sought. This may be done where it reduces the waiting period otherwise required, or possibly in hopes of affecting decisions related to a divorce, such as a child custody, child support, division of marital assets, or alimony. Since the mid-1990s, a few states have enacted covenant marriage laws, which allow couples to voluntarily make a divorce more difficult for themselves to obtain than in the typical no-fault divorce action.

Mediation is a growing way of resolving divorce issues. It tends to be less adversarial (particularly important for any children), more private, less expensive, and faster than traditional litigation. Similar in concept, but with more support than mediation, is collaborative divorce, where both sides are represented by attorneys but commit to negotiating a settlement without engaging in litigation. Some believe that mediation may not be appropriate for all relationships, especially those that included physical or emotional abuse, or an imbalance of power and knowledge about the parties' finances.

States vary in their rules for the division of assets. Some states are "community property" states, others are "equitable distribution" states, and others have elements of both. Most "community property" states start with the presumption that community assets will be divided equally, whereas "equitable distribution" states presume fairness may dictate more or less than half of the assets will be awarded to one spouse or the other. Commonly, assets acquired before marriage are considered the property of the individual and not marital property. and assets acquired after, marital. An attempt is made to assure the welfare of any minor children generally through their dependency. Alimony, also known as "maintenance" or "spousal support", is still being granted in many cases, especially in longer-term marriages.

A decree of divorce will generally not be granted until all questions regarding child care and custody, division of property and assets, and ongoing financial support are resolved.

Due to the complex or onerous divorce requirements in many places, some people seek divorces from other jurisdictions that have easier and faster processes. Most of these places are commonly referred to negatively as "divorce mills." Reno, Nevada was for many years the iconic example of a US divorce mill.

Where people from different countries get married, and one or both then choose to reside in another country, the procedures for divorce can become significantly more complicated. Although most countries make divorce possible, the form of settlement or agreement following divorce may be very different depending on where the divorce takes place.

In some countries, there may be a bias towards the man regarding property settlements, and in others, there may be a bias towards the woman concerning property and custody of any children. One or both parties may seek to divorce in a country that has jurisdiction over them. Normally there will be a residence requirement in the country in which the divorce takes place. See also Divorces obtained by US couples in a different country or jurisdiction above for more information, as applicable globally. In the case of disputed custody, almost all lawyers would strongly advise following the jurisdiction applicable to the dispute, i.e. the country or state of the spouse's residence. Even if not disputed, the spouse could later dispute it and potentially invalidate another jurisdiction's ruling.

Some of the more important aspects of divorce law involve the provisions for any children involved in the marriage, and problems may arise due to abduction of children by one parent, or restriction of contact rights to children. For the conflict of laws issues, see divorce (conflict).

Courts in the United States currently recognize two types of divorce: absolute divorce, known as "divorce a vinculo matrimonii", and limited divorce, known as "divorce a menso et thoro".
