= Fiona Shackleton =

English solicitor and politician

The Right Honourable The Baroness Shackleton of Belgravia LVO
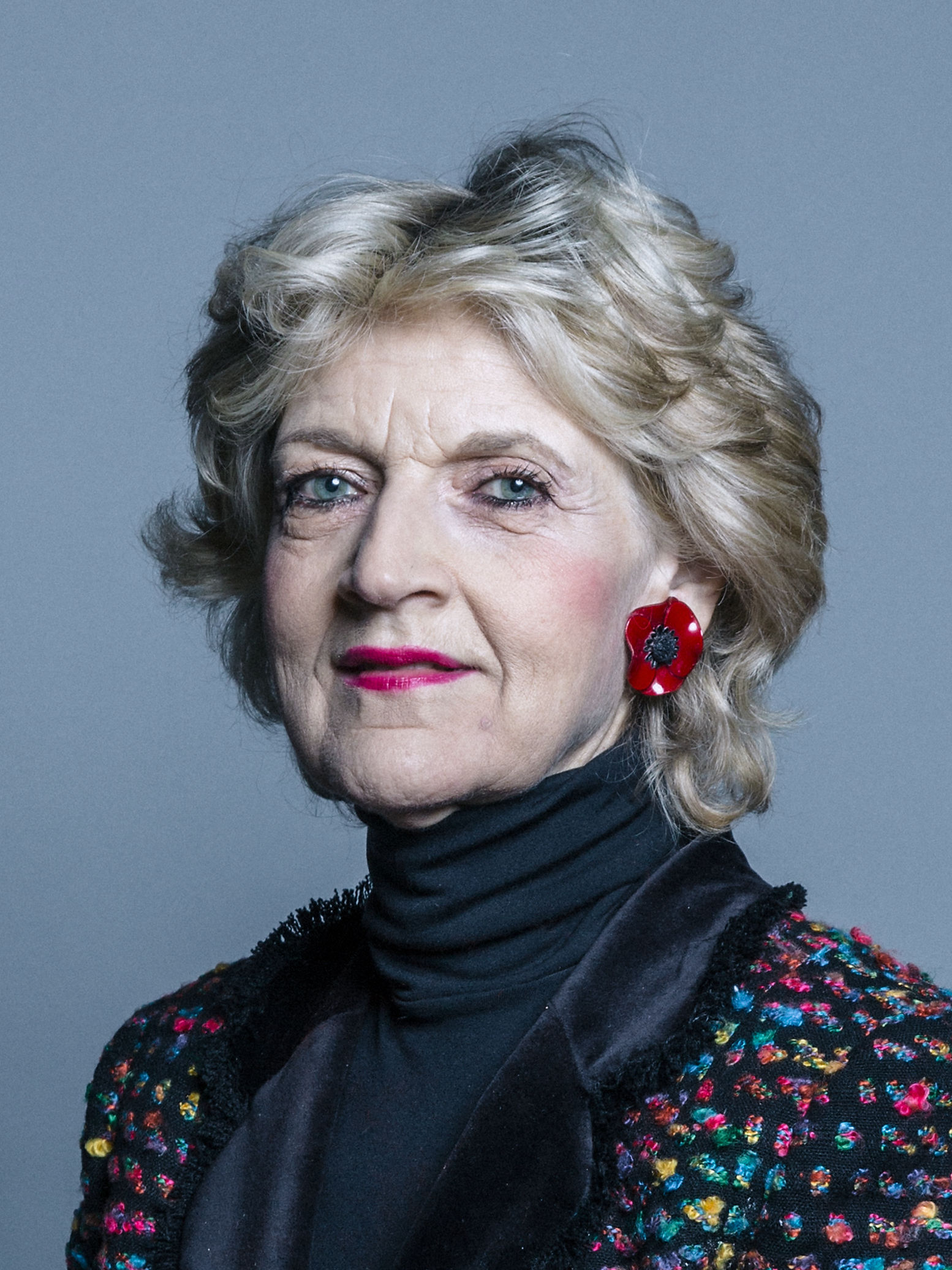

Member of the House of Lords
- Lord Temporal
- Life peerage 21 December 2010

Personal details
- Born: Fiona Sara Charkham; 26 May 1956 (age 70) London, England
- Party: Conservative
- Spouse: Ian Shackleton
- Children: 2
- Education: Benenden School; Exeter University
- Occupation: Solicitor

Fiona Sara Shackleton, Baroness Shackleton of Belgravia, LVO (née Charkham; born 26 May 1956) is an English solicitor and Conservative politician, who has represented members of the British royal family and celebrities, including Paul McCartney, Charles III, Andrew Mountbatten-Windsor, Princess Haya bint Hussein, and Charles Spencer, 9th Earl Spencer. Her charm and resoluteness earned her the nickname "Steel Magnolia".

== Biography ==
Born Fiona Sara Charkham in London, she is the daughter of Jonathan Charkham, an economist and adviser to The Bank of England, and Moira Elizabeth Frances Salmon, daughter of Barnett Alfred and Molly Salmon. Her maternal grandfather, Alfred Salmon, was chairman of the J. Lyons and Co. cornerhouse empire. Through the Salmon family, Shackleton is a cousin to Nigella and Dominic Lawson, and George Monbiot.

Shackleton was educated at Benenden School in Kent. She attended Exeter University, graduating with a third class degree in law. Shackleton then trained as a cordon bleu chef, and became an executive caterer for boardrooms before training to be a solicitor. In July 2010, she was awarded an honorary degree from the University of Exeter in the form of an LL.D.

On 21 December 2010, the Queen created Shackleton a life peer as Baroness Shackleton of Belgravia (in the City of Westminster). She sits as a Conservative in the House of Lords.

Shackleton supported the research by the University of Exeter examining compatibility and the ten key aspects of a successful relationship (named the Shackleton Project). The research was published in July 2018.

=== Legal career ===
Shackleton qualified as a solicitor in 1980, and by 1986 she had become a partner at Farrer and Co, the firm of solicitors employed by the British royal family. In the same year Shackleton and other international family lawyers, including Jane Simpson and Raymond Tooth, co-founded the International Academy of Matrimonial Lawyers, an invitation-only organisation which now consists of over 500 of the world's leading family lawyers. Her first high-profile case was that of the Duke and Duchess of York.

Shackleton joined Payne Hicks Beach in 2001 as a partner. Shackleton is reputed to have fallen out of royal favour in the aftermath of the Paul Burrell affair and the suggestions of a cover-up over allegations of a homosexual rape within the royal household put Shackleton, in her own words, "under pressure for a solution to be reached more speedily than I was able to achieve". She was criticised in the Peat Report on the proceedings.

In the 2006 New Year Honours, she was made a Lieutenant of the Royal Victorian Order (LVO) and remains solicitor for the Prince of Wales and the Duke of Sussex.

In March 2012, one of Shackleton's former clients filed a negligence claim against her for incorrect advice on a child support case. The former client states that due to this erroneous advice he lost out on more than £260,000. Shackleton charged over £95,000 in fees for the advice. The case was subsequently dropped and the client paid his own costs.

==== Famous cases ====
Shackleton's high-profile cases include:

- The Duke and Duchess of York: where Shackleton represented the Duke. The Duchess was able to negotiate a £3 million settlement.
- The Prince and Princess of Wales: where Shackleton represented the Prince. The Princess was able to negotiate a £17 million settlement and observers saw the outcome as a creditable draw. On the same date that Buckingham Palace announced to the public that the Prince and Princess had reached a settlement, the Queen issued letters patent to regulate the styles and titles of former members of the royal family after divorce. Information about those letters patent was included by the Palace in the same press release that contained the announcement of the divorce agreement. In accordance with those letters patent, Diana lost her style of Royal Highness when the decree absolute of divorce was issued. The forfeiture of the style of Royal Highness is often attributed to the diligence of Shackleton, but styles of members of the royal family are governed by the prerogative of the sovereign.
- Paul McCartney and Heather Mills: in which Shackleton represented the former Beatle, and secured leading QC Nicholas Mostyn before Mills's solicitor Anthony Julius, leading to their being known during the case by the media as the "legal dream team". Mills described Shackleton in an interview with Larry King thus: "There's this nasty woman – Fiona Shackleton. She wants to drag it out as long as possible to fill her pockets and she's said some pretty mean things when I was in a wheelchair." At the final settlement hearing, Mills poured a jug of water over Shackleton's head.
- Claire and Thierry Henry: in which Shackleton represented wife Claire Merry, whose marriage broke down after the Arsenal striker left for Barcelona.
- John Cleese and Alyce Cleese: in which she represented Alyce Faye. Cleese said afterwards, "What I find so unfair is that if we both died today, her children would get much more than mine".
- Sheikh Mohammed bin Rashid Al Maktoum and Princess Haya bint Hussein: in which Shackleton represented Princess Haya.
- The Earl and Countess Spencer: in which Shackleton is to represent Lord Spencer.

=== Personal life ===
Shackleton is married to Ian Ridgeway Shackleton, who runs a business called The Chatham Archive & Document Storage Company, and who is related to Antarctic explorer Ernest Shackleton. The couple have two daughters.

== See also ==
- Edward Shackleton, Baron Shackleton
- James Stewart
- Marilyn Stowe
- Jane Simpson
- Collaborative law
