= Jane Simpson (solicitor) =

British family lawyer

Jane Simpson is a family lawyer who specialised in complex ancillary relief cases and those involving children. Simpson is a trained marriage guidance counselor and collaborative lawyer. She was the founder and head of the family law department at Manches LLP, a UK law firm, as well as its chairwoman. making her, as of her appointment, one of few women who have led City of London law firms.

Simpson was admitted Solicitor of Supreme Court 1967. She was a fellow of the International Academy of Matrimonial Lawyers (IAML). In 2008, Simpson was one of the founders of the group, Collaborative Family Law (formerly the Central London Collaborative Forum) which aims to bring collaborative law to high value cases. In 1982 Simpson co-founded, and from 1993 to 1995 chaired, the Solicitors' Family Law Association (now Resolution). It is the national organisation for solicitors specialising in family law and now has over 5,000 members. She also served as a member of the Lord Chancellor’s Family Law Advisory Board and was a non executive director and Vice Chairman of the Tavistock and Portman NHS Foundation Trust. Jane was the chair at Manches until her retirement in 2011. In 2013, Manches LLP merged with Pennington to form Pennington Manches.

Jane Simpson was the daughter of Sidney and Judith Manches, the first husband and wife team in the UK to practise law in partnership.

== See also ==
- James Stewart (solicitor)
- Collaborative Family Law
