= Collaborative Law Institute of Texas =

American nonprofit organization

- Founded: 2003
- Location: Dallas
- Region served: Texas
- Services: Collaborative law training

The Collaborative Law Institute of Texas (CLI-TX) is a non-profit organization, founded in 2003 and headquartered in Dallas, to promote collaborative law as an alternative to traditional litigation in solving divorce disputes. The organization's membership includes lawyers, financial professionals, and mental health professionals who practice collaborative law and/or serve on collaborative law teams.

== History ==
In 1999, as collaborative law was gaining notice around the nation as an alternative to traditional divorce, Dallas attorneys John McShane and Larry Hance invited Pauline Tesler (a collaborative law proponent based in Mill Valley, Calif.) to the State Bar of Texas’ Advanced Family Law Course, an annual four-day educational seminar for as many as 2,000 Texas family law attorneys, to speak on collaborative law.

Houston-based family lawyer Harry Tindall spearheaded efforts to make collaborative law an option for divorcing couples in Texas. In 2001, as a result of Tindall’s efforts, Texas became the first state in the United States to adopt a collaborative law statute. The legislation termed a "progressive, trends-setting legal model," became official in September 2001.

In 2002, McShane and Hance recruited a group of family lawyers representing some of Texas’ most populous cities and metropolitan areas to found a statewide organization dedicated to collaborative law practice in Texas. That October, the 2nd annual International Academy of Collaborative Professionals (IACP) Conference convened in Galveston, bringing collaborative law practitioners from throughout North America to Texas. The conference included presentations on marketing from the Collaborative Law Council of Wisconsin, including details on how law marketing consultant Elizabeth Ferris (of Milwaukee-based Ferris Consulting) helped the nascent organization develop awareness of collaborative law in Wisconsin.

The Texas lawyers then invited Ferris to participate in a two-day retreat in May 2003, to help create the strategic plan for the new Collaborative Law Institute of Texas, which included the creation of a membership structure and training programs for collaborative law practitioners and family lawyers, financial professionals, and mental health professionals interested in collaborative law.

The nascent organization then began its efforts in educating the public on collaborative law, including releasing a study showing significant reductions in time and money spent in collaborative divorce, when compared to a traditional courtroom divorce. The organization also grew its numbers of lawyers, mental health professionals, and financial professionals in Texas seeking to practice collaborative law, and demonstrated that it could be used in cases involving business disputes as well as divorce disputes.

== Committees ==
Collaborative Law Institute of Texas maintains several committees and sub-committees. Committees include Membership, Marketing, Resources (with Forms & PA, Protocols, Book Task Force, Website, Blog, and Newsletter sub-committees), Professional Training and Education, Community Building (with Practice Groups, IACP, State Bar, and New Partners sub-committees), and Ad Hoc (with Scholarship and Fundraising sub-committees).

== Education ==
The Collaborative Law Institute of Texas, in collaboration with the State Bar of Texas, hosts an annual educational conference on collaborative law, involving a number of the organization’s lawyers, financial professionals, and mental health professionals, as well as guests. The conference, typically held in March, also marks the start of the term for new Board of Trustees officers. The 2013 edition of the event featured a special presentation by Dallas-based financier T. Boone Pickens, a proponent of collaborative law and a long-time supporter of the Collaborative Law Institute of Texas.

The organization, in addition to hosting its annual conference, also presents a half-day course on collaborative law as part of the State Bar of Texas’ annual Advanced Family Law Course. The conference, held each August in San Antonio, commemorated its 40th year in 2014.

The organization's partnership with the State Bar of Texas also includes the State Bar creating a Collaborative Law Section in May 2010.

The organization also provides CLE education programs and other programming throughout the year, coordinated by CLI-TX members and held in a number of Texas cities.

== Legislative Efforts ==
In addition to Texas becoming the first state in the United States to adopt a collaborative law statute in 2001, Texas adopted the Uniform Family Collaborative Law Act (also known as the Uniform Collaborative Law Act) in 2011. The UFCLA, detailing an expanded list of provisions for collaborative law practice, follows from the 2009 UCLA adopted by the Uniform Law Commission, and Texas is one of eight states to have adopted the legislation as of June 2013. As with the original 2001 legislation, Harry Tindall was instrumental in lobbying the Texas Legislature to pass the UFCLA; they did so unanimously, and Texas Gov. Rick Perry signed the bill into law on June 17, 2011.
