= Marital rape laws by country =

Marital rape illegal Marital rape legal 'Marital rape' legal, but forced marital sex still punishable. Legal status unclear

This article provides an overview of marital rape laws by country.

== Overview ==
Marital rape is illegal in many countries. Throughout history until the 1970s, most states granted a husband the right to have sex with his wife whenever he so desired, as an integral part of marriage. However, in the 20th century and especially since the 1970s, women's rights groups initiated the anti-rape movement, demanding that they be given sexual autonomy over their own bodies, including within marriage. These rights have increasingly been recognised, and consequently marital rape has been criminalised by about 150 countries as of 2019. In some cases, marital rape is explicitly criminalised, in other cases the law makes no distinction between rape by one's husband or rape by anyone else. In a few countries, marital rape was criminalised due to a court decision. In some countries, the prevailing logic goes that there is no such thing as 'marital rape', since the verb 'to rape' (Latin: rapere) originally meant 'to steal' or 'to seize and carry off' (although its meaning shifted during the Middle Ages to 'violently abducting a woman for the purpose of forced coitus'), and it is impossible to steal something you already 'own', and a husband 'owns' his wife in marriage. However, in a few of those countries that do not criminalise marital rape, such as Malaysia, a husband can still be punished if he uses violence in order to have sex with his wife.

In India, There was made an Act named Prevention of Women from Domestic Violence Act, 2005 which came into effect in 2006. The Act also includes Sexual Abuse which is defined as any sexual act which harms the dignity of a woman. Marital rape was included in the sexual abuse.

After the passage of the Law - Protection of Women from Domestic Violence, 2005, the percentage of females who faced sexual violence by their husbands decreased from 10% in 2005-06 to 6% in 2019-21.

== A ==
Country	Criminalised	Notes
Afghanistan	No	The 2009 Law on Elimination of Violence against Women (EVAW) does not exclude spousal rape in its section on Sexual Assault. (Note: Afghanistan: Law on Elimination of Violence against Women (EVAW) (2009)) However, Article 134 (2) of the Shia Personal Status Law states "It is the duty of the wife to defer to her husband's inclination for sexual enjoyment". (Note: Afghanistan: Shia Personal Status Law (2008))
Albania	Explicitly criminalised	The Criminal Code was amended in 2012 and 2013 to criminalise marital rape. (Article 102.) (Note: Albania: Criminal Code (1995, as amended 2015.))
Algeria	No	The law criminalises rape but does not address spousal rape. The Penal Code does not explicitly exclude marital rape from the definition of rape, (Note: Algeria Code Penal (2009) (in French)) however the Algerian Family Code requires a wife to obey her husband
Andorra	Yes	Rape, including spousal rape can be punished by up to 15 years imprisonment. The Penal Code does not exclude marital rape from its definition of rape (Article 145). (Note: Andorra Code Pénal (2005) (in French))
Angola	Explicitly criminalised	Rape, including spousal rape, is illegal and punishable by up to eight years' imprisonment. Article 170 of the Código Penal explicitly includes a spouse in its definition of rape. (Note: Angola Código Penal (in Portuguese))
Antigua and Barbuda	Explicitly excluded	Article 3 (1) of the Sexual Offences Act, 1995, includes in the definition of rape: "with a female person who is not his wife".
Argentina	Explicitly criminalised	Rape of men and women, including spousal rape, can be punished by imprisonment from six months to up to 20 years. Spousal rape is criminalised by Article 5 (3) of the Law of Comprehensive Protection of Women (Ley de Protección Integral a las Mujeres), 2009. (Note: Argentina; Law of Comprehensive Protection of Women (2009) (in Spanish))
Armenia	Yes	Rape is a criminal offense, and conviction carries a maximum sentence of 15 years; general rape statutes (Article 138 of the Criminal Code) (Note: Armenia: Criminal Code (2003)) applied to the prosecution of spousal rape.
Australia	Explicitly criminalised	Criminalisation in Australia began with the state of New South Wales in 1981, followed by all other states from 1985 to 1992. The government enforced the law effectively. The laws of individual states and territories provide the penalties for rape. The first Australian state to deal with marital rape was South Australia, under the progressive initiatives of Premier Don Dunstan, which in 1976 partially removed the exemption. Section 73 of the Criminal Law Consolidation Act Amendment Act 1976 (SA) read: "No person shall, by reason only of the fact that he is married to some other person, be presumed to have consented to sexual intercourse with that other person".
Austria	Yes	Spousal rape can be punished by up to 15 years imprisonment, and was first criminalised in 1989. The Criminal Code (§ 201) does not explicitly excludes marital rape from the definition of rape. (Note: Austria: Criminal Code (1974, as amended 2015) (in German))
Azerbaijan	Yes	Spousal rape is illegal, but observers stated police did not effectively investigate such claims. The Criminal Code does not exclude marital rape from its definition of rape (Articles 108, 149). (Note: Azerbaijan Criminal Code (2003))

== B ==
Country	Criminalised	Notes
The Bahamas	Explicitly excluded	Rape of men or women is illegal, but the law does not protect against spousal rape, except if the couple is separated or in the process of divorce, or if there is a restraining order in place. Section 3 of the Sexual Offences Act, 2010, includes "person who is not his spouse" in the definition of rape. (Note: The Bahamas: Sexual Offences Act 2010))
Bahrain	Explicitly excluded (Note: Bahrain: Penal Code (1976) (in Arabic))	Rape is illegal, although the criminal code allows an alleged rapist to marry his victim to avoid punishment. The law does not address spousal rape. Article 353 of the Penal Code explicitly excludes spousal rape.
Bangladesh	No	The law prohibits rape of a female by a male and physical spousal abuse, but the law excludes marital rape if the female is above 13. Section 375 (Of Rape) of the Penal Code includes the exception: "Sexual intercourse by a man with his own wife, the wife not being under thirteen years of age, is not rape." (Note: Bangladesh: Penal Code (1860, amended to 2008)) This has recently been challenged and ruled against, possibly due to poor drafting
Barbados	Explicitly criminalised	The Sexual Offences (Amendment) Act 2016 modified section 3 (4) of the Sexual Offences Act 1992, removing the previous "marital exemption" and replacing it with explicit criminalisation of marital rape. (Note: Barbados: Sexual Offences (Amendment) Act 2016)
Belarus	Yes	Article 166 of the Criminal Code (Note: Belarus: Criminal Code (1999, amended to 2017) (in Russian)) criminalises rape in general but does not include separate provisions on marital rape. Prosecutions for marital rape are rare and it is often regarded as a private rather than criminal issue.
Belgium	Yes	Marital rape was criminalised by court decision in 1979. The criminal code was amended in 1989 to treat marital rape the same as other forms of rape. (Code Pénal Art. 375) (Note: Belgium: Code Pénal (1876, amended to 2018) (in French))
Belize	Explicitly criminalised	Article 46 of the Criminal Code (Note: Belize: Criminal Code) criminalises rape of men or women, including spousal rape. The code states that a person convicted of rape shall be sentenced to imprisonment for eight years to life.
Benin	Explicitly criminalised	Article 2 of the 2011 Law Portant prévention et répression des violences faites aux femmes (For prevention and repression of violence against women), (Note: Benin: Portant prévention et répression des violences faites aux femmes (2011) (in French)) explicitly prohibits spousal rape and provides the maximum penalty of 5 years imprisonment for conviction of raping a domestic partner.
Bhutan	Explicitly criminalised	Spousal rape is illegal and prosecuted as a misdemeanor. (Penal Code Sec. 199 & 200) (Note: Bhutan: Penal Code)
Bolivia	Explicitly criminalised	In 2013 the government passed the Law Guaranteeing Women a Life Free from Violence (Ley Integral Para Garantizar A Las Mujeres Una Vida Libre De Violencia). Its provisions included the repeal of the marital rape exemption in the Penal Code, and making rape by a spouse an aggravating factor when sentencing, extending imprisonment by 5 years. (Note: Bolivia: Ley Integral Para Garantizar A Las Mujeres Una Vida Libre De Violencia (2013) (in Spanish))
Bosnia and Herzegovina	Yes	The maximum penalty for rape, regardless of gender, including spousal rape, is 15 years in prison. The failure of police to treat spousal rape as a serious offense inhibited the effective enforcement of the law. The 2003 Penal Code removed "marital exemption" from Article 203 (Rape). (Note: Bosnia and Herzegovina: Penal Code (2003))
Botswana	Customary law	The law criminalises rape but does not recognize spousal rape as a crime. Customary law holds that sex within marriage is consensual.
Brazil	Explicitly criminalised	Since 2005, (Note: Brazil: LAW No. 11,106, OF MARCH 28, 2005 (in Portuguese)) the law criminalises rape of men or women, including spousal rape. (Articles 213 & 226 of the Criminal Code) (Note: Brazil: Criminal Code (1984, amended to 2018) (in Portuguese))
Brunei	Explicitly excluded	The law does not criminalise spousal rape and Article 375 of the Penal Code (Note: Brunei: Penal Code (2016)) explicitly states that sexual intercourse by a man with his wife is not rape, as long as she is not younger than 13 years.
Bulgaria	Yes	The law criminalises rape (Article 152 of the Criminal Code). (Note: Bulgaria: Criminal Code (1968, amended to 2018) (in Bulgarian)) While authorities could prosecute spousal rape under the general rape statute, they rarely did so.
Burkina Faso	Explicitly criminalised	In 2015 the government passed the Law on the Prevention and Repression of Violence Against Women and Girls and Support for Victims. Conviction of rape is punishable by five to ten years' imprisonment. Marital rape is covered by this law.
Burundi	Explicitly criminalised	Spousal rape was criminalised in 2016 by the Loi N° 1/13 du 22 septembre 2016 portant prévention, protection des victimes et répression des Violences Basées sur le Genre (Articles 2i & 27), (Note: Burundi: Loi N° 1/13 du 22 septembre 2016 portant prévention, protection des victimes et répression des Violences Basées sur le Genre (in French)) with penalties of up to 30 years' imprisonment. The government did not enforce the law uniformly, and rape and other domestic and sexual violence continued to be serious problems.

== C ==
Country	Criminalised	Notes
Cameroon	Customary law	The law does not address spousal rape, but does not exclude marital rape. Judges accept the principle husbands have "disciplinary rights" over their wives, including when they refuse to have sexual relations. It is also accepted that during marriage the woman implicitly consents to sexual intercourse whenever the husband wishes.
Canada	Explicitly criminalised	Articles 271 & 278 of the Criminal Code (Note: Canada: Criminal Code (1985, amended to 2018)) criminalise rape of men or women, including spousal rape, as sexual assault, and the government enforced the law effectively. Marital rape was first criminalised in 1983.
Cambodia	Yes	Spousal rape is not specifically mentioned in the penal code (articles 239–245), (Note: Cambodia: Criminal Code) but the underlying conduct can be prosecuted as "rape", "causing injury", or "indecent assault". Charges for spousal rape under the penal code and the domestic violence law were rare. Marital rape was criminalised in 2005.
Cape Verde	Explicitly criminalised	Spousal rape is implicitly covered by the 2001 gender-based violence law; (Note: Cape Verde: Act No. 84/VII/2011 on Gender Based Violence (2011) (in Portuguese)) penalties for conviction range from one to five years' imprisonment.
Central African Republic	Customary law	The law prohibits rape, although it does not specifically prohibit spousal rape. Customary law holds that sex within marriage is consensual.
Chad	Customary law	The law does not specifically address spousal rape. Customary law holds that sex within marriage is consensual.
Chile	Explicitly criminalised	The law criminalises rape of men or women, including spousal rape (Penal Code art. 369). (Note: Chile: Código Penal (1874, amended to 2018) (in Spanish)) Penalties for rape range from 5 to 15 years' imprisonment. Marital rape was criminalised in 1999.
China	No	The law does not safeguard same-sex couples or victims of marital rape.
Colombia	Explicitly criminalised	Although prohibited by law, rape, including spousal rape (art. 211(5) of Ley 599 de 2000), (Note: Colombia: Ley 599 de 2000 (2000, amended to 2014)) remained a serious problem. Marital rape was criminalised in 1996,
Comoros	Explicitly criminalised	In 2014, Loi N° 14-036/AU dealing with violence against women was promulgated, amongst its provisions (art. 1) was the criminalisation of marital rape.
Democratic Republic of Congo	Customary law	The legal definition of rape does not include spousal rape. Customary law holds that sex within marriage is consensual.
Republic of the Congo	Customary law	Customary law holds that sex within marriage is consensual. Women's rights groups have reported that spousal rape was common.
Costa Rica	Explicitly criminalised	The law criminalises rape of men or women, including spousal rape (Ley de Penalización de la Violencia contra las Mujeres No. 8589 art.29) (Note: Costa Rica: Ley de Penalización de la Violencia contra las Mujeres No. 8589 (2007) (in Spanish)) and domestic violence, and provides penalties from 10 to 18 years in prison for rape. The judicial branch generally enforced the law.
Croatia	Explicitly criminalised	Conviction of rape, including spousal rape, is punishable by up to 15 years imprisonment. (Articles 152 & 154(1)(1) of the Criminal Code) (Note: Croatia: Criminal Code (in Croatian))
Cuba	Explicitly criminalised	The law specifically criminalises rape of women, including spousal rape, and separately criminalises "lascivious abuse" against both genders. The government enforced both laws. Penalties for rape are at least four years' imprisonment.
Cyprus	Explicitly criminalised	The law criminalises rape, including spousal rape (sec.5 The Family Violence (Prevention and Protection of Victims) Law), (Note: Cyprus: The Family Violence (Prevention and Protection of Victims) Law (2000, updated to 2017) (in Greek)) with a maximum sentence of life in prison for violations. The government enforced the law effectively. Marital rape was criminalised in 1994. Spousal rape is also criminalzed in the area administered by Turkish Cypriots (Turkish Republic of Northern Cyprus).
Czech Republic	Yes	The explicit exclusion of marital rape was removed from Czechoslovak penal code in 1950. Since then, it is punishable as other cases of rape. The current Czech law prohibits rape, including spousal rape, and provides a penalty of 2 to 15 years in prison for violations. (Section 185 of the Penal Code) (Note: Czech Republic: Penal Code (2009) (in Czech))

== D ==
Country	Criminalised	Notes
Denmark	Yes	The law criminalises rape against women or men (the statute is gender neutral), including spousal rape, and domestic violence. Penalties for rape include imprisonment for up to 12 years. (Section 216 of the Criminal Code) (Note: Denmark: Criminal Code (2011) (in Danish))
Djibouti	No	The law includes sentences of up to 20 years' imprisonment for rape but does not address spousal rape.
Dominica	Explicitly criminalised	The Sexual Offences (Amendment) Act 2016 repealed the previous "marital exclusions" of the rape law and introduced a specific marital rape section [s3 (3)] to the Sexual Offences Act. (Note: Dominica: Sexual Offences (Amendment) Act (2016))
Dominican Republic	Explicitly criminalised	The law criminalises rape of men or women, including spousal rape, and other forms of violence against women, such as incest and sexual aggression. The sentences for conviction of rape range from 10 to 15 years in prison and a fine of 100,000 to 200,000 pesos. In 1997, Ley 24-97 (Sobre Violencia Intrafamiliar, de Genero y Sexual) (Note: Dominican Republic: Ley 24-97 (Sobre Violencia Intrafamiliar, de Genero y Sexual) (1997) (in Spanish)) modified the Penal Code to explicitly criminalise spousal rape (art. 332). (Note: Dominican Republic Código Penal (2007) (in Spanish))

== E ==
Country	Criminalised	Notes
East Timor	Explicitly criminalised	Although rape, including marital rape, is a crime punishable by up to 20 years in prison, failures to investigate or prosecute cases of alleged rape and sexual abuse were common. In 2010, Article 2(2)b) of Law No. 7/2010 on Domestic Violence, extended the definition of rape (art. 172 of the Criminal Code) to explicitly include marital rape. (Note: East Timor: Lei Contra a Violência Doméstica (2010) (in Portuguese)) (Note: East Timor: Código Penal (2009) (in Portuguese))
Ecuador	Explicitly criminalised	The law criminalises rape of men or women, including spousal rape and domestic violence. Rape is punishable with penalties of up to 22 years in prison. (Articles 155-158 of the Código Orgánico Integral Penal). (Note: Ecuador: Código Orgánico Integral Penal (1895, amended to 2014) (in Spanish))
Egypt	Case Law	The law prohibits rape, prescribing criminal penalties of 15 to 25 years' imprisonment, or life imprisonment for cases of rape involving armed abduction. Spousal rape is not illegal, based on a 1928 Court of Cassation ruling that "a wife cannot withhold sex from her husband without a valid reason according to sharia".
El Salvador	Unclear	Marital rape is not specifically addressed by statue. The World Bank's 2018 " "Women, Business and the Law" report states that the country's general rape laws apply to marital rape. The 2017 El Salvador Country Report on Human Rights Practices suggests this is only at a judge's discretion. An earlier (2011) report, the "UN Womens Justice Report" states there are no laws covering marital rape.
Equatorial Guinea	Explicitly excluded	Marital rape is explicitly excluded from the definition of rape within the law.
Eritrea	Explicitly excluded	Article 307 of the Penal Code Explicitly excludes marital rape except where spouses are not living together. (Note: Eritrea: Penal Code (2015))
Eswatini	Explicitly criminalised	The 2018 Sexual Offences and Domestic Violence Act, Section 151, provides that "any relationship, previous or existing, shall not provide a defence to any offence under this Act", thus criminalising marital rape. As of 2021, the Amended Marriage Act, which would further criminalise marital rape, had not been promulgated by the Government. However, the first arrest of a man on the charge of marital rape under the 2018 Sexual Offences Act took place in January 2020.
Ethiopia	Explicitly excluded	Marital rape is excluded from the definition of rape in Article 620 of the Criminal Code, which limits rape to "outside wedlock". (Note: Ethiopia: Criminal Code (2005))
Estonia	Explicitly criminalised	The law criminalises rape, including spousal rape (Criminal Code §58(2) & 141), (Note: Estonia: Criminal Code (2001, amended to 2014)) and physical abuse, including domestic violence. The penalty for rape, including spousal rape, is imprisonment for up to 15 years.

== F ==
Country	Criminalised	Notes
Fiji	Case law	Rape (including spousal rape), domestic abuse, incest, and indecent assault are significant problems; there was a large increase in the reported number of rape cases in 2017, due at least in part to greater awareness that a spouse can be charged with rape of his/her partner. The law provides for a maximum punishment of life imprisonment for rape. The definition of rape in §207 of the Crimes Decree does not explicitly include spousal rape (Note: Fiji: Crimes Decree (2009)) and it is not recognised by customary law. However, in Dutt v The State [2006], the court ruled that spousal rape is a crime under the rape law.
Finland	Yes	The law criminalises rape, including spousal rape, and the government enforced the law effectively. Rape is punishable by up to four years' imprisonment. If the offender used violence, the offense is considered aggravated, and the penalty may be more severe. Marital rape was criminalised in 1994.
France	Explicitly criminalised	The law criminalises rape, including spousal rape, and domestic violence, and the government generally enforced the law effectively. The Court of Cassation authorized prosecution of spouses for rape or sexual assault in 1990. In 1994, Law 94-89 criminalised marital rape; a second law, passed 4 April 2006, makes rape by a partner an aggravating circumstance in prosecuting rape. (Article 222-24(11) of the Criminal Code) (Note: France: Code pénal (2016) (in French)) In 2025, the ECHR ruled in H.W. v. France that under French law and the European Convention on Human Rights, "marital duties" do not and cannot include an obligation to have sex with one's spouse without one's consent (which is not presumed to exist within marriage), overruling earlier case law from lower courts in France.

== G ==
Country	Criminalised	Notes
Gabon	Explicitly criminalised	Marital rape was criminalised in 2013 and the penalties on conviction are five- to ten-year imprisonment sentences and a very heavy fine. Authorities seldom prosecute rape cases.
Gambia	Yes	Although spousal rape was widespread;, police generally considered it a domestic issue outside its jurisdiction.
Georgia	Explicitly criminalised	Marital rape is Explicitly criminalised by Articles 11-1 & 137 of the Criminal Code (Note: Georgia: Criminal Code (1999, updated to 2016))
Germany	Yes	The law criminalises rape, including spousal rape, and provides penalties of up to 15 years in prison. The "Marital exemption" was removed by a revised law in 1997.
Ghana	Yes	The "marital exemption" was removed from the country's rape laws in 2007.
Greece	Explicitly criminalised	Rape, including spousal rape, is a crime punishable by penalties ranging from 5 to 20 years' imprisonment. Law 3500/2006, entitled "For combating domestic violence", which punishes marital rape, entered into force on 24 October 2006. (Articles 1 & 8) (Note: Greece: For combating domestic violence (2006) (in Greek))
Grenada	Explicitly criminalised	The law criminalises rape of men or women, including spousal rape, and stipulates a sentence of flogging or up to 30 years' imprisonment for a conviction of any nonconsensual form of sex. Marital rape was criminalised in a 2012 amendment to the Criminal Code.
Guatemala	Explicitly criminalised	The law criminalises rape of men or women, including spousal rape, and sets penalties between five and 50 years in prison. Police had minimal training or capacity to investigate sexual crimes or assist survivors of such crimes, and the government did not enforce the law effectively. Spousal rape was criminalised in 2009 by Articles 28 & 30 of Ley Contra la Violencia Sexual, Explotación y Trata de Personas (Law against Sexual Violence, Exploitation and Trafficking in Persons). (Note: Guatemala: Law against Sexual Violence, Exploitation and Trafficking in Persons (2009) (in Spanish))
Guinea	No	The law criminalises rape and domestic violence, but both occurred frequently, and authorities rarely prosecuted perpetrators. The law does not address spousal rape.
Guinea-Bissau	Explicitly criminalised	The law prohibits rape, including spousal rape, and provides penalties for conviction of 2 to 12 years in prison; however, the government did not effectively enforce the law. Spousal rape was criminalised in 2014 by Arts. 4(f) & 25 of Law No. 6/2014.
Guyana	Explicitly criminalised	Marital rape was criminalised by §3 & 7 the Sexual Offenses Act 2010. (Note: Guyana: Sexual Offenses Act (2010, amended to 2013))

== H ==
Country	Criminalised	Notes
Haiti	No	While the law prohibits rape of men or women, it does not recognize spousal rape as a crime.
Honduras	Explicitly criminalised	The law criminalises all forms of rape of men or women, including spousal rape, but unlike other rapes is not a "public crime" and thereby requires the survivors to complain for prosecution to occur. Marital rape was explicitly criminalised in 2005 by arts. 140 & 141 of the Código Penal. (Note: Honduras: Código Penal (1983, amended to 2017) (in Spanish))
Hong Kong	Explicitly criminalised	Section 117(1B) of the Crimes Ordinance, introduced in 2002, states that "unlawful sexual intercourse (非法性交、非法的性交) does not exclude sexual intercourse that a man has with his wife". (Note: Hong Kong: Crimes Ordinance (1971, amended to 2017))
Hungary	Explicitly criminalised	Rape of men or women, including spousal rape, is illegal. The "marital exemption" was dropped from law in 1997. Secs.197(3)(b) and 459(14) of the Criminal Code explicitly criminalise spousal rape. (Note: Hungary: Criminal Code (2012))

== I ==
Country	Criminalised	Notes
Iceland	Explicitly criminalised	Art. 70 of the Almenn hegningarlög (Penal Code), introduced in 2006, makes a relationship between the perpetrator and victim an aggravating factor. (Note: Iceland: Almenn hegningarlög (1940, amended to 2017) (in Icelandic))
India	Marital rape explicitly excluded from the legal definition of rape but Wife can file case under Domestic Violence act	See also: Rape in India § Marital rape, and Violence against women in India § Marital rape Section 63 of the Bharatiya Nyaya Sanhita (BNS) considers forced sex in marriages as a crime only when the wife is under the age of 18. Rape of an estranged or separated wife is a criminal offense for up to seven years under Section 67. Nevertheless, occasionally different high courts across India have questioned the exception granted to married men in the rape laws. Supreme Court of India is yet to decide the validity of such an exception. The central government has claimed that a husband who forces his wife to have sexual relations with him can be prosecuted under different provisions of law. Protection of Women from Domestic Violence Act 2005 provides protection to wife who is victim of Marital rape or any form of Sexual violence .
Indonesia	Not clearly described	Art. 285 of the Penal Code includes "out of marriage" in the definition of rape; (Note: Indonesia: Penal Code) however, marital rape is considered a form of domestic violence under arts. 5, 8, 46, 47 and 53 of the Law Regarding the Elimination of Violence in the Household, 2004. (Note: Indonesia: Law Regarding the Elimination of Violence in the Household (2004))
Iran	Explicitly excluded	Rape is illegal and subject to strict penalties, including death, but it remained a problem. The law considers sex within marriage consensual by definition (Penal Code art. 221) (Note: Iran: Penal Code {2012}) and, therefore, does not address spousal rape, including in cases of forced marriage.
Iraq	No	Art. 393(1) of the Penal Code criminalises sexual intercourse and buggery without consent without reference to marriage, since Article 394 criminalises the same acts outside of marriage for underage people. Article 398 (previously Article 427) is a marry-your-rapist law: it allows authorities to drop a rape case if the perpetrator marries the victim. The law permits a maximum sentence of life imprisonment if the victim dies.
Ireland	Yes	The law criminalises rape, including spousal rape, and the government enforces the law. Most persons convicted receive prison sentences of 5 to 12 years. Section 5 of the Criminal Law (Rape) (Amendment) Act 1990 removed "marital exemption" from Irish law. (Note: Ireland: Criminal Law (Rape) (Amendment) Act (1990))
Israel	Case Law	Rape, including spousal rape, is a felony punishable by 16 years in prison, or up to 20 years' imprisonment. The Israeli Supreme Court affirmed that marital rape is a crime in a 1980 decision, citing law based on the Talmud
Italy	Explicitly criminalised	The prescribed penalty for rape, including spousal rape, is 5 to 12 years in prison. In 1976 in Sentenza n. 12857 del 1976, the Supreme Court ruled that "the spouse who compels the other spouse to carnal knowledge by violence or threats commits the crime of carnal violence" (as rape was then known). In 2013, art. 609-ter(5-quarter) was added to the Criminal Code which made rape by somebody in an 'affective relationship' with the victim an aggravating factor. (Note: Italy: Criminal Code (amended to 2017) (in Italian))
Ivory Coast	Yes	The law prohibits rape and provides for prison terms of 5 to 20 years for perpetrators. The Penal does not specifically include spousal rape in the definition of rape. (Note: Ivory Coast: Penal Code (in French))

== J ==
Country	Criminalised	Notes
Jamaica	Explicitly excluded	The Sexual Offences Act, Sec. 5(3) (Note: Jamaica: Sexual Offences Act (2011)) criminalises spousal rape only when spouses have separated or begun proceedings to dissolve the marriage; when the husband is under a court order not to molest or cohabit with his wife; or when the husband knows he suffers from a sexually transmitted infection.
Japan	Yes	The law criminalises all forms of rape involving force against women. The law does not allow spousal rape.
Jordan	Explicitly excluded	The law stipulates a sentence of at least 10 years of imprisonment with hard labor for the rape of a girl or woman 15 years of age or older. Art. 292(a)(1) of the Penal code explicitly excludes marital rape from the definition of rape. (Note: Jordan: Jordan (1960, amended to 2011) (in Arabic))

== K ==
Country	Criminalised	Notes
Kazakhstan	Yes	The law criminalises rape. The punishment for rape, including spousal rape, ranges from 3 to 15 years' imprisonment. Spousal rape is not explicitly included in the definition of rape. (Criminal Code, Art. 120) (Note: Kazakhstan: Criminal Code (amended to 2018) (in Russian)) There were reports of police and judicial reluctance to act on reports of rape, particularly in spousal rape cases.
Kenya	Explicitly criminalised	Marital rape is excluded from the definition of rape in the Sexual Offences Act (2006), section 43(5). (Note: Kenya: Sexual Offences Act (2006)) However it is included in Section 3(a)(vi) of the Protection Against Domestic Violence Act (2015): "‘In this Act, 'violence' means abuse that includes sexual violence within marriage". (Note: Kenya: Protection Against Domestic Violence Act (2015))
Kiribati	Yes	Rape, including spousal rape, is a crime, with a maximum penalty of life in prison, but sentences typically were much shorter. Spousal rape is not explicitly included in the definition of rape. (Penal Code, Sec. 128) (Note: Kiribati: Penal Code (1977))
Kosovo	Yes	The Kosovo Criminal Code does not explicitly include marital rape in the definition of rape. (Art. 230) (Note: Kosovo: Criminal Code (1982))
Kuwait	Yes/No	Rape carries a maximum penalty of death, which the courts occasionally imposed for the crime though spousal rape is not covered under this law. However, in August 2020, Kuwait passed a domestic violence law criminalizing "physical, psychological, sexual or financial mistreatment, whether in words or actions" amongst family members including spousal mistreatment. The law does not address marital rape specifically and came into effect in January 2021.
Kyrgyzstan	Yes	Rape, including spousal rape, is illegal, but the government failed to enforce the law effectively. Police generally regarded spousal rape as an administrative, rather than a criminal, offense. The Penal Code does not explicitly include marital rape in the definition of rape. (Art. 129) (Note: Kyrgyzstan: Penal Code (1997, amended to 2018) (in Russian))

== L ==
Country	Criminalised	Notes
Laos	Explicitly criminalised	Marital rape was explicitly criminalised in December 2014 by art. 79 of The Law on Preventing and Combating Violence Against Women and Children. (Note: Laos: Law on Preventing and Combating Violence Against Women and Children (2014)) Domestic violence often went unreported due to social stigma.
Latvia	Explicitly criminalised	Spousal rape is explicitly considered rape with "aggravated circumstances". (Criminal Law, Secs. 48(1)(15) and 159) (Note: Latvia: Criminal Law (1998, amended to 2013))
Lebanon	Yes/No	Article 503 of the Penal Code defines rape as "forced sexual intercourse [against someone] who is not his wife by violence or threat." (Note: Lebanon: Penal Code (in Arabic)) Law no. 293 (2014) gives a legal "marital right of intercourse". However, in May 2014 the Protection of Women and Other Family Members from Domestic Violence Law added new offences of the use of threats or violence to claim the "marital right to intercourse". Critics of the law point out that the threats or violence are the criminal offences but not the rape.
Lesotho	Explicitly criminalised	The law criminalises the rape of women or men, including spousal rape (Penal Code Act, 2010, Sec. 52(2)(h)(ii)), (Note: Lesotho: Penal Code Act (2010, amended to 2012)) and domestic violence. Rape convictions carry a minimum sentence of 10 years' imprisonment.
Liberia	Yes	Rape is illegal, but the government did not enforce the law effectively, and rape remained a serious and pervasive problem. The law's definition of rape does not specifically criminalise spousal rape, but "marital exemption" was removed from the law in 2006 by the Rape Amendment Act. (Note: Liberia: Rape Amendment Act (2006))
Libya	No	The law criminalises rape but does not address spousal rape. Spousal rape is not considered a crime but a private matter.
Liechtenstein	Explicitly criminalised	Rape, including spousal rape, is a criminal offense. Penalties for rape and sexual violence vary between one and 15 years' imprisonment, depending on the degree of violence and humiliation of the victim, and between 10 years' and lifetime imprisonment if the victim is killed. Marital rape was criminalised in 2001, by the Law on Sexual Offenses.
Lithuania	Yes	Rape and domestic violence are criminal offenses, and although no law specifically criminalises spousal rape, a wife can file a complaint against her husband for rape or sexual assault under Article 149 of the Criminal Code. (Note: Lithuania: Criminal Code (1968, amended to 2018) (in Lithuanian))
Luxembourg	Explicitly criminalised	The law prohibits rape, including spousal rape, and the government enforced the law effectively. Penalties for violations range from five to ten years' imprisonment. In 1994, in Judgment no. 223/94 V, 1994, the Court of Appeal confirmed the applicability of the provisions of the Criminal Code regarding rape to marital rape. Since 2013, the maximum penalty for rape can be doubled if carried out by a spouse (Code Pénal, Art. 377(5)). (Note: Luxembourg: Code Pénal (1879, amended to 2016) (in French))

== M ==
Country	Criminalised	Notes
Macau	Yes	
Macedonia	Yes	The penalties for rape, including spousal rape, range from 1 to 15 years' imprisonment. Marital rape was criminalised in 1996, although not explicitly (Criminal Code, Art. 186). (Note: Macedonia: Criminal Code (1996))
Madagascar	Customary law	The law prohibits rape but does not address spousal rape. A bill to prohibit spousal rape was defeated in the Parliament of Madagascar in 2014. Customary law holds that sex within marriage is consensual.
Malawi	Case law	Although the definition of rape in the Penal Code (s.132) does not include a "marital exemption", (Note: Malawi: Penal Code) the presumption of a wife's consent under Customary Law was upheld by the High Court of Malawi in R.vs. Mwasomola, 4 ALR(Mal) 572. The Marriage, Divorce, and Family Relations Act enacted in 2015 explicitly introduces the concept of spousal rape, but the act does not prescribe specific penalties and applies only to legally separated spouses. (Note: Malawi: Marriage, Divorce and Family Relations Act (2015))
Malaysia	Yes/No	The concept of rape within marriage is not recognised. However, if a man "causes hurt or fear of death or hurt to his wife or any other person in order to have sexual intercourse with his wife ", he may be imprisoned up to five years if convicted according to Section 375A of the Penal Code (adopted on 7 September 2007). (Note: Malaysia: Penal Code (1936, amended to 2015))
Maldives	Explicitly excluded	The Sexual Offences Act (Act 17/2014) excludes marital rape, except in very narrow circumstances such as the couple are legally separated or one has a STI.
Mali	Yes	The Code Pénal, Art. 226, does not specifically prohibit spousal rape, (Note: Mali: Code Pénal (1979, amended to 2002) (in French)) but law enforcement officials stated criminal laws against rape apply to spousal rape.
Malta	Explicitly criminalised	The 2005 Law To Make Special Provisions For Domestic Violence (Note: Malta: Law To Make Special Provisions For Domestic Violence (2005)) added article 202(h) to the Criminal Code. This article made rape by a spouse an aggravating factor. (Note: Malta: Criminal Code (1854, amended to 2018)) In 2018 ACT No. XIII further changed art. 202(h), changing "spouse" to "he current or former spouse, civil union partner or cohabitant". (Note: Malta: ACT No. XIII (2018))
Marshall Islands	Yes	The law criminalises rape, including spousal rape, although not explicitly (Criminal Code s. 213.1(1)(a) & 213.2(1)(a)), (Note: Marshall Islands: Criminal Code (2011, amended to 2014)) and establishes penalties of up to 25 years' imprisonment for first-degree sexual assault.
Mauritania	Yes	Rape, including spousal rape, is illegal. Rapists who are single men face penalties of forced labor and whipping, and married rapists are subject to the death penalty. The Law does not differentiate between rape within marriage and rape outside marriage. (Code Pénal, art. 309) (Note: Mauritania: Code Pénal)
Mauritius	Explicitly criminalised	Amendments to the Protection from Domestic Violence Act (PDVA) came into force in September 2016. The amendments redefine the term "spouse" to include unmarried couples of the opposite sex; redefine "domestic violence" to include verbal, psychological, economic, and sexual abuses. Although the amendments do not mention spousal rape, section 2.d. stipulates that a spouse cannot force or threaten the other partner into a sexual act "from which the spouse or the other person has the right to abstain." (Note: Mauritius: Protection from Domestic Violence (Amendment) Act (2016)) Spousal rape was first criminalised in 2007.
Mexico	Explicitly criminalised	Federal law criminalises rape of men or women and conviction carries penalties of up to 20 years' imprisonment. Twenty-four states have laws criminalising spousal rape. Article 265 bis of the Código Penal Federal explicitly criminalises rape of a "wife or concubine". (Note: Mexico: Código Penal Federal (1931, amended to 2018) (in Spanish))
Micronesia	Yes/No	Marital rape is explicitly excluded from the definition of rape in Pohnpei State (Pohnpei Code, Title 61, Ch. 5, §5-141(2)), but not in the states of Kosrae, Yap and Chuuk.
Moldova	Explicitly criminalised	The law criminalises rape or forcible sexual assault and establishes penalties for violations ranging from three years to life in prison. Since 2010, the law has also explicitly criminalised spousal rape (Criminal Code, arts.133(1) & 171 (2)(b2)) (Note: Moldova: Criminal Code (2002, amended to 2018) (in Romanian))
Monaco	Explicitly criminalised	Rape, including spousal rape, is a criminal offense with penalties of 5, 10, and up to 20 years in prison, depending on the type of offense. Spousal rape was explicitly criminalised Law No. 1.382 of 2011.
Mongolia	Explicitly criminalised	The criminal code outlaws sexual intercourse through physical violence, or threat of violence, and provides for sentences of 1 to 20 years' imprisonment or life imprisonment, depending on the circumstances. Marital rape was criminalised by the Law to Combat Domestic Violence (art. 6.1.4).
Montenegro	Yes	In most cases the penalty provided by law for rape, including spousal rape, is one to ten years in prison. In practice, the average conviction resulted in three years. Spousal rape is not explicitly included in the definition of rape (Criminal Code, art. 204). (Note: Montenegro: Criminal Code (2003, amended to 2017) (in Bosnian))
Morocco	Yes/No	Spousal rape is not outlawed in the penal code. Forced marriage and harassment was outlawed in 2018. However, there is jurisprudence criminalizing marital rape, with a man having been found guilty of marital rape by the Tangier Court of First Instance in 2020. In May 2022, a Rabat Family Court ruled against a man who had sued his wife for refusing sex, ruling that "sexual intercourse may not be carried forcibly [...] as it contradicts the religious purpose of intercourse".
Mozambique	Explicitly criminalised	The law criminalises rape, including spousal rape, and domestic violence. Penalties for conviction range from two to eight years' imprisonment if the victim is 12 years of age or older and 20 to 24 years' imprisonment if the victim is under 12. Marital rape is explicitly criminalised by Law N.29/2009 on Domestic Violence Perpetrated Against Women, (arts. 3 & 17) (Note: Mozambique: Law N.29/2009 on Domestic Violence Perpetrated Against Women (2009) (in Portuguese)) and the Criminal Code Law N.35/2014, (arts. 37(aa) & 218). (Note: Mozambique: Criminal Code Law (2014) (in Portuguese))
Myanmar	Explicitly excluded	Spousal rape is not a crime unless the wife is younger than 13 years, and is explicitly excluded from the definition of rape in section 375 of the Penal Code. (Note: Myanmar: Penal Code)

== N ==
Country	Criminalised	Notes
Namibia	Explicitly criminalised	The law criminalises rape of men and women, including spousal rape. By law rape is defined as the commitment of any sexual act under coercive circumstances. The courts tried numerous cases of rape during the year, and the government generally enforced court sentences providing between five and 45 years' imprisonment for those convicted. Marital rape was outlawed in 2000, by section 2(3) of the Combating of Rape Act. (Note: Namibia: Combating of Rape Act (2000))
Nauru	Explicitly criminalised	Rape is a crime and carries a maximum penalty of 25 years' imprisonment. Section 104 of the 2016 Crimes Act (Note: Nauru: Crimes Act (2016)) specifically applies penalties for rape of married and de facto partners.
Nepal	Explicitly criminalised	Section 219 (4) of the 2017 Criminal Code Bill states, "If a man rapes his wife when he is still in marital relationship with her, he shall be sentenced to up to five years in jail.". Marital rape was also criminalised under the previous Criminal Code (2006).
Netherlands	Yes	The law in all parts of the kingdom criminalises rape, including spousal rape, and domestic violence. The penalty is imprisonment not exceeding 12 years, a fine not exceeding 78 thousand euros ($93,600), or both. In case of violence against a spouse, the penalty for various forms of abuse can be increased by one-third. Legislative changes provided a new definition for rape in 1991, which removed the marital exemption, and also made the crime gender-neutral.
New Zealand	Explicitly criminalised	The law criminalises rape, including spousal rape (Crimes Act 1961, sec. 128(4)). (Note: New Zealand: Crimes Act (1961, amended to 2017)) The maximum penalty is 20 years' imprisonment. Marital rape was first criminalised in 1985.
Nicaragua	Explicitly criminalised	The law criminalises all forms of rape of men or women, regardless of the relationship between the victim and the accused. Sentences for those convicted of rape range from 8 to 12 years' imprisonment. Marital rape was criminalised in 2012 by Ley No. 779 (Note: Nicaragua: Ley No. 779 (2012) (in Spanish)) which modified arts. 37 & 169 of the Código Penal. (Note: Nicaragua: Código Penal (in Spanish))
Niger	Yes	The law does not explicitly recognize spousal rape, (Note: Niger Code Pénal (2003, amended to 2008) (in French)) and authorities seldom prosecuted it. Victims often sought to deal with the rape within the family or were pressured to do so, and many victims did not report spousal rape due to fear of retribution, including loss of economic support.
Nigeria	Explicitly excluded	Marital rape is explicitly excluded from the definition of rape in the Northern Nigeria Penal Code provided the spouse has reached puberty (Section 282(2)), and likewise excluded from Section 357 of the Nigerian Criminal Code (applying to the southern states).
North Korea	No	As of 2017 it was legal.
Norway	Yes	The law criminalises rape, including spousal rape, (Note: Norway: Criminal Code (in Nynorsk)) and the government generally enforced the law. The penalty for rape is up to 21 years in prison, depending on the severity of the assault, the age of the victim, and the circumstances in which the crime occurred. Unlike Sweden and Denmark, Norway never had an exemption for marital rape, and a 1974 Supreme Court verdict confirmed that rape in marriage was a criminal act.

== O ==
Country	Criminalised	Notes
Oman	Explicitly excluded	The law criminalises rape with penalties of up to 15 years in prison but does not criminalise spousal rape. Article 218(1) of the Penal Code of Oman explicitly excludes marital rape from the definition of rape. (Note: Oman: Penal Code (in Arabic))

== P ==
Country	Criminalised	Notes
Pakistan	Yes	Marital rape was explicitly excluded in the Indian Penal Code, 1860 under section 375. The Offence of Zina (Enforcement of Hudood) Ordinance, 1979 continued to reflect this and included in its definition of rape "to whom he or she is not validly married". This ordinance was repealed by the Protection of Women (Criminal Laws Amendment) Act, 2006 and rape under Section 375 of the Pakistan Penal Code, 1860 was reinstituted. (Note: Pakistan: Penal Code) The new definition did not include a reference to marriage. It was argued that the intent was to include marital rape in the offence. As of February 2015, there were no reports of a case being brought before a superior court to clarify the law. In 2021 an amendment was made to Section 375 which expanded the applicability of the crime through the inclusion of a definition on "consent" which thus far had not been defined, which would indirectly also include marital rape.
Palau	Yes	Rape, including spousal rape, is a crime punishable by a maximum 25 years' imprisonment, a fine of $50,000 (national currency is U.S. dollar), or both. The 2012 Palau Family Protection Act removed the "marital exemption" from Palau National Code. (Note: Palau: Family Protection Act (2012))
Palestine	Explicitly excluded	Article 292(1) of the Criminal Code of 1960 explicitly excludes marital rape from the law on rape. (Note: Palestine: Penal Code (1960) (in Arabic))
Panama	Explicitly criminalised	The law criminalises rape of men or women, including spousal rape, with prison terms of five to ten years. In 2013, Ley No. 82 (Note: Panama: Ley No. 82 (2013) (in Spanish)) amended the Código Penal to explicitly criminalise marital rape (arts. 91 & 174). (Note: Panama: Código Penal (in Spanish))
Papua New Guinea	Yes	Rape, including spousal rape, is a crime punishable by imprisonment ranging from 15 years to life. The legal system allows village chiefs to negotiate the payment of compensation in lieu of trials for rapists. In 2002, The Criminal Code (Sexual Offences and Crimes against Children) Act removed the rape "marital exemption" from the Criminal Code (sec 347). (Note: Papua New Guinea: Criminal Code Act (1974, amended to 2002))
Paraguay	Yes	The law criminalises rape of men or women, including spousal rape, and provides penalties of up to 10 years in prison for rape or sexual assault. Marital rape is not explicitly criminalised by the Código Penal (art. 128). (Note: Paraguay: Código Penal (1997, amended to 2008) (in Spanish))
Peru	Explicitly criminalised	The law criminalises rape of men or women, including spousal rape, with penalties of six to eight years in prison. Marital rape has been explicitly criminalised since 2007 by art. 170 of the Código Penal. (Note: Peru: Código Penal (1997, amended to 2007) (in Spanish))
Philippines	Explicitly criminalised	See also: Rape in the Philippines § Marital rape Rape, including spousal rape, is illegal, with penalties ranging from 12 to 40 years' imprisonment. An anti-rape law covering marital rape was passed in 1997. (Note: Philippines: Anti-rape law (1997)) Marital rape was explicitly criminalised by the Anti- Violence Against Women and Their Children Act of 2004 (Sec. 3(B)(a),(b)). (Note: Philippines: Anti- Violence Against Women and Their Children Act (2004)) The legality of the marital rape laws was upheld by the Supreme Court in People vs Jumawan G.R. No. 187495 (2014).
Poland	Yes	Rape, including spousal rape, is illegal and punishable by up to 12 years in prison. The "marital exemption" clause was dropped when the 1932 Criminal Code was introduced. The Penal Code does not explicitly criminalise marital rape (art. 197). (Note: Poland: Penal Code (in Polish))
Portugal	Explicitly criminalised	The law makes rape, including spousal rape, illegal, with a penalty of three to ten years' imprisonment. The "marital exemption" was removed from the law in 1982. In 2007, amendments (Note: Portugal: 23 Amendment to the Penal Code (2207) (in Portuguese)) to the Penal Code arts. 152 & 164), explicitly criminalised marital rape. (Note: Portugal: Penal Code (1982, amended to 2018) (in Portuguese))

== Q ==
Country	Criminalised	Notes
Qatar	Yes	Article 279 of the Penal Code criminalises rape. (Note: Qatar: Penal Code (2004) (in Arabic)) Spousal rape is not explicitly criminalised, but a woman may file a complaint. The penalty for rape is life imprisonment, regardless of the age or sex of the victim.

== R ==
Country	Criminalised	Notes
Romania	Explicitly criminalised	Rape, including spousal rape, is illegal. The law provides for three to ten years' imprisonment for rape and two to seven years' imprisonment for sexual assault. In 2003, marital rape was criminalised by article 4(d) of the Law on Preventing and Fighting Against Domestic Violence. (Note: Romania: Law on Preventing and Fighting Against Domestic Violence (2003) (in Romanian))
Russia	Yes	Rape is illegal, and the law provides the same punishment for a relative, including the spouse, who commits rape as for a nonrelative. (Note: Russia: Russia (1996, amended to 2018) (in Russian)) The Soviet Union, in which Russia was the dominant republic, removed "marital exemption" from its rape laws in 1922.
Rwanda	Explicitly criminalised	The law criminalises rape of men and women and spousal rape, and the government handled rape cases as a judicial priority. Penalties for conviction of spousal rape range from two months' to life imprisonment with fines of 100,000 to 300,000 Rwandan francs. Spousal rape was first criminalised in 2009, when the Law on prevention and punishment of gender- based violence came into effect. (Note: Rwanda: Law on prevention and punishment of gender- based violence (2008))

== S ==
Country	Criminalised	Notes
Saint Kitts and Nevis	Yes	Marital rape is neither explicitly included or excluded from article 46 of the Offences against the Person Act which criminalises rape. (Note: Saint Kitts and Nevis: Offences against the Person Act (1873, amended to 2002))
Saint Lucia	Explicitly excluded	Section 123(3) of the Criminal Code (Note: Saint Lucia: Criminal Code (2005)) explicitly excludes marital rape except when a couple is divorced or separated or when there is a protection order from the Family Court.
Saint Vincent and the Grenadines	Yes	Rape, including spousal rape (although not explicitly), is illegal, and the government generally enforced the law when victims came forward. Sentences for rape begin at 10 years' imprisonment.
Samoa	Explicitly criminalised	The 2013 Crimes Act removed the "marital exemption" from the Crimes Ordinance 1961, and section 49(4) explicitly criminalised marital rape. (Note: Samoa: Crimes Act (2013))
San Marino	Explicitly criminalised	Rape, including spousal rape, is a criminal offense, and the government effectively prosecuted persons accused of such crimes. The penalty for rape is two to six years in prison. Article 10 of the 2008 Prevention and Repression of Violence against Women and Gender-Based Violence Law made rape by a spouse an aggravating factor. (Note: San Marino: Prevention and Repression of Violence against Women and Gender-Based Violence (2008) (in Italian))
Sao Tome and Principe	Explicitly criminalised	Rape, including spousal rape, is illegal and punishable by 2 to 12 years' imprisonment. Marital rape was explicitly criminalised by Law No. 11/2008, Art. 15
Saudi Arabia	No	Rape is a criminal offense under sharia with a wide range of penalties from flogging to execution. The law does not recognize spousal rape as a crime.
Senegal	Yes	The law prohibits rape, which is punishable by five to ten years' imprisonment. Nevertheless, the government rarely enforced the law, and rape was widespread. The law does not address spousal rape, but does not exclude it from the definition of rape in article 320 of the Criminal Code. (Note: Senegal: Penal Code (1965, amended) (in French))
Serbia	Explicitly criminalised	Rape, including spousal rape, is punishable by up to 40 years in prison. The government did not enforce the law effectively. The "marital exemption" was dropped in 2002, and marital rape explicitly criminalised by the 2016 Law on the Prevention of Domestic Violence (arts. 3 & 4(2)). (Note: Serbia: Law on the Prevention of Domestic Violence (2016) (in Serbian))
Seychelles	Yes	Rape is a criminal offense under Sec. 130 of the Penal Code, for which conviction is punishable by a maximum of 20 years' imprisonment. Marital rape is not explicitly criminalised. (Note: Seychelles: Penal Code (1955, amended to 2012)) Nevertheless, rape was a problem, and the government did not enforce the law effectively.
Sierra Leone	Explicitly criminalised	The law has specifically prohibited spousal rape since 2012 by Secs. 5 and 6 of the Sexual Offences Act. (Note: Sierra Leone: Sexual Offences Act (2012))
Singapore	Explicitly criminalised (Note: Singapore: Penal Code (1871, amended to 2020))	Prior to 2020, spousal rape was explicitly excluded from rape laws except in very narrow circumstances (Sec. 375 of the Penal Code), but husbands who force their wives to have intercourse may be prosecuted for other offenses, such as assault. Spousal rape is a criminal offense when the couple is separated, subject to an interim divorce order that has not become final, or subject to a written separation agreement, as well as when a court has issued a protection order against the husband. This exemption was lifted on 1 January 2020, with all kinds of spousal rape criminalised.
Slovakia	Explicitly criminalised	The explicit exclusion of marital rape was removed from Czechoslovak penal code in 1950. Since then it is punishable as other cases of rape. The current Slovak criminal code explicitly includes spousal rape under the crime of rape and sexual violence in Sections 199 (if also Sections 127(5) and 139 (1c) are applied) and provides a penalty of 7 to 15 years in prison. (Note: Slovakia: Criminal Code (2005, amended to 2018) (in Slovak))
Slovenia	Explicitly criminalised	Marital rape is explicitly criminalised by article 170 of the Criminal Code. (Note: Slovenia: Criminal Code (in Slovene)) As a republic with Yugoslavia, marital rape was first criminalised by Slovenia in 1977.
Solomon Islands	Explicitly criminalised	Marital rape is explicitly criminalised by section 5(136F)(2)of the Penal Code (Amendment) (Sexual Offences) Act 2016. (Note: Solomon Islands: Penal Code (Amendment) (Sexual Offences) Act (2016)) Rape carries a maximum penalty of life imprisonment.
Somalia	Yes/No	There are no federal laws against spousal violence, including rape, although in May 2016, the Council of Ministers approved a national gender policy that gives the government the right to sue anyone convicted of committing gender-based violence, such as the killing or rape of a woman.
South Africa	Explicitly criminalised	Spousal rape was criminalised in 1993 by article 5 of the Prevention of Family Violence Act, (Note: South Africa: Prevention of Family Violence Act (1993)) although the first prosecution was not until 2012.
South Korea	Court decision	Although no specific statute defines spousal rape as illegal, the South Korean Supreme Court acknowledged marital rape as illegal in 2013. The penalty for rape ranges from a minimum of three years to life imprisonment depending on the specific circumstances.
South Sudan	Explicitly excluded	Article 247(3) of the 2008 Penal Code is explicit that marital rape is not an offence. (Note: South Sudan: Penal Code Act (2008))
Spain	Court decision	The law prohibits rape, including spousal rape, and the government generally enforced the law effectively. The penalty for rape is 6 to 12 years in prison. The Supreme Court ruled in 1992 that sex within marriage must be consensual.
Sri Lanka	Explicitly excluded	Marital rape is excluded from the definition of rape in article 363 of the Penal Code (Note: Sri Lanka: Penal Code (1885, as amended)) except if the spouses are legally separated.
Sudan	Yes	In February 2015, an amendment to Article 149 of the Criminal Code changed the definition of rape. Under the new definition of rape, rape victims could no longer be prosecuted for adultery. Although there is no specific prohibition of marital rape, the amendment makes it possible to prosecute marital rape.
Suriname	Explicitly criminalised	The law criminalises rape of women, including spousal rape, and prescribes penalties for rape or forcible sexual assault of between 12 and 15 years' imprisonment, and fines up to 100,000 Surinamese dollars. Spousal rape was criminalised in 2009 by an amendment to the Moral Law. (Note: Suriname: Moral Law Amendment (2009) (in Dutch))
Sweden	Explicitly criminalised	Rape, including spousal rape and domestic violence (Ch. 4, Sec. 4a of the Penal Code), (Note: Sweden: Penal Code (1962, amended to 2018) (in Swedish)) are illegal, and the government enforced the law effectively. Penalties range from two to ten years in prison. Marital rape was first criminalised in 1965.
Switzerland	Yes	Rape, including spousal rape (although not explicitly so), and domestic violence, are statutory offenses for which penalties range from one to ten years in prison (Swiss Criminal Code, art 190). (Note: Switzerland: Criminal Code (1937, amended to 2018)) The government effectively prosecuted individuals accused of such crimes. The "marital exemption" was removed from law in 1992.
Syria	Explicitly excluded	Rape is a felony, subject to punishment by at least 15 years in prison, but the government did not enforce the law. The law further stipulates that if the rapist marries the victim, the rapist receives no punishment. The victim's family sometimes agreed to this arrangement to avoid the social stigma attached to rape. Marital rape is explicitly excluded from the rape laws by art 489(1) of the Criminal Code. (Note: Syria: Penal Code (in Arabic))

== T ==
Country	Criminalised	Notes
Taiwan	Explicitly criminalised	The law criminalises rape, including spousal rape, and domestic violence. (Criminal Code of the Republic of China, Arts.221 and 229–1) (Note: Taiwan: Criminal Code of the Republic of China (in Chinese))
Tajikistan	No	Marital rape is not recognised as a criminal offence.
Tanzania	Explicitly excluded	Section 5 of the 1998 Sexual Offences (Special Provisions) Act explicitly excludes marital rape (Note: Tanzania: Sexual Offences (Special Provisions) Act (1998)) on the grounds "husbands, by virtue of paying bride price, have legal right to have unlimited sexual access to their wives".
Thailand	Explicitly criminalised	Rape is illegal, although the government did not always enforce the law effectively. The law permits authorities to prosecute spousal rape, and prosecutions occurred. The law specifies penalties for conviction of rape or forcible sexual assault ranging from four years' imprisonment to the death penalty as well as fines. Marital rape was criminalised in 2007 amid strong controversy, by Sec. 3(276) of the Penal Code Amendment Act (No. 19). (Note: Thailand: Penal Code Amendment Act (No. 19) (2007))
Togo	Explicitly criminalised	Marital rape is explicitly criminalised by Arts. 211-212 of Loi No. 2015-010 Portant Nouveau Code Pénal (Note: Togo: Loi No. 2015-010 Portant Nouveau Code Pénal (2015) (in French)) and is punishable by up to 720 hours of community service and a fine of 200,000 to 1,000,000 CFA francs.
Tonga	Yes	The law recognizes spousal rape. (Criminal Offences Act, Sec. 118(2) (Note: Tonga: Criminal Offences Act (2016)) & Family Protection Act, Sec. 29) (Note: Tonga: Family Protection Act (2013))
Trinidad and Tobago	Explicitly criminalised	Marital rape was explicitly criminalised by section 4(4)(5) of the Sexual Offences (Amendment) Act, 2000. (Note: Trinidad and Tobago: Sexual Offences (Amendment) Act (2000)) Rape is punishable by up to life imprisonment, but the courts often imposed considerably shorter sentences.
Tunisia	Explicitly criminalised	Prior to June 2017, marital rape was not considered a crime. Although Article 227 of the Penal Code does not exclude marital rape from its provisions, Article 23 of the Personal Status Code mandated partners in marriage to "fulfil their conjugal duties according to practice and customs," On 27 June 2017, the Tunisian Parliament unanimously passed a comprehensive law addressing all forms of gender-based violence, including physical, economic, and social violence. The provisions of this law include marital rape.
Turkey	Explicitly criminalised	The law prohibits sexual assault, including rape and spousal rape (Art. 102, Criminal Code), (Note: Turkey: Criminal Code (amended to 2016)) with penalties of two to ten years' imprisonment for conviction of attempted sexual violation and at least 12 years' imprisonment for conviction of rape or sexual violation. Marital rape was criminalised in 2005.
Turkmenistan	Yes	Marital rape is illegal and punishable by sentences ranging from 3 to 25 years imprisonment.
Tuvalu	No	Rape is a crime punishable by a minimum sentence of five years' imprisonment, but spousal rape is not included in the legal definition of this offense.

== U ==
Country	Criminalised	Notes
Uganda	Customary law	Rape is defined as "unlawful carnal knowledge of a woman or a girl without her consent" in Section 123 of the Penal Code, there is no marital exemption. However, in customary law, there is a presupposition that a woman implicitly consents to sexual intercourse with her spouse during marriage. As of late 2018, the Sexual Offences Bill, which would explicitly criminalise marital rape, is before the Parliament of Uganda. Similar bills were defeated in 1970, 2003 and 2009.
Ukraine	Yes	The law prohibits rape of men or women but does not explicitly address spousal rape or domestic violence. The courts may use a law against "forced sex with a materially dependent person" as grounds to prosecute spousal rape.
United Arab Emirates	No	The penal code does not address spousal rape. In October 2017, the Dubai Court of First Instance sentenced a policeman to six months in jail for raping his fiancée. The defendant argued that he considered the two married at the time of the offense.
United Kingdom	Explicitly criminalised	The law criminalises rape, spousal rape, and domestic violence. The maximum legal penalty for rape is life imprisonment. The law also provides for injunctive relief, personal protection orders, and protective exclusion orders (similar to restraining orders) for female victims of violence. In Scotland in 1989, The High Court of Justiciary held in the case of Stallard v HM Advocate that a husband is "not immune from prosecution for raping his wife", rejecting the premise that she has "surrendered her person to him" and concluding that "consent to the acts" was the only question to be answered. In the United Kingdom, the notion of a common law marital exemption was rejected by the House of Lords in the case of R v R in 1991, the judgement affirming that "in modern times the supposed marital exemption in rape forms no part of the law of England." Rape was made a statutory offence by the Criminal Justice and Public Order Act 1994 without the marital defence. The Sexual Offences Act 2003 (replacing the 1994 definition) now provides that relationship status is not a defence against a charge brought under the Act.
United States	Yes	Main article: Marital rape in the United States Marital rape has been illegal in all 50 US states since 1993. In 1975 it was made illegal in Nebraska, while North Carolina and Oklahoma were the last states to prosecute it. Legislation varies from state to state and there are still states, like South Carolina, where marital and non-marital rape are treated quite differently under the law.
Uruguay	Yes	The law criminalises rape of men or women, including spousal rape, although not explicitly (Código Penal, Art. 272). (Note: Uruguay: Código Penal (amended to 2014) (in Spanish)) The law allows for sentences of 2 to 12 years' imprisonment for a person found guilty of rape, and authorities effectively enforced the law.
Uzbekistan	Explicitly criminalised	Marital rape is explicitly criminalised by Art. 118 and Chapter Eight* of the Criminal Code, (Note: Uzbekistan: Uzbekistan (1994, amended to 2012)) however the courts did not try any rape cases as of 2017, according to human rights activists.

== V ==
Country	Criminalised	Notes
Vanuatu	Yes	The Penal Code, Sec. 90, (Note: Vanuatu: Penal Code (1981, amended to 2006)) defines rape but does not explicitly include marital rape. Police are frequently reluctant to intervene in what they considered domestic matters.
Venezuela	Explicitly criminalised	Articles 15(7) & 43 of the Ley Orgánica Sobre el Derecho de las Mujeres a una Vida Libre de Violencia (Organic Law on the Right of Women to a Life Free of Violence) explicitly criminalised marital rape in 2007. (Note: Venezuela: Ley Orgánica Sobre el Derecho de las Mujeres a una Vida Libre de Violencia (2007) (in Spanish))
Vietnam	Explicitly criminalised	In 2002, marital rape was explicitly criminalised by article 2(1)(e) of the Law on Domestic Violence Prevention and Control. (Note: Vietnam: Law on Domestic Violence Prevention and Control (2005))

== Y ==
Country	Criminalised	Notes
Yemen	Explicitly excluded	The law criminalises rape, but it does not criminalise spousal rape because the law states a woman may not refuse sexual relations with her husband.

== Z ==
Country	Criminalised	Notes
Zambia	Explicitly criminalised	The 2010 Anti-Gender-based Violence Act criminalises spousal rape. (Note: Zambia: Anti-Gender-based Violence Act (2011))
Zimbabwe	Explicitly criminalised	Marital rape was criminalised in 2004 by section 68 of the "Criminal Law (Codification And Reform) Act". However Article 68 (a) states "no prosecution shall be instituted against any husband for raping or indecently assaulting his wife ... unless the Attorney-General has authorised such a prosecution". (Note: Zimbabwe: Criminal Law (Codification And Reform) Act (2004)) Spousal rape receives less attention than physical violence against women.
