= James Stewart (solicitor) =

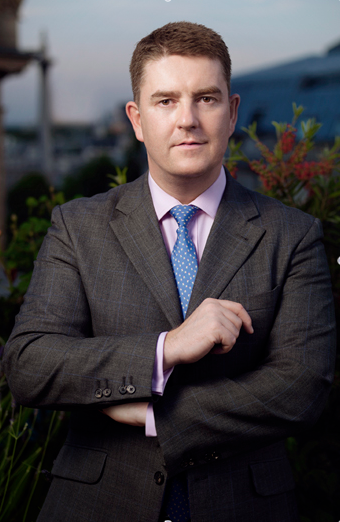
- Born: James Henry Wilson Stewart; Liskey, Strabane, Northern Ireland
- Education: Coleraine Academical Institution; University of Essex
- Occupation: Divorce lawyer
- Employer: Penningtons Manches LLP
- Parent(s): John Desmond Moody Stewart, Elizabeth Frances Wilson

James Stewart is a London-based family lawyer.

The son of a County Tyrone farmer, Stewart was educated at Coleraine Academical Institution in County Londonderry, and the University of Essex. He attended the College of Law, Chester.

== Legal career ==
Stewart qualified as a solicitor in 1990, was accredited by Resolution as a specialist family lawyer in 1999. A year later he was appointed partner and head of the family department at Reynolds Porter Chamberlain. In 2003 he was profiled in the "On the Verge" series of the Observer magazine . He became a partner at Manches, now Penningtons Manches LLP, in 2006, shortly after being elected as a Fellow of the International Academy of Family Lawyers (IAFL).

He is ranked as a leading individual in the 2015 edition of Legal 500, Spears WMS Legal Index and in Chambers UK 2011.

In January 2009 Stewart was appointed Governor of the IAFL and invited to become a member of the Times Law Panel, an advisory body of 100 of the country's most prominent barristers and solicitors. In January 2011 Stewart was named in the Lawyer Magazines 'Hot 100' listing.

== Notable cases ==
Stewart has acted on a number celebrity and high-profile divorces. His clients have included Priscilla Waters (in her divorce against Roger Waters) and Julie Le Brocquy, producer of BAFTA award-winning Osama. Stewart also successfully represented Glory Annen Clibbery in the landmark family/Human Rights Act 1998 case of Clibbery v Allan (2002), where he won at first instance and on appeal. He also acted for the successful claimant, Kerry Cox, in the widely publicised cohabitation case of Cox v Jones in 2004. His firm, Penningtons Manches, represented Guy Ritchie in his divorce with his wife Madonna.

== Publications ==
In 2015 Stewart's book, Family Law: Jurisdiction Comparisons, was published by Sweet and Maxwell.

== Personal life ==
Stewart lives in Covent Garden, London.

== See also ==
- Collaborative Family Law
