= Marital debt =

Spouse's sexual commitment to one another

Marital duty (commonly referred as conjugal duty) is a spouse's sexual commitment to one another. The concept stems from descriptions found in canon law of medieval Europe.

== History ==
During the later medieval period (10th to 15th centuries), a new scholastic way of thinking allowed the Church to solidify doctrine, leading to the formation of ecclesiastical law. This new wave of thinking stemmed from the revival and codification of some Roman laws. Particular works from Irnerius and his students in 1112 and 1125 in particular, reconstructed some laws of Justinian's Code. Work on laws allowed scholars to debate the issues like marriage as a sacrament. Biblical references to marriage, like that found in 1 Corinthians 7 alludes to it as a preventative measure for "sexual immorality." Scholars like Gratian of Bologna were quick to posit their theories on marriage. His 12th century work, Decretum Gratiani, became an early text example for other canon law studies and it is here where the earliest account for marital debt is found. In it, he writes that marriage arose from wishing to prevent further sin through fornication. Gratian is also quick to point out four main reasons people may have for getting married: that is for offspring, to pay the debt, or the obligation of sex, for incontinence, or to satisfy lust and for the sake of pleasure.

A pattern of reciprocal sexual obligation then emerged. Spousal consent, from interpretations on marital debt, allowed spouses to more easily influence the lives of their other spouse. They lived in communal bond, a sexual bond known as a "conjugal domicile". One notable example of the strength of this bond, was when a husband wished to leave his marriage for a monastic life but he remains in a sexual debt to his wife. He, therefore, could only leave for the monastery if his wife consents to his departure.

== Impact ==
Ecclesiastical courts were increasingly becoming a venue for couples to resolve marital disputes in the 11th and 12th centuries. It thus became important for the church to further consolidate and solidify canon law, so the courts could resolve the numerous cases. These increasingly strict canon laws made it much more difficult to get divorced or have a marriage annulled. One way to get a marriage annulment was if one spouse was impotent, in other words, if they could not fulfill the marital debt. In these cases, the healthy spouse could remarry while the impotent one could not. There was some disagreement amongst the clergy about cases where a person was capable of fulfilling the conjugal debt, but was sterile and could not procreate. In these cases, some thought that you needed to be able to procreate to maintain the marriage.

Conjugal duty also had implications in terms of gender equality. For example, a woman had just as much right as a man to demand the debt. The conjugal debt "took precedence over most other duties." Even in the case where a lord had called a man to rally. If his wife had insisted on the debt, "the wife's rights took precedence over the lord's." A similar situation applied for crusading. If a man wanted to go on crusade he needed permission from his wife, because "his departure would deprive her of the sexual solace that he owed to her."

== Modern day ==
Article 215 of the Napoleonic Code (1804) says that "spouses mutually oblige themselves to a community of life", derived from previous ecclesiastical notions of marital duty or conugal rights (devoir conjugal). In 2019, French courts determined that a married couple who ceased sexual relations with each other were not eligible for no-fault divorce as the wife had not performed her marital duties. This interpretation has been used during French court proceedings, but since the 1990s has been criticised by lawyers and women's rights groups, who view the concept of marital duty as ignoring sexual consent and dismissing concepts of marital rape. In 2025, the European Court of Human Rights ruled in H.W. v. France that the ruling in France had ignored the wife's right to respect for private and family life under Article 8 of the European Convention on Human Rights. In January 2026, the National Assembly introduced legislation to formally abolish the concept of marital duties in law.

== See also ==
- Canonical impediment
- Sacramental development
