= Harry Tindall =

American lawyer

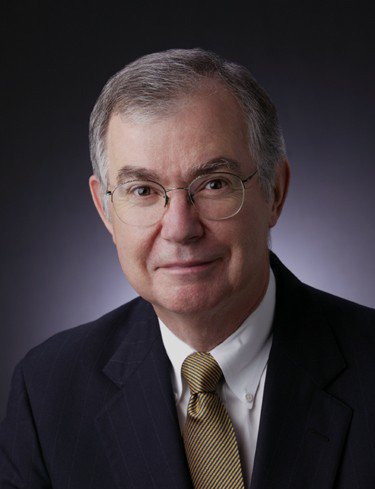
- Houston-based lawyer Harry Tindall
- Born: Harry Lee Tindall; May 5, 1942 (age 84); Corpus Christi, Texas, U.S.
- Education: University of Texas School of Law (JD)
- Occupations: Lawyer and law book author

Harry Lee Tindall (born May 5, 1942, in Corpus Christi, Texas) is a founding shareholder of Tindall & England, P.C. in Houston, Texas. The firm is ranked as a top tier firm by both Martindale Hubbell and U.S. News & World Report.

== Education and certifications ==
Tindall attended the University of Texas at Austin and graduated with a Bachelor of Arts in Government in 1964. Tindall subsequently attended the University of Texas School of Law and received his Juris Doctor in 1966. During his time as a law student in Austin, Tindall worked as a Legislative Assistant for a member of the Texas House of Representatives. He was a member of the national championship team in the Philip C. Jessup International Law Moot Court Competition in 1966.

Tindall is Board Certified in Family Law by the Texas Board of Legal Specialization and received his certification in 1975. Tindall is also a Certified Fellow of the American Academy of Matrimonial Lawyers since 1978. In 1992, Tindall became a Certified Fellow of the International Academy of Matrimonial Lawyers. In 1996, he attended the Harvard Law School Negotiation Workshop that ultimately led to his interest in collaborative law.

== Legal career ==
Tindall began his law practice with the Houston law firm, Fulbright & Jaworski in 1967. In 1973, Tindall established the firm of Tindall & Foster, P.C. with his college classmate, Charles C. Foster. The firm was reorganized in 2010 and Tindall created a new firm with Angela Pence England, Tindall & England, P.C. which specializes in complex property divorce cases, premarital agreements, interstate and international cases, parenting plans, collaborative family law, mediation, arbitration, litigation expert witness consultation, and legislative consultation.

=== Reform of Child Support and Community Property Laws ===
Beginning in the early 1980s, Tindall began lobbying to update Texas family law, especially in the areas of community property and child support. He served as Chair of the Supreme Court Advisory Committee on Child Support and Visitation Guidelines from 1985 to 1995. He led efforts to successfully pass a constitutional amendment to the Texas Constitution in 1987 to allow married persons to own community property with a right of survivorship. Tindall successfully secured passage of legislation to promote alternative dispute procedures including mediation, arbitration and collaboration.

=== Appointment to U.S. Commission on Interstate Child Support ===
In 1989, Tindall received an appointment to the U.S. Commission on Interstate Child Support, based on the recommendation of his Congressman, the Honorable William Archer (R–Texas). He was elected vice-chair of the commission and served as Chair of the Legal Issues Committee. The commission's report was submitted to Congress in 1992. Most of its recommendations were embodied in the Welfare Reform Act of 1996.

=== Work as Uniform Law Commissioner ===
In 1995, Tindall was appointed, by Texas Governor George W. Bush, as a Texas Commissioner to the Uniform Law Commission. In that capacity, he has served on the drafting committees for the Uniform Interstate Family Support Act, the Uniform Child Custody Jurisdiction and Enforcement Act, the Uniform Parentage Act (as Chair) and the Uniform Collaborative Law Act (as vice-chair). He served as Chair of the Joint Editorial Board for Uniform Family Law from 2001 to 2015 and as Chair of the Study Committee for the Model Veterans Court Act from 2013 to 2015. In 2015, Tindall was named Chair of the Drafting Committee for the Model Veterans Court Act, and was elected Life Commissioner to Uniform Law Commission.

=== Collaborative Law Reform ===
As a result of Tindall's lobbying efforts, Texas adopted the first collaborative law statute in the United States in 2001. This enactment marked an advance in law for families in transition and provided legally recognized means for private dispute resolution without court intervention. He has also led successful efforts to create the Houston Bar Association, Collaborative Law Section and the State Bar of Texas Collaborative Law Section. In 2009, the Uniform Law Commission approved the Uniform Collaborative Law Act and in 2011 Texas adopted the act. Over the course of his career, Tindall has written extensively on the subject of collaborative law.

== Law Book Author ==
In 1991, Tindall and University of Texas School of Law Professor John J. Sampson authored the first edition of Sampson and Tindall's Texas Family Code Annotated (Thomson Reuters), now in its 25th Annual Edition. Featuring author commentary to the Texas Family Code sections along with key case citations and references to leading continuing legal education articles, the book format was pioneering as a resource and continues to offer such information. Tindall received the Distinguished Author Award from Thomson Reuters in 1998. Tindall's law partner, Angela Pence England, became a co-author in 1998.

== Leadership to the Bar ==
Tindall is recognized as a leader in the Texas Bar and other professional organizations. He is Co-Presenter at the Biennial Sampson and Tindall Family Law Legislative Update sponsored by the University of Texas School of Law, Department of Continuing Legal Education. Tindall served as a Director of the International Academy of Collaborative Professionals from 2009 to 2012. He finished his terms as a Trustee for the Collaborative Law Institute of Texas in February 2012. In addition, Tindall held the position of Chair of the Family Law Section of the State Bar of Texas (1985–1987) and of the Family Law Section of the Houston Bar Association (1985–1986). Among his other leadership roles, Tindall chaired the Editorial Committee of the Texas Family Law Practice Manual (1981–1989) and served as the Course Director for the Advanced Family Law Course (1986) conducted by the State Bar of Texas. Tindall also was a member of the Supreme Court of Texas Advisory Committee on the Rules of Court (1984–1993).

== Honors ==
Tindall has been the recipient of many accolades and awards. Tindall was honored by the Alternative Dispute Resolution Section of the American Bar Association with the 2012 Lawyer as Problem Solver Award. The American Bar Association honored him with this award in recognition of Tindall as "a role model for lawyers who wish to transition from litigators to peacemakers.". Most recently, Tindall was awarded the Gay G. Cox Collaborative Law Award by the Collaborative Law Institute of Texas in 2014.
