= H.W. v. France =

ECHR ruling

On 23 January 2025, the European Court of Human Rights (ECtHR) ruled in H.W. v. France (13805/21) that a French woman was not at fault for her divorce due to not engaging in sexual relations with her husband during their marriage. The ruling overturned a French court decision that deemed her failure to fulfil "marital duties" (devoir conjugal) as grounds for fault.

== Legal background ==
The concept of "marital duty" or "conjugal rights" (devoir conjugal) in French law has its origins in Catholic canon law which viewed marriage as a framework for sexual reproduction, meaning sexual intercourse between husband and wife was seen as obligatory. Article 215 of the Napoleonic Code (1804) says that "spouses mutually oblige themselves to a community of life". While the law does not explicitly mandate sexual relations, judges have interpreted it as such.

This began to be criticised with the advent of the feminist movement in France. In 1990, Court of Cassation, France's highest court, authorised prosecution of spouses for rape or sexual assault (marital rape).

== French court ruling ==
H.W., a French woman, married J.C. in 1984. In 2002, her husband became physically abusive after she fell ill. By 2004, they ceased having sexual intercourse.

In 2012, they filed for divorce, which was granted. While H.W. wanted a no-fault divorce, J.C. argued H.W. was at fault for not performing her "marital duties". In 2018, a family court judge in Versailles ruled that H.W.'s health problems justified the absence of sexual relations; this was overturned by the Versailles Court of Appeal who said that H.W.'s refusal to have "intimate relations (relations intimes) with her husband" was a "fault". The Court of Cassation dismissed her appeal.

== ECtHR ruling ==
H.W. brought the case to the European Court of Human Rights (ECtHR) in 2021. On 23 January 2025, the ECtHR unanimously ruled that France violated H.W.'s right to respect for private and family life under Article 8 of the European Convention on Human Rights. The Court said that "any non-consensual sexual act constitutes a form of sexual violence" and emphasised that "consent to marriage could not imply consent to future sexual relations. Such an interpretation would be tantamount to denying that marital rape was reprehensible in nature". It further said that the concept of "marital duties" as interpreted by French courts was incompatible with modern understandings of consent, bodily autonomy and sexual freedom.

== Response ==
Lilia Mhissen, H.W's lawyer, said following the ruling: "I hope this decision will mark a turning point in the fight for women's rights in France. It is now imperative that France [...] takes concrete measures to eradicate this rape culture and promote a true culture of consent and mutual respect." Mhissen said that the ruling would stop French judges from making similar rulings where the refusal of sexual relations is considered grounds of divorce. The ruling came during a period of heightened debate in France about sexual consent, especially following high-profile cases like that of Gisèle Pelicot, where her husband and others were was convicted of drugging and raping her. The French feminist groups Fondation des Femmes and Collectif Féministe Contre le Viol highlighted the need for legal changes to reflect contemporary understandings of consent and autonomy. They celebrated the ruling as a victory for women's rights, pushing for legislative changes to ensure that marriage does not require "sexual servitude".

In January 2026, the National Assembly introduced legislation to formally abolish the concept of marital duties in law.

== See also ==
- Coverture
- Marital power
- Restitution of conjugal rights
