= Collaborative law =

Legal process to divorce without litigation

Collaborative law, also known as collaborative practice, divorce, or family law, is a legal process through which couples who have decided to separate or end their marriage work together with a team of collaboratively trained professionals including lawyers, divorce coaches, and financial professionals to achieve a settlement that meets the needs of both parties and their children without the need for litigation. The process allows parties to obtain a fair settlement while minimizing the time, cost, uncertainty, and acrimony that can accompany a litigious divorce or separation. Couples initiate this voluntary process by signing a contract (a "participation agreement") binding each other to the process and disqualifying their respective lawyer's right to represent either one in any future family-related litigation.

The collaborative law process can also facilitate a broad range of other family issues including disputes between parents and the drafting of pre- and post-marital (or prenuptial and postnuptial) contracts. Given the oppositional nature of the traditional method of creating pre-marital contracts, many couples prefer to begin their married life with documents drawn up consensually and mutually.

Collaborative law processes have the added benefit of being cost-efficient for the involved parties. Assigning all the necessary tasks to specialized professionals without duplicating effort reduces costs for the parties. These cost efficiencies, in addition to other potential benefits, have led parties in other contexts to explore the use of collaborative law to resolve disputes, including M&A transactions.

== History ==
This approach to conflict resolution was created in 1990 by Minnesota family lawyer Stuart Webb, who saw that traditional litigation was not always helpful to parties and their families, and often was damaging. Since 1990, the Collaborative Law movement has spread rapidly to most of the United States, Europe, Canada and Australia. Per the International Academy of Collaborative Professionals ("IACP"), more than 22,000 lawyers have been trained in Collaborative Law worldwide, with collaborative practitioners in at least 46 states. In some localities, Collaborative Law has become the predominant method for resolving divorce, cohabitation, and other family disputes. More than 1,250 lawyers have completed their training in England where collaborative law was launched in 2003.

The Collaborative Law movement has spread rapidly to most of the United States, Europe, Canada and Australia. More than 22,000 lawyers have been trained in Collaborative Law worldwide and more than 1,250 lawyers have completed their training in England and Wales where Collaborative Law was launched in 2003.

In Canada, interest in a collaborative legal approach has been growing since 2005, when several hundred family law attorneys were already practicing collaborative law. Lawyers had recognized the need for experts in fields outside of law such as mental health, lifestyle counseling, and financial planning, sourcing these backgrounds to provide better service to clients. Since financial matters drive much of divorce negotiations, collaborative law has driven demand for chartered financial divorce specialists with training in tax law, asset valuation, estate & property division, spousal support, pensions & retirement funds, etc. to fill the gap for lawyers in understanding long-term financial impacts outside of legal expertise.

The growth of the collaborative process in England and Wales has been encouraged by both the judiciary and the family lawyers organization, Resolution. In an address to London family lawyers in October 2009, the newly appointed Supreme Court Justice, Lord Kerr of Tonaghmore became the first member of the Supreme Court to publicly endorse Collaborative Law and called for its extension to other areas. Previously, in October 2008 the Hon. Mr Justice Coleridge, a High Court Judge of the Family Division, had promised that collaborative agreements would be fast tracked in the High Court of England and Wales. On 29 November 2011, speaking at a reception hosted by the group, Collaborative Family Law, Supreme Court Justice Lord Wilson of Culworth reaffirmed his commitment to Collaborative Law and other Family Dispute Resolution Services whilst criticizing the Government's plans to cut legal aid, which he called a "false economy".

== Organizations ==
The primary global collaborative organization is the International Academy of Collaborative Professionals (IACP), which was founded in the late 1990s by a group of northern California lawyers, psychotherapists, and financial planners. IACP has more than 2,400 members and there are more than 200 practice groups of collaborative practitioners worldwide. The IACP offers an opportunity for education and networking for its members as well as provides a resource for research on collaborative divorce.

The American Bar Association ("ABA"), the American Academy of Matrimonial Lawyers, and the International Academy of Matrimonial Lawyers ("IAML") all have Collaborative Law committees.

IACP is an interdisciplinary organization whose members include lawyers, mental health professionals, finance and financial divorce specialists. National Collaborative organizations have been established in many jurisdictions around the world, including Australia, Austria, Canada, the Czech Republic, England, France, Germany, Israel, Hong Kong, Kenya, New Zealand, Northern Ireland, the Republic of Ireland, Scotland, Switzerland, and Uganda, as well as the United States. There is an active on-line collaborative community on Be-fulfilled.org.

In England and Wales, Resolution, has assumed responsibility for the training and accreditation of all collaborative professionals. Almost one-third of all English family lawyers have now completed their collaborative training. In the Republic of Ireland regional collaborative law associations have been set up in cities such as Galway, Cork, and Dublin. In France the AFPDC was created in 2009 to develop and implement collaborative practice in France.

A number of states in the United States have their own individual organizations for collaborative law practitioners, including Collaborative Practice California, the Collaborative Family Law Council of Florida, Collaborative Law Institute of Georgia, the Collaborative Law Institute of Illinois, the Collaborative Law Institute of Minnesota, the Collaborative Law Institute of North Carolina, Collaborative Divorce Texas and the Massachusetts Collaborative Law Council, and the Washington DC Academy of Collaborative Professionals.

Further, most metropolitan areas, such as San Diego, Los Angeles, Tampa, Dallas, Raleigh, Cleveland, St. Louis and Chicago have local collaborative practice groups.

== Uniform Collaborative Law Act ==
In the United States, the Uniform Collaborative Law Act was adopted in 2009 by the Uniform Law Commission, and thereby became available to the individual States to enact as law. In 2010, the Uniform Collaborative Law Act was amended to add several options and renamed the Uniform Collaborative Law Rules and Act. As of June 2013, the Uniform Collaborative Law Act was enacted into law in the states of Utah, Nevada, Texas, Hawaii, Ohio, the District of Columbia, and Washington State, and passed by the Alabama Legislature but awaiting the Governor's signature, and was pending enactment in several additional U.S. states. In Texas, Houston-based family lawyer Harry Tindall has been instrumental in securing passage of the UCLA by the Texas Legislature. On 24 March 2016, Florida Governor Rick Scott signed the Collaborative Law Process Act, Florida's version of the Uniform Collaborative Law Act, which creates a statutory privilege that makes confidential communications had during the collaborative process.

The Overview to the Act provides a comprehensive and reliable history of the emergence of collaborative law in the United States.

In some states, like Florida, which were waiting on the passage of the Uniform Collaborative Law Act, local judges had been teaming up with collaborative professionals and creating local rules and administrative orders endorsing and regulating collaborative law.
