= 2026 Spokane County elections =

- November 3, 2026

The 2026 Spokane County elections were held on November 3, 2026, in Spokane County, Washington, with primary elections for certain offices being held on August 4. Two of the five seats of the Board of County Commissioners are up for election, as well as six of the countywide elected officials, the Sheriff, the Treasurer, the Auditor, the Assessor and the Prosecutor, three of which are open seats.

== Board of County Commissioners ==
2026 Spokane County Board of Commissioners election
- November 3, 2026

2 of the 5 districts in the Spokane County Board of Commissioners 3 seats needed for a majority
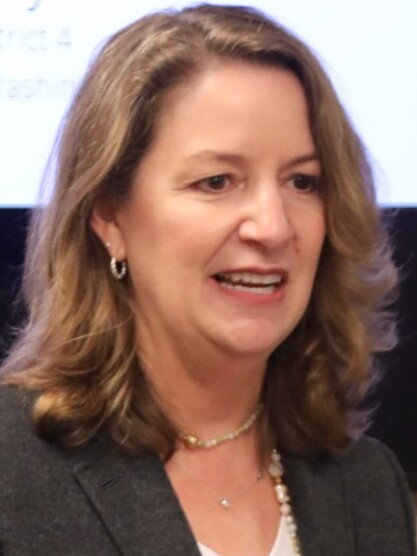

	Majority party	Minority party
Leader	Mary Brooks (Note: formerly Mary Kuney) (retired)
Party	Republican	Democratic
Leader since	January 10, 2023
Leader's seat	District 4
Seats before	3	2
Seats after	3	2
Seat change	Steady	Steady
Seats up	1	1
Races won	1	1
- Republican: 50–60% Democratic: >90% No election
Chair before election
Mary Brooks (Note: formerly Mary Kuney)
Republican
Elected Chair
TBD

Two of the five seats of the Spokane County Board of Commissioners are up for election to four-year terms. In 2018, the Washington State Legislature passed a law to mandate that Spokane County elect five commissioners instead of the previous three, and that each commissioner have their own district instead of all running as a county-wide slate. As such, this is the first election in which the law fully takes effect.

=== District 2 ===
2026 Spokane County Board of Commissioners election, District 2
- November 3, 2026

Candidate	Amber Waldref	Write-in
Party	Democratic	–
Popular vote	25,663	1,835
Percentage	92.4%	6.6%
- Results by precinct Waldref: 80–90% 90–100%
Comissioner before election
Amber Waldref
Democratic
Elected Comissioner
Amber Waldref
Democratic

Amber Waldref was first elected in 2022 with 55% of the vote. She is running for re-election and is uncontested.

==== Candidates ====
===== Advanced to general =====
- Amber Waldref (Democratic), incumbent County Commissioner (2023–present)

==== Endorsements ====
Amber Waldref (D)

Labor unions

- Spokane Regional Labor Council, AFL-CIO
- SEIU Healthcare 1199NW
- SEIU 775

Organizations

- Fuse Washington
- National Women's Political Caucus of Washington
- Spokane County Young Democrats

Political parties

- Spokane County Democratic Party

=== Fundraising ===
Campaign finance reports as of November 14, 2026
Candidate	Raised	Spent	Cash on hand
Amber Waldref (D)	$23,359	$13,418	$9,941
Source: Washington State Public Disclosure Commission

==== Results ====
===== Primary election =====
Nonpartisan primary results
Party	Candidate	Votes	%
Democratic	Amber Waldref	15,644	91.4
Write-in		1,264	7.3
Total votes		16,908	100

===== General election =====
2026 Spokane County Board of Commissioners, District 2 election
Party	Candidate	Votes	%
Democratic	Amber Waldref	25,663	92.44
Write-in		1,835	6.61
Total votes		27,498	100

=== District 4 ===
2026 Spokane County Board of Commissioners election, District 4
- November 3, 2026

Candidate	Suzanne Schmidt	Rachelle Miller (Note: Ran as a write-in candidate during the primary, garnered enough votes to qualify for the general election ballot)
Party	Republican	Independent (Note: Labeled as "Independent Party" on the ballot)
Popular vote	28,028	22,514
Percentage	55.3%	44.4%
- Results by precinct Schmidt: 50–60% 60–70% 70–80% 80–90% Miller: 40–50% 50–60% 60–70% Tie: 40–50% 50%
Comissioner before election
Mary Brooks (Kuney)
Republican
Elected Comissioner
Suzanne Schmidt
Republican

Incumbent Commissioner Mary Brooks (elected as Mary Kuney), a Republican and the Chair of the Commission, who was appointed by Governor Jay Inslee in 2017 to fill a vacancy, has announced she will not seek re-election. Incumbent Commissioner Amber Waldref has announced she is running for re-election.

Washington State Representative Suzanne Schmidt launched her campaign for Position 4 shortly after Brooks announced her retirement. She was officially uncontested in the primary, however social worker Rachelle Miller ran as a write-in candidate in the primary and secured enough votes to be placed on the general election ballot.

==== Candidates ====
===== Advanced to general =====
- Suzanne Schmidt (Republican), state representative from the 4th district (2023–present)
- Rachelle Miller (American Independent), social worker (previous write-in candidate)

===== Declined =====
- Mary Brooks (formerly Mary Kuney) (Republican), incumbent County Commissioner (2017–present)

==== Endorsements ====
Rachelle Miller (I)

Labor unions

- Spokane Regional Labor Council, AFL-CIO
- American Federation of State, County and Municipal Employees Local 1553
- International Association of Fire Fighters Local 29

Organizations

- Fuse Washington
Suzanne Schmidt (R)

Statewide officals

- Sam Reed, former Washington Secretary of State (2001–2013)

Organizations

- Mainstream Republicans of Washington
- Washington Association of Retailers
- Inland Northwest Associated General Contractors

=== Fundraising ===
Campaign finance reports as of November 14, 2026
Candidate	Raised	Spent	Cash on hand
Suzanne Schmidt (R)	$73,006	$57,805	$15,201
Rachelle Miller (I)	$28,563	$24,446	$4,117
Source: Washington State Public Disclosure Commission

==== Results ====
===== Primary election =====
Nonpartisan primary results
Party	Candidate	Votes	%
Republican	Suzanne Schmidt	22,128	90.4
Write-in		2,114	8.6
Total votes		24,242	100

===== General election =====
2026 Spokane County Board of Commissioners, District 4 election
Party	Candidate	Votes	%
Republican	Suzanne Schmidt	28,028	55.28
Independent	Rachelle Miller	2,114	44.41
Write-in		104	0.21
Total votes		30,246	100

== Auditor ==
2026 Spokane County Auditor election
- November 3, 2026
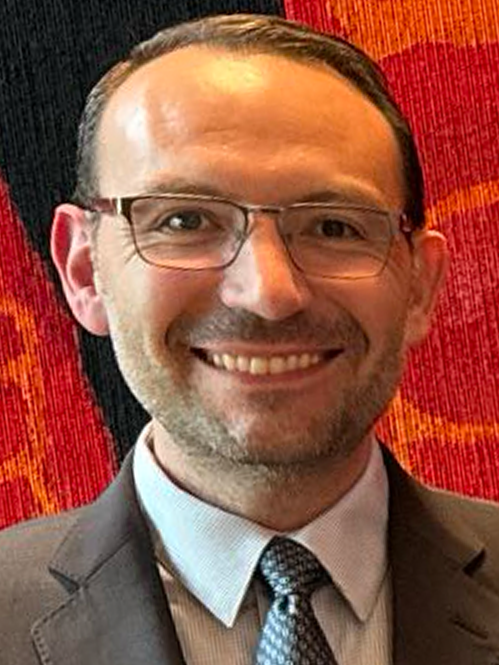

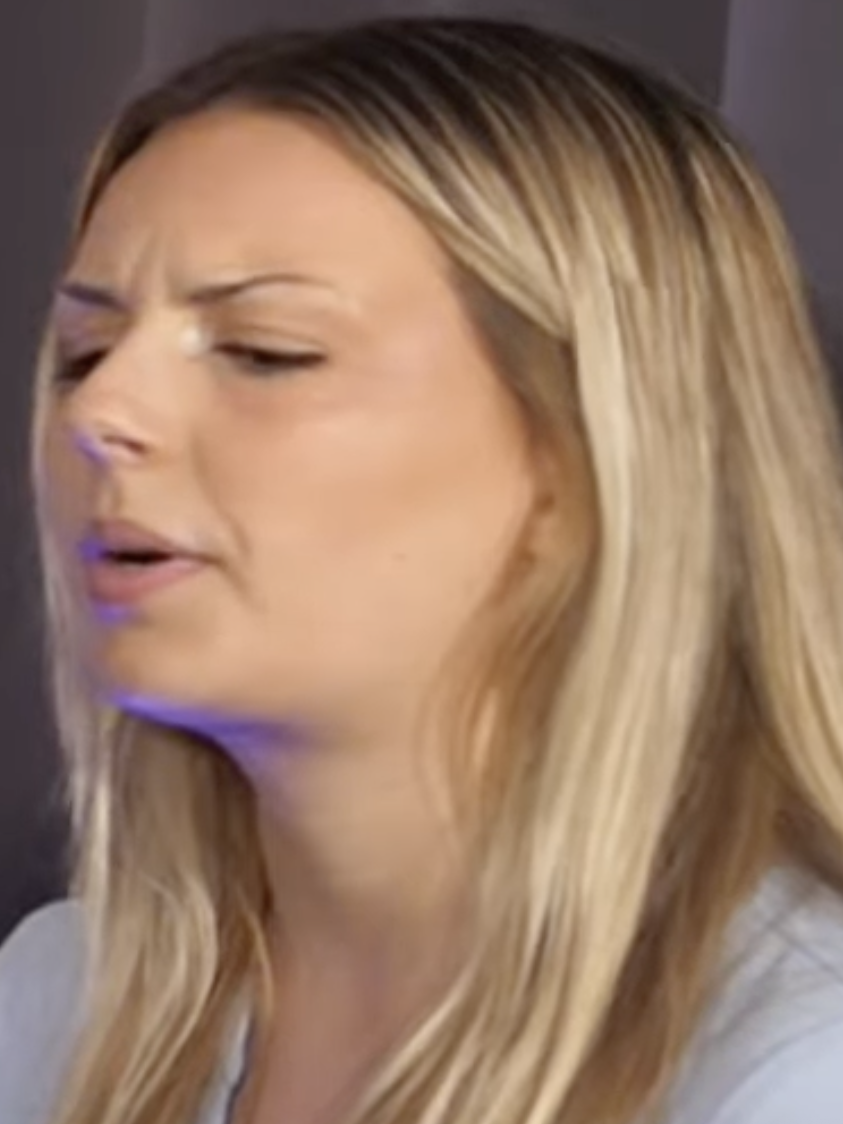

Candidate	Michael Cathcart	Callie Gee	Dale Whitaker
Party	Republican	Democratic	Republican
First round	39,477; 27.8%	65,551; 46.1%	36,837; 25.9%
Runoff	120,012; 52.1%	109,902; 47.7%	Eliminated
- Cathcart: 50–60% 60–70% 70–80% 80–90% Gee: 50–60% 60–70% 70–80% 80–90% Tie: 50%
Auditor before election
Vicky Dalton
Democratic
Elected Auditor
Michael Cathcart
Republican

Incumbent Auditor Vicky Dalton, the only county-wide elected Democrat, is retiring. She has endorsed Republican Spokane city councilman Michael Cathcart.

=== Candidates ===
==== Advanced to general ====
- Michael Cathcart (Republican), Spokane city councilman (2019–present)
- Callie Gee (Democratic), Vice Chair of the Spokane County Young Democrats

==== Eliminated in primary ====
- Dale Whitaker (Republican), accountant and runner-up for Secretary of State in 2024

==== Declined ====
- Vicky Dalton (Democratic), incumbent Auditor

==== Endorsements ====
Michael Cathcart (R)

U.S. representatives

- Michael Baumgartner, WA–05 (2025–present)

Statewide officials

- Sam Reed, former Washington Secretary of State (2001–2013) and Thurston County Auditor (1978–2000)

State senators

- Erik Poulsen former LD-34 (2002–2007) (Democratic)

County officials

- Vicky Dalton, incumbent Auditor (1998–present) (Democratic)
- Tim Fitzgerald, Clerk (2014–present)
- Josh Kerns, former Chair of the Spokane County Commission (2021–2023) and Commissioner (2016–present)
- Tom Konis, Assessor (2018–present)

Municipal officials

- Jonathan Bingle, former Spokane councilman (2020–2025)
- Betsy Wilkerson, Spokane councilwoman (2020–present) and city council President (2023–present) (Democratic)
- Ben Stuckart, former city council President (2012–2019) and runner-up for Mayor of Spokane in 2019 (Democratic)

Organizations

- Mainstream Republicans of Washington
Callie Gee (D)

State senators

- Marcus Riccelli, LD-03 (2025–present)

Organizations

- Spokane County Young Democrats (group's vice chair)
Dale Whitaker (R)

Party officials

- ~~Jim Walsh, chair of the Washington State Republican Party (2023–present) and state representative from LD-19, Position 1 (2016–present)~~ (endorsement rescinded after primary)

State representatives

- ~~Rob Chase, LD-04, Position 2 (2021–2023, 2025–present)~~ (endorsement rescinded after primary)
- ~~Bob McCaslin, former LD-04, Position 2 (2015–2021)~~ (endorsement rescinded after primary)
- ~~Matt Marshall, LD-02, Position 2 (2025–present) and founder of the Washington State Three Percenters~~ (endorsement rescinded after primary)

=== Fundraising ===
Campaign finance reports as of November 14, 2026
Candidate	Raised	Spent	Cash on hand
Dale Whitaker (R)*	$63,996	$62,874	$1,122
Michael Cathcart (R)	$58,260	$56,360	$1,900
Callie Gee (D)	$41,020	$27,267	$13,753
Source: Washington State Public Disclosure Commission

* Did not advance to the general election

==== Results ====
===== Primary election =====
Nonpartisan primary results
Party	Candidate	Votes	%
Democratic	Callie Gee	65,551	46.1
Republican	Michael Cathcart	39,477	27.8
Republican	Dale Whitaker	36,837	25.9
Write-in		205	0.1
Total votes		142,070	100

===== General election =====
2026 Spokane County Auditor election
Party	Candidate	Votes	%
Republican	Michael Cathcart	120,012	52.13
Democratic	Callie Gee	109,902	47.74
Write-in		244	0.11
Total votes		230,158	100

== Clerk ==
2026 Spokane County Clerk election
- November 3, 2026

Candidate	Dave Lucas	Elliot Robison
Party	Republican	Democratic
Popular vote	118,812	109,300
Percentage	52%	47.9%
- Lucas: 50–60% 60–70% 70–80% 80–90% Robison: 50–60% 60–70% 70–80% 80–90% Tie: 50%
Clerk before election
Tim Fitzgerald
Republican
Elected Clerk
Dave Lucas
Republican

Incumbent Tim Fitzgerald retired after serving as County Clerk since 2014. He has endorsed Cheney Court Administrator Dave Lucas to replace him.

=== Advanced to general ===
- Dave Lucas (Republican), Cheney Municipal Court Administrator and runner-up for State Representative LD-03 in 2018
- Elliot Robison (Democratic), bartender

=== Declined ===
- Tim Fitzgerald (Republican), incumbent Clerk (2014–present)

==== Endorsements ====
Dave Lucas (R)

Statewide officals

- Sam Reed, former Washington Secretary of State (2001–2013)

State senators

- Mike Padden, former LD-04 (2011–2025) and Spokane County District Court Judge (1995–2007)

County officials

- Tim Fitzgerald, incumbent Clerk (2014–present)

Organizations

- Associated Builders and Contractors, Inland Pacific
- Mainstream Republicans of Washington

=== Fundraising ===
Campaign finance reports as of November 14, 2026
Candidate	Raised	Spent	Cash on hand
Elliot Robison (D)	$35,549	$36,482	–$933
Dave Lucas (R)	$21,844	$20,592	$1,252
Source: Washington State Public Disclosure Commission

==== Results ====
===== Primary election =====
Nonpartisan primary results
Party	Candidate	Votes	%
Republican	Dave Lucas	73,294	51.8
Democratic	Elliot Robison	67,795	48.0
Write-in		245	0.2
Total votes		141,334	100

===== General election =====
2026 Spokane County Clerk election
Party	Candidate	Votes	%
Republican	Dave Lucas	118,812	52.02
Democratic	Elliot Robison	109,300	47.86
Write-in		218	0.10
Total votes		228,330	100

== Sheriff ==
2026 Spokane County Sheriff election
- November 3, 2026
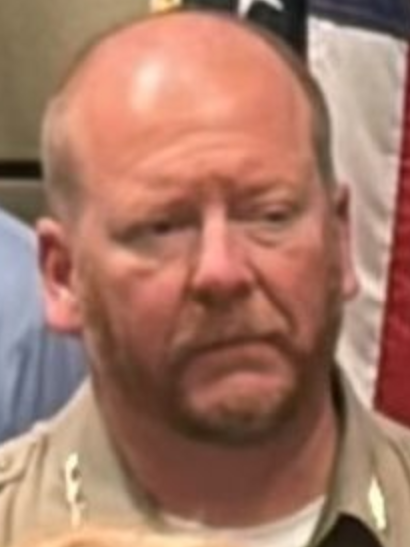

Candidate	John Nowels	Write-in
Party	Republican	–
Popular vote	152,987	10,984
Percentage	93%	6.9%
- Nowels: 70–80% 80–90% 90–100%
Sheriff before election
John Nowels
Republican
Elected Sheriff
John Nowels
Republican

Incumbent Sheriff John Nowels was elected in 2022 with 57.82% of the vote. He is running for re-election unopposed.

=== Candidates ===
==== Advanced to general ====
- John Nowels (Republican), incumbent Sheriff (2023–present)

=== Endorsements ===
John Nowels (R)

State representatives

- Suzanne Schmidt, LD-04, Position 1 (2016–present)

=== Fundraising ===
Campaign finance reports as of November 14, 2026
Candidate	Raised	Spent	Cash on hand
John Nowels (R)	$62,280	$50,492	$11,788
Source: Washington State Public Disclosure Commission

==== Results ====
===== Primary election =====
Nonpartisan primary results
Party	Candidate	Votes	%
Republican	John Nowels	94,039	91.4
Write-in		6,520	6.5
Total votes		100,559	100

===== General election =====
2026 Spokane County Sheriff election
Party	Candidate	Votes	%
Republican	John Nowels	152,987	93.01
Write-in		10,984	6.68
Total votes		163,971	100

== Prosecuting Attorney ==
2026 Spokane County Prosecuting Attorney election
- November 3, 2026

Candidate	Preston McCollam	Danny Tarkenton
Party	Republican	No party preference
Popular vote	121,641	100,956
Percentage	54.4%	45.2%
- Lucas: 50–60% 60–70% 70–80% 80–90% Tarkenton: 50–60% 60–70% 70–80%
Prosecuting Attorney before election
Preston McCollam (Note: McCollam was unanimously appointed Prosecuting Attorney on September 9, 2025 by the Board of County Commissioners after incumbent Larry Haskell resigned)
Republican
Elected Prosecuting Attorney
Preston McCollam
Republican

Incumbent Prosecuting Attorney Larry Haskell resigned on July 18, 2025, citing his age. The Spokane County Board of Commissioners voted unanimously to appoint Chief Criminal Prosecuting Attorney Preston McCollam to fill the vacancy. He is running for a full term.

Steve Garvin, an assistant Washington Attorney General attempted to get the appointment for prosecutor after incumbent Haskell resigned and announced his intention to run against McCollam for a full term, raising over $23,000 in campaign contributins. However, he later withdrew for unknown reasons.

On April 20, 2026, former deputy prosecutor Danny Tarkenton announced her candidacy for Prosecuting Attorney. Notably, she is running as independent with no Democrats in the race. However, almost all elected Democrats and liberal-leaning organizations are supporting her. This is in an effort by the Democratic Party to win traditionally unwinnable, red areas by running candidates under an independent lable.

On August 4, 2026, both candidates advanced to the general, with an extremely close result, 51-49 McCollam to Tarkenton. Initially, Tarkenton lead with just over 50%, by the end of ballot counting, McCollam closed the gap. This was the closest race among all primary elections in the county.

=== Candidates ===
==== Advanced to general ====
- Preston McCollam (Republican), incumbent Prosecuting Attorney (2025–present)
- Danny Tarkenton (No party preference), former Spokane County deputy prosecutor

==== Withdrawn ====
- Steve Garvin (Republican), assistant Attorney General

==== Declined ====
- Larry Haskell (Republican), former Prosecuting Attorney (2015–2025)

==== Endorsements ====
Preston McCollam (R)

U.S. Executive branch officials

- Jim McDevitt, former U.S. Attorney for the Eastern District of Washington (2001–2010)

U.S. representatives

- Michael Baumgartner, WA–05 (2025–present)

State senators

- Mike Padden, former LD-04 (2011–2025) and Spokane County District Court Judge (1995–2007)

County officials

- Donald Brockett former Spokane County Prosecuting Attorney (1969–1994) (Democratic) (deceased)
- Larry Haskell, former Spokane County Prosecuting Attorney (2015–2025)
- Jim Sweetser, former Spokane County Prosecuting Attorney (1995–1998) (Democratic)
- Steve Tucker former Spokane County Prosecuting Attorney (1999–2014)

Labor unions

- Spokane County Sheriff's Association
- Spokane Police Guild
Danny Tarkenton (NPP)

State representatives

- Natasha Hill, LD-03 (2024–present) (Democratic)

Political parties

- Green Party of Washington State

Organizations

- Fuse Washington

=== Fundraising ===
Campaign finance reports as of November 14, 2026
Candidate	Raised	Spent	Cash on hand
Preston McCollam (R)	$137,245	$126,426	$10,819
Danny Tarkenton (NPP)	$50,674	$57,803	–$7,129
Steve Garvin (R) (Note: Withdrawn candidate)	$23,136	$23,136	$0
Source: Washington State Public Disclosure Commission

==== Results ====
===== Primary election =====
Nonpartisan primary results
Party	Candidate	Votes	%
Republican	Preston McCollam	69,504	50.6
No party preference	Danny Tarkenton	67,123	48.7
Write-in		685	0.5
Total votes		142,070	100

===== General election =====
2026 Spokane County Prosecuting Attorney election
Party	Candidate	Votes	%
Republican	Preston McCollam	121,641	54.41
No party preference	Danny Tarkenton	100,956	45.16
Write-in		873	0.39
Total votes			

== Treasurer ==
2026 Spokane County Treasurer election
- November 3, 2026

Candidate	Mike Volz	Write-in
Party	Republican	–
Popular vote	152,028	9,001
Percentage	94.1%	5.7%
- Volz: 70–80% 80–90% 90–100%
Treasurer before election
Mike Volz (Note: Volz was unanimously appointed Treasurer on February 3, 2026 by the Board of County Commissioners to replace Michael Baumgartner, who resigned to become U.S. representative)
Republican
Elected Treasurer
Mike Volz
Republican

Incumbent Treasurer Michael Baumgartner resigned on January 3, 2025 after he was elected to the United States House of Representatives. Under Washington State law, the local county Republican Party nominates three individuals for appointment to the Board of County Commissioners. Baumgartner had originally endorsed Matt Hanson for the appointment process to succeed him, but he later withdrew, citing that he had "too much work coming up this year."

On February 3, 2026, Mike Volz, the Deputy Treasurer and state representative was appointed by the Board of County Commissioners to fill the vacancy.

Volz is running for a full term. He is uncontested.

=== Candidates ===
==== Advanced to general ====
- Mike Volz (Republican), incumbent Treasurer and state representative from the 6th district (2017–present)

==== Withdrawn ====
- Matt Hanson (Republican), businessman
- Mike Kelly (Republican), businessman (ran for Spokane Valley city council)

==== Endorsements ====
Matt Hanson (R) (withdrawn)

U.S. representatives

- Michael Baumgartner, WA-05 (2025–present) and former Treasurer (2018–2025)

=== Fundraising ===
Campaign finance reports as of November 17, 2026
Candidate	Raised	Spent	Cash on hand
Mike Volz (R)	$280	$4,134	–$3,854
Michael Baumgartner (R) (Note: Withdrawn candidate)	$32	$$2,919	–$2,887
Source: Washington State Public Disclosure Commission

==== Results ====
===== Primary election =====
Nonpartisan primary results
Party	Candidate	Votes	%
Republican	Mike Volz	93,706	93.2
Write-in		5,833	5.8
Total votes		100,559	100

===== General election =====
2026 Spokane County Treasurer election
Party	Candidate	Votes	%
Republican	Mike Volz	152,028	94.11
Write-in		9,001	5.57
Total votes		161,029	100

== Assessor ==
2026 Spokane County Assessor election
- November 3, 2026

Candidate	Tom Konis	Write-in
Party	Republican	–
Popular vote	150,858	10,010
Percentage	93.5%	6.2%
Assessor before election
Tom Konis
Republican
Elected Assessor
Tom Konis
Republican

Incumbent Assessor Tom Konis was re-elected in 2022 unopposed with 95% of the vote. He is running for re-election.

=== Candidates ===
==== Declared ====
- Tom Konis (Republican), incumbent Assessor (2018–present)

=== Fundraising ===
Campaign finance reports as of August 19, 2026
Candidate	Raised	Spent	Cash on hand
Tom Konis (R)	$0	$0	$0
Source: Washington State Public Disclosure Commission

==== Results ====
===== Primary election =====
Nonpartisan primary results
Party	Candidate	Votes	%
Republican	Tom Konis	92,796	93.6
Write-in		5,986	6.0
Total votes		98,782	100

===== General election =====
2026 Spokane County Assessor election
Party	Candidate	Votes	%
Republican	Tom Konis		
Total votes			
