= Rob Chase =

American politician and businessman (b. 1953)

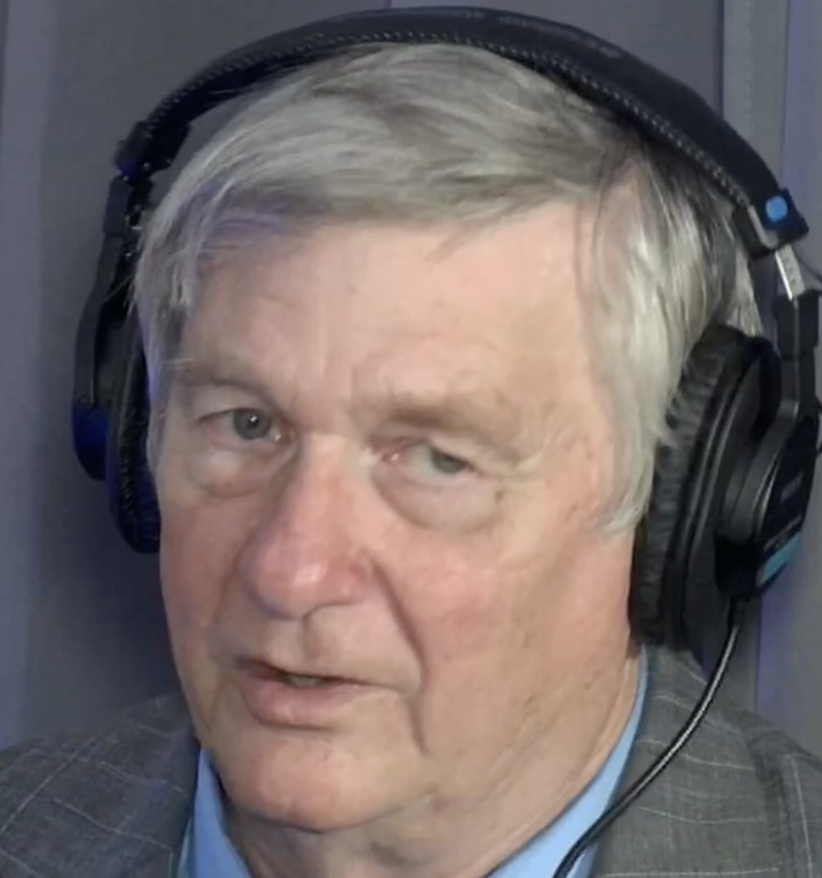
- Chase in 2024

Member of the Washington House of Representatives from the 4th district
- Incumbent
- Assumed office January 13, 2025 Serving with Suzanne Schmidt
- Preceded by: Leonard Christian
- In office January 11, 2021 – January 9, 2023
- Preceded by: D.E. "Skip" Chilberg
- Succeeded by: Leonard Christian

27th Treasurer of Spokane County
- In office January 1, 2011 – January 1, 2019
- Preceded by: Bob McCaslin Jr.
- Succeeded by: Michael Baumgartner

Personal details
- Born: Robert Steven Chase; August 2, 1953 (age 72) Denver, Colorado, U.S.
- Party: Republican
- Children: 4
- Education: Eastern Washington University (BA)

Robert Steven Chase (born August 2, 1953) is an American politician and businessman. A Republican, he was a member of the Washington House of Representatives from the 4th district. Elected in 2020, he assumed office on January 11, 2021.

== Education ==
Chase earned a Bachelor of Arts degree in business administration from Eastern Washington University.

== Career ==
Chase is a former real estate agent. In 2002, he unsuccessfully ran for Congress as a Libertarian Party candidate against Republican incumbent George Nethercutt; in the 2002 blanket primary, he won 5% of the vote. In 2010, Chase won election as Spokane County treasurer; as a write-in candidate, he qualified in the primary election for the general election ballot, and went on to defeat Democratic incumbent Skip Chillberg. He was reelected to the position in 2014, defeating fellow Republican Mary Kuney. He worked for Ron Paul's presidential campaigns in 2008 and 2012 in Eastern Washington. During his time as county treasurer, Chase was one of the chief proponents of a public entity bid to acquire Avista, either by an electric cooperative or by a special-purpose district, and he tried to block Avista's sale to Hydro One.

In 2018, Chase ran for Spokane County Commission, but was defeated by Kuney. In 2020, he announced that he would challenge incumbent Congresswoman Cathy McMorris Rodgers in the Republican primary for Washington's 5th congressional district. He later dropped out of that race to run for Washington House of Representatives instead. He defeated Democratic nominee Lance Gurel in the November 2020 general election. Chase's district, the Fourth Legislative District, covers the communities of Spokane Valley, Washington and Liberty Lake; parts of Mead; and northwest Spokane County.

Chase is a vocal supporter of Matt Shea, a Washington state representative who was expelled from the House Republican Caucus after an independent investigation determined that Shea participated in acts of domestic terrorism. Chase holds the state House seat formerly held by Shea. In 2020, Chase said, "I stand by Matt Shea. I don't think he did anything illegal." Chase supports the creation of a create a new 51st state (the "State of Liberty") to be formed by the secession of Eastern Washington from the rest of the state, an idea previously promoted by Shea; Chase introduced legislation for Eastern Washington secession in 2021.

Chase has previously promoted various extremist conspiracy theories; in online writings, he has promoted QAnon, birtherism, and chemtrails. In 2019, Chase shared a link on Facebook to a report baselessly claiming that the September 11 attacks were an inside job involving "the Zionists" and others, and that the "Boston Bombing, Sandy Hook, Orlando, San Bernardino, and Las Vegas" attacks were all "false flag" hoaxes.

After taking office in 2021, Chase hired Cecily Wright, the former chair of the Spokane County Republican Party and a longtime associate, as his legislative assistant. Wright was ousted from her chairmanship of the county party in 2018, after she defended white nationalist James Allsup, who had been unseated as a Whitman County precinct committee officer after he marched at the violent far-right Unite the Right rally in Charlottesville, Virginia, in 2017. Chase defended Wright as having "a good reputation" and being "dependable and loyal."

Chase has pushed Donald Trump's false claim that the 2020 presidential election was marred by fraud. Although no evidence supports this claim, in August 2021, Chase and four other state Republican lawmakers (Robert Sutherland, Jim Walsh, Vicki Kraft, and Bob McCaslin Jr.) held an unofficial hearing at a Snohomish, Washington church calling for "forensic audit" to take place in Washington State similar to the criticized Arizona audit. The organizers of the event invited speakers who have falsely claimed voter fraud. Trump was defeated by Joe Biden in Washington state by almost 785,000 votes.

During the COVID-19 pandemic, Chase promoted COVID-19 misinformation. In a July 2021 Facebook post, Chase compared the COVID-19 vaccines to Nazi medical experimentation and falsely claimed that the COVID-19 vaccine "is not a vaccine"; that the vaccine "is not tested"; that the vaccine was the result of a nefarious conspiracy orchestrated by George Soros; and there are many "natural cures" for COVID-19. None of these claims are true.

In 2022, Chase was unseated by businessman and former appointed representative Leonard Christian. Christian attributed his victory to Chase's far-right views.

In 2024, Chase was reelected to the Fourth Legislative District.
