= Bob McCaslin =

Bob McCaslin may refer to:

- Bob McCaslin Sr. (1926–2011), American politician
- Bob McCaslin Jr. (born 1957), American politician
