= Senator Peirce =

Senator Peirce may refer to:

- Benjamin Peirce (librarian) (1778–1831), Massachusetts State Senate
- Clarence V. Peirce (1850–1923), Wisconsin State Senate
- Ed Peirce (died 1947), Washington State Senate
- Edward C. Peirce (1895–1955), Massachusetts State Senate

== See also ==
- William A. Pirce (1824–1891), Rhode Island State Senate
- Senator Pearce (disambiguation)
- Senator Pierce (disambiguation)
