= Washington's 4th legislative district =

State legislature district

Coordinates: 47°46′N 117°12′W

Washington 4th legislative district map

Washington's 4th legislative district is one of forty-nine districts in Washington state for representation in the state legislature. The district borders Idaho to the east, Washington's 6th legislative district to the south, Spokane to the west, and Washington's 7th legislative district on the north.

The largely suburban district is represented by state senator Leonard Christian and state representatives Suzanne Schmidt (position 1) and Rob Chase (position 2), all Republicans.

== Past legislators ==
=== Statehood-1932 ===
During this period, the state senate and state house districts were geographically distinct.

Year	Senate		House			
Year	Senator	Senate District Geography	House Position 1	House Position 2	House Position 3	House District Geography
1st (1889-1890)	F. H. Luce (R)	Adams, Franklin, Lincoln, part and Okanogan				
2nd (1891-1892)	E. B. Hyde (R)	Spokane County (part)	House District Established			Spokane County (part)
2nd (1891-1892)	E. B. Hyde (R)	Spokane County (part)	J. E. Gandy (R)	A. G. Hanson (R)	Louis Reinhardt (R)	Spokane County (part)
3rd (1893-1894)	C. W. Ide (R)	Spokane County (part)	H. W. Greenberg (R)	W. H. Ludden (R)	F. M. Tull (R)	Spokane County (part)
4th (1895-1896)	C. W. Ide (R)	Spokane County (part)	F. M. Tull (R)	J. E. Gandy (R)	O. B. Nelson (R)	Spokane County (part)
5th (1897-1898)	H. E. Houghton (P.P.) (Note: Deceased Aug. 25, 1897)	Spokane County (part)	John B. Johnston (Silver Rep.)	W. B. Roberts (Silver Rep.)	Louis J. McAtee (D)	Spokane County (part)
5th (1897-1898)	Vacant (Note: The seat was vacant until an appointment in 1899. The legislature did not convene while the seat was vacant.)	Spokane County (part)	John B. Johnston (Silver Rep.)	W. B. Roberts (Silver Rep.)	Louis J. McAtee (D)	Spokane County (part)
6th (1899-1900)	Herman D. Crow (R) (Note: Appointed 1899 to serve unexpired term)	Spokane County (part)	Harry Rosenhaupt (R)	R. N. McLean (R)	J. F. Sexton (R)	Spokane County (part)
7th (1901-1902)	Herman D. Crow (R)	Spokane County (part)	F. D. Shaw (R)	Harry Rosenhaupt (R)	W. Storey Buck (R)	Spokane County (part)
8th (1903-1904)	Herman D. Crow (R)	Spokane County (part)	Samuel A. Wells (R)	Ellsworth C. Whitney (R)	Position Eliminated (Note: The redistricting plan passed by the legislature in 1901 took effect for the 1903 election)	Spokane County (part)
9th (1905-1906)	Walker A. Henry (R)	Spokane County (part)	Charles A. Ratcliffe (R)	John A. Fancher (R)		Spokane County (part)
10th (1907-1908)	W. D. Scott (R) (Note: Elected to serve unexpired term)	Spokane County (part)	J. F. Congleton (R)	John A. Fancher (R)		Spokane County (part)
11th (1909-1910)	Richard A. Hutchinson (R)	Spokane County (part)	John A. Fancher (R)	Albert M. Stevens (R)		Spokane County (part)
12th (1911-1912)	Richard A. Hutchinson (R)	Spokane County (part)	Clyde A. Miller (R)	Albert M. Stevens (R)		Spokane County (part)
13th (1913-1914)	Richard A. Hutchinson (Prog.)	Spokane County (part)	Albert M. Stevens (Prog.)	George L. Reid (Prog.)		Spokane County (part)
14th (1915-1916)	Richard A. Hutchinson (Prog.)	Spokane County (part)	Albert M. Stevens (R)	A. R. Stratton (R)		Spokane County (part)
15th (1917-1918)	Richard A. Hutchinson (R)	Spokane County (part)	Olaf L. Olsen (R)	A. R. Stratton (R)		Spokane County (part)
16th (1919-1920)	Richard A. Hutchinson (R)	Spokane County (part)	Olaf L. Olsen (R)	A. R. Stratton (R)		Spokane County (part)
17th (1921-1922)	Richard A. Hutchinson (R)	Spokane County (part)	Olaf L. Olsen (R)	A. R. Stratton (R)		Spokane County (part)
17th (1921-1922)	Harve H. Phipps (R) (Note: Elected in 1922 to serve unexpired term)	Spokane County (part)	Olaf L. Olsen (R)	A. R. Stratton (R)		Spokane County (part)
18th (1923-1924)	Harve H. Phipps (R)	Spokane County (part)	Charles E. Peterson (R)	Olaf L. Olsen (R) (Note: Resigned May 1925)		Spokane County (part)
19th (1925-1926)	Daniel Morgan (R)	Spokane County (part)	Charles E. Peterson (R)	Olaf L. Olsen (R)		Spokane County (part)
19th (1925-1926)	Daniel Morgan (R)	Spokane County (part)	Charles E. Peterson (R)	Thomas McCormick (R) (Note: Elected in special election Oct. 1925 to serve unexpired term)		Spokane County (part)
20th (1927-1928)	Daniel Morgan (R)	Spokane County (part)	Charles E. Peterson (R)	Arthur L. Hooper (R)		Spokane County (part)
21st (1929-1930)	Harve H. Phipps (R)	Spokane County (part)	Sam W. Webb (R)	Charles E. Peterson (R)		Spokane County (part)
22nd (1931-1932)	Harve H. Phipps (R)	Spokane County (part)	Charles E. Peterson (R)	Harry C. Huse (D)		Spokane County (part)

=== 1933-Present ===
After the passage of Initiative 57 and the 1930 redistricting cycle, the state senate and state house districts were geographically similar. While some senate districts would occasionally be broken up into house seats A and B, seats A and B were always contained in the Senate district boundaries.

The 4th legislative district's state senate and house seats are identical geographically from 1933 to the present day.

Year	Senate	House		District Geography
Year	Senator	House Position 1	House Position 2	District Geography
23rd (1933-1934)	Ed Peirce (D)	Carl J. Luck (D)	John R. Sullivan (D)	Spokane County (part)
24th (1935-1936)	Ed Peirce (D)	Alfred E. Holt (D)	Carl J. Luck (D)	Spokane County (part)
25th (1937-1938)	Alfred E. Holt (D)	Mel Butler (D)	Carl J. Luck (D)	Spokane County (part)
26th (1939-1940)	Alfred E. Holt (D)	Thomas H. Bienz (D)	Roderick A. Lindsay (D)	Spokane County (part)
27th (1941-1942)	Roderick A. Lindsay (D) (Note: Resigned 1941 to enter military service)	Thomas H. Bienz (D)	Dave Sweeny (D)	Spokane County (part)
27th (1941-1942)	Vacant (Note: This seat was vacant until after the 1942 general election.)	Thomas H. Bienz (D)	Dave Sweeny (D)	Spokane County (part)
28th (1943-1944)	Thomas H. Bienz (D)	Fred C. Ashley (R)	Herbert M. Hamblen (R) (Note: Elected Speaker of the House for the 30th legislative session (1947-48))	Spokane County (part)
29th (1945-1946)	Thomas H. Bienz (D)	Fred C. Ashley (R)	Herbert M. Hamblen (R)	Spokane County (part)
30th (1947-1948)	Thomas H. Bienz (D)	Fred C. Ashley (R)	Herbert M. Hamblen (R)	Spokane County (part)
31st (1949-1950)	Roderick A. Lindsay (D)	Robert E. Blair (D)	Carl F. Mohr (D)	Spokane County (part)
32nd (1951-1952)	Roderick A. Lindsay (D)	D. W. Giboney (D)	W. Kenneth Jones (R)	Spokane County (part)
33rd (1953-1954)	Roderick A. Lindsay (D)	Harold Davis (R)	W. Kenneth Jones (R)	Spokane County (part)
34th (1955-1956)	Roderick A. Lindsay (D)	Arthur D. Jones, Jr. (R)	William A. Weitzman (R)	Spokane County (part)
35th (1957-1958)	Karl V. Herrmann (D)	Kathryn Epton (D)	James E. Winton (R)	Spokane County (part)
36th (1959-1960)	Karl V. Herrmann (D)	William S. Day (D) (Note: Elected Speaker of the House for the 38th legislative session (1963-64))	Kathryn Epton (D)	Spokane County (part)
37th (1961-1962)	Karl V. Herrmann (D)	William S. Day (D)	Kathryn Epton (D)	Spokane County (part)
38th (1963-1964)	Karl V. Herrmann (D)	William S. Day (D)	Mike E. Odell (R)	Spokane County (part)
39th (1965-1966)	Karl V. Herrmann (D)	William S. Day (D)	Kathryn Epton (D)	Spokane County (part)
40th (1967-1968)	Karl V. Herrmann (D)	William S. Day (D)	Gordon W. Richardson (R)	1965 Redistricting
40th (1967-1968)	Karl V. Herrmann (D)	William S. Day (D)	Gordon W. Richardson (R)	Spokane County (part)
41st (1969-1970)	William S. Day (D)	James P. Kuehnle (R)	Gordon W. Richardson (R)	Spokane County (part)
42nd (1971-1972)	William S. Day (D)	James P. Kuehnle (R)	Walt O. Knowles (D)	Spokane County (part)
43rd (1973-1974)	William S. Day (D)	James P. Kuehnle (R)	Walt O. Knowles (D)	1972 Redistricting
43rd (1973-1974)	William S. Day (D)	James P. Kuehnle (R)	Walt O. Knowles (D)	Spokane County (part), Whitman County (part)
44th (1975-1976)	William S. Day (D)	James P. Kuehnle (R)	Walt O. Knowles (D)	Spokane County (part), Whitman County (part)
45th (1977-1978)	William S. Day (D)	Jack W. Grier (D)	Walt O. Knowles (D)	Spokane County (part), Whitman County (part)
46th (1979-1980)	William S. Day (D)	Ren Taylor (R)	Walt O. Knowles (D)	Spokane County (part), Whitman County (part)
47th (1981-1982)	Bob McCaslin Sr. (R) (Note: Resigned Jan. 5, 2011)	Ren Taylor (R)	Mike Padden (R) (Note: Resigned Mar. 28, 1995)	Spokane County (part), Whitman County (part)
48th (1983-1984)	Bob McCaslin Sr. (R)	Ren Taylor (R)	Mike Padden (R)	Spokane County (part)
49th (1985-1986)	Bob McCaslin Sr. (R)	Ren Taylor (R)	Mike Padden (R)	Spokane County (part)
50th (1987-1988)	Bob McCaslin Sr. (R)	Ren Taylor (R)	Mike Padden (R)	Spokane County (part)
51st (1989-1990)	Bob McCaslin Sr. (R)	Charles R. Wolfe (R)	Mike Padden (R)	Spokane County (part)
52nd (1991-1992)	Bob McCaslin Sr. (R)	George Orr (D)	Mike Padden (R)	Spokane County (part)
53rd (1993-1994)	Bob McCaslin Sr. (R)	George Orr (D)	Mike Padden (R)	Spokane County (part)
54th (1995-1996)	Bob McCaslin Sr. (R)	Larry Crouse (R)	Mike Padden (R)	Spokane County (part)
54th (1995-1996)	Bob McCaslin Sr. (R)	Larry Crouse (R)	Mark Sterk (R) (Note: Appointed Apr. 11, 1995 to serve unexpired term) (Note: Resigned May 31, 1998)	Spokane County (part)
55th (1997-1998)	Bob McCaslin Sr. (R)	Larry Crouse (R)	Mark Sterk (R)	Spokane County (part)
55th (1997-1998)	Bob McCaslin Sr. (R)	Larry Crouse (R)	Lynn Schindler (R) (Note: Appointed June 1, 1998 to serve unexpired term)	Spokane County (part)
56th (1999-2000)	Bob McCaslin Sr. (R)	Larry Crouse (R)	Lynn Schindler (R)	Spokane County (part)
57th (2001-2002)	Bob McCaslin Sr. (R)	Larry Crouse (R)	Lynn Schindler (R)	Spokane County (part)
58th (2003-2004)	Bob McCaslin Sr. (R)	Larry Crouse (R)	Lynn Schindler (R)	Spokane County (part)
59th (2005-2006)	Bob McCaslin Sr. (R)	Larry Crouse (R)	Lynn Schindler (R)	Spokane County (part)
60th (2007-2008)	Bob McCaslin Sr. (R)	Larry Crouse (R)	Lynn Schindler (R)	Spokane County (part)
61st (2009-2010)	Bob McCaslin Sr. (R)	Larry Crouse (R)	Matt Shea (R)	Spokane County (part)
62nd (2011-2012)	Bob McCaslin Sr. (R)	Larry Crouse (R)	Matt Shea (R)	Spokane County (part)
62nd (2011-2012)	Jeff Baxter (R) (Note: Appointed Feb. 11, 2011)	Larry Crouse (R)	Matt Shea (R)	Spokane County (part)
62nd (2011-2012)	Mike Padden (R) (Note: Elected Nov. 8, 2011. Sworn in Nov. 29, 2011 to serve unexpired term)	Larry Crouse (R)	Matt Shea (R)	Spokane County (part)
63rd (2013-2014)	Mike Padden (R)	Larry Crouse (R)	Matt Shea (R)	Spokane County (part)
63rd (2013-2014)	Mike Padden (R)	Leonard Christian (R) (Note: Appointed Jan. 8, 2014)	Matt Shea (R)	Spokane County (part)
63rd (2013-2014)	Mike Padden (R)	Bob McCaslin Jr. (R) (Note: Elected Nov. 4, 2014; Sworn in Nov. 25, 2014 to serve unexpired term)	Matt Shea (R)	Spokane County (part)
64th (2015-2016)	Mike Padden (R)	Bob McCaslin Jr. (R)	Matt Shea (R)	Spokane County (part)
65th (2017-2018)	Mike Padden (R)	Matt Shea (R)	Bob McCaslin Jr. (R)	Spokane County (part)
66th (2019-2020)	Mike Padden (R)	Matt Shea (R)	Bob McCaslin Jr. (R)	Spokane County (part)
67th (2021-2022)	Mike Padden (R)	Bob McCaslin Jr. (R)	Rob Chase (R)	Spokane County (part)
68th (2023-2024)	Mike Padden (R)	Suzanne Schmidt (R)	Leonard Christian (R)	Spokane County (part)
69th (2025-2026)	Leonard Christian (R)	Suzanne Schmidt (R)	Rob Chase (R)	Spokane County (part)

== Key ==
Democratic (D)
Populist (Pop)
Progressive (Bull Moose) (Prog)
Republican (R)
Silver Republican (SvR)

- P.P. is People's Party which was closely associate with the Populist Party.

== See also ==
- Washington Redistricting Commission
- Washington State Legislature
- Washington State Senate
- Washington House of Representatives
- Washington (state) legislative districts
