= Senator Baxter =

Senator Baxter may refer to:

- Alexander G. Baxter (1859–1934), New York State Senate
- Charles H. Baxter (1841–?), Wisconsin State Senate
- Delos W. Baxter (1857–1918), Illinois State Senate
- Jeff Baxter (politician) (born 1960), Washington State Senate
- Jere Baxter (1852–1904), Tennessee State Senate
- Luther Loren Baxter (1832–1915), Minnesota State Senate
- Percival P. Baxter (1876–1969), Maine State Senate
