= Hillary Pham =

American politician

Member-elect of the Washington House of Representatives from the 4th district
- Assuming office January 2027
- Succeeding: Suzanne Schmidt

Personal details
- Party: Republican

Hillary Pham is an American politician. A member of the Republican Party, she is the member-elect for the 4th district of the Washington House of Representatives.
