= Lynn Schindler =

American politician from Washington

Member of the Washington House of Representatives from the 4th, Position 2 district
- In office June 1, 1998 – January 12, 2009
- Preceded by: Mark Sterk
- Succeeded by: Matt Shea

Personal details
- Born: Ellen Maureen Dunphy; August 18, 1944 Milwaukee, Wisconsin
- Died: December 4, 2018 (aged 74) Spokane Valley, Washington
- Party: Republican
- Spouse: Jim Schindler
- Children: 10
- Education: Marquette University

Ellen Maureen "Lynn" Schindler (August 18, 1944 – December 4, 2018) was an American politician from Washington. Schindler was a Republican member of Washington House of Representatives from District 4 from 1998 to 2009.

== Early life ==
On August 18, 1944, Schindler was born as Ellen Maureen Dunphy in Milwaukee, Wisconsin. Schindler's parents were Ellen and Ward Dunphy.

== Education ==
In 1966, Schindler earned a Bachelor of Arts degree in Communications from Marquette University.

== Career ==
As a businesswoman, Schindler was a co-owner of Schindler Electric Supply Co. Schindler was involved in commercial and investment properties with her husband.

In June 1998, Schindler was appointed as a member of Washington House of Representatives for District 4.

On November 3, 1998, Schindler won the election and continued serving as a Republican member of Washington House of Representatives for District 4, Position 2. Schindler defeated John G. Kallas with 55.83% of the votes.

On November 7, 2000, as an incumbent. Schindler won the election and continued serving Washington House of Representatives for District 4, Position 2. Schindler defeated John G. Kallas with 60.30% of the votes.

On November 5, 2002, as an incumbent. Schindler won the election unopposed and continued serving Washington House of Representatives for District 4, Position 2.

On November 2, 2004, as an incumbent. Schindler won the election and continued serving Washington House of Representatives for District 4, Position 2. Schindler defeated Ed Foote with 65.85% of the votes.

On November 7, 2006, as an incumbent. Schindler won the election and continued serving Washington House of Representatives for District 4, Position 2. Schindler defeated Ed Foote with 65.05% of the votes.

== Personal life ==
Schindler was married to Jim Schindler. They had ten children. In 1995, Schindler's son Patrick died in a car accident. On December 4, 2018, Schindler died in Spokane Valley, Washington. Schindler is interred at St. Michael Cemetery.
