= Robert M. Schaefer =

American politician (1930–2022)

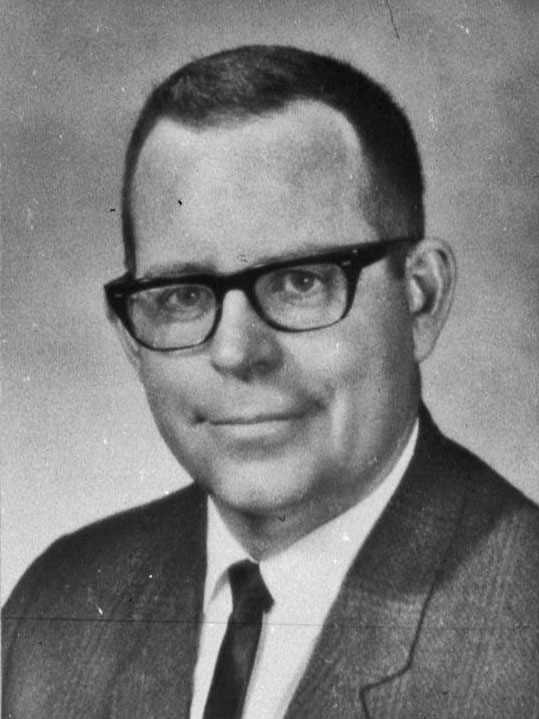
- Schaefer in 1965

33rd Speaker of the Washington House of Representatives
- In office January 11, 1965 – January 9, 1967
- Preceded by: William S. Day
- Succeeded by: Don Eldridge

Member of the Washington House of Representatives for the 49th district
- In office 1959–1967
- Succeeded by: Richard L. Smythe

Personal details
- Born: April 19, 1930 Seattle, Washington, U.S.
- Died: February 27, 2022 (aged 91)
- Party: Democratic

Robert McMaster Schaefer (April 19, 1930 – February 27, 2022) was an American politician and lawyer.

Schaefer born in Seattle, Washington. He grew up in Vancouver, Washington and graduated from Vancouver High School in 1948. Schaefer went to Clark College and received his bachelor's and law degrees from Willamette University. He was admitted to the Washington bar and then served in the United States Army. Schaefer then returned to Clark County, Washington and practiced law in Vancouver. He served in the Washington House of Representatives from 1959 to 1967 and was a Democrat. He was Speaker of the House from 1965 to 1967.
