= Don Eldridge =

American politician

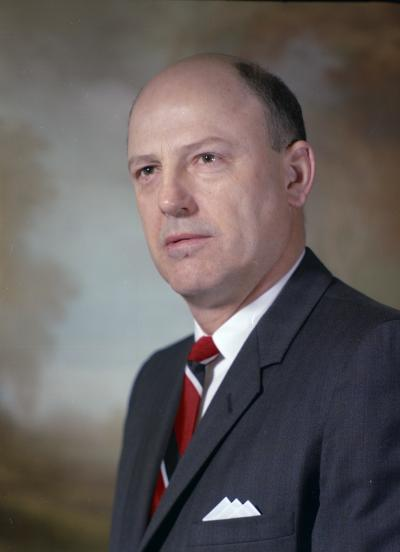
- Eldridge in 1967

34th Speaker of the Washington House of Representatives
- In office January 9, 1967 – March 12, 1970
- Preceded by: Robert M. Schaefer
- Succeeded by: Tom Copeland

Member of the Washington House of Representatives from the 40th district
- In office January 12, 1953 – March 12, 1970
- Preceded by: Emma Abbott Ridgway
- Succeeded by: D. James Costanti

Personal details
- Born: December 26, 1919 Mount Vernon, Washington, U.S.
- Died: October 16, 2007 (aged 87) Olympia, Washington, U.S.
- Party: Republican
- Profession: property manager

Don Delos Eldridge (December 26, 1919 – October 16, 2007) was an American politician.

== Early life and education ==
He was born in Mount Vernon, Washington. He graduated from Mount Vernon High School and Mount Vernon Junior College. While at junior college, he completed the first phase of civilian pilot training in anticipation of joining the United States Army Air Corps. He attended Washington State University for one year and received a degree in education from Western Washington College of Education. He then worked in his family's stationary business and local newspaper in Mount Vernon.

== Career ==
He served in the Washington House of Representatives 1952–1970 as a Republican and was the speaker. In 1970, Eldridge was appointed to the Washington State Liquor Control Board and served until 1979. He was a member of the first Washington Redistricting Commission in 1983. He was in the property management business in Olympia, Washington. He died in Olympia, Washington.
