= State of Liberty =

Proposed state of the United States

Coordinates: 47.0°N 119.0°W

Proposed State of Liberty with Washington Washington Liberty

The State of Liberty is a proposed U.S. state to be formed out of Eastern Washington, as submitted in a failed bill proposal in 2019 by Matt Shea and Bob McCaslin Jr. in the Washington House of Representatives. It was proposed by Shea as House Memorials in 2015 and 2017, and was the subject of the Douglas County Republicans' "Lincoln Day dinner" keynote speech in May 2018 at the Wenatchee Convention Center.

== Proposal ==
Similar proposals to Liberty had been made as early as 1906 when it was suggested to include mergers with parts of Oregon or Idaho. The modern notion of splitting Washington state came about due to the eastern half of Washington being traditionally more Republican and being asserted to be fundamentally different from the Democrat majority west by the proposal's supporters. They had drafted a state constitution and designed a flag for Liberty. Opponents assert that the proposal had no chance of passing either the Washington State Legislature due to the way it is constituted or that it would be approved by the United States Congress.

The bill to create Liberty was often promoted by Shea, proposing a version every year until he was ejected from the Republican caucus in 2019. In early 2021, a bill (House Bill 1239) calling for the creation of a new state called Liberty was proposed by Republicans Rob Chase and Bob McCaslin. The bill was also co-sponsored by Republicans Robert Sutherland and Tom Dent. After 2021, support for the State of Liberty gradually dwindled and ceased to be proposed publicly.

== See also ==
- 51st state
- Cascadia (independence movement)
- Greater Idaho movement
- Jefferson (proposed Pacific state)
- Lincoln (proposed Northwestern state)
