= Kathryn Epton =

American politician

Member of the Washington House of Representatives from the 4th district
- In office 1957–1963
- In office 1965–1967

Personal details
- Born: January 12, 1912 Garwood, Idaho
- Died: November 12, 1998 (aged 86) Spokane, Washington
- Party: Democratic
- Education: Washington State University; Holy Names College; University of Arizona; Gonzaga University

Kathryn (Kay) Epton (January 12, 1912 – November 12, 1998) was an American politician. She was a Democrat, and represented District 4 in the Washington House of Representatives, from 1957 to 1963, and 1965 to 1967. She promoted the creation of community developmental centers through the Epton Center Act.
