= Richard A. Hutchinson =

American politician

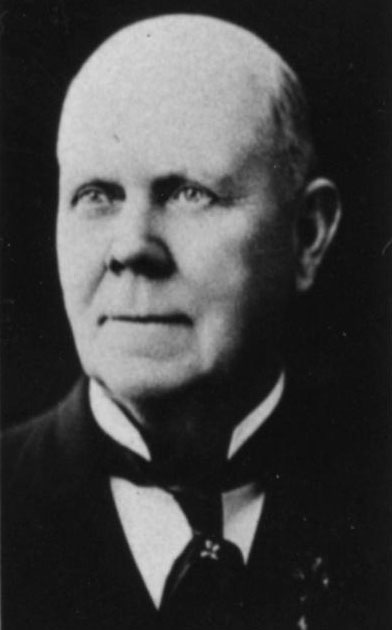
- Hutchinson in 1919

Member of the Washington House of Representatives
- In office January 7, 1891 – January 9, 1893 (15th district); January 14, 1907 – January 11, 1909 (3rd district)

Member of the Washington State Senate
- In office January 9, 1893 – January 11, 1897 (1st district); January 11, 1909 – January 10, 1921 (4th district)

Personal details
- Born: February 14, 1853 Grand Gulf, Mississippi, United States
- Died: July 19, 1921 (aged 68) Spokane, Washington, United States
- Party: Republican

Richard A. Hutchinson (February 14, 1853 – July 19, 1921) was an American politician in the state of Washington. He served in the Washington House of Representatives and Washington State Senate.
