= Sverre N. Omdahl =

Sverre N. Omdahl (died 1970 at the age of 61) was an agriculture official and state legislator in Washington State. He served as the state's director of agriculture.

He served in the Washington House of Representatives in 1948. He was succeeded by Emma Ridgway in 1949.

He was a candidate for a state senate seat in 1948. He served on Governor Arthur B. Langlie's staff.
