= Richard L. Smythe =

American politician

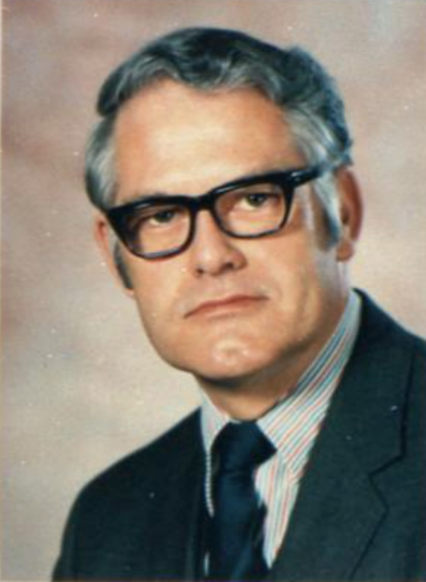
- Smythe in 1971

Member of the Washington House of Representatives from the 49th district
- In office 1967–1973
- Preceded by: Robert M. Schaefer
- Succeeded by: Richard N. Kishimoto

Personal details
- Born: March 10, 1926 Tacoma, Washington, U.S.
- Died: October 23, 1999 (aged 73)
- Party: Republican
- Education: Nebraska Wesleyan University

Richard L. Smythe (March 10, 1926 – October 23, 1999) was an American politician. He served as a Republican member for the 49th district of the Washington House of Representatives.

== Life and career ==
Smythe was born in Tacoma, Washington. He attended Nebraska Wesleyan University.

Smythe served in the Washington House of Representatives from 1967 to 1973.

Smythe died of a heart attack on October 23, 1999, at the age of 73.
