= William S. Day =

American politician (1923–1984)

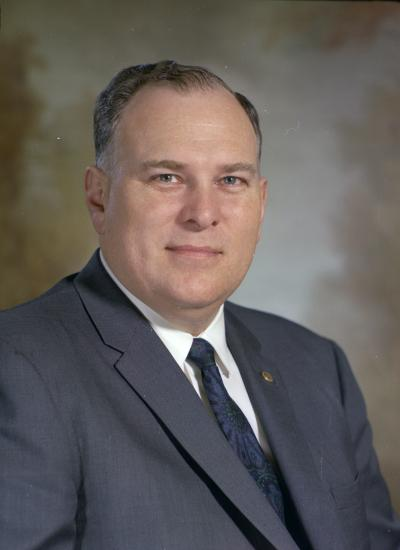
- Day in 1967

32nd Speaker of the Washington House of Representatives
- In office January 14, 1963 – January 11, 1965
- Preceded by: John L. O'Brien
- Succeeded by: Robert M. Schaefer

Member of the Washington Senate from the 4th district
- In office January 13, 1969 – January 12, 1981
- Preceded by: Karl V. Herrmann
- Succeeded by: Bob McCaslin Sr.

Member of the Washington House of Representatives from the 4th district
- In office January 12, 1959 – January 13, 1969
- Preceded by: Mrs. John W. Epton (Kathryn)
- Succeeded by: James P. Kuehnle

Personal details
- Born: William Scott Day; January 31, 1923 Rockford, Illinois, U.S.
- Died: May 27, 1984 (aged 61) Spokane, Washington, U.S.
- Party: Democratic

William Scott Day (January 31, 1923 – May 27, 1984) was an American politician in the state of Washington. He served in the Washington House of Representatives from 1959 to 1969 and in the Senate from 1969 to 1981. He was Speaker of the House from 1963 to 1965.
