= Senator Pearce (disambiguation) =

James Pearce (1805–1862) was a U.S. Senator from Maryland from 1843 to 1862. Senator Pearce may also refer to:

- Bill Pearce (politician) (1894–1968), Florida State Senate
- Charles H. Pearce (1817–1887), Florida State Senate
- David Pearce (politician) (born 1960), Missouri State Senate
- Drue Pearce (born 1951), Alaska State Senate
- Monty Pearce (born 1948), Idaho State Senate
- Russell Pearce (born 1947), Arizona State Senate

== See also ==
- Senator Peirce (disambiguation)
- Senator Pierce (disambiguation)
