= Lincoln (proposed Northwestern state) =

Proposed U.S. northwestern state

Proposed location of the State of Lincoln.

Lincoln is the name for several proposals to create a new state in the Northwest United States. The proposed State has been defined in multiple ways, but can generally be said to be coterminous with the region known as the Inland Northwest. The proposed state was named in honor of Abraham Lincoln, who was president of Union during the American Civil War and led it to victory against Confederates. His name had also been proposed for the states that were eventually named North Dakota and Wyoming.

== Lincoln in the Northwest ==
The State of Lincoln has been proposed to consist of the Panhandle of Idaho and Eastern Washington (that is, east of the Cascade Mountains). Other than Lincoln, the names "Columbia" and "Eastern (or East) Washington" were proposed to be used for the state. It was first proposed by Idaho in 1865, when the capital was moved from Lewiston in December 1864 to its present-day location of Boise in January 1865, in an Idaho greatly reduced in land area. The original Idaho Territory, from a bill signed by President Lincoln in March 1863, was declared by Governor William H. Wallace in Lewiston, July 4, 1863, and included present-day Idaho, and virtually all of present-day Montana and Wyoming, making it larger in land area than Texas.

Montana was made a territory in May 1864 and the Panhandle was specifically excluded in order to prevent Lewiston, west of both the Continental Divide along the crest of the Rockies and of the Bitterroot Range, from remaining the capital. The reasoning was that Lewiston sits on the western edge, across the Snake River from Washington, whereas Montana stretches to North Dakota.

In the mid and late 1860s, there was a proposal centered on Lewiston in northern Idaho for a Columbia Territory to be formed in the Inland Northwest from parts of what is now eastern Washington, northern Idaho and western Montana. In 1901 another proposal was made, this time to combine the Idaho Panhandle with Eastern Washington to create the state of Lincoln. A third proposal was popularized in the late 1920s to consist of eastern Washington, northern Idaho and western Montana to the Continental Divide. From the Washington end, proposals have been made as recently as 1996, 1999 and 2005. Idaho saw a corresponding campaign for North Idaho, financed by the sale of T-shirts reading "North Idaho – A State of Mind".

== Areas proposed for inclusion ==
=== North Idaho ===
While the disconnection between Western Washington and Eastern Washington is well known and documented, North Idaho has a similar dynamic in which its residents often feel disconnected from the state's political center in Boise. The Idaho Panhandle is most often considered to be the ten northernmost counties in the state—Boundary, Bonner, Benewah, Clearwater, Idaho, Kootenai, Latah, Lewis, Nez Perce, and Shoshone. These counties are separated from Southern Idaho by the Salmon River and observe Pacific Time, unlike the rest of the state, which uses Mountain Time.

Parallel suggestions of a "State of Kootenai" have been made, referring to a proposed union of the six northernmost counties of Idaho, and the six westernmost counties of Montana, creating a geographically, politically, and ecologically connected state of 524,888 residents, putting it ahead of other states such as Wyoming.

=== Eastern Washington and eastern Oregon ===
Other conceptions of a potential "State of Lincoln" have been rendered, specifically a possible combination of eastern Washington and eastern Oregon.

The people of Eastern Oregon also often express the same frustration with being coupled with Portland and the region west of the Cascades that Eastern Washingtonians do with respect to Seattle. This proposed coupling would create one of the largest states by area in the country, stretching all the way from the eastern foothills of the Cascade Mountain Range to the border with Idaho in the east.

== Proposals ==
The state legislatures for Idaho and Washington have seen bills proposing secession or splintering. Idaho would not go along as at the time the Panhandle generated more tax revenue per capita than the south. If combined with the proposed State of Jefferson, which overlaps a proposed Oregon-Washington "State of Lincoln" in southeastern Oregon and is proposed for many of the same reasons, it would create a state that is even larger.

The Inland Northwest region roughly corresponds to the area that might comprise such a State of Lincoln. The largest city would be Spokane, Washington, which is presently Washington's second largest and the greater Spokane area is the third largest population base in the northwestern US behind Seattle and Portland.

A Spokane proposal in 1907 called for a new state "Lincoln" to be created from eastern Washington, northeastern Oregon, and northern Idaho. Oregon and Washington's eastern boundary would have been shifted westward to 120° W, aligning with California's eastern boundary. Idaho's northern boundary would have been shifted southward to 45° N, aligning with Wyoming's northern boundary.

== Alternative name for current states ==
=== North Dakota ===
It was proposed to split Dakota Territory into northern and southern halves while being considered for statehood in the 1880s. Republicans in the Senate suggested the name "Lincoln" for the northern half, despite objections from residents from the territory, which drew strong objection from the Democrats. Ultimately the territory was admitted in 1889 as two states, North Dakota and South Dakota.

=== Wyoming ===
When the 1868 bill to form Wyoming Territory was first discussed in the U.S. Senate, an amendment was proposed that would have changed its name to Lincoln Territory after the assassinated U.S. president Abraham Lincoln. The new name was supported by the Senate Committee on Territories, however it started a debate that scrutinized both "Lincoln" and "Wyoming", with several members preferring local and Indian names. Multiple senators objected to naming a territory after a single man, acknowledging Washington Territory (named in 1853 for George Washington) as the sole exception. "Wyoming" was the simple English transliteration of the Lenape Indian tribe's word for "large plains", which was considered descriptive of the land but undesirable due to its distant origin in Pennsylvania. The bill eventually passed both houses of Congress with the name "Wyoming Territory", and the Wyoming name was retained when statehood was achieved in 1890.

== See also ==
- Secession in the United States
- Greater Idaho movement
- Jefferson (proposed Pacific state)
- Jefferson (proposed Southern state)
- Lincoln (proposed Southern state)
- State of Liberty
- 51st state
