= Jeff Baxter (politician) =

American politician

Member of the Washington Senate from the 4th district
- In office February 11, 2011 – November 29, 2011
- Preceded by: Bob McCaslin Sr.
- Succeeded by: Mike Padden

Personal details
- Born: Jeffrey H. Baxter; September 19, 1960 (age 65) Yakima, Washington, U.S.
- Party: Republican
- Spouse: Diane R. Baxter
- Children: 2
- Education: Shorecrest High School
- Profession: Collection agency employee Financial services small businessman

Military service
- Branch/service: United States Air Force
- Years of service: 1980 – 1984 (4 years)

Jeffrey H. "Jeff" Baxter (born September 19, 1960) is a former American businessman and politician of the Republican Party. Baxter represented Washington's 4th Legislative District in the Washington State Senate for less than 10 months during 2011. Despite being the second choice of the Republican Precinct Committee Officers to current State Representative Matt Shea, he was appointed in February 2011 to fill the vacancy following Senator Bob McCaslin, Sr.'s resignation due to health difficulties. Baxter was ultimately defeated in a special election in November 2011 to former State Representative and Spokane County District Court Judge Mike Padden by nearly 10 points.
