= Mike Padden =

American lawyer and politician (born 1946)

- Padden in 2011

Member of the Washington Senate from the 4th district
- In office November 29, 2011 – January 13, 2025
- Preceded by: Jeff Baxter
- Succeeded by: Leonard Christian

Spokane County District Court Judge, Position 3
- In office March 23, 1995 – January 8, 2007
- Preceded by: Raymond Tanksley Jr.
- Succeeded by: John O. Cooney

Member of the Washington House of Representatives from the 4th district
- In office January 12, 1981 – March 28, 1995
- Preceded by: Walt O. Knowles
- Succeeded by: Mark Sterk

Personal details
- Born: Michael John Padden; November 13, 1946 (age 80) Portland, Oregon
- Party: Republican
- Spouse: Laura Joanna (Derr) Padden
- Children: 5
- Education: Gonzaga University (BA, JD)
- Profession: City Attorney; State Representative; County District Court Judge; State Senator

Michael John Padden (born November 13, 1946) is an American retired judge and politician from Spokane Valley, Washington. He was previously a member of the Washington State Senate representing Washington's 4th Legislative District and a District Court judge for Spokane County.

Padden is most well known as the "faithless elector", a presidential elector who casts his vote for someone other than for whom he has pledged to vote. During the 1976 United States presidential election, he served as a Republican presidential elector for Washington. Though incumbent President Gerald Ford won Washington, Padden made headlines by casting his electoral vote for Ronald Reagan.

== Early life and education ==
Padden was born on November 13, 1946 in Portland, Oregon to Martha Alice Padden (née Merle) and Richard Michael "Mike" Padden as the eldest of seven children. His mother was an Oregon native who worked in the shipyards during World War II before meeting his father, a Naval officer, originally from Ohio. Because his father worked for U.S. Steel, the family relocated frequently during Padden's early childhood, moving between Seattle, Pittsburgh, Buffalo, and Chicago before settling back in Washington. Padden spent his formative years in Seattle, where he grew up on Hawthorn Hills, across the street from Governor Daniel J. Evans' home, and graduated from Seattle Preparatory School.

Padden was raised in a deeply devout Irish Catholic household, which shaped his life and values. His father was known to be guided by a strong Catholic faith throughout his life and was a dedicated financial supporter of various religious organizations. His mother was also highly devout, finding deep sustenance in the church and making a habit of walking to daily Mass. This childhood environment laid the foundation for his own lifelong religious involvement, which later included serving on his local parish council and joining the Knights of Columbus.

Following high school, Padden moved across the state to Spokane to attend Gonzaga University. He earned a Bachelor of Arts degree in 1971. He remained at Gonzaga for his graduate studies, earning a Juris Doctor from the Gonzaga University School of Law in 1974.

He chaired the local Gonzaga College Republicans chapter and maintained a staunch rivalry against Washington State University College Republicans chair and future Washington Secretary of State Sam Reed. Reed, a secular, moderate Republican, clashed with Padden's staunch conservative positions. The two would compete for ideological influence over the College Republicans in the state from their respective cliques, foreshadowing the eventual moderate versus conservative factionalism that haunted the Republicans in the following decades.

During his early adulthood, Padden also served in the United States Army Reserves, where he attained the rank of E-5.

== Career ==
By the mid-1970s, Padden was working as an attorney in Spokane. Outside of his legal work, he was rapidly becoming a highly active member of the Spokane County Republican Party. Following the Supreme Court's 1973 Roe v. Wade decision, Padden became deeply involved with the pro-life movement and conservative political organizing.

=== Faithless elector ===
Padden's first prominent foray into the national political spotlight occurred shortly after he finished law school. Throughout the 1976 Republican Party presidential primaries, he was highly active in Ronald Reagan's campaign in Spokane County, backing Reagan's insurgent challenge against incumbent President Gerald Ford. He was a Reagan delegate to the state convention, held that year in Spokane and hoped to go to the Republican National Convention in Kansas City. However, Padden didn’t have the estimated $3,000 a national delegate would spend to attend, so after a suggestion, he instead decided to run to be an elector.

President Gerald Ford later won Washington despite losing the general election to Democrat Jimmy Carter. Rather than vote for President Ford, Padden instead cast his vote for Ronald Reagan, making headlines across the country. Padden ultimately chose to cast his vote against Ford due to his pro-choice stance on abortion, with the Roe v. Wade decision happening just some three years earlier. This infuriated local party leadership, with Spokane County GOP chair Dr. Homer Cunningham later decrying "Well, that's it, Padden. You'll never get elected to anything after that."

In response to Padden's actions, the Washington State Legislature passed a law the following year instituting a civil penalty for any future faithless electors who refused to vote for their pledged candidate.

=== Washington State House ===
Despite the local party chair's dire prediction, Padden’s bold move cemented his reputation among the region's rising conservative base. Four years after the elector incident, Padden capitalized on his local profile to run for the Washington State House of Representatives, in the 4th legislative district, centered in Spokane Valley, against longtime incumbent Democrat Walt O. Knowles, the Majority Whip in the State House. Padden cited his motivation for running being O. Knowle's pro-choice stance. A couple months after Padden announced, Knowles withdrew from the race and endorsed Dennis Dellwo to succeed him.

Padden won his election in 1980, in what the most expensive State House race of that year. After entering the legislature in January 1981, he quickly became known as the only Republican practicing lawyer in the House at the time. He later served as House Majority Floor Leader and Chair of the Law and Justice Committee.

=== District Court Judge ===
In March 1995, Padden resigned from his position in the legislature when he was appointed as a judge for the Spokane County District Court. He went on to win three additional terms in countywide elections. Respected by his peers on the bench, his fellow judges elected him twice to serve as the court's presiding judge, a role where he managed a $7.8 million budget and a staff of 150 employees. He retired from the bench in January 2007.

=== NHTSA ===
Following his retirement from the local court, Padden was appointed in 2008 to serve with the National Highway Traffic Safety Administration. In this role as a Judicial Outreach Liaison, he oversaw therapeutic traffic safety issues, such as DUI courts and repeat offender programs—across a five-state region that included Washington, Idaho, Montana, Oregon, and Alaska.

=== Washington State Senate ===
A campaign sign from Padden's 2011 race for State Senate

The 4th legislative district's State Senate seat had been held by Bob McCaslin Sr. since 1981,a the same year Padden first took office as a state representative. After 30 years in office, McCaslin resigned in January of 2011 due to severe health complications following heart surgery, later passing away in March. Per Washington State law, the Spokane County Board of Commissioners appointed Jeff Baxter, a local financial services small businessman and Air Force veteran to fill the seat. Padden, who was off the bench and working as a judicial outreach liaison at the time, decided to challenge the newly appointed incumbent in the special election, required by Washington State law to be held that same year.

Padden defeated Baxter by nearly a 10-point margin. He was officially sworn into the Washington State Senate on November 29, 2011, and he went on to hold the seat until his retirement in January 2025.

Because of his extensive background as an attorney and former District Court judge, he became a central figure on the Senate Law and Justice Committee. From 2013 to 2017, when a Republican-led coalition held the Senate majority, Padden served as the committee's Chair. When Democrats regained control, he transitioned to the role of Ranking Member. He also consistently served on the Senate Transportation Committee and the Health and Long-Term Care Committee.

==== Key legislative achievements ====
Drawing directly on his time as a judge and a liaison for the National Highway Traffic Safety Administration, Padden was a relentless advocate for tightening Washington's DUI laws. He frequently sponsored and supported legislation to increase penalties for repeat drunk drivers. Most notably, he led continuous, multi-year efforts to make a fourth DUI conviction be considered a felony in Washington State and pushed legislation to extend the "lookback period," the window of time in which previous DUIs are counted against a defendant to trigger felony charges, from 10 to 15 years.

One of Padden's most significant bipartisan achievements was his sponsorship of Senate Bill 5096. The bill created the Washington Employee Ownership Program and the Employee Ownership Commission to provide technical assistance, financial support, and tax credits to businesses looking to transition into Employee Stock Ownership Plans (ESOPs) or worker cooperatives.

Padden maintained a voting record as the most conservative senator, with a 100% rating from the American Conservative Union. He was a steadfast pro-life advocate, supported strict protections for Second Amendment rights, consistently fought against tax increases, and opposed state-mandated social policies. He frequently championed bills aimed at regulatory relief for small businesses, protecting religious liberties, and strengthening government transparency and public records access. He chaired the State Senate Freedom Caucus along with Senators Doug Ericksen, Phil Fortunato and Jim McCune.

=== Other activities ===
After retiring from the Washington State Senate, he helped lead Congressman Michael Baumgartner's campaign team for his initial 2024 bid and currently serves as a Senior Policy Advisor, frequently working at the Spokane Valley office. His wife Laura Padden currently serves as Mayor of Spokane Valley.

== Personal life ==
Mike and Laura Padden with their grand daughter

Padden volunteering for Meals on Wheels in 2011

Mike Padden introducing U.S. Representative Cathy McMorris Rodgers prior to her throwing out the first pitch

Padden permanently settled in Spokane Valley in 1978. He married his wife, Laura Derr, and the couple raised five children together. Padden became deeply embedded in the local Spokane community through numerous civic and religious organizations. An active member of the Catholic faith, he served on his parish council and has been a long-time member of the Knights of Columbus. His volunteer work has also extended to Greater Spokane Meals on Wheels, Parents for Safe Schools, and serving as a state commissioner and past Spokane chapter president for American Legion Baseball.
