= Emma Ridgway =

Washington State politician

Member of the Washington House of Representatives from the 40th district
- In office January 10, 1949 – January 14, 1957 Serving with Violet P. Boede (1949–51); Grant C. Sisson (1949–53); James T. Ovenell (1951-57); Don Eldridge (1953–57)
- Preceded by: Sverre N. Omdahl; Ed M. Schwarz; Grant C. Sisson
- Succeeded by: Don Eldridge; James T. Ovenell; Ralph L. Rickdall
- In office January 8, 1945 – January 13, 1947 Serving with Violet P. Boede; Fred J. Martin
- Preceded by: Violet P. Boede; Fred J. Martin; Grant C. Sisson
- Succeeded by: Sverre N. Omdahl; Ed M. Schwarz; Grant C. Sisson

Personal details
- Born: July 21, 1903 Seattle, Washington, U.S.
- Died: May 1, 1981 (aged 77) Sedro-Woolley, Washington, U.S.
- Party: Democratic
- Spouse: Dr. Ralph (Hubert?) Ridgway
- Education: Washington State College (now Washington State University) (B.A.); Columbia University (M.A.)
- Occupation: Movie theater owner/manager

Emma Abbott Ridgway (1903 – 1981) was an American politician who served as a member of the Washington House of Representatives for five terms, from 1945 to 1947 and from 1949 to 1957. She represented Washington's 40th legislative district as a Democrat. She served on a number of legislative committees over her five terms, chairing the educational institutions committee in the 1945 term. In party leadership, she was vice chair of the state Democratic Central Committee from 1936 to 1946, state chair of the Democratic Women's Division, and served as a delegate to the Democratic National Conventions of 1944 and 1948.

Outside the legislature, she was affiliated with Alpha Chi Omega, the American Legion Auxiliary, the P.E.O. Sisterhood, the Phi Kappa Phi and Pi Lambda Theta honor societies, and the Sedro-Woolley Soroptomist Club. She was manager of the Washington State Building at the 1939 New York World's Fair.
