= Senator Pierce =

Senator Pierce may refer to:

== Members of the United States Senate ==
- Franklin Pierce (1804–1869), U.S. Senator from New Hampshire from 1837 to 1842
- Gilbert A. Pierce (1838–1901), U.S. Senator from North Dakota from 1889 to 1891

== United States state senate member ==
- Bobby Pierce (politician) (fl. 2000s–2010s), Arkansas State Senate
- C. A. Pierce (died 1954), Arizona State Senate
- David Pierce (politician) (fl. 2000s–2010s), New Hampshire State Senate
- Edward C. Pierce (1930–2002), Michigan State Senate
- George H. Pierce (1872–1967), New York State Senate
- George T. Pierce (1820s–1874), New York State Senate
- James F. Pierce (1830–1905), New York State Senate
- Josiah Pierce (1792–1866), Maine State Senate
- Loren R. Pierce (1878–1961), Vermont State Senate
- Steve Pierce (born 1950), Arizona State Senate
- Teresa Pierce (fl. 2010s–present), Maine State Senate
- Walter M. Pierce (1861–1954), Oregon State Senate

== See also ==
- William A. Pirce (1824–1891), Rhode Island State Senate
- Senator Pearce (disambiguation)
- Senator Peirce (disambiguation)
