= Matt Shea =

American politician (born 1974)

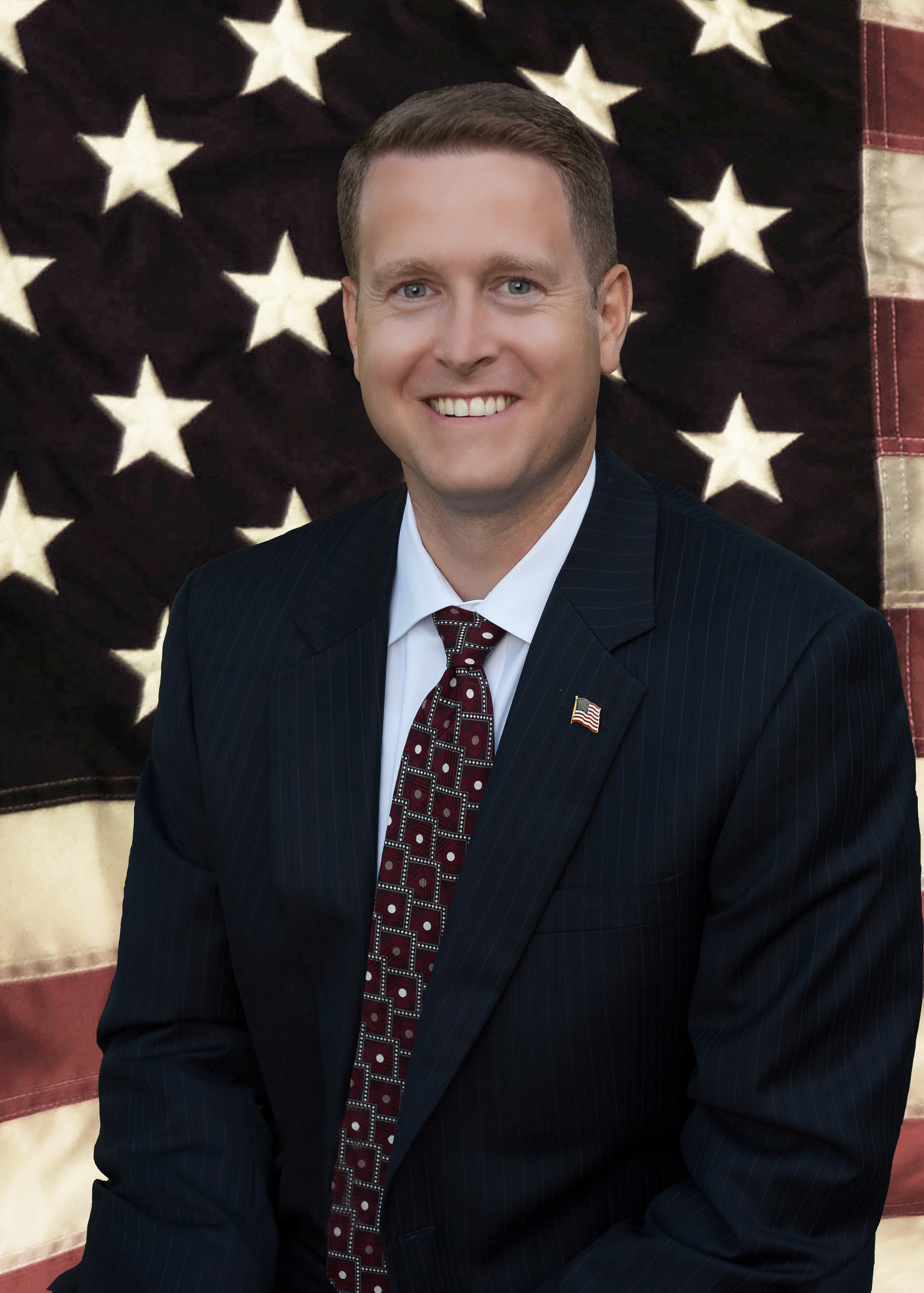
- Shea in 2012

Member of the Washington House of Representatives from the 4th district
- In office January 12, 2009 – January 11, 2021
- Preceded by: Lynn Schindler
- Succeeded by: Bob McCaslin Jr.

Personal details
- Born: Matthew Thomas Shea; April 18, 1974 (age 52) Spokane, Washington, U.S.
- Party: Republican
- Spouses: Viktoriya Vinnikova (m. 2008) Lisa Jenn (m. 2002; div. 2008)
- Education: Gonzaga University (BA, JD)
- Occupation: Lawyer, pastor, politician
- Website: Official (archive)

Military service
- Allegiance: United States
- Branch/service: United States Army; Washington Army National Guard
- Years of service: 1996–2000; 2001–2006
- Rank: Captain
- Battles/wars: Iraq War

Matthew Thomas Shea (born April 18, 1974) is an American conservative lawyer, pastor, and politician. A Republican, he represented the 4th legislative district in the Washington House of Representatives from 2009 to 2021. A 2019 report published by the Washington House of Representatives accused Shea of domestic terrorism in relation to his role in a series of standoffs with federal authorities.

In October 2018, Shea acknowledged that he had distributed a four-page manifesto which called for the killing of non-Christian males if a war were to occur and they do not agree to follow fundamentalist biblical law. Shea was referred to the Federal Bureau of Investigation for investigation as a result. In April 2019, Shea was removed as State House Republican Caucus Chair for advocating violence against religious minorities and offering state surveillance of political enemies to members of hate groups.

An investigative report commissioned by the House, issued on December 1, 2019, found that Shea "participated in an act of domestic terrorism against the United States", organized and supported "three armed conflicts of political violence", and advocated turning the United States itself into a theocracy and "the killing of all males who do not agree." A former ally of Shea provided documents showing that Shea and his supporters were planning to seize control of the region after the outbreak of civil war, installing Shea as governmental leader in order to institute "constitutional changes" to "sanctify to Jesus Christ". Immediately after the report was issued, Shea was removed from the House Republican Caucus, though he refused to resign.

== Early life, education, and legal career ==
Shea graduated from high school in Bellingham, Washington. He received a bachelor's degree from Gonzaga University in 1996 and a J.D. degree from Gonzaga University School of Law in 2006. Shea worked for seven years at M. Casey Law in Spokane as an attorney before opening a solo practice in 2020 specializing in nonprofit, civil rights and personal injury law.

== Military service ==
Shea was in the Army ROTC program at Gonzaga University. In 1996, he entered the U.S. Army as a second Lieutenant. He was deployed to Bosnia-Herzegovina, Iraq, and Kuwait, and left the Washington Army National Guard in 2006 with the rank of Captain.

Shea received the Bronze Star for service during Operation Iraqi Freedom II. He received the Meritorious Service medal for serving as Commander of HHC, 1-161 IN BM in support of Operation Iraqi Freedom II.

== Political career ==
Shea was first elected to the Washington House of Representatives in 2008, representing the 4th Legislative District, part of Spokane County. He was re-elected four times, in 2012, 2014, 2016, and 2018.

Shea endorsed Jim Walsh in his legislative district 19 race in 2016. Walsh was elected and went on to become the chair of the Washington GOP.

Shea hosts Patriot Radio, a twice-weekly show broadcast on the American Christian Network.

Shea was a co-founder and director of the Washington Family Foundation, a socially conservative advocacy group. He was also a board member of the anti-same-sex marriage group Protect Marriage Washington, and during his first term in office introduced legislation seeking to block the recognition of same-sex marriage in Washington.

Shea is a founding member and current chairman of the Coalition of Western States (COWS). In an interview, Shea stated that COWS's goals are to "facilitate the transfer of public lands back to the state level, and to have the states and counties manage the land". During the 2016 occupation of the Malheur National Wildlife Refuge, Shea and other COWS members traveled to Burns, Oregon, allegedly attempting to negotiate on behalf of the militants occupying the reserve. In 2015, Shea supported Idaho Representative Heather Scott, a fellow COWS member, in a protest near the home of John Arnold. Arnold had received a letter from the Department of Veterans Affairs stating the VA had found him mentally incompetent, and protesters worried that his right to own firearms may have been impacted by the VA's findings.

Shea organized the Spokane chapter of ACT! for America, an anti-Muslim organization designated as a hate group by the Southern Poverty Law Center.

As a state legislator, Shea introduced House Memorials in 2015 and 2017 to create a new State of Liberty from Eastern Washington.

Shea did not file for re-election in 2020. He would have faced former Republican State Representative Leonard Christian and Nurse practitioner Lori Feagan, a Democrat, in the election.

== Pastorate ==
In June 2020, Shea was announced as the next pastor of Covenant Christian Church in Spokane, replacing current pastor Ken Peters. Peters, who will be relocating to Knoxville, Tennessee to start a new church, described the change as "God moving generals around".

In May 2021, Shea resigned from Covenant Christian Church and started his own congregation called On Fire Ministries & Kingdom Christian Academy where he is listed as Senior Pastor. When asked, Peters said "We let Matt go. We felt he was better on his own. It wasn't a good fit, long-term."

== Controversies ==
In 2011, as part of the process to replace Washington State Senator Bob McCaslin, background information about Shea included allegations of angry outbursts at Shea's legislative office and that he was disarmed by a commander while he served in Iraq due to anger management issues. Despite Shea being endorsed by the Executive Board of Spokane County's Republican Party, the county commissioners selected businessman Jeff Baxter.

Differences in views between Shea and Spokane County Sheriff Ozzie Knezovich, also a Republican, resulted in Shea contending that "the Southern Poverty Law Center—and the sheriff (Knezovich) that backs them—is the most dangerous organization in this country".

Shea has often clashed with journalists, referring to reporters as "dirty, godless, hateful people" at an August 2018 gun-rights rally. He refers to local newspapers as the "Socialist-Review" (Spokesman-Review) and the "Inslander" (Inlander), the latter referring to Jay Inslee. Shea's contentious history with the press attracted attention because he was, as of August 2018, one of eight state legislators on a Washington Legislature task force dealing with state public records laws and exemptions to them.

=== "Biblical Basis for War" manifesto ===
In late October 2018, Shea acknowledged that he had distributed a document described as a "four-page manifesto" titled Biblical Basis for War that listed strategies that a "Holy Army" could employ. The document, consisting of 14 sections divided into bullet points, had a section on "rules of war" that stated "make an offer of peace before declaring war", which within stated that the enemy must "surrender on terms" of no abortions, no same-sex marriage, no communism and "must obey Biblical law", then continued: "If they do not yield — kill all males". The manifesto also claims the United States is a Christian nation and advocates for the U.S. to become a theocratic republic. Shea acknowledged the document and claimed that it was a summary of "biblical sermons on war."

The Spokesman-Review reported: "After the document was leaked online Tuesday [10/23/18], the Spokane Valley Republican insisted he was not promoting violence and that the message had been taken out of context. 'First of all, it was a summary of a series of sermons on biblical war in the Old Testament as part of a larger discussion on the history of warfare.' Shea said in a Facebook Live video. 'This document, in and of itself, was not a secret. I've actually talked about portions of this document publicly.'"

Sheriff Knezovich alerted the FBI to the manifesto and said that the statements made in the manifesto are consistent with a racist, anti-Semitic, and white supremacist ideology known as Christian Identity, which seeks to establish a "white homeland" in the US northwest.

=== Violent right-wing chat group ===
In April 2019, The Guardian published records from a right-wing chat group of four people that Shea participated in, where Shea used an alias of 'True Warrior' in Latin. Other members in the chat group discussed carrying out surveillance, intimidation, and violent attacks on political enemies, including Antifa activists and "communists." Shea himself volunteered to conduct background checks on residents of Spokane, resulting in Shea naming three individuals. One of the chat group's members forwarded the information to The Guardian, while another confirmed the existence of the chats and acknowledged the discussion on conducting surveillance on "Antifa" people. The Guardian published a second set of emails in August that tied Shea to an organization called Team Rugged, which aimed to train young men for "biblical warfare".

=== Political violence ===
An investigation commissioned by Washington House of Representatives reported, on December 1, 2019, that Shea had planned and participated in domestic terrorism on at least three occasions. This included his participation, organizing, planning, and promotion of the 2014 Bundy standoff in Nevada, the 2015 armed standoff in Priest River, Idaho, and the 2016 armed seizure of the Malheur National Wildlife Refuge in Harney County, Oregon. Shea led a delegation of right-wing legislators from Oregon, Washington and Idaho that met with law enforcement on January 9, 2016, in Burns, Oregon and were appraised of confidential intended law enforcement strategies for dealing with the refuge occupiers. Shea then disclosed those details to Bundy, according to the report.

House leadership forwarded the report to the United States Attorney for the Eastern District of Washington and the FBI. Sheriff Knezovich stated that he believed there was enough evidence "to charge Shea with domestic terrorism, if not treason." The sheriff also stated that he was worried that arresting Shea would lead to an armed standoff, and that he had contacted the Federal Bureau of Investigation regarding this concern. Shea issued a statement to local news station KREM saying he had "been denied any opportunity to review and respond to its results which are still unknown to me." That day, he wrote in a Facebook post: "Like we are seeing with our President this is a sham investigation meant to silence those of us who stand up against attempts to disarm and destroy our great country. I will not back down, I will not give in, I will not resign."

Shea was stripped of committees and suspended from having any role in the House Republican caucus. House Republican leader J.T. Wilcox called on him to resign.

On January 9, 2020, Washington Governor Jay Inslee called on Shea to resign. "The people of Spokane deserve better", Inslee said.

=== Oil on Washington State Capitol steps ===
In May 2020, Shea was fined $4,761.34 for damaging historic masonry by intentionally leaving a trail of slick olive oil on the steps of the Capitol. According to a Department of Enterprise Services report, the oil stain was about 100 feet long. The incident occurred on March 6, 2020, which was the same day as a demonstration by the Satanic Temple of Washington, and Shea stated he needed to clean the ground after the Satanic ritual. According to the leader of The Satanic Temple Lucien Greaves, "If Mr. Shea is so offended by our First Amendment guarantees that he finds it impossible to accept public religious expression that does not align with his own, then I hope the people of Washington will demand his immediate resignation." Hemant Mehta agrees with Greaves and adds "If he cared about Washington more than himself, he would have resigned a long time ago. It's not too late."

=== North Idaho speech ===
At an event in North Idaho less than a month after the 2021 storming of the United States Capitol, Shea called for his followers to prepare for "total war" against their enemies, claimed the election was stolen from Donald Trump, and identified a wide range of threats he perceived (including Islam, antifa, the US Government, and China).

=== Ukrainian children ===
In March 2022, Shea was in Poland, attempting to facilitate the adoption of 62 Ukrainian refugee children, via a Texas-based hosting organization called Loving Families and Homes for Orphans

=== Road rage ===
In November 2011, Shea "pulled a gun during a confrontation with another motorist" in what police reports described as an incident of road rage. Shea was initially charged with possessing a loaded handgun in a vehicle without a concealed weapons permit; the charge was ultimately resolved under a "stipulated order of continuance," in which "Shea paid a $75 fee and agreed that the information in the police report is correct" and the charge was dismissed after the passage of one year with no criminal violations.

=== Spokane Mayor ===
In September 2023 Spokane Mayor Nadine Woodward was denounced by the Spokane City Council for her August 2023 stage appearance with Matt Shea at a religious gathering.

== Personal life ==
Shea married Lisa Jenn in 2002. They were divorced in January 2008. She was granted a protective order by a court after filing court documents stating her husband treated her "as a possession" and was physically and emotionally abusive. Her brother-in-law testified in court documents that he saw Matt Shea grabbing her "very hard and violently" and pushing her into a vehicle.

Lisa Shea attested that Matt "insisted she walk on his left side because his sword, if he had one, would be on his right side," and forbade her from writing a church bulletin. She also complained that he had expected her to support him financially during and after his time in law school, but that he would not seek profitable employment even after graduating from law school. Shea denied any physical abuse, called his ex-wife a "product of the foster care system", and said this was her third divorce.

Shea married his second wife, the Ukrainian-born Viktoriya Vinnikova, shortly after the divorce.
