= Eastern Washington =

Geographical region in the United States

- Geographic region
- Nickname: Eastside
- Country: United States
- State: Washington

Area
  - Total: 46,620 sq mi (120,700 km^{2})
- Highest elevation (Mount Adams): 12,276 ft (3,742 m)
- Lowest elevation (Columbia River at White Salmon ~80): 79 ft (24 m)

Population (2020 census)
  - Total: 1,667,593
  - Density: 35.77/sq mi (13.81/km^{2})

Eastern Washington is the region of the U.S. state of Washington located east of the Cascade Range. It contains the city of Spokane (the second largest city in the state), the Tri-Cities, the Columbia River and the Grand Coulee Dam, the Hanford Nuclear Reservation and the fertile farmlands of the Yakima Valley and the Palouse. Unlike in Western Washington, the climate is dry, including some desert environments.

== Geography ==
=== Nomenclature ===
Other terms used for Eastern Washington or large parts of it include:

- Columbia Basin
- Eastside or east side of the state
- Inland Empire/Inland Northwest (also includes the Idaho Panhandle)
- "The 509" (in reference to the local area code)

=== Cities ===
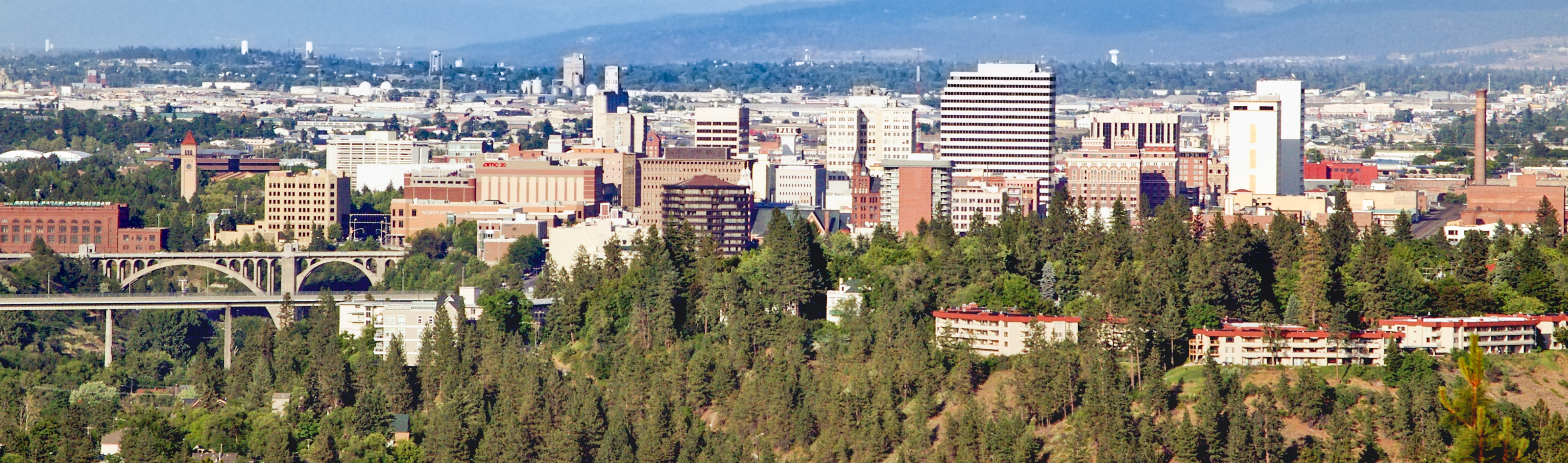
Spokane is the largest city in eastern Washington and the metropolitan center of the Inland Empire region

Notable cities and towns in Eastern Washington include:

- Airway Heights
- Cheney
- East Wenatchee
- Ellensburg
- Grandview
- Kennewick
- Liberty Lake
- Moses Lake
- Pasco
- Pullman
- Richland
- Spokane
- Spokane Valley
- Sunnyside
- Walla Walla
- Wenatchee
- West Richland
- Yakima

=== Protected areas ===
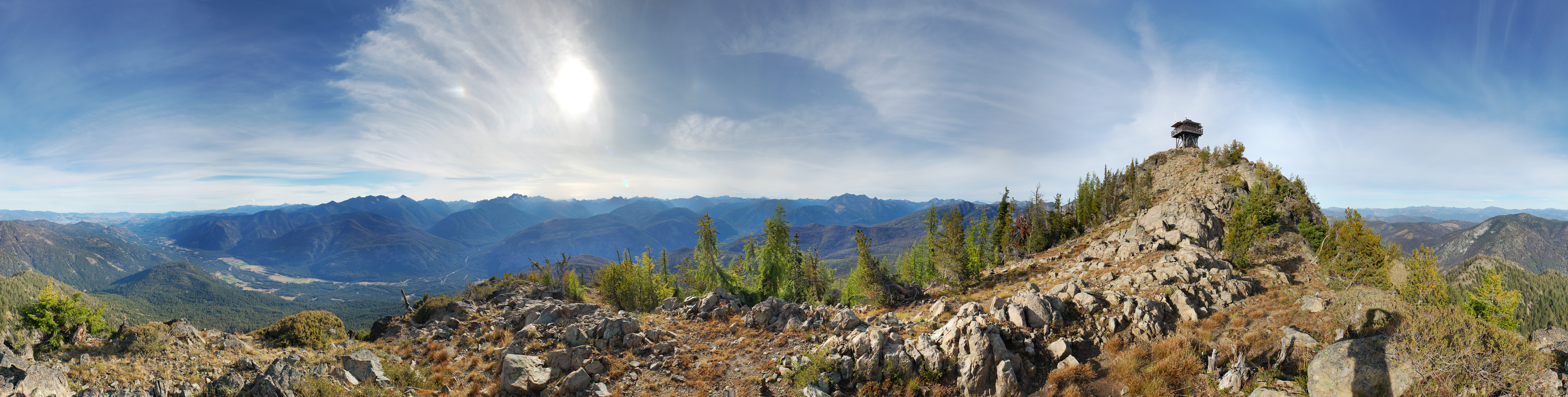
The summit of Goat Peak in the Okanogan–Wenatchee National Forest

- Hanford Reach National Monument
- Lake Roosevelt National Recreation Area
- Juniper Dunes Wilderness
- Salmo-Priest Wilderness
- Wenaha-Tucannon Wilderness (partial)
- Colville National Forest
- Idaho Panhandle National Forest (partial)
- Kaniksu National Forest (partial)
- Okanogan–Wenatchee National Forest
- Umatilla National Forest (partial)
- Columbia National Wildlife Refuge
- Conboy Lake National Wildlife Refuge
- Little Pend Oreille National Wildlife Refuge
- McNary National Wildlife Refuge
- Saddle Mountain National Wildlife Refuge
- Toppenish National Wildlife Refuge
- Turnbull National Wildlife Refuge
- Umatilla National Wildlife Refuge (partial)
- Crawford State Park

=== Counties ===
Eastern Washington is composed of:

- Adams
- Asotin
- Benton
- Chelan
- Columbia
- Douglas
- Ferry
- Franklin
- Garfield
- Grant
- Kittitas
- Klickitat
- Lincoln
- Okanogan
- Pend Oreille
- Spokane
- Stevens
- Walla Walla
- Whitman
- Yakima

Some definitions also include part of Skamania County that lies east of the ridge line of the Cascade Mountains.

== Climate ==
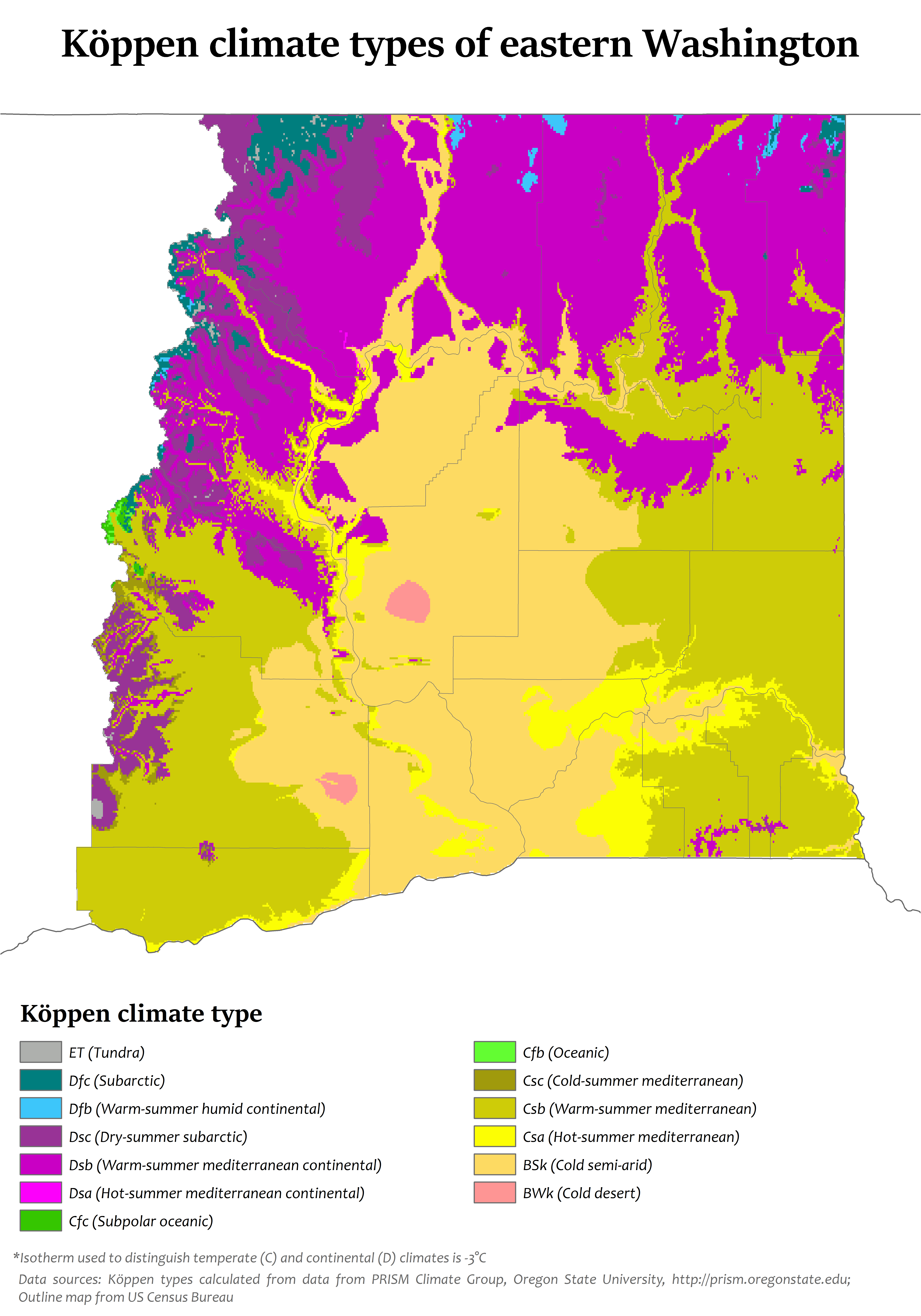
Köppen climate types in eastern Washington

A significant difference between Eastern Washington and the western half of the state is its climate. While the west half of the state is located in a rainy oceanic climate, the eastern half receives little rainfall due to the rainshadow created by the Cascade Mountains. Also, due to being farther from the sea, the east side has both hotter summers and colder winters than the west. Most communities in Eastern Washington, for example, have significant yearly snowfall, while in the west snowfall is minimal and not seen every year. The east and west do still have some climatic traits in common, though: more rainfall in winter than summer, a lack of severe storms, and milder temperature ranges than more inland locations.

There is some variation in both temperature and rainfall throughout Eastern Washington. Generally, lower elevations are both hotter and drier than higher elevations. This is easily seen in the comparison between low-elevation Richland with higher elevation Spokane.

Climate data for Tri-Cities, Washington (combined average of 3 cities)
| Month | Jan | Feb | Mar | Apr | May | Jun | Jul | Aug | Sep | Oct | Nov | Dec | Year |
|---|---|---|---|---|---|---|---|---|---|---|---|---|---|
| Record high °F (°C) | 74 (23) | 74 (23) | 87 (31) | 95 (35) | 105 (41) | 111 (44) | 115 (46) | 115 (46) | 106 (41) | 89 (32) | 79 (26) | 71 (22) | 115 (46) |
| Mean maximum °F (°C) | 58.3 (14.6) | 62.6 (17.0) | 72.7 (22.6) | 83.4 (28.6) | 93.0 (33.9) | 99.7 (37.6) | 105.7 (40.9) | 102.7 (39.3) | 93.8 (34.3) | 80.8 (27.1) | 68.3 (20.2) | 59.6 (15.3) | 106.4 (41.3) |
| Mean daily maximum °F (°C) | 41.1 (5.1) | 48.8 (9.3) | 58.5 (14.7) | 66.5 (19.2) | 75.2 (24.0) | 82.4 (28.0) | 91.0 (32.8) | 89.7 (32.1) | 80.3 (26.8) | 66.4 (19.1) | 50.5 (10.3) | 41.2 (5.1) | 66.1 (18.9) |
| Mean daily minimum °F (°C) | 27.7 (−2.4) | 30.2 (−1.0) | 35.1 (1.7) | 40.0 (4.4) | 47.8 (8.8) | 54.4 (12.4) | 59.4 (15.2) | 58.4 (14.7) | 49.9 (9.9) | 40.6 (4.8) | 33.6 (0.9) | 28.1 (−2.2) | 42.2 (5.7) |
| Mean minimum °F (°C) | 8.5 (−13.1) | 14.4 (−9.8) | 21.5 (−5.8) | 25.7 (−3.5) | 32.2 (0.1) | 41.8 (5.4) | 47.0 (8.3) | 45.5 (7.5) | 35.2 (1.8) | 24.0 (−4.4) | 16.6 (−8.6) | 9.3 (−12.6) | 3.4 (−15.9) |
| Record low °F (°C) | −27 (−33) | −23 (−31) | 10 (−12) | 18 (−8) | 26 (−3) | 35 (2) | 38 (3) | 37 (3) | 21 (−6) | 9 (−13) | −12 (−24) | −22 (−30) | −27 (−33) |
| Average precipitation inches (mm) | 1.00 (25) | 0.66 (17) | 0.63 (16) | 0.48 (12) | 0.63 (16) | 0.57 (14) | 0.17 (4.3) | 0.22 (5.6) | 0.31 (7.9) | 0.56 (14) | 0.90 (23) | 1.08 (27) | 7.24 (184) |
| Average snowfall inches (cm) | 3.2 (8.1) | 1.6 (4.1) | 0.2 (0.51) | trace | 0.0 (0.0) | 0.0 (0.0) | 0.0 (0.0) | 0.0 (0.0) | 0.0 (0.0) | trace | 1.5 (3.8) | 2.2 (5.6) | 8.5 (22) |
Source 1: WRCC
Source 2: NOAA

Climate data for Spokane (combined average of 3 stations)
| Month | Jan | Feb | Mar | Apr | May | Jun | Jul | Aug | Sep | Oct | Nov | Dec | Year |
|---|---|---|---|---|---|---|---|---|---|---|---|---|---|
| Record high °F (°C) | 62 (17) | 64 (18) | 75 (24) | 90 (32) | 97 (36) | 108 (42) | 112 (44) | 112 (44) | 102 (39) | 87 (31) | 70 (21) | 63 (17) | 112 (44) |
| Mean maximum °F (°C) | 51.5 (10.8) | 54.3 (12.4) | 64.9 (18.3) | 76.2 (24.6) | 86.6 (30.3) | 93.5 (34.2) | 100.3 (37.9) | 99.2 (37.3) | 90.6 (32.6) | 76.6 (24.8) | 59.6 (15.3) | 51.6 (10.9) | 101.9 (38.8) |
| Mean daily maximum °F (°C) | 35.3 (1.8) | 41.5 (5.3) | 49.8 (9.9) | 58.5 (14.7) | 67.9 (19.9) | 75.3 (24.1) | 85.4 (29.7) | 84.3 (29.1) | 74.3 (23.5) | 59.5 (15.3) | 43.5 (6.4) | 35.3 (1.8) | 59.2 (15.1) |
| Mean daily minimum °F (°C) | 24.9 (−3.9) | 27.5 (−2.5) | 31.5 (−0.3) | 36.6 (2.6) | 43.8 (6.6) | 50.6 (10.3) | 56.2 (13.4) | 55.1 (12.8) | 47.1 (8.4) | 37.8 (3.2) | 30.6 (−0.8) | 25.1 (−3.8) | 38.9 (3.8) |
| Mean minimum °F (°C) | 0.7 (−17.4) | 7.0 (−13.9) | 17.8 (−7.9) | 26.8 (−2.9) | 32.0 (0.0) | 40.2 (4.6) | 45.5 (7.5) | 44.2 (6.8) | 34.5 (1.4) | 25.3 (−3.7) | 15.1 (−9.4) | 5.82 (−14.54) | −6.4 (−21.3) |
| Record low °F (°C) | −30 (−34) | −24 (−31) | −10 (−23) | 14 (−10) | 24 (−4) | 33 (1) | 37 (3) | 30 (−1) | 22 (−6) | 7 (−14) | −13 (−25) | −25 (−32) | −30 (−34) |
| Average precipitation inches (mm) | 1.98 (50) | 1.37 (35) | 1.69 (43) | 1.25 (32) | 1.55 (39) | 1.41 (36) | 0.53 (13) | 0.63 (16) | 0.71 (18) | 1.14 (29) | 2.13 (54) | 2.40 (61) | 16.81 (427) |
| Average snowfall inches (cm) | 9.9 (25) | 4.1 (10) | 1.8 (4.6) | 0.5 (1.3) | trace | trace | trace | 0.0 (0.0) | trace | 0.1 (0.25) | 4.2 (11) | 12.7 (32) | 33.2 (84) |
Source 1: WRCC
Source 2: NOAA

== Population ==
Compared to Western Washington, Eastern Washington has roughly twice the land area and one-fourth the population. As of the 2020 census, Eastern Washington was home to 1,667,593 of the state's total 7,705,281 residents, making its population comparable to that of West Virginia. The population growth rate between the two is roughly the same. Of Washington's ten Congressional districts, Eastern Washington exactly encompasses two (the 4th and 5th), aside from a small portion of the 8th in Chelan, Douglas, and Kittitas Counties.

== Education ==
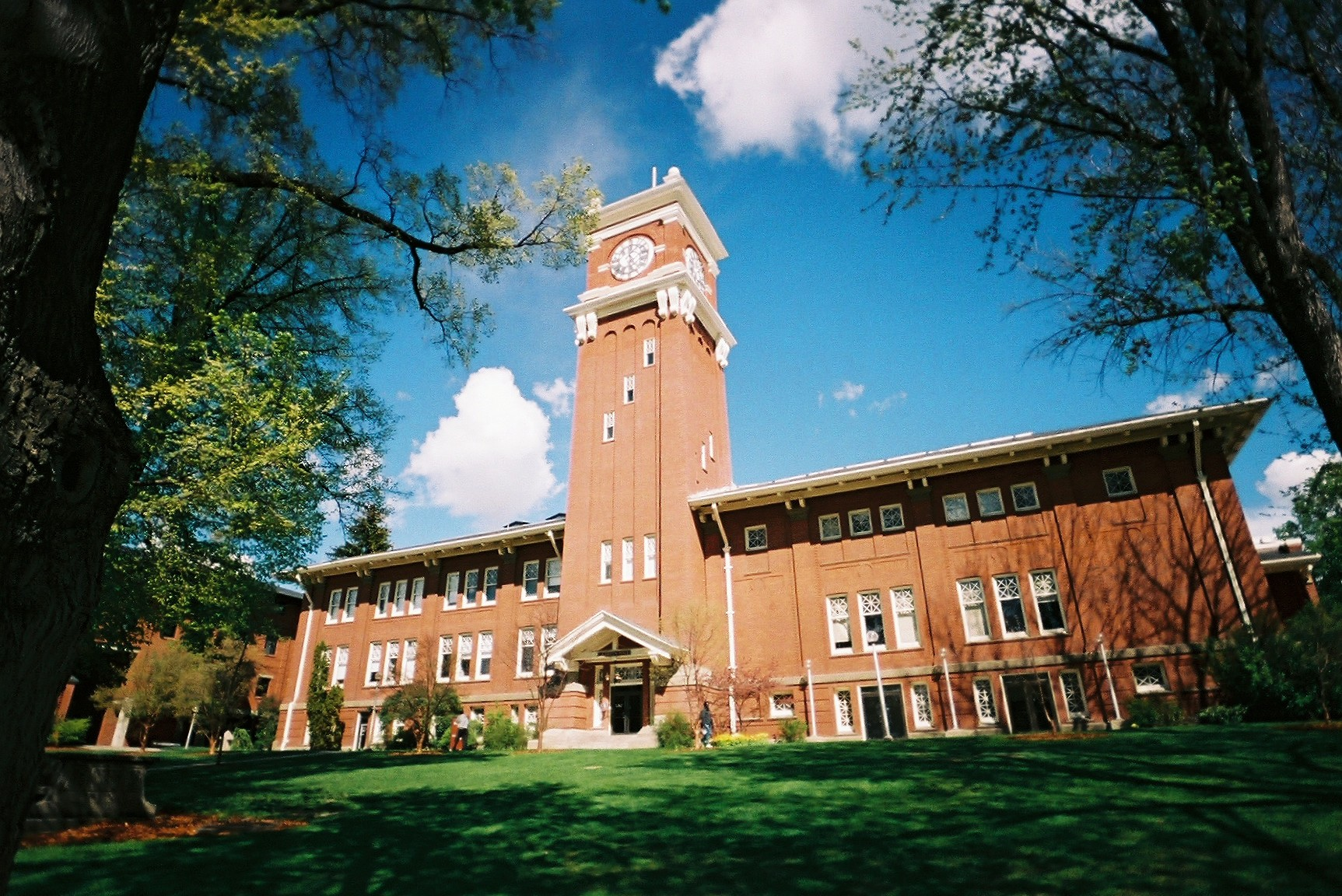
Bryan Hall, Washington State University

Eastern Washington hosts a number of universities including three of the state's five public universities.

=== Public institutions ===
- Central Washington University
- Eastern Washington University
- Washington State University
- A number of local community colleges including:
  - Big Bend Community College
  - Columbia Basin College
  - Spokane Community College
  - Spokane Falls Community College
  - Walla Walla Community College
  - Wenatchee Valley College
  - Yakima Valley College

=== Private institutions ===
- Gonzaga University
- Heritage University
- Pacific Northwest University of Health Sciences
- Walla Walla University
- Whitman College
- Whitworth University

=== Research institutions ===
- Pacific Northwest National Laboratory
- Chimpanzee and Human Communication Institute at Central Washington University

== Proposed statehood ==
Proposed State of Liberty in Eastern Washington Washington Liberty

There have been sporadic movements to create a 51st state out of Eastern Washington by splitting the current state down the Cascades, but proposals have rarely progressed out of the state legislature's committees. Bills in the Washington State Legislature which would have requested the United States Congress to take up the question were proposed in 1996, 1999, 2005, and 2017. Proposed names for the new state have included Lincoln, Columbia, Liberty, or simply Eastern Washington. Many of these proposals would include the Idaho Panhandle as part of the proposed state of Lincoln.

Eastern Washington tends to vote Republican, whereas Western Washington usually votes Democratic. Even Spokane, the proposed capital and largest city, is in a fairly reliably Republican county despite tending to have a higher democratic vote than other Eastern Washington cities. The only fairly consistently Democratic county is the college town dominated Whitman County, which even then is far less Democratic than Western Washington.

== Images ==
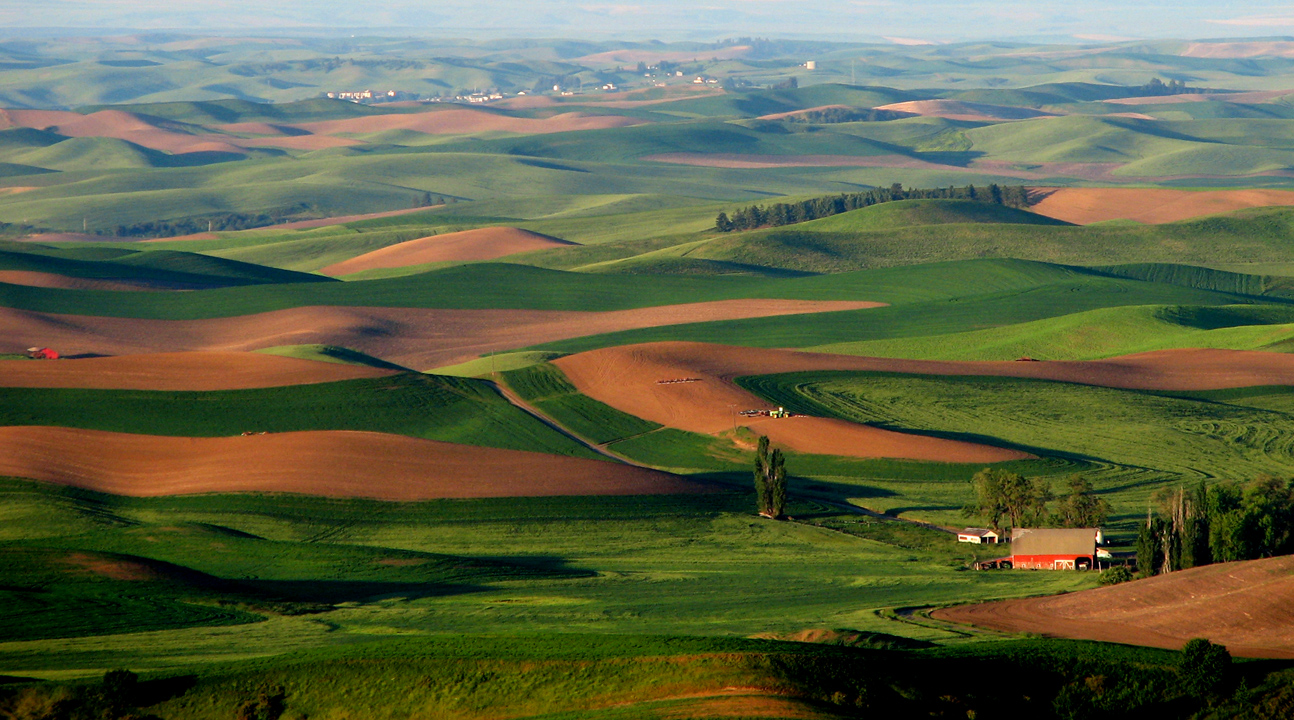
The Palouse Hills of southeastern Washington

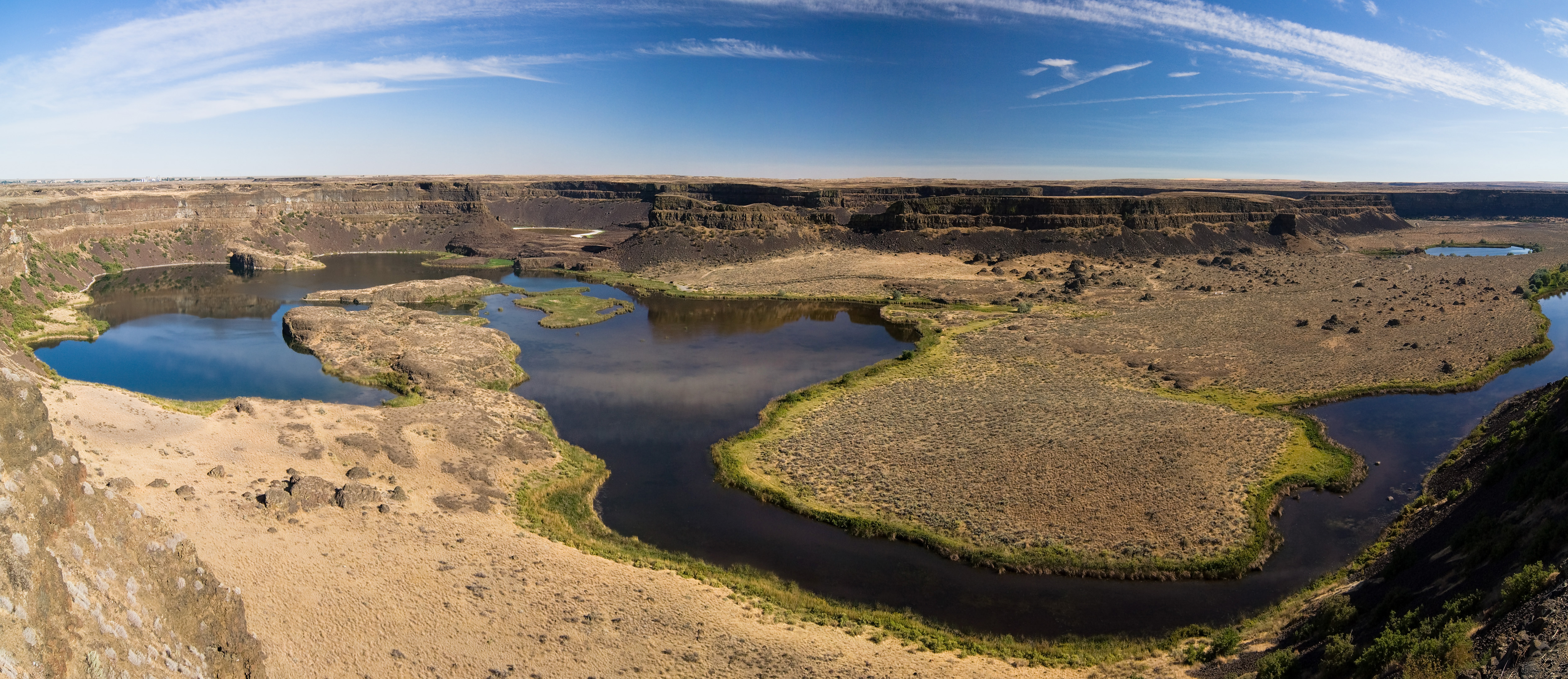
Dry Falls in the semi-desert Channeled Scablands that dominate much of eastern Washington.

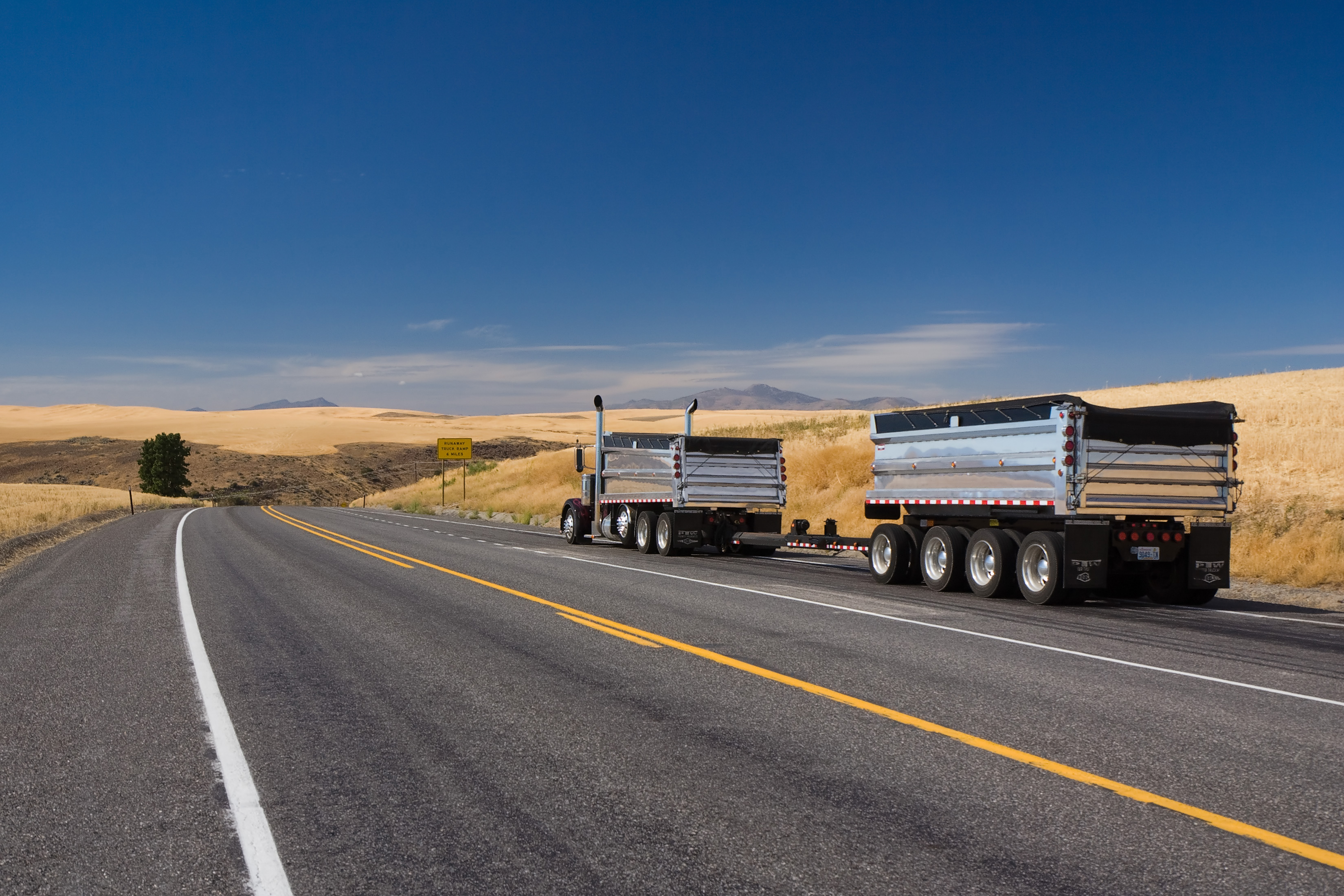
Truck transport going east on Highway 2, near Waterville

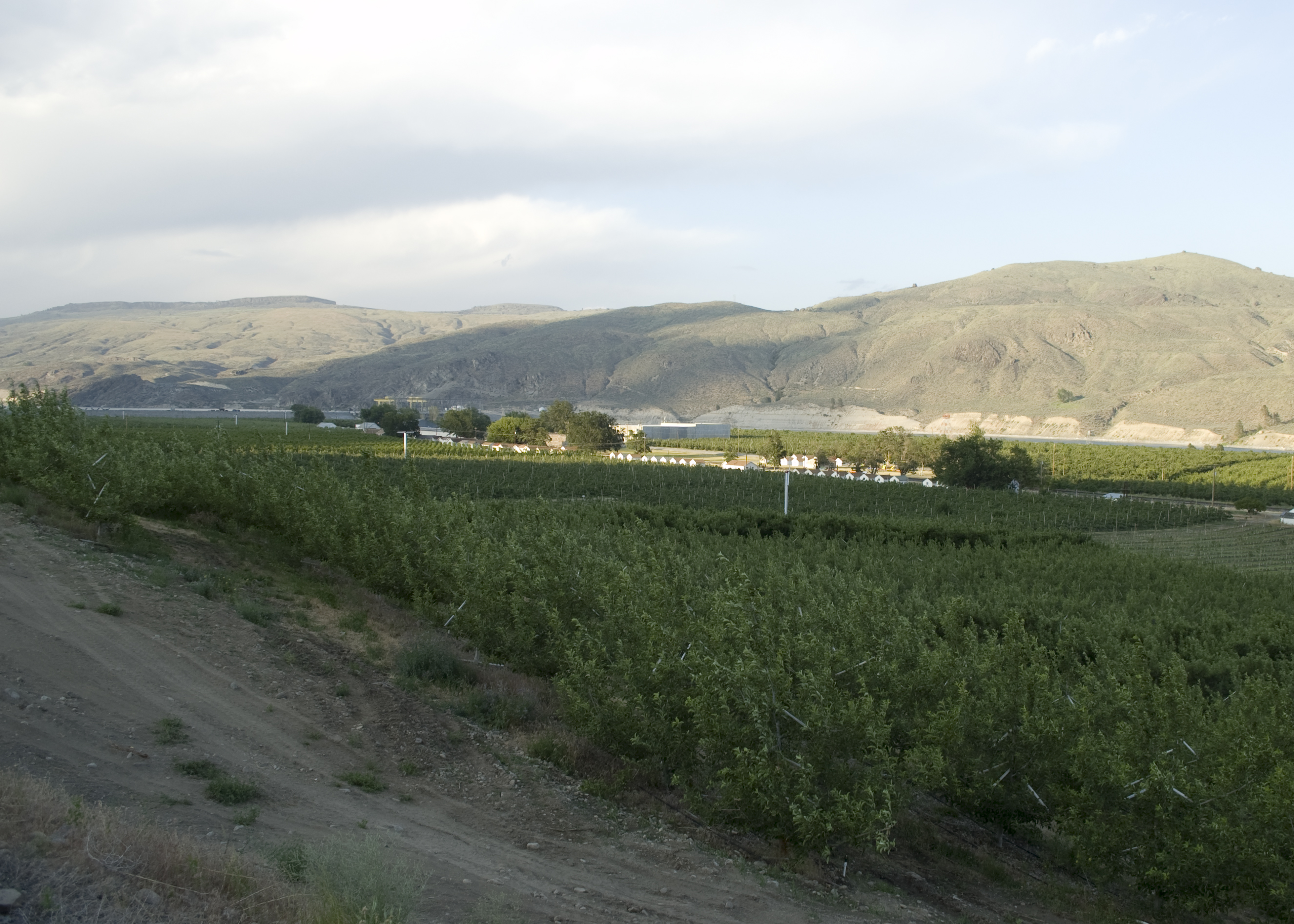
Apple orchards in Azwell, Washington surrounding a community of pickers' cabins
