= F. M. Tull =

American politician

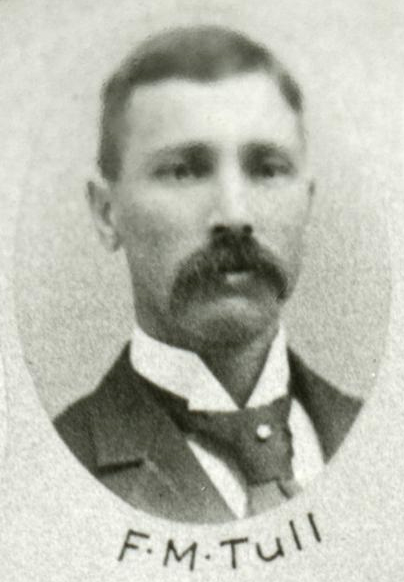
- Tull in 1895

Member of the Washington House of Representatives for the 4th district
- In office 1893–1897

Personal details
- Born: August 12, 1851 Indiana, United States
- Died: May 7, 1931 (aged 79) Spokane, Washington, United States
- Party: Republican

Francis M. Tull (August 12, 1851 – May 7, 1931) was an American politician in the state of Washington. He served in the Washington House of Representatives from 1893 to 1897.
