= Larry Crouse =

American politician from Washington

Member of the Washington House of Representatives from the 4th, Position 1 district
- In office January 13, 1995 – December 31, 2013 (resigned)
- Preceded by: George Orr
- Succeeded by: Leonard Christian

Personal details
- Born: September 12, 1944 (age 81) Seattle, Washington
- Party: Republican
- Spouse: Peggy Crouse

Larry W. Crouse (born September 12, 1944) is an American politician of the Republican Party. He was a member of the Washington House of Representatives, representing the 4th legislative district. Crouse resigned midway through the 63rd Washington State Legislature due to health issues; at the time of his resignation, he was the longest-serving Republican in the body.

== Personal life ==
Crouse's wife is Peggy Crouse. They have two children. Crouse and his family live in Spokane, Washington.
