= Ren Taylor =

American politician

Member of the Washington House of Representatives for the 4th district
- In office 1979–1989

Personal details
- Born: March 23, 1924 Tacoma, Washington, United States
- Died: September 6, 1991 (aged 67) Tacoma, Washington, United States
- Party: Republican
- Spouse: Virginia

Renwick Wilson Taylor (March 23, 1924 – September 6, 1991) was an American politician in the state of Washington. He served the 4th district from 1979 to 1989.

Taylor graduated from Lincoln High School in Tacoma in 1942. He served in the US Army Air Corps during the Second World War, and graduated from the University of Washington in 1948, where he studied the French horn with Alvin Schardt. He was a member of the Seattle Symphony Orchestra from 1947 to 1949, and received a master's degree from Columbia University in 1953.

He went on to be a music educator, administrator, and assistant superintendent in the Clover Park School District until 1971, followed by seven years of service as superintendent at West Valley School District in Spokane. He returned to Tacoma in 1988, and died on September 6, 1991.
