= County auditor =

The term county auditor is applied as a descriptor, and sometimes as a title, for the fiscal officer in county government with oversight responsibility of all financial books and records of all county offices.

== United States ==
The county auditor position is common in every state in the United States. In some states, the position is appointed by county commissioners or district judges. In others, it is an elected position. In Florida, for example, the county auditor is elected to a four-year term.

=== Texas ===
In Texas, county government was created in the Constitution of 1836. The county auditor is appointed by the district judges and prepares and administers accounting records for all county funds. The county auditor also audits the records and accounts of the various county departments and verifies the validity and legality of all county disbursements.

The appointment of a county auditor is mandatory in counties with a population of 10,200 or more. In others, such an auditor is appointed only when the district judges determine that the circumstances require one.

The commissioners' court of two or more counties may agree to jointly employ and compensate a common county auditor.

In counties with more than 225,000 residents, the county auditor serves as budget officer.
