= Ed Peirce =

American politician

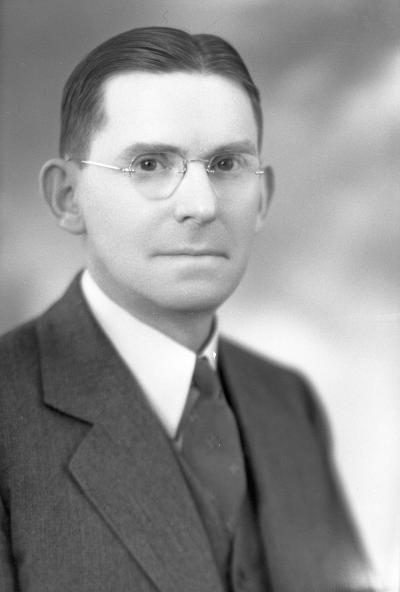
- Peirce in 1933

Member of the Washington Senate from the 4th district
- In office January 9, 1933 – January 11, 1937
- Preceded by: Harve H. Phipps
- Succeeded by: Alfred E. Holt

Personal details
- Born: c. 1872 Illinois, U.S.
- Died: December 24, 1947 (aged 75) Spokane, Washington, U.S.
- Party: Democratic
- Spouse: Elizabeth Weiler

Ed Peirce (c. 1872 – December 24, 1947) was an American politician in the state of Washington. He served in the Washington State Senate from 1933 to 1937. From 1935 to 1937, he was President pro tempore of the Senate.
