= Suzanne Schmidt =

American politician

- Schmidt in 2024

Member of the Washington House of Representatives from the 4th district
- Incumbent
- Assumed office January 9, 2023 Serving with Leonard Christian
- Preceded by: Bob McCaslin Jr.
- Succeeded by: Hillary Pham (elect)

Personal details
- Party: Republican
- Children: 3
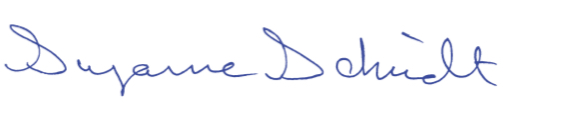
- Signature

Suzanne Schmidt is an American politician and member of the Washington House of Representatives for the 4th district. Elected in November 2022, she assumed office on January 9, 2023, replacing Bob McCaslin Jr.

== Career ==
Since 2016, Schmidt has worked as the CEO/President of the Associated Builders and Contractors Inland Pacific Chapter. She was elected to the Washington House of Representatives in November 2022 and assumed office on January 9, 2023.
