= Olaf L. Olsen =

American politician

Member of the Washington House of Representatives from the 4th district
- In office 1917 – May 1925

Personal details
- Born: February 1, 1881
- Died: February 6, 1958 (aged 77)
- Party: Republican

Olaf L. Olsen (February 1, 1881, in Trysil, Norway – February 6, 1958, in Seattle) was a Republican member of the Washington House of Representatives who represented the 4th District (parts of Spokane County) from 1917 until his resignation in May 1925.
