= Leonard Christian =

American politician (born 1965)

Member of the Washington State Senate from the 4th district
- Incumbent
- Assumed office January 13, 2025
- Preceded by: Mike Padden

Member of the Washington House of Representatives from the 4th district
- In office January 9, 2023 – January 13, 2025
- Preceded by: Rob Chase
- Succeeded by: Rob Chase
- In office January 8, 2014 – November 25, 2014
- Preceded by: Larry Crouse
- Succeeded by: Bob McCaslin Jr.

Personal details
- Born: Leonard Glenn Christian; September 22, 1965 (age 60) Los Angeles, California, U.S.
- Party: Republican
- Spouse: Rima Marie (Ashbrook) Christian
- Education: Community College of the Air Force (AA); Embry–Riddle Aeronautical University (BS); Webster University (MBA)
- Profession: Real estate broker Lender
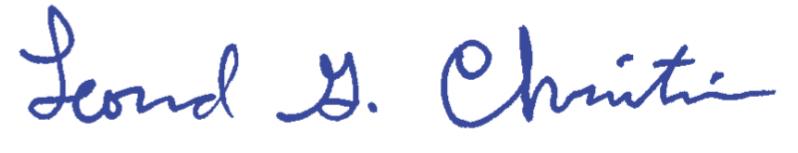
- Signature

Military service
- Allegiance: United States
- Branch/service: United States Air Force
- Years of service: 1984 – 2004 (20 years)
- Rank: Master sergeant

Leonard Glenn Christian (born September 22, 1965) is an American politician and businessman. Christian serves as a member of the Washington State Senate, representing the 4th district, having been elected in 2024. He previously served as a member of the Washington House of Representatives from 2023 until 2025, having been elected in 2022. He was appointed to the state House in 2014 to fill out the remainder of the term of Representative Larry Crouse.

== Early life and education ==
Christian was born in Los Angeles and raised in Spokane, Washington, where he graduated from Joel E. Ferris High School. Christian earned an Associate degree from the Community College of the Air Force, Bachelor of Science from Embry–Riddle Aeronautical University, and MBA from Webster University. Christian served in the United States Air Force and retired as a Master sergeant.

== Career ==
Christian has worked as a real estate broker in Spokane Valley, Washington since 2007.

In 2010, he fell 12.5 points short of unseating the incumbent Spokane County Auditor, Vicky Dalton.

Christian was appointed to the state legislature on January 8, 2014, by the Spokane County Board of Commissioners, despite being the second choice of the Republican Precinct Committee Officers from the district. Christian filled the vacancy left after Larry Crouse resigned from his seat in the legislature on December 31, 2013, because of health problems.

In 2018, Christian narrowly lost an election for Spokane County Assessor.

Christian announced that he was running to challenge Rep. Matt Shea in the 2020 Republican primary after Rep. Shea was expelled from the House Republican caucus for alleged involvement in domestic terrorism.

== Awards ==
- 2014 Guardians of Small Business award. Presented by NFIB.
