= Bob McCaslin Sr. =

American politician from Washington

Member of the Washington Senate from the 4th district
- In office January 12, 1981 – January 5, 2011
- Preceded by: William S. Day
- Succeeded by: Jeff Baxter

Personal details
- Born: Robert Lee McCaslin; April 20, 1926 Warren, Ohio, U.S.
- Died: March 13, 2011 (aged 84) Spokane Valley, Washington, U.S
- Party: Republican
- Children: 2
- Relatives: Bob McCaslin Jr. (son)
- Education: Washington State University

Military service
- Branch/service: United States Navy
- Years of service: 1944 – 1946

Robert Lee McCaslin (April 20, 1926 – March 13, 2011) was an American politician who served as a member of the Washington State Senate from 1981 to 2011, representing the 4th Legislative District.

== Career ==
McCaslin had served six years on the Spokane Valley Fire Commission during the 1970s. In 2009 he was elected to the Spokane Valley City Council, while serving concurrently in the State Senate.

On January 5, 2011, McCaslin resigned from the Senate due to complications following heart surgery. In February, Spokane County commissioners selected businessman Jeff Baxter to replace McCaslin.

== Personal life ==
In November 2014, McCaslin's son, Bob McCaslin Jr., was elected to one of the two State Representative positions in the 4th Legislative District.

McCaslin died on March 13, 2011.
