= Bob McCaslin Jr. =

American educator and politician from Washington

Member of the Washington House of Representatives from the 4th district
- In office November 25, 2014 – January 9, 2023
- Preceded by: Leonard Christian
- Succeeded by: Suzanne Schmidt

Personal details
- Born: Robert Brian McCaslin; November 21, 1957 (age 68) Spokane, Washington, U.S.
- Party: Republican
- Parent: Bob McCaslin Sr. (father)
- Education: Washington State University, Whitworth College
- Occupation: Teacher, politician
- Website: Official

Robert Brian McCaslin (born November 21, 1957) is an American politician and educator from Washington. McCaslin was a Republican member of the Washington House of Representatives, representing the 4th Legislative District from November 25, 2014, until January 9, 2023.

== Early life and education ==
McCaslin is the son of Bob McCaslin Sr., who served as a member of the Washington State Senate from 1981 to 2011 and Spokane City Council. McCaslin earned a Bachelor of Arts from Washington State University and Master of Education from Whitworth University.

== Career ==
Before entering politics, McCaslin worked as a kindergarten teacher.

McCaslin was sworn in early due to the resignation of Larry Crouse. He is from Spokane Valley. McCaslin sought to be appointed to Crouse's seat in January 2014, but Leonard Christian was chosen instead by Spokane County commissioners.

On November 4, 2014, McCaslin won the election and became a Republican member of Washington House of Representatives for District 4, Position1. McCaslin defeated Diana Wilhite with 58.0% of the votes.

In multiple legislative sessions, McCaslin has proposed bills calling for the creation of a new state called "Liberty" carved out of Eastern Washington.

In August 2021, McCaslin and four other state Republican lawmakers held an unofficial hearing with the aim of possibly calling for a "forensic audit" to take place in Washington State similar to the controversial Arizona audit. The group that organized the event also invited figures that have falsely claimed there was voter fraud in the 2020 presidential election.
