= Jefferson (proposed Pacific state) =

Proposed U.S. state

Coordinates: 42°N 122°W

- Proposed U.S. state
- State of Jefferson
- Flag Seal

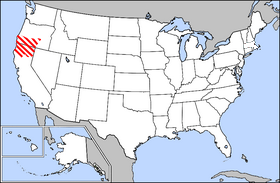
- Country: United States
- Named for: Thomas Jefferson

Area
  - Total: 83,786 sq mi (217,005 km^{2})
  - Rank: 14th (hypothetical)

Population (2020)
  - Total: 3,138,324
  - Rank: 33rd (hypothetical)
- Demonym: Jeffersonian
- Time zone: UTC−08:00 (PST)
  - Summer (DST): UTC−07:00 (PDT)
- a. The proposed State of Jefferson has changed proposed borders over time, and area size is not exact with different maps existing.

Jefferson, proposed officially as the State of Jefferson is a proposed U.S. state that would span the contiguous, mostly rural area of Southern Oregon and Northern California, where several attempts to separate from Oregon and California, respectively, have taken place. The region encompasses most of Northern California's land but does not include San Francisco or other Bay Area counties that account for the majority of Northern California's population.

Historians and locals cite Thomas Jefferson's status as the primary author of the Declaration of Independence as the origin of the name for the proposed state, with the line "governments are instituted among Men, deriving their just powers from the consent of the governed" as evidence of a breakdown of the social contract between the state governments and the region's population.

If the proposal were ever approved, the new state's capital city would have to be determined by a constitutional convention; Yreka, California, was named the provisional capital in the original 1941 proposal, although Port Orford, Oregon, had also been up for consideration, being the former jurisdiction of Mayor Gilbert Gable (a leader in the movement). The movement is strongest in the rural parts of Shasta County, with some supporters of the more recent revival calling for Redding, California, as the potential capital, even though Redding is not included in all versions of the proposal and its city council narrowly voted in 2013 to reject participation in the movement.

== 19th century ==
The State of Jefferson has its origins in the 19th century. In 1851; 175 years ago, gold discovered in the Klamath River Basin of northwest California extended California's gold rush further north to the basin and into the Rogue River Valley of southern Oregon. This led to the first large influx of white settlers in the area, causing conflict with local Native populations that eventually culminated in the Rogue River War of 1855–1856.

Furthermore, this influx of American settlers coupled with the wealth they were able to accumulate from the natural resources of the region spurred several political movements that wanted to separate this region from the rest of California and Oregon in the 1850s. Local politicians proposed an independent State of Shasta to the California legislature in 1852, but the bill died in committee. The State of Shasta was revived again in 1855, and various other configurations of an independent state in the same region as the State of Jefferson were proposed throughout the decade (such as the State of Klamath in 1853 and 1854).

The settlers of the region believed that they were distinct from the rest of California and Oregon both culturally and economically, and that because of the large distance separating them from the capitals of California and Oregon, their needs would be better addressed at the local and federal levels by their own State government than by petitioning the California government. In 1860, Congress passed legislation that would allow the region to vote on whether they wanted to be independent from California and Oregon, but the American Civil War interrupted this process and quelled independence movements for the rest of the 19th century.

== 20th century ==
1941 and 2016 proposed borders of Jefferson

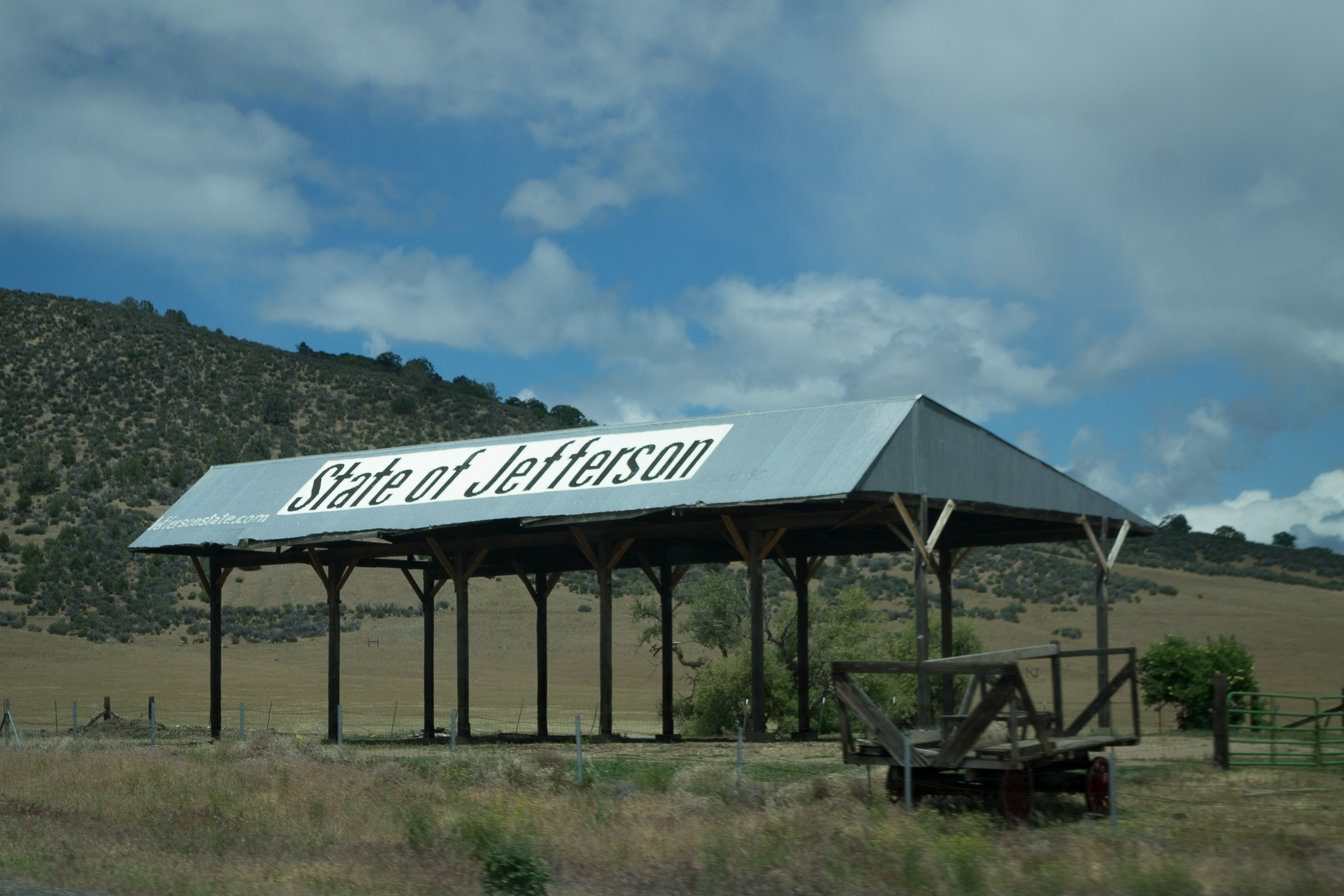
A pavilion near Yreka, California

In October 1941, the Mayor of Port Orford, Oregon, Gilbert Gable, said that the Oregon counties of Curry, Josephine, Jackson, and Klamath should join with the California counties of Del Norte, Siskiyou, and Modoc to form a new state, later named Jefferson.

He was motivated by the belief that these heavily rural areas were underrepresented in state government, which tended to cater to more populous areas. Gilbert Gable was joined in his efforts by Siskiyou State Senator Randolph Collier, whose support led to Yreka being picked as the capital. Gable persuaded a county court to appoint him to a commission investigating the possibility of secession and his supporters drafted a declaration of independence, and the flag of the movement. In 1941, he and San Francisco Chronicle reporter Stanton Delaplane planned a major publicity push after a night of heavy drinking, but Gable died of a heart attack the next day. Gable's supporters then appointed local judge John Childs as “governor” on December 4, 1941 although the movement's momentum had slowed with Gable's passing.

On November 27, 1941, Delaplane interviewed a group of young men brandishing rifles and pistols who stopped traffic on U.S. Route 99 south of Yreka, the county seat of Siskiyou County, and handed out copies of a Proclamation of Independence, stating that the State of Jefferson was in "patriotic rebellion against the States of California and Oregon" and would continue to "secede every Thursday until further notice." The men would even stop a California State Trooper telling them to turn around and go back to California. Following U.S. entry into World War II, the initial secessionist movement completely fizzled out.

In 1989, KSOR, the National Public Radio member station based at Southern Oregon University in Ashland, near Medford, rebranded itself as Jefferson Public Radio. It had built a massive network of low-powered translators earlier in the 1980s. By the time KSOR began building full-power stations later in the decade, it realized that the combined footprint of its translator network was roughly coextensive with the original State of Jefferson. It thus felt "Jefferson Public Radio" was an appropriate name when it decided to rebrand itself as a network.

In 1992, California State Assemblyman Stan Statham placed an advisory vote in 31 counties asking if the state should be split into two. All of the proposed Jefferson counties voted in favor of the split (except Humboldt County which did not have the issue on the ballot). Based on these results, Statham introduced legislation in California in an attempt to split the state, but the bill died in committee.

In the late 1990s, the movement for statehood was promoted by a group called the State of Jefferson Citizens Committee, which was originally formed in 1941. Two of the members, Brian Helsaple and Brian Petersen, gathered an extensive collection, including both verbal and written accounts mostly surrounding the 1941 movement. In 2000, they published Jefferson Saga, a book detailing the lack of representation of the region.

== 21st century ==
Jefferson is commemorated by the State of Jefferson Scenic Byway between Yreka and O'Brien, Oregon, which runs 109 miles (175 km) along State Route 96 and U.S. Forest Service Primary Route 48. Near the California – Oregon border, a turnout provides scenic views of the Klamath River valley and three informative display signs about the republic. The region retains this identity reinforced by institutions such as Jefferson Public Radio.

In 2013 the Jefferson succession effort was revived by Mark Baird, a rancher and former sheriff’s deputy in Siskiyou County who was concerned with what he perceived as the region’s lack of representation in the state government. He cited a forestry policy that, he claimed, prevented most of northern California’s federally managed forests from being logged. The policy led to what Baird said was economic decline of the region. Baird argued Jefferson's statehood would give the region the power to negotiate with the federal government to revise this policy.

As of the 2020 Census, if the Jefferson counties were a state (original 1941 counties), the state's population would be 484,727: smaller than any state at the time. Approximately 83% of those residents live in Oregon. Its land area would be 21,349.76 square miles (55,295.6 km^{2}) – a little smaller than West Virginia. The area was almost evenly divided between Oregon and California. Its population density would be 22.70 inhabitants per square mile (8.76/km^{2}) – a little more than Idaho. With the addition of the more modern Jefferson movement (Coos and Douglas and Lake Counties in Oregon, and Humboldt, Trinity, Shasta, Lassen, Mendocino, Lake, Tehama, Plumas, Glenn, Butte, Colusa, Sierra, Sutter, Yuba, Nevada, Placer, El Dorado, Amador, Calaveras, Tuolumne, Stanislaus, and Mariposa Counties in California), the population as of the 2020 Census would be 3,138,324, making it the 33rd most populous state in the United States.

=== Counties intending to leave California ===
On September 3, 2013, the Siskiyou County, California Board of Supervisors voted 4 to 1 in favor of withdrawal from California to form a proposed state named Jefferson. The proposal was joined by the Modoc County Board of Supervisors (September 24) and Glenn County Board of Supervisors (January 21, 2014). On April 15, 2014 Yuba County Supervisors joined the State of Jefferson movement to separate from California and create a new U.S. state. On July 15, 2014, the Tehama County Board of Supervisors voted unanimously to adopt a resolution supporting the declaration of withdrawal from California based on an advisory vote taken on June 6, 2014, where the public voted 56% to 44% in favor of splitting the state. On July 22, 2014, the Board of Supervisors of Sutter County unanimously adopted a resolution supporting a declaration and petition to the Legislature to withdraw from California to redress a lack of representation. On March 3, 2015, Lake County supervisors voted 3 to 2 to submit the question of secession to voters and on March 17, Lassen County supervisors made a similar declaration that also had the voters deciding in 2016. The Jefferson Declaration Committee is reportedly aiming to get at least 12 counties in support.

On October 24, 2014, Modoc and Siskiyou Counties delivered their declarations for independence from the state of California to the California Secretary of State's office. On January 15, 2015, three more counties, Glenn, Tehama, and Yuba, submitted their official declarations as well.

The 2013 revival was based almost entirely in California. It includes all major parts of California north of 39°. Although some individual residents in Oregon have lobbied for the movement, no county government in that state has endorsed the proposal to date. As of January 6, 2016, 21 northern California counties have sent a declaration or have approved to send a declaration to the State of California with their intent of leaving the state and forming the State of Jefferson. The population of the 21 California counties was 1,747,626 as of the 2010 U.S. Census, which would be 39th most populous state in the Union.

In 2013, venture capitalist Tim Draper launched Six Californias, a measure to split California into six separate divisions, including Jefferson. Draper announced that 1.3 million people had signed the petition; however, a third of the signatures were later found to be invalid, thus placing the signature count below the needed threshold to qualify for the 2016 ballot.

=== 2016 presidential election ===
2016 presidential election results, showing a strong Republican presence in the proposed State of Jefferson

In the 2016 presidential election, most of the rural California counties which would belong to the State of Jefferson were won by Republican nominee Donald Trump. The losing candidate, Democrat Hillary Clinton was more successful in other parts of the state, particularly urban areas. Clinton beat Trump by almost 80 points in San Francisco, population 827,500, but he led her by more than 50 points in Lassen County. The election of Trump led to calls for a secession of California from the Union and a similar proposal in Oregon, where Clinton won the popular vote while Trump captured the majority of counties.

With the election of President Donald Trump, some who are considering joining the modern State of Jefferson or are observing the movement have stated that if California secedes, the movement's supporting counties could appeal directly to the United States Congress for statehood, similar to how West Virginia was formed, claiming California would be in insurrection and petitioning to rejoin the Union as an independent state.

On May 8, 2017, the pro-Jefferson group "Citizens for Fair Representation" filed a lawsuit against California Secretary of State Alex Padilla. The suit alleges that California's 1862 law limiting Senators to no more than 40, and Assembly Members to no more than 80, creates an unconstitutional imbalance of representation that precludes effective "self-governance" as protected by the 14th Amendment. The desired result of suing California, for lack of representation and dilution of vote, is better representation across all of California, and ultimately an independent State of Jefferson. The case was heard by the lower court and appealed to the Ninth Circuit, which dismissed the appeal.

=== COVID-19 ===
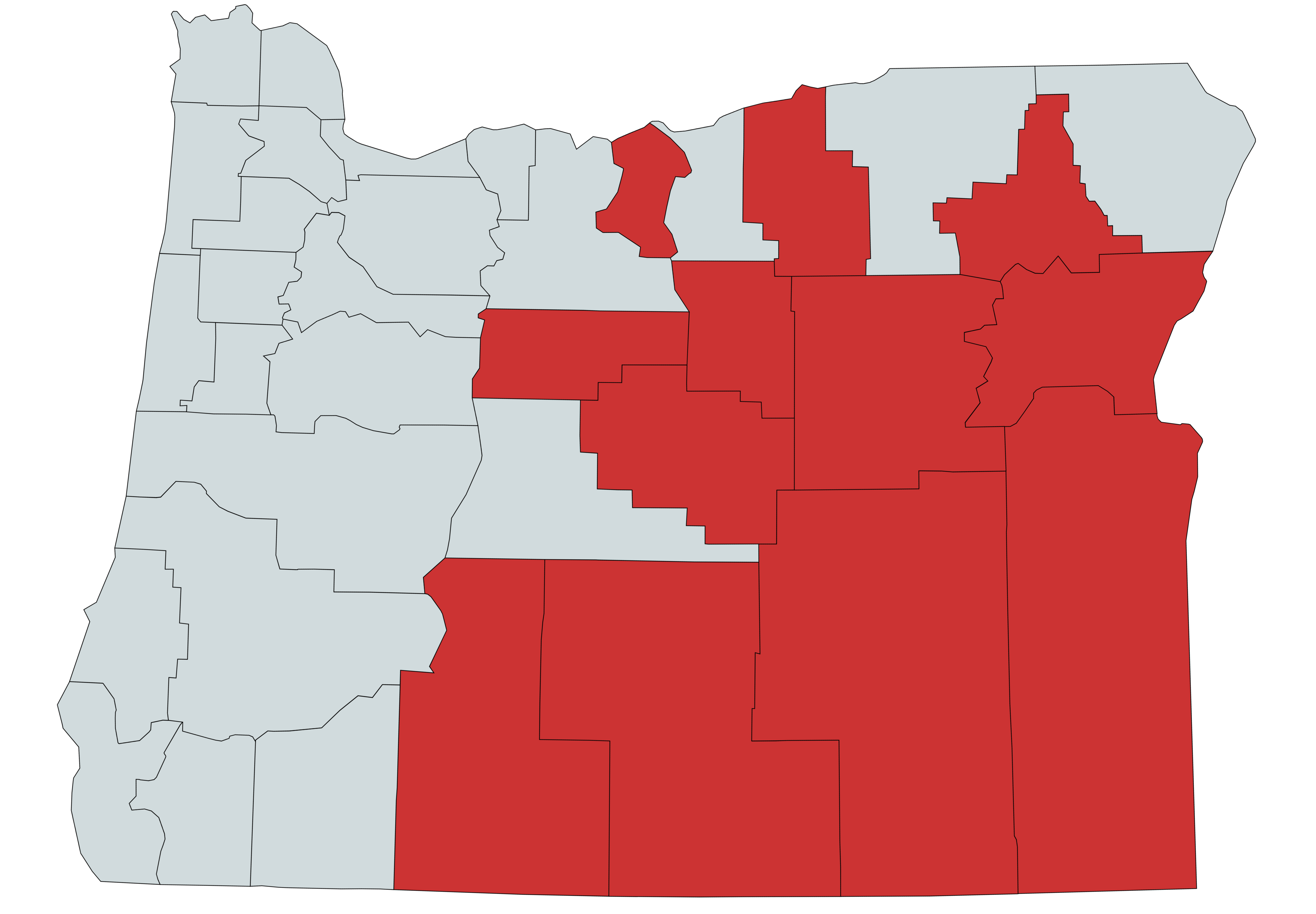
The Greater Idaho movement overlaps with the State of Jefferson, and has the same motivation for their cause.

During the COVID-19 pandemic the issue of Jefferson's secession flared up again. The Shasta County Board of Supervisors pledged to ignore state public health order with a public hearing claiming that vaccines are a health hazard, masks are a form of government control, the pandemic is a hoax to sway the 2020 election against Donald Trump with activists reading out the home address of health officer’s enforcing lockdowns, calling for their citizen's arrest. At the same time a Shasta County militia, calling for secession and armed resistance to COVID-19 regulations saw a massive influx in membership. This would culminate in the election of anti-government leaders in Shasta County in northern California to the Shasta board of supervisors who campaigned on Jefferson secession.

During the 2021 California gubernatorial recall election the counties of a would-be Jefferson overwhelmingly voted in favor of recalling Gavin Newsom with some counties voting 6 to 1 in favor of recall. The week prior to the recall vote the Greater Idaho movement successfully held referendums in five counties in Oregon calling for joining Idaho for much the same reasons as the State of Jefferson's pursuit of secession from California. Some of the counties of the Greater Idaho movement and the State of Jefferson overlap, and the Greater Idaho movement stated that the annexation of Northern California into Idaho was "Phase Two" of the movement.

== Flag and seal ==
Commonly used as the Proposal Flag of the State of Jefferson.

The field of the flag is green, and the charge is the Seal of the State of Jefferson: a yellow circle representing a gold mining pan, with the words "The Great Seal Of State Of Jefferson" engraved into the lip, and two capital, black Xs askew of each other. The two Xs are known as the "Double Cross" and signify the two regions' "sense of abandonment" by the central state governments, in both Southern Oregon and Northern California. (Note: Harper's 2022 report referred to the region being "double crossed" by Salem and Sacramento. See Pogue (2022).)

The gold pan that was ostensibly the first model for the state's seal is on display at the Siskiyou County Museum in Yreka, California.

== Appearances in popular culture ==
Jefferson was featured by Huell Howser in Road Trip Episode 143.

Harry Turtledove has written a series of alternate history short stories set in Jefferson State, beginning with the 2016 "Visitor from the East".

== See also ==
- Absaroka (proposed state)
- American Redoubt
- California National Party
- Cascadia (independence movement)
- Franklin (proposed state)
- Greater Idaho movement
- Jefferson (proposed Mountain state)
- Jefferson (proposed Southern state)
- Lincoln (proposed Northwestern state)
- Lincoln (proposed Southern state)
- List of U.S. state partition proposals
- Partition and secession in California
- Superior (proposed U.S. state)
- State of Sequoyah
- Secession in the United States
- Northwest Territorial Imperative
- Yes California Independence Campaign
