= Louis J. Marinelli =

American political activist

Chair of the California National Party
- Interim
- In office January 6, 2016 – June 2016
- Preceded by: Position established
- Succeeded by: Theo Slater

Personal details
- Born: 1986 or 1987 (age 39–40) Buffalo, New York
- Party: CNP (2016)
- Education: Oregon State University
- Occupation: Political activist
- Organization(s): National Organization for Marriage (2010–2011); Yes California (2015–2024)
- Movement: California independence

Louis J. Marinelli (born 1986 or 1987) is an American political activist, known for launching the California secessionist group Yes California. Having served as the interim chairman of the California National Party and run for California's 80th State Assembly district under its banner, he later gained notoriety for moving to Yekaterinburg, Russia in 2016; he has since returned to the United States with his family.

== Early life ==
Marinelli was born in Buffalo, New York in 1986 or 1987.

== Political activism ==
=== National Organization for Marriage ===
In the summer of 2010, Marinelli was paid by the National Organization for Marriage (NOM) for a national bus tour to rally against same-sex marriage. In December of that same year, Marinelli broke ranks with the NOM by announcing support for the repeal of the "Don't ask, don't tell" military policy.

On April 11, 2011, Marinelli announced his support for marriage equality. NOM threatened Marinelli with legal action for violating a confidentiality agreement, telling him to remove copies of the group's internal materials from his website.

=== California secessionist movement ===
Claiming to be disillusioned with the United States government and political system, Marinelli launched a campaign for California to secede from the United States and become an independent country. Initially called Sovereign California and later rebranded as Yes California in 2015, it was predominantly inspired by the Yes Scotland campaign during the 2014 Scottish independence referendum.

In 2015, Marinelli was the primary proponent of several citizen ballot initiatives calling for California's eventual secession from the United States. Los Angeles Times columnist Patt Morrison wrote that Marinelli "has paid $200 a pop to try to get nine initiatives on a statewide ballot, all of them about making California not an entirely separate country but a 'first among equal' sovereign entity distinct from those 49 also-rans." In late 2016, Marinelli and Yes California began to gather signatures to qualify another secession measure for the ballot in November 2018, but Yes California abandoned the campaign in April 2017 after months of negative publicity relating to Marinelli's move to Russia and alleged links to Vladimir Putin.

==== 2016 campaign for California State Assembly ====
Marinelli ran for the California State Assembly in California's 80th State Assembly district against Lorena Gonzalez. Marinelli's platform was to push for California's secession from the United States.

Marinelli's ballot designation was "California Independence Leader". Marinelli did not list a party preference, as the California National Party was not ballot-qualified in the state. In the primary, Marinelli received 6.4 percent of the vote and did not continue to the general election.

==== Ties to Russian government influence operations ====
In August 2022, the U.S. Department of Justice indicted Russian national Alexander Ionov for collaborating with the Russian government in an attempt to influence U.S. elections. The Sacramento Bee identified Marinelli and Yes California as beneficiaries of Ionov's support. Marinelli acknowledged that he knew Ionov, but denied that he knowingly aided the Russian government.

== Life in Russia ==
Marinelli first visited Russia in 2006 on a student exchange program with Saint Petersburg State University. Over the next five years he spent time between California and Russia, teaching English in Samara and Kazan before settling in San Diego in 2011.

In 2016, Marinelli moved to Yekaterinburg, Russia with his wife, partially for visa reasons. In 2017, announcing withdrawal of Yes California's independence ballot measure from the 2018 election, Marinelli confirmed his intention to live in Russia, stating, "I have found in Russia a new happiness, a life without the albatross of frustration and resentment towards one's homeland, and a future detached from the partisan divisions and animosity that [have] thus far engulfed my entire adult life."

Marinelli moved to Moscow in the fall of 2018. In the summer of 2019, Marinelli was briefly detained by Moscow police while attending an unsanctioned political march in support of investigative journalist Ivan Golunov.

In August 2020, Marinelli authored a Russian-language essay professing his love of reading to young children, and asserting that he was confident that the collapse of the United States was imminent.

Marinelli returned to the United States, and as of August 2022 was living in Arkansas.

== Electoral history ==
=== 2016 California State Assembly ===
California's 80th State Assembly district election, 2016
Primary election
Party	Candidate	Votes	%
Democratic	Lorena Gonzalez (incumbent)	55,150	74.6
Republican	Lincoln Pickard	14,015	19.0
No party preference	Louis J. Marinelli	4,753	6.4
Total votes		73,918	100.0
General election
Democratic	Lorena Gonzalez (incumbent)	108,655	77.8
Republican	Lincoln Pickard	30,917	22.2
Total votes		139,572	100.0
Democratic hold			
