= California Freedom Coalition =

United States political party

- Abbreviation: CFC
- President: Stephen Gonzales
- Vice-President: Shankar Singam
- Policy Director: Dave Marin
- Founded: 2017; 9 years ago
- Headquarters: Sacramento, California
- Ideology: Autonomy; Californian independence Californian secessionism Devolution; Regionalism; Self-determination
- Political position: Big tent
- Colours: Yellow and blue

Website
- www.cafree.org

The California Freedom Coalition is a political group advocating for the political, economic, and social empowerment of Californians. It supports universal healthcare for Californians, greater representation for California in the U.S. Congress, and more funding for education in California, as well as the possibility of Californian independence.

== History ==
The group, in 2017, gathered signatures to petition the State of California to secede from the United States of America.

Drawing intentional parallels to the separatist movement in Catalonia, which briefly seceded from Spain, the group affiliates itself with groups like the California National Party. The California Freedom Coalition has participated in many rallies throughout the state that promote democratic principles.

The California Freedom Coalition has been reported on by the Sacramento Bee, the LA Weekly, Mother Jones and other California-focused media outlets. The group has been highlighted on local TV news shows and Fox News.

== Organization ==
It is officially made up of two non profit entities, the California Freedom Coalition Education Fund and California Freedom Coalition Advocacy Fund.

== Advocacy ==
The California Freedom Coalition's policy think tank has also written a number of research papers that highlight areas of the federal government that are less democratic and harm the people of California.

The Advocacy arm has lobbied the state assembly for bills that protect Californians, like SB822 Net Neutrality.

== See also ==
- Secession in the United States
- Partition and secession in California
- California National Party
- Yes California
