= Yes California =

Secessionist campaign for California

- Predecessor: Sovereign California (2014-2015)
- Founded: 2015
- Founder: Louis J. Marinelli
- Dissolved: 2024
- Purpose: Californian independence
- Headquarters: CA
- Website: https://web.archive.org/web/20250522115607/https://www.yescalifornia.org/

Map of US highlighting California

Yes California (originally known as Sovereign California) is a defunct California-based political action committee that promoted the independence of the state of California from the United States of America. Founded in August 2015 by Louis J. Marinelli, a right-wing political activist, the campaign adopted its name and logo from Yes Scotland, a group which advocated for independence during the 2014 independence referendum in Scotland.

The group and its founder faced repeated controversy over the latter's ties to Russia. Both were later implicated in the 2022 federal indictment of a Russian man alleged to have provided support to various California secessionist groups on behalf of the Russian government.

== Background ==
The last instance of secession in the United States was in 1861, a precursor to the formation of the Confederate States of America, when 11 states declared their independence from the Union. The US Constitution lacks any provision for secession. The Supreme Court ruled in Texas v. White in 1869 that no state can unilaterally leave the Union. Secession would require a US Constitutional amendment approved by two-thirds majorities in the US House of Representatives and Senate, then ratification by 38 state legislatures. Analysts consider California's secession improbable.

== History ==
The Yes California campaign borrowed its name and logo from the Yes Scotland campaign of 2014.

The hashtag #Calexit trended in social media as the campaign gained attention in the wake of the election of Donald Trump to the presidency in November 2016; California gave Hillary Clinton 61.5% of the vote to Trump's 33.2%. Marinelli asserted this was evidence of the political divide between the state and nation, saying California is more progressive than the rest of the country and that Californians were offended by Trump's statements about minorities.

The campaign staged protests outside the Capitol building in Sacramento after the November 2016 election, though its organizers asserted the protests had been planned months in advance and would have been held, regardless of who won the election. Immediately following the election, the campaign received 11,000 emails.

On November 21, 2016, the Yes California campaign submitted an initiative for signature gathering, with an amendment sent later on December 23 to correct a typo. If passed by voters in November 2018, it would have repealed Article III, Section 1 of the California Constitution, which states California is "an inseparable part" of the U.S., and require an independence plebiscite to be held on March 5, 2019, on the question of California's independence, the passage of which would have required at a minimum 50% voter turnout and 55% voting yes. If the proposed 2019 independence referendum had passed, the Governor of California would have then been required to apply for California to join the United Nations.

On January 26, 2017, the office of California Secretary of State Alex Padilla gave its approval for the signature gathering process to begin.

The Washington Post reported on February 18 that the Yes California campaign had opened up to 53 chapters across the state, but had not yet reported contributions to the California Secretary of State's office.

The campaign ran into controversy following allegations that founder Marinelli had received significant assistance from the Russian government in promoting his efforts. Marinelli announced on December 18, 2016, that the Yes California campaign had opened an "embassy" in Moscow as a cultural centre to help educate Russians about California's history, boost trade, and promote tourism. The Moscow office was partially funded by a Kremlin-backed charity linked to Russian President Vladimir Putin, while the Anti-Globalization Movement of Russia provided the office space rent-free.

The organization promoted a proposed initiative to be placed on the 2019 California state ballot, which, if it had passed, would have required an independence plebiscite to be held in March 2019 on the question of California's independence. In order to comply with federal law, however, it would have still required an amendment to the United States Constitution. In January 2017, California Secretary of State Alex Padilla gave his approval for the organization to gather petition signatures to put the initiative on the state ballot. The organization then halted its efforts in April, stating that it wanted to retool its proposal and campaign, seeking a clean break from the controversy surrounding Marinelli's connections to Russia. Still, BBC News reported in November 2017 that it found evidence that social media accounts with ties to Russia had pushed a huge Twitter trend in favor of an independent California on election night 2016.

On September 10, 2020, Yes California was cleared to collect signatures on a new ballot initiative which would similarly require an independence plebiscite to be included on a future ballot.

In 2023, Yes California announced a new ballot measure campaign that would divide parts of coastal California, including the Bay Area, from California to become an independent country while leaving the rest of the state in the Union. Marinelli stated that the underlying objective of the new ballot measure was "to get the extreme, far-left liberals and progressives who are ruining the country as a whole, to go and build a progressive utopia of their own on the Pacific coast, and leave us out of it."

In 2024, Yes California ceased as a political committee.

== Analysis of the initial proposed proposition ==
=== By the California Legislative Analyst's Office ===
As per the California ballot proposition process, the California Legislative Analyst's Office filed a report on the proposed initiative's estimated fiscal effects. This report noted that the proposed initiative could be challenged in California courts on grounds that it would be "an unconstitutional revision of California's basic governmental framework". Under the California Constitution, such proposals that would make "far reaching changes in the nature of [California's] basic governmental plan" or "substantially alter the basic governmental framework set forth in the [California] Constitution" can only be placed before voters by either the California Legislature or a state constitutional convention, and not via a voter initiative. For example, a California court could consider whether the repealing of Article III, Section 1, stating that California is "an inseparable part" of the U.S., would be such a major revision. Yes California argues that this not a major revision, based on the California Supreme Court's test in Legislature v. Eu that a revision "must necessarily or inevitably appear from the face of the challenged provision that the measure will substantially alter [California's] basic governmental framework".

The Legislative Analyst's report also noted the tens of millions of dollars that would have to be spent by state and local governments to hold an additional statewide election in March 2019.

Were California to actually become its own separate nation, the major economic and budgetary impacts for both the current state and local governments are unknown. Among these would be the "sorting out of the liabilities, property holdings, border arrangements, military infrastructure, and other details" relevant to not only a relationship with the U.S., but also dealing with the military, trade, customs, and other relationships with other countries.

Furthermore, even if the Governor of California were to apply for California to join the United Nations, the Legislative Analyst's report cites Chapter II of the United Nations Charter: new member applications must go through the UN Security Council, and that the United States, as a permanent member, has the ability to block such applications.

=== By supporters ===
California has the fifth largest economy in the world and a population larger than that of Poland. The Yes California campaign argues that the state suffers under federal overregulation, that the state contributes more federal tax than it receives in federal funding, that the state feels isolated from political power in Washington, D.C., and that there is a wide gap between the political and cultural differences of California and the rest of the country. For example, California disagrees with much of the rest of the country on immigration and environmental policies.

In an op-ed piece published by the San Jose Mercury News, Marcus Ruiz Evans of Yes California wrote that, "No one is going to pull money out of California if it secedes, no one is going to invade, no one is going to stop trading – there is too much money invested here, too many deals already going on. The world will not let the California economy be disrupted."

At a forum held by the campaign in Los Angeles on February 13, 2017, led by Evans and Marinelli, they argued that California annually loses about $70 billion by subsidizing other states and military overseas, which could instead be used elsewhere. Marinelli also stated that taxes could be lowered enough so that "we may not need to have a state income tax anymore".

However, The Washington Post reported on February 18 that the Yes California campaign does not have exact policy positions, nor do they exactly know how a new independent California government would be set up: "The group's goal is to first have the state secede and then figure out how it should run".

In a January 2017 interview with The New York Times, businessman, philanthropist, and PayPal cofounder Peter Thiel endorsed Calexit, saying, "I think it would be good for California, good for the rest of the country. It would help [U.S. President] Trump's re-election campaign."

In July 2018, the objectives of the Calexit initiative were expanded upon by including a plan to carve out an "autonomous Native American nation" that would take up the eastern part of California, and "postponing its ballot referendum approach in favor of convincing Republican states to support their breakaway efforts."

=== By opponents ===
An op-ed piece published by the Los Angeles Times stated that California independence "would be a disaster for progressive values" because the U.S. Democratic Party would lose California's 55 electoral votes, its two U.S. senators and its delegation to the House of Representatives, and without California, Donald Trump would have won the popular vote of the 2016 presidential election: "For decades California has exerted more influence on American politics and culture than vice versa ... it would practically ensure that the rest of the U.S. would drift farther away from our laid-back tolerance and easygoing diversity ... if the United States minus California continues to do little or nothing to combat climate change, Californians — along with the rest of the world — will suffer."

In an editorial, the San Jose Mercury News called Calexit, "a colossally stupid idea ... [that] will start us down a costly, intellectually draining, dead-end path into a world of overwhelming unknowns". The editorial board of The San Diego Union-Tribune wrote that it is "a waste of time ... [that] reflects a defeatist attitude — that instead of fighting to shape this country's future, we should just quit. It also reflects a willingness to give up on America".

Los Angeles Mayor Eric Garcetti has stated that he opposes Calexit, saying, "I want to be a part of an America that continues to stand up for all of us, not bail on all our friends across the country."

Before the Yes California campaign withdrew their initial proposal, former Secretary of Defense Leon Panetta had warned KGO-TV about Russia's connections to Marinelli: "We're a big state. With a tremendous impact in terms of this country's economy and politics ... If you can weaken the leadership of the United States in the world, Russia can be able to get away with a lot more of what they want to do."

== Polling ==
Date(s) conducted	Polling organisation/client	Sample size	Margin of error	Support	Oppose	Undecided
Nov. 16, 2016	SurveyUSA	800	± 3.5%	23%	57%	20%
Jan. 5–7, 2017	Hoover/Stanford	1,700	± 3.8%	26%	56%	18%
Jan. 31, 2017	SurveyUSA	800	± 3.3%	18%	58%	16%
Mar. 13–20, 2017	UC Berkeley	1,000	± 3.6%	32%	68%	n/a
Jan. 7–9, 2018	Survey USA	1,000	± 2.7%	16%	71%	13%
Mar. 22–25, 2018	Survey USA	1,100	± 3%	14%	73%	13%

== See also ==
- Secession in the United States
- Partition and secession in California
- California Freedom Coalition
- California National Party
- Greater Idaho movement
