= Partition and secession in California =

Proposals to split the state or leave the US

California currently has 58 counties.

California, the most populous state in the United States and third largest in area after Alaska and Texas, has been the subject of more than 220 proposals to divide it into multiple states since its admission to the Union in 1850, including at least 27 significant proposals prior to the 21st century.

In addition, there have been some calls for the secession of multiple states or large regions in the American West (such as the proposal of Cascadia) which often include parts of Northern California.

== Prior California partitions ==
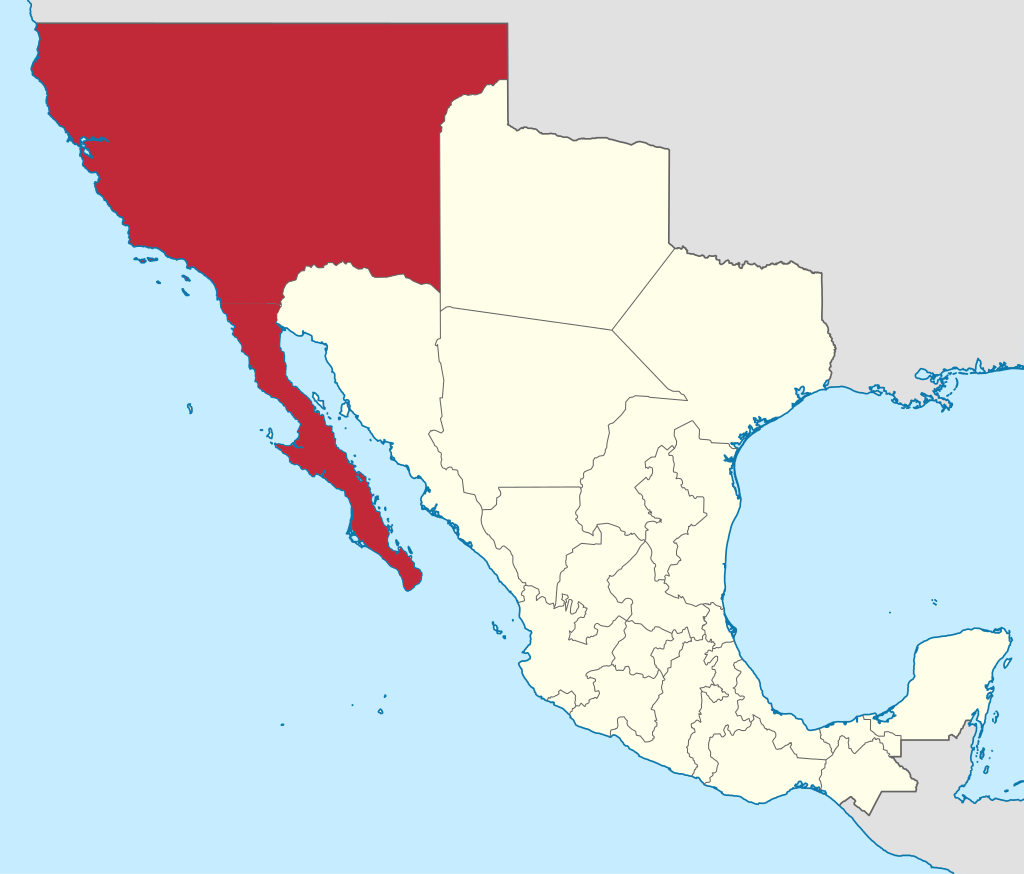
The original Province of Las Californias within the Viceroyalty of New Spain (1768–1804)

California was partitioned in its past, prior to its admission as a state in the United States. What under Spanish rule was called the Province of Las Californias (1768–1804), which occupied almost 2,000 miles (3,200 km) from north to south, was divided into Alta California (Upper California) and Baja California (Lower California) in 1804. The division occurred on a line separating the Franciscan missions in the north from the Dominican missions in the south, with Misión San Miguel Arcángel de la Frontera marking the northern limit of Baja California from the southern limit of Alta California.

After the Mexican–American War (1846–1848), most of Alta California was partitioned into five U.S. states, with the western portion of Alta California admitted to the United States as the present-day State of California. Later partitions of what had been Alta California became Nevada, Utah, and parts of Arizona and Wyoming. Baja California Territory would absorb what was left of Alta California (which included the modern-day cities of Tijuana and Mexicali) and remained under Mexican rule. Baja California was subsequently divided into two Mexican states in 1931. In 1888, under the government of President Porfirio Díaz, Baja California became a federally administered territory called the North Territory of Baja California ("north territory" because it was the northernmost territory in the Republic of Mexico). In 1952, the northern portion of this territory (above 28°N) became the 29th state of Mexico, called Baja California; the sparsely populated southern portion remained a federally administered territory. In 1974, it became the 31st state of Mexico, admitted as Baja California Sur.

== History of partition movements ==
=== Pre-statehood ===
The territory that became the present state of California was acquired by the U.S. as a result of American victory in the Mexican–American War and subsequent 1848 Mexican Cession. After the war, a confrontation erupted between the slave states of the South and the free states of the North regarding the status of these acquired territories. Among the disputes, the South wanted to extend the Missouri Compromise line (36°30' parallel north), and thus slave territory, west to Southern California and to the Pacific coast, while the North did not.

Starting in late 1848, Americans and foreigners of many different countries entered into California in unprecedented numbers, for the California Gold Rush, rapidly increasing the population. In response to growing demand for a better, more representative government, a Constitutional Convention was held in 1849. The delegates there unanimously outlawed slavery, and therefore had no interest in extending the Missouri Compromise Line through California; the lightly populated southern half had never had slavery and was heavily Hispanic. Delegates applied for statehood with the current boundaries. As part of the Compromise of 1850, Congressional representatives of the American South reluctantly acceded to having California be a free state, and it officially became the 31st state in the union on September 9, 1850.

=== Post-statehood ===
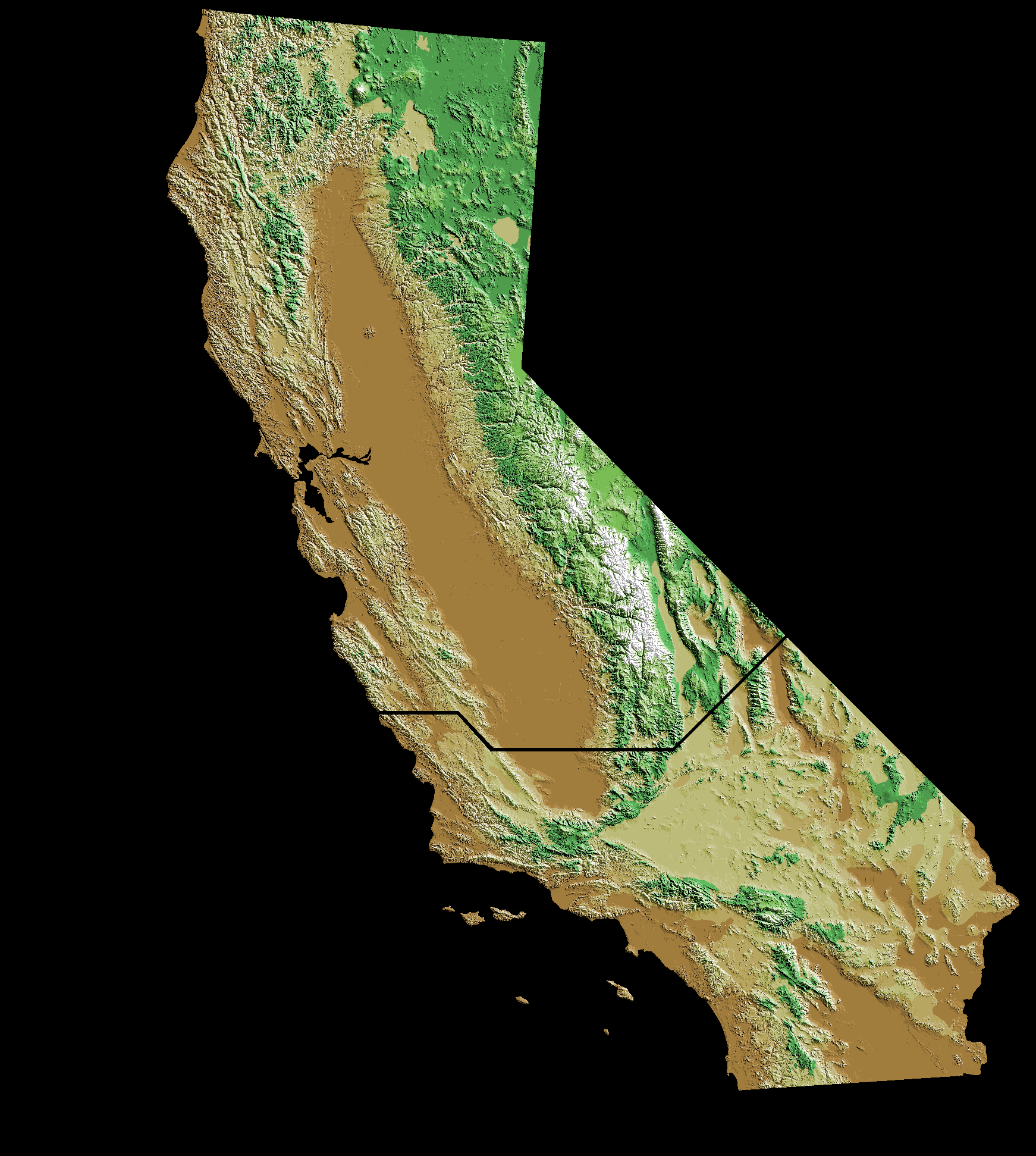
The Pico Act of 1859 proposed to divide California into two parts.

Southern California attempted several times in the 1850s to achieve a separate statehood or territorial status from Northern California.

In 1855, the California State Assembly passed a plan to trisect the state. All of the southern counties as far north as Monterey, Merced, and part of Mariposa, then sparsely populated but today containing about two-thirds of California's total population, would become the State of Colorado (the name Colorado was later adopted for another territory established in 1861), and the northern counties of Del Norte, Siskiyou, Modoc, Humboldt, Trinity, Shasta, Lassen, Tehama, Plumas, and portions of Butte, Colusa (which included what is now Glenn County), and Mendocino, a region which today has a population of less than a million, would become the State of Shasta. The primary reason was the size of the state's territory. At the time, the representation in Congress was too small for such a large territory, it seemed too extensive for one government, and the state capital was too inaccessible because of the distances to Southern California and various other areas. The bill eventually died in the California Senate as it became very low priority compared to other pressing political matters.

In 1859, the legislature and governor approved the Pico Act (named after the bill's sponsor Andrés Pico, state senator from Southern California) splitting off a portion of the state south of the 36th parallel north as the Territory of Colorado. The primary reason cited was the difference in both culture and geography between Northern and Southern California. Southern Californians had grown angry after paying taxes to the state without having any state projects underway in their lands. The bill was signed by the State governor John B. Weller, approved overwhelmingly by voters in the proposed Territory of Colorado, and sent to Washington, D.C., with a strong advocate in Senator Milton Latham. However, the secession crisis and American Civil War following the election of Abraham Lincoln in 1860 prevented the proposal from ever coming to a vote. The proposed border was described as follows:

...south of a line drawn eastward from the west boundary of the state along the sixth standard parallel south of the Mount Diablo meridian, east to the summit of the coast range; thence southerly following said summit to the seventh standard parallel; thence due east on said standard parallel to its intersection with the northwest border of Los Angeles county; thence northeast along said boundary to the eastern border of the state.

As drawn, this border was observed in 1907 by attorney Grant Jackson to contain a fatal flaw: it cut off from Angelenos the potentially valuable water supply from the Owens River in the Owens Valley, leaving it in the hands of northern Californians. This would have threatened the viability of the Los Angeles Aqueduct water project.

=== 20th century ===
State of Jefferson flag

- Since the mid-19th century, the mountainous region of northern California and parts of southwestern Oregon have been proposed as a separate state. In 1941, some counties in the area ceremonially seceded, one day a week, from their respective states as the State of Jefferson. This movement disappeared after America's entry into World War II, but the notion has been rekindled in recent years.
- The California State Senate voted on June 4, 1965, to divide California into two states, with the Tehachapi Mountains as the boundary. Sponsored by State Senator Richard J. Dolwig (R-San Mateo), the resolution proposed to separate the seven southern counties, with a majority of the state's population, from the 51 other counties, and passed 27–12. To be effective, the amendment would have needed approval by the State Assembly, by California voters, and by the United States Congress. As expected by Dolwig, the proposal did not get out of committee in the assembly.
- In 1992, State Assemblyman Stan Statham sponsored a bill to allow a referendum in each county on a partition into three new states: North, Central, and South California. The proposal passed in the State Assembly but died in the State Senate.

=== 21st century ===
2003: Martin Hutchinson's CaliFOURnia proposal
San Diego / Orange County / Imperial County / Inland Empire
Greater Los Angeles
San Francisco Bay Area / Sacramento/ Monterey
Northern / Central Valley

2009: Bill Maze's proposal
Coastal or Western California

2011: Jeff Stone's proposal
South California

2013: Tim Draper's Six Californias proposal
Jefferson
North California
Silicon Valley
Central California
West California
South California

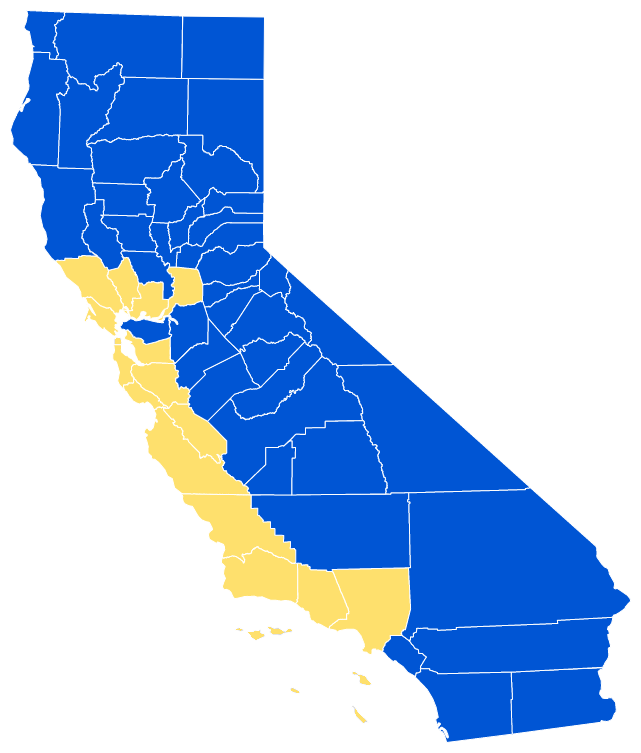
2018: Paul Preston's New California proposal
New California

2018: Tim Draper's Cal 3 proposal
Northern California
California
Southern California

2025: James Gallagher's "Two State Solution"
- In the wake of the 2003 gubernatorial recall, Tim Holt and Martin Hutchinson proposed in separate newspaper op-eds that the state should split into as many as four new states, dividing distinct geographically and politically defined regions as the Bay Area, North Coast, and Central Valley, as well as the historic Shasta/Jefferson region, into their own states.
- In early 2009, former State Assemblyman Bill Maze began lobbying to split thirteen coastal counties, which usually vote Democratic, into a separate state to be known as either "Coastal California" or "Western California". Maze's primary reason for wanting to split the state was because of how "conservatives don't have a voice" and how Los Angeles and San Francisco "control the state". The counties that would make up the new state would be Marin, Contra Costa, Alameda, San Francisco, San Mateo, Santa Clara, Santa Cruz, San Benito, Monterey, San Luis Obispo, Santa Barbara, Ventura, and Los Angeles Counties. It has also been proposed that the state be split in two simply at the straight divide of the 120th meridian west, much like its border with the state of Nevada.
- In June 2011, Republican Riverside County Supervisor Jeff Stone called for Riverside, Imperial, San Diego, Orange, San Bernardino, Kings, Kern, Fresno, Tulare, Inyo, Madera, Mariposa and Mono counties (see map, highlighted in red) to separate from California to form the new state of South California. Officials in Sacramento responded derisively, with governor Jerry Brown's spokesperson saying "A secessionist movement? What is this, 1860? It's a supremely ridiculous waste of everybody's time." and fellow supervisor Bob Buster calling Stone "crazy", suggesting "Stone has gotten too much sun recently."
- In September 2013, county supervisors in both Siskiyou County and Modoc County voted to join a bid to separate and create a new "State of Jefferson". Mark Baird, spokesperson for the Jefferson Declaration Committee, is reported to have said the group hopes to obtain commitments from as many as a dozen counties, after which they will ask the state legislature to permit formation of the new state based on Article 4, Section 3 of the US Constitution. In January 2014, supervisors in Glenn County voted in favor of separation, and in April 2014, Yuba County supervisors voted to become the fourth California county to join the movement. On June 3, 2014, residents in Del Norte County voted against separation by 58 percent to 42 percent; however, voters in Tehama County supported a separation initiative by 57 percent to 43 percent. On July 22, 2014, Sutter County voted 5–0 to join the State of Jefferson.
- Six Californias: On December 19, 2013, venture capitalist Tim Draper submitted a six-page proposal to the California Attorney General to split California into six new states, citing improved representation, governance, and competition between industries. On February 19, 2014, Secretary of State Debra Bowen approved the proposal allowing supporters to start collecting signatures in order to qualify the petition for a ballot. A total of 807,615 registered voters were needed by July 18, 2014, for the proposal to appear on the ballot. On July 14, the petition organizer announced that the proposal received enough signatures to be placed on the ballot in two years; however, it was determined that only about two thirds were valid and the petition fell short of qualifying for the November 2016 ballot.
- New California: On January 16, 2018, the 501(c)(4) organization New California, organized by conservative radio talk show host Paul Preston, published its proposed state's Declaration of Independence. As motivation for the split, Preston said that he rated California "around 48th or 50th" among states for business climate; he also mentioned what he said were high taxes. His proposed New California would have included the rural counties that make up most of the state's area, leaving the more heavily populated areas around San Francisco, Sacramento, and Los Angeles. New California would also include the urban areas of Contra Costa County, Orange County, and San Diego County, bringing the population to around 20 million. In December 2020, the proposed state filed an amicus brief in support of Texas in Texas v. Pennsylvania alongside New Nevada, claiming to be an aggrieved party due to the expansion of mail-in voting in California and alleged differences in voting rules between California counties.
- In April 2018, the Cal 3 organization announced it had more than 600,000 signatures to place an initiative on the November 2018 ballot proposing that California should be split into three separate states. The signatures must be verified before the proposal qualifies for the ballot - this was achieved by June 13, 2018. In July 2018, the California Supreme Court pulled the Cal 3 proposal from the ballot for further state constitutional review.
- In 2020, "Move Oregon's Border For a Greater Idaho" proposed breaking off most of Oregon's area and some of Northern California and join it with Idaho. The areas proposed to break off of Oregon and California vote Republican but in a state whose legislatures are dominated by Democrats. Douglas and Josephine counties in Oregon approved language for petitions to put a measure on the ballot. Even if passed by voters, it would still need approval from all three state legislatures.
- In August 2022, the San Bernardino County Board of Supervisors began an approval process for a possible secession measure to be added to the November 2022 general election ballot. Proponents of including the ballot measure cite dissatisfaction in the county's share of state and federal funding.
- In August 2025, Minority Leader of the California State Assembly James Gallagher introduced a “two-state solution” resolution to split the state in half to counter the Proposition 50 redistricting measure. The plan calls for the creation of a new state out of 35 interior counties of the state.

== Union with other states ==
=== Cascadia ===
While mostly consisting of Washington, Oregon, Idaho and British Columbia in Canada, proposals for an independent Cascadia often include portions of northern California.

=== Reunification with Baja California ===
The reunification of the Californias or Greater California is the irredentist idea of a united California often consisting of modern-day California, Baja California, and Baja California Sur, or largely based on the former lands previously governed by the Province of Las Californias (1767–1804), including much of the American Southwest.

There were fears during the Magonista rebellion of 1911 from both Americans and Mexicans of a Magonista expansion into California from, then Magonista-controlled, Baja California that would establish anarcho-communism across the Californias and inspire rebellions by Indigenous Californians against the US and Mexican governments.

== Independence movements ==
Prior to American annexation, there were two instance of Californian independence movements, first in 1836 when Juan Bautista Alvarado declared the independent Republic of Alta California, and then in 1846 when the Bear Flag Revolt declared the California Republic, during the Mexican–American War. After American annexation, there had been little to no independence movements prior to the Election of Donald Trump in 2016.

Numerous organizations advocate for the independence of California as a sovereign state. Common arguments in support of independence are often based on the fact of California having the fifth-largest economy in the world, and for being home to the global centers of entertainment (Hollywood) and technology (Silicon Valley).

=== Modern independence movements ===
==== California National Party ====
Founded in 2015, California National Party (CNP) is a political party seeking, as a long-term goal, the secession of California from the United States by legal and peaceful means. The name and mission of the California National Party are partly inspired by the Scottish National Party, a social democratic, civic nationalist, center-left party advocating progressivist policies and independence for Scotland.

==== California Freedom Coalition ====
The California Freedom Coalition is a political group, founded in 2017, advocating for the political, economic, and social empowerment of Californians. It supports universal healthcare for Californians, greater representation for California in the U.S. Congress, and more funding for education in California, as well as the possibility of California independence.

==== Yes California ====
In the wake of Republican nominee Donald Trump's winning the 2016 presidential election, a movement organized by Yes California referred to as "Calexit", a term inspired by the successful 2016 Brexit referendum, arose in a bid to gather the 585,407 signatures necessary to place a secessionist question on the 2018 ballot. In July 2018, the objectives of the Calexit initiative were expanded upon by including a plan to carve out an "autonomous Native American nation" that would take up the eastern part of California, and "postponing its ballot referendum approach in favor of convincing Republican states to support their breakaway efforts." "Yes California" was founded by Louis J. Marinelli.

== See also ==
- Secession in the United States
- List of U.S. state partition proposals
- Partition and secession in New York
- Texas divisionism
- Texas secession movements
- Bibliography of California history
