= Greater Idaho movement =

Initiative to transfer counties in eastern Oregon to Idaho

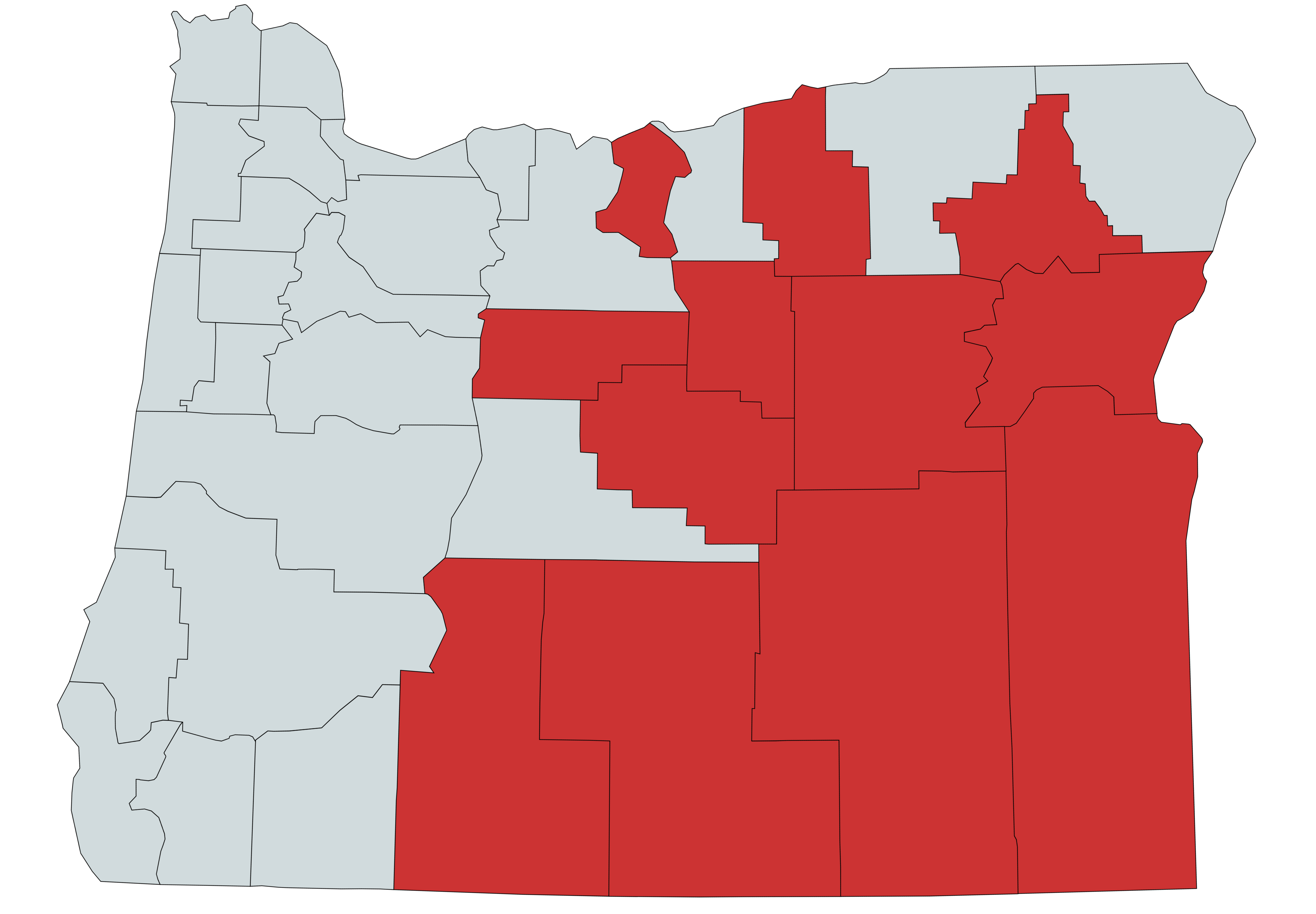
As of May 2026, twelve counties in Oregon (shown in red) had approved ballot measures in favor of Greater Idaho.

The Greater Idaho movement is an effort in the United States for counties east of the Oregon Cascades to secede from the state of Oregon and join Idaho. It is primarily led by conservative dissatisfaction with the liberal lean of the geographically small but more heavily populated northwestern region of Oregon, driven by the Portland area and other cities in the Willamette Valley; proponents argue that the rural eastern counties have more in common with Idaho, and are not adequately represented in Oregon's state politics.

For this change to be accomplished legally, it would first require approval by local voters via ballot measures, followed by approval from the state legislatures of both Oregon and Idaho, then final approval from the U.S Congress.

As of July 2024, thirteen counties in Oregon had approved ballot measures in favor of Greater Idaho, but Umatilla County, home to Hermiston, Pendleton, and 20% of the population that is proposed to join Idaho, has never had the issue reach the ballot. By May 2026, Wallowa County voters chose to rescind their previous support for the movement.

== Background and rationale ==
Results map of the 2022 Oregon gubernatorial election

Results map of the 2024 United States presidential election in Oregon

Eastern Oregon is relatively rural and conservative, compared to the more heavily populated and politically liberal north-western corner of Oregon. Those same north-western urban areas have a majority in the Oregon Legislative Assembly. Idaho is largely conservative compared to Oregon, motivating some conservatives in eastern Oregon to advocate for relocating the border. Oregon governor Tina Kotek acknowledged the movement in 2023 saying, "I think there are a lot of Oregonians who are frustrated and don’t feel heard. That, I think, is what the movement is about."

A number of state laws differ dramatically between Oregon and Idaho. Abortion access is starkly different, with Idaho banning nearly all abortions while Oregon imposes no legal restrictions. Tax policy is different, as Idaho charges a 6% sales tax, while Oregon does not impose a state sales tax. Oregon levies a progressive state income tax with one of the highest top rates in the U.S. at 9.9%. Minimum wage differs between the two states as well, with Idaho having the federal minimum wage of $7.25 and Oregon having an increased $14.70. Average yearly income in Idaho is $50,907, which is roughly $24 an hour while Oregon average income is $59,931 which is roughly $28.81 per hour. Drug laws differ, as like most of the West Coast, Oregon has legalized recreational marijuana, while Idaho still criminalizes possession. The Idaho state legislature opposes the rise of marijuana dispensaries in eastern Oregon serving customers from the Boise metro area; by moving the border further west, it would increase the travel time to the nearest dispensaries.

== Timeline ==
In 2020, the group called "Move Oregon's Border for a Greater Idaho" proposed that most of Oregon's area, as well as part of Northern California, be transferred to Idaho. In 2021, five counties in eastern Oregon voted to "require county officials to take steps to promote" adding the counties to Idaho. As of May 2024, thirteen counties in Oregon had approved ballot measures in favor of Greater Idaho: Baker, Crook, Grant, Harney, Jefferson, Klamath, Lake, Malheur, Morrow, Sherman, Union, Wallowa, and Wheeler.

In May 2022, voters in Douglas and Josephine counties rejected proposals to join, causing the proponents to scale back the scope of the proposal and issue a "less ambitious" map that excludes Southern Oregon west of Klamath County. The reduced scope includes only Oregon’s eastern territory save for small portions of Deschutes and Wasco counties. The latest map only covers about one third of the originally targeted areas.

In February 2023, the House State Affairs committee of the Idaho House of Representatives approved a resolution to authorize the legislature to discuss moving the state border with Oregon lawmakers. This was subsequently passed by the Idaho House of Representatives. A similar bill was introduced in the Oregon State Senate; Senate President Rob Wagner stated that it was unlikely that the bill would move forward in the 2023 session. In May 2023, Wallowa County approved a ballot measure in favor of Greater Idaho by just seven votes.

As of February 2024, Gilliam County and Umatilla County have yet to entertain the concept on the ballot.

On May 21, 2024, Crook County voted in favor of Measure 7-86 advising the Crook County Court that voters supported continued negotiations regarding relocating the Oregon–Idaho border to include Crook County within the Idaho border. This makes it the 13th county in Oregon that has passed a similar ballot measure resulting in the majority of Counties in the proposed Greater Idaho map having voted in favor. A measure repealing the Malheur County ordinance that requires Malheur County Court to meet three times a year on moving the Oregon–Idaho border was rejected in the November 2024 elections. In Baker County, where similar meetings on the Oregon-Idaho border are held every year, a measure allowing the commissioners to hold meetings only when deemed necessary was also rejected.

On May 19, 2026, voters in Wallowa County chose 61% to 39% to end the requirement that the Wallowa County board of commissioners meet twice per year to discuss moving Idaho's border.

Countywide votes in Oregon to secede and join Idaho
Date	County	Support		Oppose		Total	Ballot measure	Ref.
Date	County	No.	%	No.	%	No.	Ballot measure	Ref.
November 3, 2020	Douglas	26,981	43.32%	35,297	56.68%	63,278	10-180	
November 3, 2020	Jefferson	5,757	50.90%	5,553	49.10%	11,310	16-96	
November 3, 2020	Union	7,435	52.40%	6,753	47.60%	14,188	31-101	
November 3, 2020	Wallowa	2,478	49.59%	2,519	50.41%	4,997	32-003	
May 18, 2021	Baker	3,346	57.49%	2,474	42.51%	5,820	1-104	
May 18, 2021	Grant	1,471	62.15%	896	37.85%	2,367	12-77	
May 18, 2021	Lake	1,510	74.64%	513	25.36%	2,023	19-35	
May 18, 2021	Malheur	3,059	54.13%	2,592	45.87%	5,651	23-64	
May 18, 2021	Sherman	430	62.32%	260	37.68%	690	28-46	
November 2, 2021	Harney	1,583	63.22%	921	36.78%	2,504	13-18	
May 17, 2022	Douglas	16,791	47.37%	18,659	52.63%	35,450	10-185	
May 17, 2022	Josephine	13,619	48.70%	14,344	51.30%	27,963	17-106	
May 17, 2022	Klamath	9,649	57.00%	7,278	43.00%	16,927	18-121	
November 8, 2022	Morrow	2,386	60.7%	1,546	39.3%	3,932	25-88	
November 8, 2022	Wheeler	472	58.56%	334	41.44%	806	35-29	
May 16, 2023	Wallowa	1,752	50.10%	1,745	49.90%	3,497	32-007	
May 21, 2024	Crook	5,086	53.44%	4,432	46.56%	9,518	7-86	
May 19, 2026	Wallowa	1,319	39.22%	2,044	60.78%	3,363	32-011	

== See also ==
- Secession in the United States
- Jefferson (proposed Pacific state)
- Lincoln (proposed Northwestern state)
- Cascadia movement
- Separation referendums in Illinois
- List of U.S. state partition proposals
