= California National Party =

Progressive California nationalist party

California National Party Partido Nacional de California
- Abbreviation: CNP
- Founded: 2015; 11 years ago
- Headquarters: Sacramento, California
- Registered voters (January 2022): 413
- Ideology: Californian sovereignty‌ Progressivism (US); Environmentalism
- Political position: Center-left
- Colours: Gold; Blue
- Seats in the U.S. Senate: 0 / 2
- Seats in the U.S. House: 0 / 52
- Statewide executive offices: 0 / 8
- Seats in the State Senate: 0 / 40
- Seats in the State Assembly: 0 / 80

Website
- www.californianational.party

The California National Party (CNP; Spanish: Partido Nacional de California) is a progressive and secessionist political party in the United States. CNP operates within California and supports Californian sovereignty. CNP formed in 2015.

CNP's name and purpose are partly inspired by the Scottish National Party, a social democratic, civic nationalist, center-left party that advocates independence for Scotland.

CNP was registered with the California Fair Political Practices Commission, California's equivalent of the Federal Election Commission, in 2019 but not in 2021 or 2023.

== Membership ==
In January 2022, CNP had 413 registered voters in California. After April 2022, the Secretary of State no longer listed the CNP in its voter tallies. To achieve qualified party status, the CNP would need 0.33% of total registered voters, or about 73,000. In May 2022, CNP claimed "a few thousand people" on its email list.

== History ==
CNP was created in August 2015, with the intent of creating a political platform centered on California's needs and Californian identity. CNP filed intent to qualify as a political party on December 7, 2015. The Secretary of State approved this, assigned the code "CNP", and notified county offices of this on January 6, 2016.

CNP held its first convention in June 2016 in Sacramento, California. CNP elected Theo Slater as chair, Andria Franco as Vice Chair, and Jed Wheeler (founder of Californians for Independence) as Secretary. In September 2016, CNP merged with Californians for Independence (CfI) and adopted a new platform, based on the CfI platform.

CNP has distanced itself from Yes California and its founder Louis J. Marinelli and its "Calexit", for its ideology and for its alleged connections to Russia. Jed Wheeler, CNP Secretary, stated to Politico that "Yes California is a movement whose optics are all designed for a Russian audience to reinforce Putin" and stressed that CNP is a progressive party.

== Ideology ==
CNP's "core values" are "building and defending California", "fact-based, compassionate policy", "individual rights and social responsibility", "locally-focused political empowerment", and "prosperity for all Californians" CNP supports greater powers and funding control for local government in California.

== Election results ==
CNP has fielded electoral candidates for local and state offices. CNP candidates run on the CNP ballot line, rather than as independents or on the Green ballot line.

No CNP candidate has yet won an election.

=== Statewide elections ===
Year	Candidate	Office	State	District	Votes	%	Result	Notes	Ref
2021	Michael Loebs	Governor	California	At-Large	25,468	0.35%	Lost	recall election	
2018	Gayle McLaughlin	Lieutenant Governor	California	At-Large	263,364	4.0%	Lost	ran as No Party Preference (NPP) candidate; founder of Richmond Progressive Alliance (RPA); endorsed by CNP, DSA, GPCA, OR, PFP, PP, and RPA	

=== Local elections ===
Year	Candidate	Office	City	District	Votes	%	Result	Notes	Ref
2024	Ash Seiter	Board of Supervisors	Inyo County	5th	159	15.16%	Lost	nonpartisan election	
2022	Aaron Reveles	School Board	Montebello	At-Large	7,020	14.17%	Lost	nonpartisan election	
2022	Carlos Ovalle	City Council	Long Beach	7	1,770	30.6%	Lost	nonpartisan election	
2022	Steven Estrada	City Council	Long Beach	1	441	8.5%	Lost	nonpartisan election	
2020	Scott Schmidt	Los Rios Community College District Trustee	Sacramento	7th	37,476	37%	Lost	nonpartisan election	
2018	Micheál O’Leary	Board of Equalization	Los Angeles	3rd	43,084	3.4%	Lost	all-party blanket primary, did not advance to general; ran as Independent	

== See also ==
- Secession in the United States
- Partition and secession in California
- California Freedom Coalition
- Yes California
- American Left
- History of the socialist movement in the United States
- Democratic Socialists of America
- Green Party of the United States
