= Submissionist =

Civil War Era Insult

Submissionist was a derogatory term used by Southern secessionists in the year preceding the American Civil War to describe Southerners who wanted to preserve the Union. Before 1861, Southerners loyal to the Union were generally respected as principled idealists. As Southern states began to actually secede, however, those who had seceded viewed Southerners who remained Unionists as cowardly and lacking the strength to stand up for their own rights. Following the Secession Crisis, popular sentiment in the Deep South held that the North was unwilling to compromise with the South. The Deep South would rather secede from the Union than relinquish sovereignty. Consequently, "submissionist" was a derogatory name for a Southerner who would seemingly relinquish sovereignty in order to remain in the Union.

The term was used also to describe a particular kind of cooperationist, that is, those who were generally opposed to secession; Louisiana politician Pierre Soulé, for instance, a cooperationist, protested that he was "no submissionist" and would choose revolution (i.e., secession) rather than ignominy. Thomas T. Gantt, however, Provost Marshal General of the District of Missouri, proudly called himself a submissionist at the Missouri State Convention on March 15, 1861. Edmund Ruffin, who is credited with firing the first shot at the Battle of Fort Sumter, noted in his diary, September 3, 1861, "As a general rule, the Submissionist party embraces, & is largely composed of, the old, the timid, the cowardly, the imbecile & the mean-spirited."

== See also ==
- Southern Unionist
