= Texas divisionism =

Historical movement to divide Texas into several states

Texas divisionism refers to historical and contemporary movements advocating for the division of the State of Texas into as many as five states; a provision included in the resolution admitting the former Republic of Texas into the Union in 1845.

The concept originates from the conditions of Texas's annexation by the United States in 1845, which included a provision allowing for the potential creation of up to five states from its territory. Throughout the 19th century, various proposals were made to divide Texas for political, administrative, or economic reasons, though none succeeded. While serious efforts waned in the 20th century, the idea has occasionally resurfaced in modern political discourse. However, any actual division of Texas would require approval by both the Texas Legislature and the United States Congress; making such a change highly unlikely under current political conditions.

== Historical background ==
When Texas was annexed into the United States in 1845, the Joint Resolution of Annexation explicitly permitted Texas to be divided into as many as five states without requiring a constitutional amendment. Early in Texas's statehood, several proposals emerged to subdivide the territory, driven by the challenges of governing such a vast area and differing regional interests. For example, in the 1850s, some politicians from East Texas, which was more closely aligned with the Old South, advocated for separation from the western frontier regions.

During the Civil War, Confederate leaders occasionally discussed reconfiguring state boundaries in the South, including Texas, to strengthen the Confederacy's hold over the region. However, no division plans materialized during or after.

== Federal constitutional process ==
Article IV, Section 3, of the United States Constitution expressly prohibits any other state from dividing up and forming smaller states without congressional approval. The section states "New states may be admitted by the Congress into this union; but no new states shall be formed or erected within the jurisdiction of any other state; nor any state be formed by the junction of two or more states, or parts of states, without the consent of the legislatures of the states concerned as well as of the Congress."

The Joint Resolution for Annexing Texas to the United States, approved by Congress on March 1, 1845, states:

Third – New States of convenient size not exceeding four in number, in addition to said State of Texas and having sufficient population, may, hereafter by the consent of said State, be formed out of the territory thereof, which shall be entitled to admission under the provisions of the Federal Constitution; and such states as may be formed out of the territory lying south of thirty-six degrees thirty minutes north latitude, commonly known as the Missouri Compromise Line, shall be admitted into the Union, with or without slavery, as the people of each State, asking admission shall desire; and in such State or States as shall be formed out of said territory, north of said Missouri Compromise Line, slavery, or involuntary servitude (except for crime) shall be prohibited.

Proponents of the right of Texas to divide itself to create new states without congressional approval argue that the resolution of 1845, a bill which passed both houses of Congress, stands as congressional "pre-approval" under the terms of the Constitution for formation of such new states. That interpretation of the statute is disputed by opponents.

Opponents of this proposal argue that there was no such "pre-approval" granted to Texas by Congress within the statute and that the Constitution requires future congressional approval of any new states that are proposed to be formed from what is now the state of Texas. According to opponents, the statute does not grant Texas any congressional "pre-approval" for partition, but the statute simply limits the number of new states that could be carved out of the annexed Texas territory to four.

Opponents also argue that the statute has also been overridden and rendered moot by later legislation that was enacted by Congress, the Act which admitted Texas into the Union as a state. The text of the subsequent Texas Admission Act, signed on 29 December 1845, states that Texas would be admitted to the Union "on an equal footing with the original States in all respects whatever," which moots any supposed special right for Texas to divide itself up into five states without the future approval of Congress in accordance to Article V, Section 3, of the US Constitution.

Texas divisionists argue that the division of their state could be desirable because, as the second-largest state in the United States in both area and population, Texas is too large to be governed efficiently as one political unit or that in several states, Texans would gain more power at the federal level, particularly in the U.S. Senate since each state elects two senators, and by extension in the Electoral College in which each state gets two electoral votes for their senators in addition to an electoral vote for each representative. However, others argue that division may be wastefully duplicative by requiring a new state government for each new state.

== Legislative efforts ==
The division of the state of Texas was frequently proposed in the early decades of Texan statehood, particularly in the decades immediately prior to and following the American Civil War.

=== Compromise of 1850 debates ===
Proposals for Texas boundaries in 1850

In the Compromise of 1850 debates, Tennessee Senator John Bell proposed division into two southern states, with the assent of Texas, in February 1850. New Mexico would get all Texas land north of the 34th parallel north, including today's Texas Panhandle, while the area to the south, including the southeastern part of today's New Mexico, would be divided at the Colorado River of Texas into two Southern states, balancing the admission of California and New Mexico as free states.

=== State of Lincoln ===
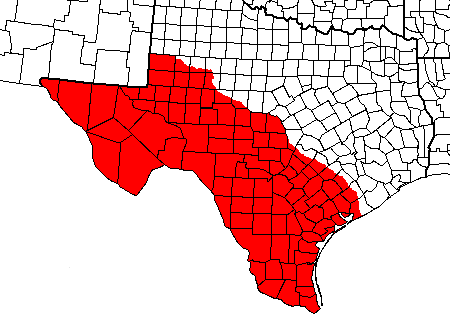
The boundaries of the State of Lincoln overlaying present-day Texas counties

The State of Lincoln was proposed in 1869, to be carved out of the territory of Texas from the area south and west of the state's Colorado River. Unlike many other Texas division proposals of the Reconstruction period, this one, named after Abraham Lincoln, was presented to Congress, but the state legislature did not take final action.

=== State of Jefferson ===
The proposed State of Jefferson would have been a new state formed by one of two plans for the division of the State of Texas. The bill that annexed the Republic of Texas to the United States in 1845 allowed up to four new States, in addition to the State of Texas, to be formed out of the territory of the former Republic of Texas. This was due to the fact that Texas was the largest state in the Union at the time and in belief that the population would be shared equally between the planned states. With a few division plans drawn up before the Civil War, Reconstruction brought carpetbaggers that sought the additional government positions that the division of Texas would provide. So the readmittance Constitutional Convention led to five plans being introduced and additional plans of division lines. In the end, the Convention adopted no plan.

==== 1870 ====
With no plan from the Texas Convention, a Congressional plan was drafted to create a State of Lincoln from Texas. This plan never made it out of the committee. Instead, the Howard Bill was introduced calling for two territories and future states, Jefferson and Matagorda, to be formed from Texas. Texas east of the San Antonio River was designated as Jefferson. The rump Texas would then be admitted under Reconstruction plans. The new territories would join when they were considered able to function as states. A competing plan from the state in 1871 proposed a north, east, south, and west division. Neither legislature made final approval of either plan.

The "division of the state" issue continued over the years with an additional plan in 1906.

==== 1915 ====
With no reapportionment of representatives following the thirteenth U.S. Census, discussion of the division question was renewed in 1914. Proponents believed that, as the western part of Texas had grown in population, it should thus have gotten more representation, but this was dismissed by the legislature. Hardly any state institutions were in the western part of the state. In the Texas Senate, a proposed State of Jefferson was introduced, to be formed from the twenty-fifth, twenty-sixth, twenty-eighth, and twenty-ninth state senate districts. With only six senators supporting the bill, it failed.

Support grew for the State of Jefferson in 1921 with the governor's veto over an agricultural and mechanical college to be located in West Texas. While no bill was proposed, west Texas held a popular meeting over the matter, but support quickly declined.

=== Texlahoma ===
In 1935, in response to what proponents felt was lack of state attention to road infrastructure, A. P. Sights proposed that 46 northern Texas counties and 23 western Oklahoma counties secede to form a new, roughly rectangular state called Texlahoma.

=== Legal and Constitutional Considerations ===
In 2009, Nate Silver wrote an article covering the topic of dividing Texas. He argued that a division could slightly help Republicans in the Senate while slightly hurting them in the Electoral College, ultimately concluding that there was not much rationale for either political party to support such a division. Modern scholars note that even if Texas attempted division, numerous constitutional and logistical hurdles would stand in the way, including how to divide public debts, allocate resources, and reorganize major infrastructure (Texas Law Review, Federalism Articles).

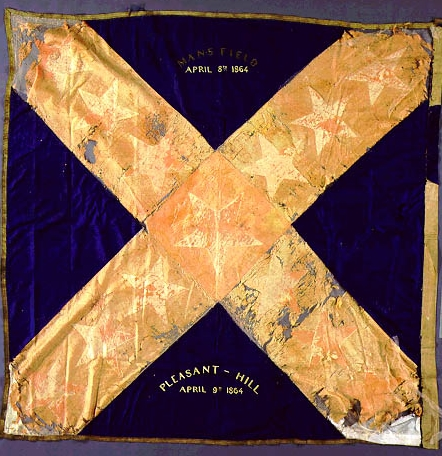
Walker's Texas Division's battle flag, carried by a Texas unit, represents both military history and complex symbolism. To some, it evokes the memory of their ancestors and soldiers who fought for the South in the Civil War. To others, it represents slavery, segregation, and hatred.

In a 2019 Yale lecture series called "Power and Politics in Today's World", Professor Ian Shapiro argues that splitting both Texas and California into two states each is an effective way of solving the disproportionate influence of the two biggest states in the electoral college to facilitate a more proportional state-wide representation.

== Criticism and challenges ==
Critics of divisionism point out that breaking up Texas could potentially fragment a variety of industries from a statewide regulatory framework. Furthermore, it could also create disputes over shared resources such as the Ogallala Aquifer and the ERCOT electric grid.

In addition, national political implications - particularly regarding the prospective states' Senate seats and electoral votes - would likely make Congress cautious about approving any new states emerging from Texas. Pew Research Center studies on American political polarization (2014) suggest that division might further deepen partisan divides at the national level. Despite regional tensions, there is no strong, sustained public movement within Texas today demanding formal division.

== See also ==
- Partition and secession in California
- Texas Secession movements
- Annexation of Texas
