= Joseph Rodota =

America writer and political consultant

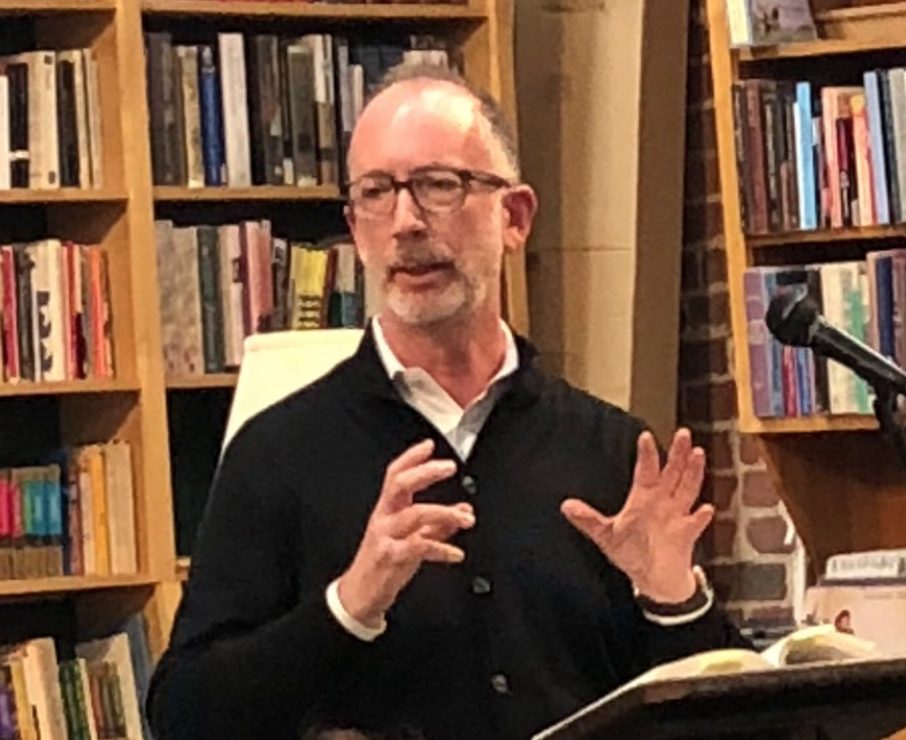
Joseph Rodota presenting on his work, The Watergate, at Time Tested Books in Sacramento, California, March 2018.

Joseph Rodota (born January 13, 1960) is an American writer and political consultant.

== Early life ==
Rodota was born in San Rafael, California and grew up in Santa Rosa, California. He attended Stanford University, graduated with a degree in history, with honors and distinction. He was a columnist for the Stanford Daily newspaper. While an undergraduate, Rodota worked part-time at the Hoover Institution, as a research assistant to Nobel economist George J. Stigler.

== Author and playwright ==
Rodota's first book, The Watergate: Inside America's Most Infamous Address, was published in 2018 by William Morrow. The book, the first comprehensive history of the iconic Watergate complex in Washington, D.C., revealed new information about the origins of the Watergate name; the demise of the Watergate developer, Società Generale Immobiliare; and Ronald Reagan's investment in the complex, as a shareholder in a real estate investment trust that was acquired in 1979 by the pension funds of the British Coal Board. The Watergate was selected as a book of the month by The Wall Street Journal.

He is the author of Chessman, a play about the final days of the "Red Light Bandit" Caryl Chessman, who was executed in 1960 in California. The play received a production at Sacramento's B Street Theatre in 2016.

== Political career ==
After graduation from Stanford University, Rodota was an intern in the Washington office of U.S. Rep. Donald H. Clausen and then joined the staff of the U.S. Senate Republican Policy Committee, chaired by Sen. John Tower. Rodota then went to the U.S. Department of Education, as a special assistant to the Assistant Secretary of Legislative Affairs. Following the 1984 election, Rodota worked briefly in the U.S. Departments of Housing and Urban Development and the U.S. Department of Energy, before being named deputy director of public affairs in the White House, where he served until 1988. He was director of policy for the Bush-Quayle '88 California campaign, the last election in which a Republican presidential nominee carried the popular vote in California.

Rodota was a consultant to the 1990 campaign of Pete Wilson, who defeated Dianne Feinstein to become Governor of California. In early 1993, Rodota was named Cabinet Secretary to Governor Wilson, responsible for coordinating policy and administrative activities of the 11 cabinet agencies and the Washington, DC office of the State of California. After Wilson's reelection in 1994, Rodota was named Deputy Chief of Staff. Within days after Arnold Schwarzenegger announced on the Jay Leno Show that he intended to run for Governor of California, Rodota was named director of policy for the campaign. He ran a policy development team that later became known as Schwarzenegger University. He served as a Schwarzenegger appointee to the Little Hoover Commission and as a consultant to Schwarzenegger's 2006 reelection campaign.

In 2008, Rodota was one of a small number of bipartisan political operatives who volunteered in the closing days on the campaign against Prop. 8, the California initiative banning same-sex marriage. Rodota set up and ran the campaign's "war room" and rapid-response efforts. Rodota later joined the Mehlman brief in support of gay marriage in Obergefell v. Hodges.

Rodota was also an advisor in 2008 to Kevin Johnson's successful campaign for mayor of Sacramento.

Rodota was co-manager, with California Democratic consultant Steven Maviglio, of OneCalifornia, a committee opposed to proposals by Silicon Valley venture capitalist Tim Draper to divide California into Six Californias, later modified to three states in a measure named Cal 3. Neither proposal made it onto the statewide California ballot.

The walking trail and bicycle path Joe Rodota Trail in Sonoma County is named after his father. Rodota was the first person to bike on the trail.

== Opposition research ==
Rodota was one of the first political consultants to specialize in opposition research. He was a senior analyst at the Opposition Research Group of the Republican National Committee, where he was a writer and editor of Vice President Malaise, a paperback book about the Democratic nominee for president, Walter F. Mondale.

== Consulting career ==
As chief executive officer and founder of Forward Observer, Inc., Rodota has worked on a number of high-profile ballot initiative campaigns, including Proposition 14, which established California's top-two primary system (support) and Proposition 23, which would have suspended AB 32 under certain circumstances (oppose).

He was also a key figure in the effort to against a proposed toll road that would impact San Onofre State Park and adjacent Trestles Beach, and an advisor to the successful campaign to ban plastic bags in California. In a 2014 report, Greenwire described him as "a GOP strategist who crafts winning messages for greens."

== Personal ==
He is a member of the board of directors of the Christopher Isherwood Foundation in Santa Monica, California, and a former trustee of the Crocker Museum of Art in Sacramento, California. He is the co-founder of Sakuramento, an organization dedicated to celebrating Sacramento's connection to Japan through nature, food and community. Rodota is an Artist Ambassador to the National New Play Network, representing B Street Theatre.

He lives in Sacramento, California.

== Works ==
- The Watergate: Inside America's Most Infamous Address (William Morrow).
- Chessman (subscription required)
