= Gabor Acs =

Hungarian-born architect (born 1926)

Gábor Ács (born 21 December 1926) is a Hungarian-born architect who was active primarily between 1953 and 1990. He worked early in his career with the noted architect I. M. Pei, and was the chief architect for the Italian international real estate developer Società Generale Immobiliare (for whom he helped to successfully build the Watergate complex in the United States).

== Personal information ==
Gábor Ács was born in Budapest, Kingdom of Hungary (1920-44), on 21 December 1926. He enrolled at the Faculty of Architecture-Engineering at the University of Technology of Budapest, graduating in 1948. When the military forces of the Soviet Union occupied Hungary after World War II, his father took his family to Italy, where they settled in Rome. Ács enrolled at the Politecnico di Milano, graduating in 1953 with a degree in architecture.

Ács currently lives in Rome with his wife, Armelle.

== Professional career ==
After obtaining his degree in architecture, Ács, in 1956, traveled to the United States and became a practicing architect. He joined I.M. Pei's firm in 1956, working as the design architect for the Kips Bay Plaza and Washington Square East. He became partner in "I. M. Pei and Partners." working with Henry N. Cobb. In 1963, he came back Italy and established an office on the Piazza Navona in Rome, where he has developed projects in more than 15 nations around the world. He became the chief architect for the Italian real estate developer Società Generale Immobiliare (SGI). In May 1962, he and Luigi Moretti successfully defended the Watergate complex's design in a special three-hour meeting with the members of the United States Commission of Fine Arts: SGI's chief architect, Gabor Acs, with professor Luigi Moretti of the University of Rome flew to New York City to defend their designs. In the end, SGI was allowed to build 25 percent of the complex to 13 stories.

Moretti, who had designed the Montreal Stock Exchange and Rome's Olympic Village for the 1960 Olympic Games, served as a consulting architect.

Read more: Watergate: The name that branded more than a building | Washington Business Journal

His many projects and commissions include:

- The Port Royal residential tower (1963) in Montreal, Quebec, Canada
- The Victoria Place business center (1964) in Montreal (with Luigi Moretti and Pier Luigi Nervi
- The Pan Am Building (1966) in Paris, France
- Residential towers (1967) in Mexico City, Mexico
- The French Red Cross headquarters (1968) on the Rue de Berry, Paris
- The Sperlinga Villa residential building (1969) in Palermo, Italy
- The Mirabeau hotel and residential tower in Monaco
- The headquarters of Toyota (1979) in Jeddah, Saudi Arabia
- A three-tower office complex and pedestrian plaza (1980) in the Fiera District in Bologna, Italy (with Kenzo Tange)
- The National Center for Civil Defense in Rome
