= Crowds on Demand =

American publicity firm

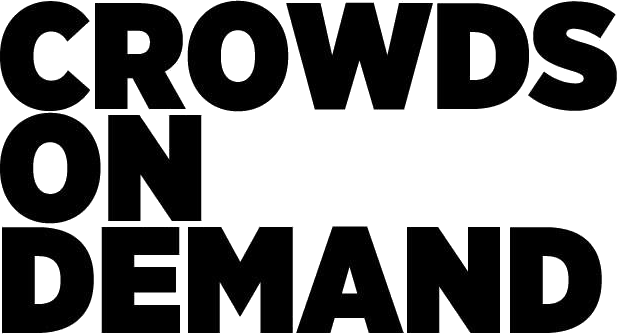
- Founder: Adam Swart
- Headquarters: Los Angeles, California
- Area served: United States
- Services: publicity, public relations
- Owner: Adam Swart
- Website: crowdsondemand.com

Crowds on Demand is an American publicity firm that provides clients with hired actors to pose as fans, paparazzi, security guards, unpaid protesters and professional paid protesters. The company operates in Los Angeles, San Francisco, Las Vegas, New York City, Washington, D.C., Iowa, Dallas, and New Hampshire. The firm was founded in October 2012 by Adam Swart.

== History ==
Crowds on Demand was founded by Adam Swart, a former journalist for AOL's Patch network. The company initially gained attention for offering "celebrity experience" services such as fake paparazzi and hired fans, primarily in Los Angeles. Over time, its offerings expanded to include organized protests, political demonstrations, and publicity stunts involving paid actors posing as members of the public.

The firm's services were the subject of a Good Morning America piece in which a correspondent pretended to be the “King of Liechtenstein” (despite that country’s monarch actually being titled “Prince”) while he went through a shopping mall with a paid entourage.

Just before the November 2012 election, company founder Swart said that the company was considering a request by a candidate for a staged political protest. According to an article in the New York Post, it was claimed that Anthony Weiner paid Crowds on Demand actors to attend campaign rallies during his 2013 campaign for mayor of New York City. Weiner has disputed the story and claimed it was fabricated.

In 2024, the Texas Observer reported that hotelier and Republican political donor Monty Bennett hired Crowds on Demand to create a network of advocacy groups in Dallas, Texas to influence local politics. One of those groups, Dallas Justice Now, was a hoax local Black Lives Matter organization that drew national controversy in 2021 for sending letters urging wealthy white families to not send their children to Ivy League universities. A pro-police group, Keep Dallas Safe, was found to have used the same Republican marketing firm as Dallas Justice Now in 2021, initially denied any connection to Dallas Justice Now, and was revealed to be a Crowds on Demand project in 2024.

== Criticism ==
Crowds on Demand has come under criticism for selling the pretense of fame and popularity. Elizabeth Currid-Halkett, an associate professor at the University of Southern California Sol Price School of Public Policy, criticized the company for deceiving the public.

A Washington Post columnist mentioned an e-mail he received advertising the company's "Celebrity Arrival Service" offered to politicians:

I received an e-mail the other day from Crowds on Demand, an L.A.-based company that, for a fee, will send a bunch of "team members" to your event, stuffing the crowd with confederates to make you look important.

The service has been characterized as astroturfing. Dan Schneider, writing for The Atlantic, said "There might be some gray area between offering a small token of appreciation to otherwise voluntary supporters and full-blown astroturfing, but spending hundreds or even thousands of dollars to prop up a struggling cause seems to fit more squarely in the latter category." Schneider also noted that Swart admitted "a revelation that a campaign is paying for supporters is deeply embarrassing, and he takes great pains to keep his clients’ identities a secret."

According to a February 2016 report for NBC Los Angeles, a paid protester claimed to be "a concerned citizen" when speaking out against a planned development in a city council meeting for Camarillo, California in 2015. He later stated to reporters that his role "was scripted, they told me what to say." Swart claimed the company has "worked with dozens of campaigns for state officials, and 2016 presidential candidates" but declined to identify his clients for fear of losing future business. Public records identified only one campaign, for the Six Californias, had paid Crowds on Demand.

In May 2018, the outfit made New Orleans news as word got out that energy firm Entergy had used "astroturfing" tactics—paid actors—to speak at a March city council hearing in support of a proposed controversial natural gas power plant, and in opposition to solar and wind power.

In August 2018, Crowds on Demand was included in an episode of Last Week Tonight with John Oliver about astroturfing.

In October 2018, Zdeněk Bakala filed suit in federal court in South Carolina, alleging Crowds on Demand attempted to extort millions of dollars from him.

== See also ==
- Extra (acting)
- Rental family – A service to provide actors to play family, friends, or coworkers, primarily in Japan
