= Joe Rodota Trail =

Paved rail trail in Sonoma County, California

- Length: 8.5 miles (13.7 km)
- Location: Sonoma County, California, United States
- Surface: paved

The Joe Rodota Trail is a 8.5-mile (13.7 km) paved rail trail in Sonoma County, California that spans from near the intersection of Mill Station Road and Highway 116 in Sebastopol to the area of West 3rd Street and Roberts Avenue in Santa Rosa. The trail provides a safety separation for pedestrians and bicycles from motor vehicle traffic on the parallel California State Route 12/Luther Burbank Memorial Highway.

The trail has hosted a homeless encampment that grew exponentially in the late 2010s. The encampment was a topic of concern for residents and politicians, resulting in elected officials approving $12 million for housing units. In January 2020, the encampment was dispersed and some of its campers and inhabitants relocated to other areas in Santa Rosa or Sonoma County.

== History ==
The trail was built on the former roadbed of the Petaluma and Santa Rosa Railroad built in 1904 to provide interurban service from a ferry connection in Petaluma through Sebastopol to Santa Rosa. The line was purchased by the Northwestern Pacific Railroad in 1932. The right-of-way was converted to a walking and bicycle path by the Sonoma County Regional Parks Department after declining freight traffic caused abandonment of rail service over the route in the 1980s. The trail is named after Joseph “Joe” Rodota, Sr, father of writer and political consultant Joseph Rodota, Jr.; Rodota, Sr. was the county's district's first director.

== Homeless encampment ==
As of December 2019, the encampment had encompassed over one mile of the trail and had over 220 homeless inhabitants, which steadily increased over the several months prior. An article from the San Francisco Chronicle put an estimation of 300 homeless residents, which accounted for approximately ten percent of Sonoma County's homeless population at the time. A 150-resident homeless encampment, located one mile (1.6 km) away behind a Dollar Tree on Sebastopol Road in Santa Rosa, was dismantled in August 2018, and a lawsuit was filed over the teardown of that camp which resulted in a federal court injunction preventing officials from taking matter over homeless camps unless they had shelter and storage for campers’ personal belongings. Sixty percent of the people from that encampment relocated to the Joe Rodota Trail encampment. Incidents such as fires and arson took place in the encampment three times in a span of two months from November 2019 to January 2020, including a tank explosion on New Year's Eve 2019. A county supervisor voiced concern that the campsite had steered away many would-be trail pedestrians and cyclists, and had become a nuisance for people who live in the neighborhood.

The Sonoma County Board of Supervisors approved a plan to provide housing for some of the homeless campers, in a $11.63 million leasing that will provide at least six units for at least twenty people. The county will spend up to $5 million to buy six multi-bedroom houses that could shelter 60 people, $3.2 million to hire seven new staffers and fund contracts for drug treatment beds and medical support, and $750,000 into annual leases of six to seven units to serve another 20 residents. In January 2020, the encampment was dismantled by local authorities, and some of its inhabitants moved elsewhere locally, including a homeless community in Oakmont.

In 2024, officials erased an unofficial memorial to homeless people who had died in Sonoma County which was painted on rocks at the site where the encampment used to be encampment by a former resident, who was threatened with arrest when trying to seek a compromise with police and parks employees.
