= Monty Bennett =

American businessman

- Born: 1964 or 1965 (age 61–62)
- Education: Cornell University (BS, MBA)
- Occupation: Business executive
- Employer: Ashford Inc.
- Title: Chairman and chief executive officer

Monty J. Bennett (born 1964 or 1965) is an American businessman who founded and is the chairman and CEO of Ashford Inc., a hospitality real estate company. He is also the publisher of the Dallas Express, (Note: Unrelated to the former African American newspaper of the same name that was active from 1892 to 1970.) a conservative news website launched in 2021 in Dallas, Texas. He is a Republican donor and is known for various political causes in Texas.

== Early life and education ==
Bennett grew up in Houston, Texas, as one of seven children. His father, Archie Bennett Jr., was also a hospitality executive. He earned a Bachelor of Science degree from the Cornell University School of Hotel Administration in 1988, and a Master of Business Administration from Cornell University's Samuel Curtis Johnson Graduate School of Management in 1989.

== Career ==
=== Real estate career ===
In 1989, Bennett co-founded and joined Remington Hotels, a hotel company co-owned by his father. He grew the business from six hotels to over 130 by 2020, including Braemar real estate investment trust which operates 13 resort properties. He was CEO of Braemar Hotels & Resorts until 2016 and since 2013 has remained its chairman. He is also the founder of Ashford, a company that advises both Braemar Hotels & Resorts and Ashford Hospitality Trust, two publicly traded real estate investment trusts. Bennett was the CEO of Ashford Hospitality Trust from its founding until 2017, and he remains the firm's chairman.

In 2020, a number of large companies were criticized for receiving funds distributed through the Paycheck Protection Program (PPP) during the COVID-19 pandemic. Bennett's Ashford company received $56 million, the largest such distribution. Ashford announced in May 2020 that it would return the money after the company received backlash. Ashford had laid off or furloughed 95% of its 7,000 workers by late March 2020. Bennett forfeited 25% of his 2019 earned bonus, took a 20% cut in salary which he later took in stock only.

Bennett remained chairman of the board of Ashford Hospitality Trust after an attempt to replace him in 2024 by activist investor Blackwells Capital. He did not receive enough votes to be re-elected to the board at the company's annual shareholder meeting. The remaining board members followed the recommendation of the board's nominating and corporate governance committee and declined to accept Bennett's resignation.

=== Publishing career ===
In 2021, Bennett launched and became publisher of the Dallas Express, a conservative news website in Dallas, Texas. It is unrelated to the African-American Dallas newspaper of the same name that published from 1892 to 1970. In October 2020, The New York Times reported that Bennett had pitched a media network called Metric Media run by Brian Timpone to publish articles about topics ranging from COVID-19 stimulus legislation to U.S.–China policy. Bennett announced his acquisition of the Dallas Express in February 2021. That year, Bennett sued The Dallas Weekly, alleging libel over its unfavorable descriptions of the new Dallas Express, and prevailed at trial, although the case was dismissed on appeal in 2022 in Monacelli v. Bennett.

In 2024, the Texas Observer reported that Bennett had retained the services of Crowds on Demand, a group known for offering protesters-for-hire, to create a number of advocacy groups that were routinely quoted in articles in Bennett's Dallas Express without their disclosing behind-the-scenes connections. Bennett admitted that his company Ashford had hired Crowds on Demand but otherwise denied the findings of the Texas Observer report, which quoted Emily Bell, the founding director of the Tow Center for Digital Journalism at Columbia Journalism School, who said that the Dallas Express has violated basic journalistic ethics and is deceptive: "Effectively, the business model here is deception. It's not just about them being partisan. It's about them being dishonest and crossing basic lines of journalism. They're not even doing journalism. They're doing P.R., political advertising, or persuasion campaigns."

== Political involvement ==
Bennett donated more than $1.1 million to Donald Trump's presidential campaigns and to the Republican National Committee between the 2016 election and May 2020. He has been a supporter of Texas Governor Greg Abbott, and has donated more than $2.5 million to state-level candidates and political action committees in Texas. He is active in the school privatization movement and in efforts to elect more conservatives to school boards. He has been on the advisory boards of Texans for Education Reform and Texans for Education Rights. A 2023 article in The Real Deal about Bennett's increased activities in politics and media said that he has "engaged in many political battles, and won quite a few," particularly relating to local issues in Texas. He backed the proposed Dallas HERO ballot measures in 2024 to make major changes in Dallas city government. Of the three measures, two passed: the first removed sovereign immunity, making it easier to sue the city for not following laws, while the second would require the city to hire 900 additional police officers.

== Personal life ==
Bennett is married and has four children—two from a previous marriage, and two stepchildren. He has lived in the Dallas metroplex for more than 30 years, though he has admitted that he does not live within Dallas city limits. He also owns a 1,500-acre ranch in Athens, Texas, a portion of which has been in his family for three generations. In 2014, he won an out-of-court settlement against the Tarrant Regional Water District to divert a pipeline from running across his property, having created a conservation district on his land and brought endangered animals to live on the land, amongst other exotic animals he already had. He also established a cemetery in the pipeline's path to thwart it.
