= Cal 3 =

2017 proposal to split California into 3 states

Proposition 9
- Division of California into Three States
- Map of the three Californias Northern California (NorCal) California (Cal) Southern California (SoCal)

Cal 3 was a proposal to split the U.S. state of California into three states. It was launched in August 2017 by Silicon Valley venture capitalist Tim Draper, who led the effort to have it originally qualify on the November 2018 state ballot as Proposition 9, officially the Division of California into Three States initiative. Proponents of the proposal argued that dividing California into three states would provide fairer and more responsive governance for large regions outside of California’s major cities. In July 2018, the Supreme Court of California pulled it from the ballot for further state constitutional review. Draper officially stopped pushing for the measure soon after. On 12 September 2018, the court permanently removed the measure from all future ballots.

The Cal 3 proposal would not have legally split the state immediately; the division would have occurred only if and when the U.S. Congress consented to admit the new states to the Union per Article IV, Section 3 of the U.S. Constitution. Rather, the measure would have established procedures within the state government for the proposed split.

There were key procedural differences between the Cal 3 initiative and Draper's previous Six Californias plan, which failed to get enough signatures to qualify for the 2014 ballot. Among the differences, Cal 3 was an initiative to change a California statute, which required fewer petition signatures to qualify for the ballot than a proposed state constitutional amendment like the Six Californias plan. Also, language in the Cal 3 initiative was written so that if it was approved by the voters, the legislative consent required by Section 3 of Article IV "is given by the people" instead of directly by the California State Legislature.

As with his previous Six Californias plan, Draper and other proponents of Cal 3 said that the state is too large and ungovernable, and splitting California would produce smaller and more efficient state governments. Similarly to the previous plan, opponents said that such a split would be an unnecessary use of money and resources.

== Background ==
=== California history ===
California has been the subject of more than 220 proposals to divide it into multiple states since its admission to the union in 1850, including at least 27 significant proposals in the first 150 years of statehood.

Silicon Valley venture capitalist Tim Draper launched Six Californias, a proposed initiative to split California into six states, in December 2013. It failed to obtain sufficient signatures to qualify as a California ballot measure for the 2016 state elections. He spent more than $5 million to try to qualify the proposition for the ballot, including nearly $450,000 for political consultants.

=== Federal precedents ===
Article IV, Section 3 of the U.S. Constitution outlines the procedure for the admission of new U.S. states. It reads:

New States may be admitted by the Congress into this Union; but no new States shall be formed or erected within the Jurisdiction of any other State; nor any State be formed by the Junction of two or more States, or parts of States, without the Consent of the Legislatures of the States concerned as well as of the Congress.

There are several precedents for the creation of new states out of pre-existing ones. Note that the pre-existing state does not disappear but simply gets smaller when the new state is admitted. The original state is not renamed or re-admitted, since it never leaves the union. Congress addresses only the question of admitting the new state.

- The Commonwealth of Kentucky was admitted in 1792. It was created from the western territory of the Commonwealth of Virginia. The Virginia legislature had already approved release of the land when the old constitution was still in effect (1781–1789). But as the Congress had not acted before the new constitution was enacted, it passed the bill of consent again as a matter of course.
- North Carolina ceded its western territory to the United States, as the Southwest Territory. The Congress subsequently created it the State of Tennessee in 1796.
- The State of Georgia likewise ceded the western two-thirds of its post-1783 territory, part of which was disputed with the Spanish Colony of Florida until 1795. That territory was subsequently split in half, with the western portion created the State of Mississippi in 1817 and the eastern portion created the State of Alabama in 1819. Both states and the State of Louisiana (1812) were expanded when the United States acquired Florida from Spain in 1821, and divided the western half of the Florida Panhandle between the three.

One instance was related to slavery:

- In the 1820 Missouri Compromise, abolitionist-leaning states allowed Missouri to be admitted as a slave state subsequent to the Commonwealth of Massachusetts' agreement to release its northeastern territory (accounting for more than 75% of the Commonwealth's land area) for the admission of Maine as a free state. This kept the number of free states and slave states in balance. In fact, the independence of Maine from Massachusetts had been first considered three decades earlier for completely different reasons but the impending admission of Missouri as a slave state provided political momentum to achieve it.

One instance was a direct result of the Civil War:

- When Virginia seceded from the United States in 1861, the people in the northwestern counties of the state refused to support the decision. They formed a provisional Restored Government of Virginia and were admitted to the union as the State of West Virginia in 1863. They were admitted as a slave state and were exempted from the Emancipation Proclamation, on the understanding they would use the time thus allowed to prepare for the eventual abolition of slavery nationwide, which happened with the ratification of the Thirteenth Amendment in December 1865.

The admission of Vermont is often mistakenly presumed to be the result of a partition of New York, but that is not the actual history. At the time the American War for Independence began, most of the northern half of what is now Vermont was part of the British Province of Quebec. The southern half and west bank of the Connecticut River Valley had been disputed between New Hampshire and New York for several decades. When New Hampshire surrendered its claim in 1782, New York refused to recognise the grants of land made by New Hampshire decades earlier, which had been the bases for establishing 131 towns and New York's action infuriated Vermonters. The Privy Council in London ruled in favour of the Vermonters but the damage had already been done, so that six months after the Province of New York seceded from the British Empire, the Commonwealth of Vermont seceded from New York, in January 1777. The first Vermont Constitution was adopted in July 1777, and Vermont remained a fully independent nation for 14 years. Negotiations to join the United States were thwarted by perennial objection from New York, which continued to claim Vermont. New York finally surrendered its claim, paving the way for Vermont to ratify the U.S. Constitution on 10 January 1791, and be admitted as the 14th state on 4 March 1791.

A similar dispute arose between the State of Ohio and the Territory of Michigan in 1835-36, over which of them had rights to the Maumee Strip, including newly created Toledo. Ohio's claim was proper, so her consent was necessary for Michigan to become a state if it wanted to have Toledo. A compromise was reached under which Michigan was given the Upper Peninsula instead; and Michigan became a state in January 1837. There have been various proposals to split of the Upper Peninsula from time to time, see Superior (proposed U.S. state).

== Ballot qualification process ==
Draper introduced Cal 3 in August 2017. On October 24, 2017, California Secretary of State Alex Padilla gave approval for Draper to begin collecting petition signatures; under California state law, to qualify for the ballot, valid signatures of at least 365,880 registered California voters (five percent of the total votes cast for the Governor of California in the November 2014 general election) were required to be submitted by April 23, 2018. Because Cal 3 is an initiative to change a California statute instead of a state constitutional amendment, it requires fewer petition signatures to qualify for the ballot than the 807,615 that the Six Californias plan needed.

On April 12, 2018, eleven days before the deadline, Draper announced that he had collected over 600,000 signatures. On June 13, it was announced that there were sufficient valid signatures.

== Measure details ==
The Cal 3 measure would add a new article to the California Codes. It outlines three proposed new states, and then calls for the California State Legislature to divide and transform the existing state into the three states. The proposal would then need the approval of voters in California, and then of the Congress of the United States (per Article IV, Section 3 of the U.S. Constitution).

=== Proposed states ===
Map of the three Californias Northern California (NorCal) California (Cal) Southern California (SoCal)

Proposed state	Estimated Population
(New) California	12.3 million
Northern California	13.3 million
Southern California	13.9 million

The Cal 3 plan would divide the state's 58 counties among three states, tentatively named California (nicknamed Cal), Northern California (nicknamed NorCal), and Southern California (nicknamed SoCal). In drawing these new boundaries, Draper aimed to have it so that the three proposed states have nearly equal populations. The following was Draper's envisioned distribution of California's 58 counties into the proposed three Californias:

==== Counties in proposed state of California ====
- Los Angeles
- Monterey
- San Benito
- San Luis Obispo
- Santa Barbara
- Ventura

==== Counties in proposed state of Northern California ====
- Alameda
- Alpine
- Amador
- Butte
- Calaveras
- Colusa
- Contra Costa
- Del Norte
- El Dorado
- Glenn
- Humboldt
- Lake
- Lassen
- Marin
- Mariposa
- Mendocino
- Merced
- Modoc
- Napa
- Nevada
- Placer
- Plumas
- Sacramento
- San Francisco
- San Joaquin
- San Mateo
- Santa Clara
- Santa Cruz
- Shasta
- Sierra
- Siskiyou
- Solano
- Sonoma
- Stanislaus
- Sutter
- Tehama
- Trinity
- Tuolumne
- Yolo
- Yuba

==== Counties in proposed state of Southern California ====
- Fresno
- Imperial
- Inyo
- Kern
- Kings
- Madera
- Mono
- Orange
- Riverside
- San Bernardino
- San Diego
- Tulare

=== State-splitting process ===
If passed by voters, the measure then directed the Governor of California on January 1, 2019, to formally submit the state-splitting request to the U.S. Congress along with the certified elections results, and ask them to grant approval within twelve months. Language in the measure stated that for the purposes of Article IV, Section 3 of the U.S. Constitution, the legislative consent for splitting the state "is given by the people".

The measure also directed the California State Legislature to divide California's assets and liabilities among the three new states. If the legislature was unable to pass such a plan within 12 months of the U.S. Congress' approval to split California, the assets and liabilities would be distributed among the three new states based on their populations.

== Analysis ==
=== Fiscal and policy implications ===
Proposed state	Estimated Per Capita
California (Cal)	$53,000
Northern California (NorCal)	$63,000
Southern California (SoCal)	$45,000

Because various parts of the state have deep economic ties with the other areas, splitting California would be a very complicated economic and public policy process. Water rights, transportation and infrastructure projects, California's public postsecondary education system, and other public programs are fully integrated throughout the state.

The income levels, and therefore the personal tax bases, in the proposed states differ. Based on 2015 values, the proposed (new) California state would rank about 12th among the states in per capita personal income, the new Northern California would be 2nd, and the new Southern California would be 30th. Because the new Southern California would be below the average of the rest of the country, it might struggle financially in its initial years. The new Northern California would have the higher per capita, while the (new) California would have the largest income disparity.

The income and wealth differences among the three states would result in different future policies in taxes and public spending. Each new state could adopt different laws, either stricter or more lenient, on these issues than what California currently has on the books. For example, the new states may limit or discontinue Proposition 13's inflexible limits on taxes or Proposition 98's school-funding guarantee. Other programs that could be affected include health programs, social services programs, prisons and other crime-related policies, and transportation projects. These differing policies would result in long-term demographic and economic changes, as various groups of people will want to migrate to those new states with laws more favorable to them.

If California's university system were to split under Cal 3, the new Northern California would have both the most University of California campuses and the most California State University campuses. California's prison system is also unequally distributed, with the proposed Southern California housing 55% of California's current prison inmates and the (new) California only housing 13 percent.

California's current water issues and water rights would also have to be resolved. The proposed new California would be a net importer of water, as the California Aqueduct would then originate in the new Northern California, and both the Los Angeles Aqueduct and the Colorado River Aqueduct would originate in the new Southern California. Some of these issues might have to be addressed by both the U.S. Congress and the courts. The three states would also have to negotiate other infrastructure projects such as the California High-Speed Rail project and decide whether to continue financing them as multi-state systems.

Furthermore, each new state would have to pay various one-time costs to set up separate state governments, new capitols and other administration buildings, and so forth.

=== National political implications ===
Presidential vote
Proposed state	2012		
Proposed state	Obama %	Romney %	Margin of victory
California (Cal)	66.9	30.5	+36.4
Northern California (NorCal)	64.4	32.4	+32.0
Southern California (SoCal)	49.1	48.4	+0.6
Proposed state	2016		
Proposed state	Clinton %	Trump %	Margin of victory
California (Cal)	68.9	24.8	+44.0
Northern California (NorCal)	64.4	27.7	+36.7
Southern California (SoCal)	51.5	41.8	+9.7

2016 presidential election results in the proposed states

California (Cal)

Northern California (NorCal)

Southern California (SoCal)

The proposed state of Southern California would have populated areas such as the San Joaquin Valley that lean toward the Republican Party, leading legal scholar Vikram Amar to believe that this is a "deal breaker" for the Democratic Party. California is currently a safe state for Democrats with 55 votes in the Electoral College, and therefore splitting the state would also split those guaranteed electoral votes and make the new Southern California a potential swing state. Legal scholar Jonathan Turley told CNN, "Dems consider California to be a single golden empire, it would be hard for them to accept it as three golden empires".

Splitting the state would create four new seats in the U.S. Senate, two for each of the two newly created states. Although the proposed Southern California state may be more competitive for the Republican Party, the worst case for them would be that all of these new seats would go Democratic. In any case, Turley explained that the addition of four new senators "could create endless tensions between representatives".

As Sabato's Crystal Ball postulates, Democrats might not want to risk losing one third of California's current electoral votes to potentially gain four new Senate seats. Conversely, Republicans also might not want to put those electoral votes into play at the expense of Democrats gaining those Senate seats. Finally, states outside of California may oppose diluting their representation in the Senate.

Thus, Congress could easily just opt not to act on the Cal 3 results, much like the Puerto Rico political status plebiscites in which Puerto Rico voters were asked whether they wanted statehood, free association, or independence.

=== Legal issues ===
The Cal 3 plan raises both U.S. and California constitutional issues, which led the California Legislative Analyst's Office to predict in its initiative analysis that the measure would almost certainly be challenged on multiple grounds.

A key U.S. constitutional issue is whether a voter initiative is sufficient for the state legislative approval that is required under Section 3 of Article IV for the creation of new states. The voter initiative process was not established by various states until decades after West Virginia split from Virginia in 1863, so there is no clear precedent for this specific case. However, the Supreme Court of California has ruled that a voter initiative is not sufficient for the state legislative consent that is required to call for a U.S. constitutional convention.

Another issue is that there is no clear precedent indicating that a single state can be carved up into multiple ones. When West Virginia was admitted to the U.S. as a separate state, most of the new state's counties had in fact supported secession. As Vikram Amar asks, "when Article IV speaks of the need for the consent of the 'States concerned,' does that mean (in the context of a single state that is being subdivided) only consent of the mother state (which is to be divided), or also consent of the newly created states?" For example, what happens if the Cal 3 ballot measure passes statewide, but most of the voters in the proposed (New) California state opposed it?

As for California constitutional issues, there is the question as to whether a statutory initiative measure like this one, without any state constitutional amendments, can start a process that fundamentally revises the state government's basic framework. Under the California Constitution, a proposal that substantially alters the state's basic governmental framework must be a state constitutional amendment that originates from either the State Legislature or a constitutional convention, and not from a ballot initiative. As Vikram Amar writes, "Certainly breaking California up alters, as a quantitative matter, most every provision in the constitution, by shrinking its effective reach ... such a division is first and foremost a matter of structure ... what is of greater importance to a state’s overall structure than its geographic boundaries?"

There could also be multiple court challenges on how the state's existing liabilities are split among the new states, whether based on a plan passed by the State Legislature, or distributed based on their relative populations (as mandated by the proposal if the State Legislature fails to decide on such a plan). Among the existing liabilities are all the bonds that have been issued as a result of other passed laws or ballot measures. There is also the question as to what to do with all the health and retirement benefits and other compensation owed to the state's current public employees. There are also liabilities mandated by other policies. A number of these bonds, employee plans, and policies are currently unfunded, awaiting revenue from future state budgets. Furthermore, many of these liabilities are mandated by California constitutional amendments, so a case could be made that splitting the state may unconstitutionally impair the contractual rights of all these bondholders and public employees.

== Legal challenges ==
On July 9, the Planning and Conservation League, an environmental group, became the first party to file a lawsuit to block the measure, asking the Supreme Court of California to pull Cal 3 off the ballot on the aforementioned grounds that it would be a revision to the state constitution that substantially alters the state's basic governmental framework. In their response, Cal 3 supporters on July 12 stated that it was "just another example of how Sacramento politicians, powerful unions and their high-priced lobbyists are trying to hold onto power at the expense of California voters". Draper also wrote a response directly to the court, stating that there is not enough time to properly consider the legal challenge: "I have been given just a day or two to respond to a complex, multi-faceted attack on my Constitutional right to initiative. This Court's long history of jealously guarding the exercise of initiative power should not be cavalierly disregarded now, especially on such a truncated timetable".

In a unanimous decision on July 18, the California Supreme Court removed the measure from the 2018 ballot, ordering further legal arguments on whether it can be restored on the 2020 ballot or struck down completely. In its ruling, the court stated that "significant questions have been raised regarding the proposition’s validity and because we conclude that the potential harm in permitting the measure to remain on the ballot outweighs the potential harm in delaying the proposition to a future election." Responding to the court's order, Draper labelled it as "corruption", "the insiders are in cahoots", and that the California Supreme Court justices "probably would have lost their jobs" if Cal 3 passed.

On 12 September 2018, in another unanimous decision, the Supreme Court of California permanently removed Cal 3 from all future ballots, stating:

On August 9, 2018, petitioner (the party challenging the validity of the initiative measure) and real party in interest (the proponent of the initiative measure) filed separate documents in this court. Petitioner filed a request for an order granting the petition and directing the Secretary of State to refrain from placing the challenged initiative measure on the November 2018 ballot or on any future ballot. Real party in interest filed a document stating that he "do[es] not object to the Court making its [prior] order permanent without further briefing or hearing." Under the circumstances, we construe the real party in interest's filing as consenting to the entry of a stipulated judgment in favor of petitioner. The court has received no objection to proceeding in this fashion. Accordingly, the petition is granted and the Secretary of State is directed to refrain from placing the challenged initiative measure on the November 2018 ballot or any future ballot.

== Stances on the proposal ==
=== Support ===
Tim Draper's motivation is essentially the same as for his failed Six Californias proposal. He has stated that California is ungovernable as is, with the legislature unable to keep pace with issues in all the state's regions, especially in areas such as job creation, education, affordable housing, and water and transportation infrastructure. Furthermore, he believes that the current state government is losing touch with the people of California. According to Draper, splitting up the state would allow the resulting new state governments to be closer to their people than the current California state government.

Republican California State Senator Joel Anderson stated that he will vote for Cal 3 as a referendum on the state's Democratic leadership, saying that "there is no greater insult to the one-party rule in California. It's a barometer of the potential unhappiness of the state."

=== Opposition ===
Both the 2018 Republican and Democratic nominees for governor have voiced opposition to the plan. Democratic nominee, then-California Lieutenant Governor Gavin Newsom told reporters on June 13 that "California's success is being a cohesive state, particularly at a time of [U.S. President Donald] Trump and Trumpism. We're now the fifth largest economy in the world. Why would we cede that to splitting the state up into three?" Republican nominee John H. Cox said on June 18 that he does not think Draper's plan is the answer, and that "we need to do a better job of managing the state".

The California Republican Party voted overwhelmingly to oppose it at their April convention.

Eric C. Bauman, Chairman of the California Democratic Party, said that "it's going to be more money flushed down the toilet. Only one guy is behind it, and everyone is against it".

Democratic political consultant Steven Maviglio has stated that it would be cheaper to operate California's current vast statewide government, telling LA Weekly, "It's costly and impractical if you split up the existing system". Maviglio also stated that Cal 3 "doesn’t solve a single problem in the state or add a single job".

The California Chamber of Commerce stated that "this measure would instead create an entirely new suite of problems to distract and consumer [sic] voters, political leaders, concerned citizens and ordinary residents".

== Polling ==
Date(s) conducted	Polling organization/client	Sample size	Margin of error	Yes	No	Undecided
June 26–27, 2018	SurveyUSA	559	± 5.1%	13%	75%	12%
April 19–23, 2018	SurveyUSA	916	± 3.6%	17%	72%	10%
