= Elizabeth Currid-Halkett =

American social researcher and author

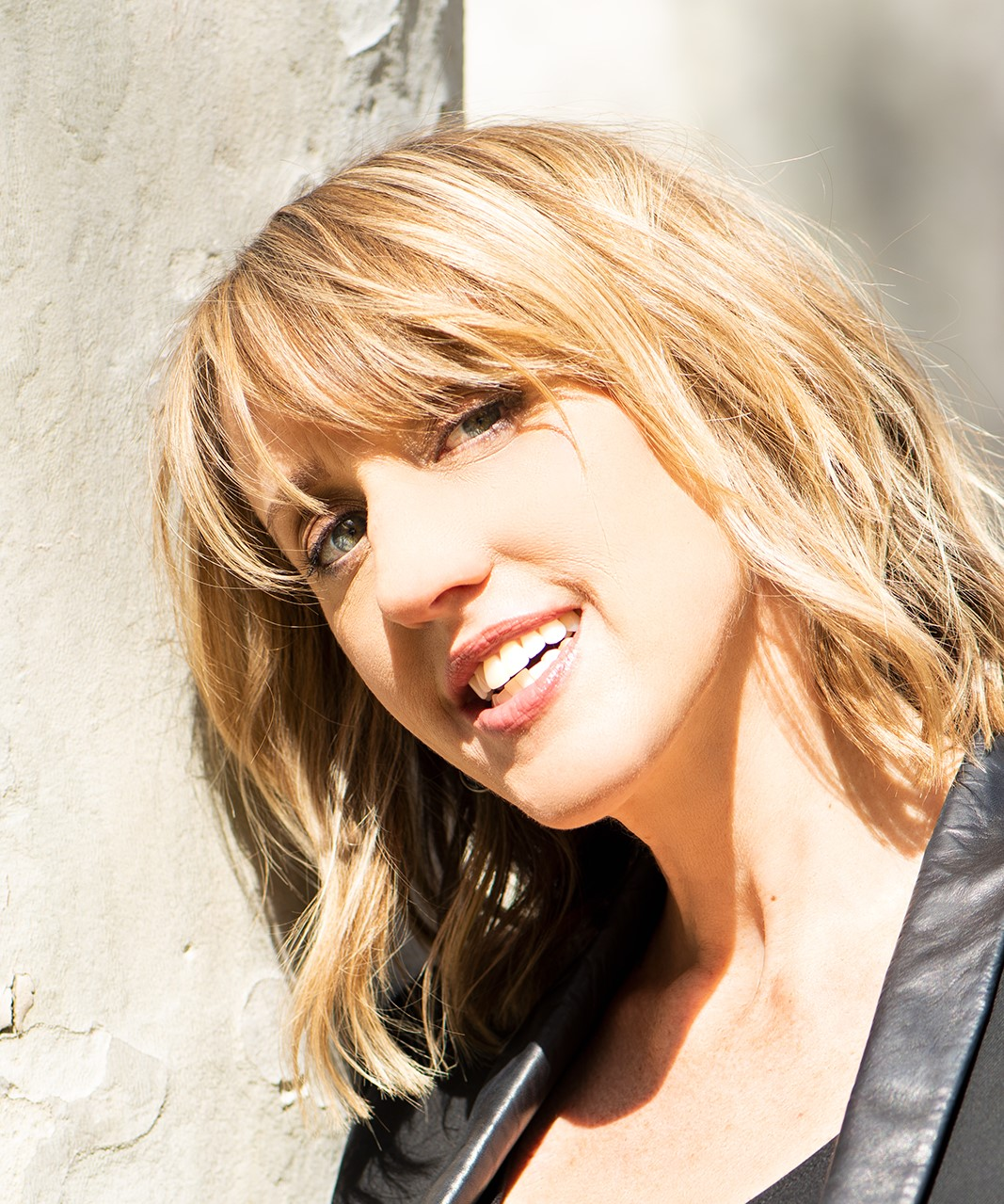
Currid-Halkett in 2019

Elizabeth Currid-Halkett is an American academic and author. She is the James Irvine Chair of Urban and Regional Planning and Professor of Public Policy at the University of Southern California.

== Education ==
Currid-Halkett received her PhD in urban planning from Columbia University. She received a Bachelor of Arts in Creative Writing and Professional Writing and a Master's of Public Policy from Carnegie Mellon University.

== Career ==
Currid-Halkett is a scholar of urban studies and economic geography. Her research documents the importance of the arts to the urban economy and the role of cultural capital in defining and perpetuating class inequality in America. In a 2017 National Public Radio Hidden Brain interview with Currid-Halkett, Shankar Vedantam summarizes her research as a study of the social networks of elites.

Currid-Halkett's 2007 book, The Warhol Economy, documents how artists, designers, musicians and other creative workers are essential to the vibrancy of New York City. She interviewed dozens of people who work in creative industries from the newly established to well-known names including Shepard Fairey, Diane Von Furstenberg, Quincy Jones and Ryan McGinness In her research, she argues that the social life of creative workers is instrumental to their careers and to the creative economy. Currid-Halkett extended this argument to a comparative analysis with Los Angeles where she and MIT professor Sarah Williams looked at Getty Images photographic data of thousands of entertainment events to track the social life of creative people in a project entitled "The Geography of Buzz". In a 2014 paper in PLOS One, Currid-Halkett and Williams used cell phone data and social media to track and analyze the creative process of New York City fashion industry workers.

Currid-Halkett's 2010 book, Starstruck, studies the economics of celebrity, in particular using social network analysis to study the relationship between social life and star power. Currid-Halkett argues that the A-list inhabits a closed network, or what is termed a clique (graph theory), leaving out everyone else.

Currid-Halkett's 2017 book, The Sum of Small Things: A Theory of the Aspirational Class, analyzes the role of culture in signifying class in America today. Drawing from Thorstein Veblen's original treatise, The Theory of the Leisure Class, Currid-Halkett argues that unlike conventional "conspicuous consumption" today's elite, whom she calls the "aspirational class" spend on "inconspicuous consumption", expensive but largely immaterial investments. This "cultural elite" use their wealth towards goods and services such as education, domestic services and health care, all of which save time and shore up privilege for themselves and their offspring. Currid-Halkett argues that this cultural capital contributes to growing inequality in America. Some commentators have remarked that Currid-Halkett's aspirational class is part and parcel of the contemporary class and culture war in America.

Currid-Halkett's work has also appeared and been featured in mainstream publications including NPR, The New York Times, Los Angeles Times, The Wall Street Journal, The New Yorker and The Economist.

== Reception ==
Currid-Halkett's work has been noted for its detailed documentation of the importance of the arts and culture to the economy. On The Warhol Economy, James Surowiecki writes in The New Yorker, "…everyone knows that art and culture help make New York a great place to live. But Currid goes much further, showing that the culture industry creates tremendous economic value in its own right." Currid-Halkett's 2017 book The Sum of Small Things has been reviewed as a convincing account of the role of consumption and cultural practices in today's growing inequality. The Economist named The Sum of Small Things one of the Books of the Year 2017. David Brooks argued in The New York Times that Currid-Halkett's study of invisible cultural signals offers another means to understand class barriers in America. Simon Kuper of The Financial Times remarked, "This is the cultural elite — or what Elizabeth Currid-Halkett... calls the "aspirational class". Her book The Sum of Small Things anatomises it using fascinating American consumption data... Her intellectual ancestor Thorstein Veblen, in his 1899 study The Theory of the Leisure Class, portrayed Wasps frittering away money, but today's cultural elite is engaged in a ruthless project to reproduce its social position... No wonder the key rite of cultural-elite conversation has become Trump-dissing... And so the cultural wars that got him elected rage on."

Others have challenged Currid-Halkett's critique arguing that the cultural capital she lauds as a signifier of the "aspirational class" may not be desired by other groups. A critique in Times Higher Education challenged that it is too early to tell what changing consumption patterns might imply.

== Private ==
In 2019, Currid-Halkett became mother of a son, who suffers from Duchenne muscular dystrophy (DMD). He received a gene therapy treatment, the first of its kind for DMD.

== Works ==
- Currid, E. (2007). The Warhol Economy: How Fashion, Art and Music Drive New York City Princeton: Princeton University Press
- Currid-Halkett, E. (2010). Starstruck: The Business of Celebrity. New York: Farrar, Straus and Giroux
- Currid-Halkett, E. (2017). The Sum of Small Things: A Theory of the Aspirational Class. Princeton: Princeton University Press.
- Currid, E.; Williams, S. (21 July 2009). "The geography of buzz: art, culture and the social milieu in Los Angeles and New York". Journal of Economic Geography. 10 (3): 423–451. doi:10.1093/jeg/lbp032.
- Williams, Sarah; Currid-Halkett, Elizabeth; Ramasco, José Javier (5 February 2014). "Industry in Motion: Using Smart Phones to Explore the Spatial Network of the Garment Industry in New York City". PLOS ONE. 9 (2) e86165. Bibcode:2014PLoSO...986165W. doi:10.1371/journal.pone.0086165. PMC 3914789. PMID 24505256.
- Opinion | Gene Therapies Could Transform Rare Diseases. Are We Holding Them Back? - The New York Times (nytimes.com)
