= Six Californias =

Proposed initiative to split California into six states

Map of the Six Californias Jefferson North California Silicon Valley Central California West California South California

Six Californias was a proposed initiative to split the U.S. state of California into six states. It failed to qualify as a California ballot measure for the 2016 state elections due to receiving insufficient signatures.

Venture capitalist Tim Draper launched the measure in December 2013. He spent in excess of $5 million trying to qualify the proposition for the ballot, with nearly $450,000 for political consultants. Had the measure passed, it would not have legally split California immediately; consent would eventually need to be given by both the California State Legislature and the U.S. Congress to admit the new states to the union per Article IV, Section 3 of the U.S. Constitution. Rather, the measure would have established several procedures within the state government and its 58 counties to prepare California for the proposed split, and instructed the Governor of California to submit the state-splitting proposal to Congress.

The proposed states would have been named Jefferson, North California, Silicon Valley, Central California, West California, and South California. Draper's stated reasoning for the proposal was that the state is too large and ungovernable, and he therefore wanted to split California to produce six smaller and more efficient state governments.

Opponents argued that it would have been a waste of money and resources to split California and create these new governments. Critics also charged that this was a money and political power grab designed to separate California's higher-income communities from lower-income areas, and to diminish the state's reliability as a predominantly Democratic Party-supporting "blue state".

== Background ==
Article IV, Section 3 of the U.S. Constitution outlines the procedure for the admission of new U.S. states. It reads:

New States may be admitted by the Congress into this Union; but no new States shall be formed or erected within the Jurisdiction of any other State; nor any State be formed by the Junction of two or more States, or parts of States, without the Consent of the Legislatures of the States concerned as well as of the Congress.

There are several precedents for the partition of states:

- Vermont, admitted in 1791, was created from territory to which a disputed claim was asserted by New York. (It had formerly also been claimed by New Hampshire, but that claim had been given up in 1782. Vermont already had a separate government not recognized by New York for over a decade.) New York's legislature consented in 1790.
- Kentucky split from Virginia in 1792. Virginia's legislature consented to the partition when the Articles of Confederation were still in effect, but then the new Constitution of the United States superseded the Articles and the legislature's consent was passed again.
- North Carolina ceded territory to the federal government which became the Southwest Territory and five years later in 1796 became the state of Tennessee;
- Georgia ceded land that later became part of Alabama.

Two instances were a result of slavery:

- The 1820 Missouri Compromise balanced the number of free and slave states by splitting Maine from Massachusetts in 1820 and admitting Missouri in 1821. However, the partition of Maine from Massachusetts had been proposed well over three decades earlier for reasons other than slavery.
- West Virginia was admitted to the U.S. as a separate state in 1863 when the Union-loyal Restored Government of Virginia broke from Virginia after Virginia joined the Confederate States of America in 1861.

California has been the subject of more than 220 proposals to divide it into multiple states, including at least 27 serious proposals. Several of these attempts proposed the creation of a State of Jefferson that would span the contiguous, mostly rural area of southern Oregon and northern California.

== Ballot qualification process ==
Six Californias was introduced in December 2013 by Silicon Valley venture capitalist Tim Draper. California Secretary of State Debra Bowen approved Draper to begin collecting petition signatures in February 2014. The petition needed to submit sufficient valid signatures of registered California voters by July 18, 2014, to qualify as a November election ballot proposition. As the petition deadline drew closer, Draper suggested that the initiative would be postponed to 2016, since that would allow more time to educate the public on the initiative.

On July 14, Draper announced that the proposal received 1.3 million signatures, enough to qualify for the ballot, and began submitting them to elections officials. Had sufficient signatures been verified, per California law, it would have qualified for the November 2016 state ballot. On September 12, 2014, California state election officials announced that based on random sampling of the submitted signatures, only an estimated 752,685 signatures were valid, which was insufficient not only to qualify the initiative for the ballot, but also to trigger a complete verification of all submitted signatures.

These estimated valid signatures were 66.15% of the 1,137,844 submitted signatures. At least 807,615 signatures, 70.98% of the submitted signatures, had to be valid for the measure to qualify for the ballot. At least 767,235 signatures, 67.43% of the submitted signatures, had to be estimated to be valid in order for the petition to qualify for a second mandatory phase to review all of the submitted signatures, not just random samples.

Also on September 12, 2014, the campaign announced its intent to "... conduct a review of the signatures determined to be invalid by the registrars in several counties to determine if they were in fact valid signatures." To qualify for a full check of all signatures in all fifty-eight counties, the review must find about 450 wrongly invalidated signatures among those submitted in the fifteen counties that sampled 3% of the total signatures submitted in each of those fifteen counties. As of November 17, 2014, the campaign has not updated its web site with information about the results of their review of the supposedly invalid signatures.

Opponents of the initiative filed a complaint with Secretary of State Debra Bowen on July 17, 2014, asking her office to investigate allegations of voter fraud. The complaint, filed on behalf of the OneCalifornia committee formally opposing the Six Californias initiative, follows reports that signature gatherers for Six Californias claimed that those who signed "would be opposing the Attorney General of California's intention to split the state into six states" – the exact opposite of the petitions intentions. Signature gathering for Six Californias was carried out by Arno Political Consultants. The campaign for Six Californias also paid $51,000 to Crowds on Demand, a service that sends paid actors to form crowds at gatherings such as political rallies. Organizers for Six Californias stated Crowds on Demand provided personnel for signature gathering.

== Measure details ==
The measure outlined the proposed new states, then established several procedures within the state government and all the counties to prepare California for the proposed split. The proposal would then have needed the approval of voters in California, the Congress of the United States (per Article IV, Section 3 of the U.S. Constitution), and the California State Legislature.

=== Proposed states ===
Six Californias would have divided the state's 58 counties among six new states: Jefferson (based on the historic State of Jefferson proposal), North California, Silicon Valley, Central California, West California, and South California.

Proposed state	Estimated population
Jefferson	949,409
North California	3,820,438
Silicon Valley	6,828,617
Central California	4,232,419
West California	11,563,717
South California	10,809,997

==== Jefferson ====
The state of Jefferson would have been created from the far north part of California, bordering Oregon, consisting of fourteen counties: Butte, Colusa, Del Norte, Glenn, Humboldt, Lake, Lassen, Mendocino, Modoc, Plumas, Shasta, Siskiyou, Tehama, and Trinity. Unlike the historic State of Jefferson proposal, this new state would not include any territory from Oregon.

==== North California ====
The state of North California would have been south of Jefferson spanning from the Pacific Ocean to Nevada. North California would have consisted of thirteen counties: Amador, El Dorado, Marin, Napa, Nevada, Placer, Sacramento, Sierra, Solano, Sonoma, Sutter, Yolo, and Yuba.

==== Silicon Valley ====
The state of Silicon Valley would have spanned the coastline from San Francisco to Monterey. It would have consisted of eight counties: Alameda, Contra Costa, Monterey, San Benito, San Francisco, San Mateo, Santa Clara, and Santa Cruz.

==== Central California ====
The state of Central California would have been between Silicon Valley and Nevada. It would have consisted of the fourteen counties north of Los Angeles and south of Sacramento: Alpine, Calaveras, Fresno, Inyo, Kern, Kings, Madera, Mariposa, Merced, Mono, San Joaquin, Stanislaus, Tulare, and Tuolumne.

==== West California ====
The state of West California would have been south of Silicon Valley and Central California, and west of the current San Bernardino County. It would have consisted of four counties: Los Angeles, San Luis Obispo, Santa Barbara, and Ventura.

==== South California ====
The state of South California would have been made up of the southernmost part of the state, bordering Mexico and Arizona. It would have consisted of five counties: Imperial, Orange, Riverside, San Bernardino, and San Diego.

=== State-splitting process and other procedures ===
The above division was not set in stone. The proposal allowed a county along one of the proposed new state borders to join an adjacent state instead, subject to the approval of both that county's voters (via a county ballot measure) and its Boards of Supervisors by November 15, 2017.

A board of 24 commissioners would also have been appointed to negotiate how to divide California's existing assets and liabilities among the new states. The initiative also explicitly stated that the Governor of California will be required to submit the state-splitting proposal to Congress by January 1, 2018.

In addition, California's charter counties would have been allowed more power over municipal affairs that currently may be controlled by city governments. This change was meant for the interim period between the passing of the initiative and congressional approval of the new states, but would have remained in place even if Congress did not pass the state-splitting proposal.

In final section of the initiative, "the official proponent of the initiative" (Draper) was to be appointed as an "Agent of the State of California" for the purpose of defending the proposal against legal challenges.

== Analysis ==
Politically, North California, Silicon Valley, West California, and to a lesser extent South California would lean Democratic, while Jefferson and especially Central California would be competitive.

The California Legislative Analyst's Office, in a report that covered a wide variety of impacts, noted a wide disparity of incomes and tax bases in the proposed states. The report estimated that the state of Silicon Valley would have the nation's highest per capita personal income (PCPI) whereas the state of Central California would have the nation's lowest PCPI. During the two-year period between passage of the measure, the 24-member Commission would have had to decide how the California state resources would be divided and how the present debt would be distributed between the six states. The areas most affected would have been required to make decisions including school funding, health and social services, water management, and the handling of prisons. Each new state would have also been faced with new budgets, establishing methods of revenue, funding infrastructure, public employee compensation, and new, revised or discarded laws. Most likely, many issues would have had to be resolved by the courts. The Huffington Post further published a map detailing how splitting California would result in these separate rich states and poor states.

Vikram Amar wrote a preliminary analysis of the difficulties that the Six Californias measure would face. His piece, published by the law group Justia, raised several constitutional questions on the proposal, including whether the people of a U.S. state can authorize such a split by popular initiative, and whether several new states can be validly created under Article IV by splitting the territory of a single existing state. Furthermore, Draper, as the appointed "Agent of the State of California" for the purpose of defending the proposal in court, may not actually be able to do so because of both the U.S. Supreme Court's ruling in Hollingsworth v. Perry; and Article II, Section 12, of the California Constitution that prohibits any constitutional amendment that names a specific individual to hold a particular office. Amar also wrote that the measure might be blocked by the California courts on grounds that it is a revision to the California constitution instead of an amendment. A proposed revision to the California constitution, a change that substantially alters the state's basic governmental framework, must originate from either the Legislature or a constitutional convention, not from a ballot initiative.

A prior study by the state assembly report would allow for multistate reorganization of the university system, and any other present state function. It would be the job of the 24 member commission to decide. If the university system were to split, a report identified a potential increase in tuition for current Californians who attend a University of California campus, particularly residents in California's most northern state of Jefferson who would not have a single UC campus in the state. Based on the report's findings, Six Californias could result in over 60% of California students being classified as out-of-state, costing Californian families $2.5 billion more per year. California's prison system is also unequally spread out. If the prison system were to split, the new urban states of Silicon Valley and West California would each have to construct several new prisons since most of the current ones in California are located in the rural areas. California's current water and water rights issues would also have to have been resolved among the new states. The California, Hetch Hetchy, Los Angeles, Mokelumne, and other major aqueducts would cross the new state lines. If not reorganized into a multistate function, this would result in the new states of Silicon Valley and West California having to heavily rely on importing water from the other states.

The report by the California Legislative Analyst's Office specifically named several other major issues that could have been affected by the decisions made by the leaders of each new state: crime, public safety and gun control/ownership; economic development; the environment; public employee pensions; laws related to marriage and family; taxes; and transportation and other infrastructure. Each new state could adopt different laws, either stricter or more lenient, on those issues than what California currently has on the books. These differing policies would have in turn eventually result in long-term demographic and economic changes, as various groups of people will want to migrate to those new states with laws more favorable to them.

Vikram Amar agrees there are governance problems in California. The demographic, cultural, political and economic differences between the urban and rural areas of California are obvious, as are the tensions between the major urban areas of San Francisco and Los Angeles. However splitting California is a radical change, and a major question is whether the newly formed poorer states can make it without the tax revenues from the major metropolitan areas. The political makeup in Washington D.C. at the time of approval, may determine the success or failure of six Californias. Twelve Senators would result from six Californias, as well as a probable change in total house House seats and their electoral votes. According to Amar, "we could expect four [Senators] (from Silicon Valley and West California) to consistently be Democrats, and four (from Jefferson and Central California) to lean Republican, with the other four (from Northern California and South California) harder to predict".

== Stances on the proposal ==
=== Support ===
Tim Draper indicated that the initiative was motivated by the belief that California is ungovernable as is with legislature unable to keep up on issues in all the state's regions, especially in areas such as job creation, education, affordable housing, and water and transportation infrastructure. Furthermore, he believed that the current state government is getting out of touch with the people of California. According to Draper, splitting up the state would allow the resulting new state governments to be closer to their people than the current California state government.

=== Opposition ===
OneCalifornia, a bi-partisan committee to oppose the Six Californias ballot proposal, was formed in April 2014. It is co-chaired by Joe Rodota, former Cabinet Secretary for Governor Pete Wilson; and Steven Maviglio, former Press Secretary to Governor Gray Davis. The committee suggested that the initiative was damaging the state's image in the world economy. Rodota stated: "Every day this measure marches its way toward the ballot it damages the California brand as the nation's economic powerhouse. It has negative implications that could cost California's businesses and taxpayers tens of billions of dollars." In an opinion piece in the U-T San Diego, Maviglio and Rodota wrote that if the measure passes, it "will set in motion the most bureaucratic, costly, paper-pushing process in our history ... we'd spend years doing nothing more than rewriting laws, duplicating government offices, and spending billions of dollars unnecessarily." Furthermore, that it could increase the lobbying industry sixfold in California "to deal with the flood of open questions", and would be a burden on California businesses due to the increase of federal regulations regarding interstate commerce.

The segregation of the incomes and tax bases led to criticism that the proposal is merely a money and political power grab for Silicon Valley and California's other wealthy areas. Phillip Bump of the Washington Post wrote that "this entire plan is really about creating Silicon Valley as its own state. Therefore Silicon Valley gets to be a state called 'Silicon Valley,' and it gets to make its politics and its money more dense, and everyone in the idyllic dream of Silicon Valley gets to be happy."

Brendan Nyhan said that the idea would be unlikely to pass Congress due to disruption it would cause in the political balance of the U.S. Senate, as well as other sticking points. Opponents said that the initiative was a thinly disguised Republican power play aimed at diminishing the electoral votes that have historically gone to Democrats in California. In a survey of the California congressional delegation, The Hill found that the Democrats opposed the proposition, while the Republicans were generally divided.

Thus, a couple of political experts countered that the measure would not get the approval of all the parties needed; the voters would not necessarily wish to break up the state with the cost of setting up six new state governments and five new capitals, and Congress may not want five more states in the mix.

== Subsequent attempts ==
=== Cal 3 ===
Cal 3's planned states Northern California California Southern California

A subsequent Draper initiative to divide California was launched in August 2017. The measure was titled by California Attorney General Xavier Becerra "Division of California into Three States", though it is commonly known as Cal 3. On June 13, 2018, it was announced that among the 600,000 signatures the initiative had received there were more than the 365,880 valid signatures needed, and the initiative would be put to the vote in November 2018. However, in July 2018, the California Supreme Court pulled it from the ballot for further state constitutional review.

=== "Two state solution" ===
The remaining California and the new state that would be created as envisioned in Joint Resolution 23 (as amended 13 September 2025) Counties that would remain in California Counties that would form a new state

In August 2025, California State Assembly minority leader James Gallagher proposed a "two state solution" in response to the placement of Proposition 50 on the ballot. Gallagher's proposal, introduced at the State Legislature as Joint Resolution 23, would split California roughly along its length, with all the coastal counties except Orange and Del Norte, the counties along the San Francisco Bay, and Lake, Yolo, Sacramento, and San Benito Counties remaining in California and the rest splitting off to form another state. The resolution itself, if passed, would not split the state but would send the matter to the United States Congress. Six Republican Assembly members (Leticia Castillo, Heather Hadwick, Tom Lackey, Alexandra Macedo, Joe Patterson, and Kate Sanchez) and one Republican State Senator (Megan Dahle) joined Gallagher in co-sponsoring the joint resolution.
