= Steven Maviglio =

American political consultant

- Education: University of New Hampshire
- Occupations: Political consultant, President of Forza Communications
- Political party: Democratic Party
- Website: forzacommunications.com

Steven Maviglio is a political consultant. He is also the founder and President of Forza Communications, a public affairs and campaign firm based in Sacramento, California.

He has been a political strategist for more than 25 statewide and local campaigns in California, including ballot measures to protect the state's climate action plan (Proposition 23), ban plastic bags (Proposition 65 and 67), and pass a water bond for safe drinking water (Proposition 1). He also has worked to pass legislation on zero emission vehicles, increasing access to health care and climate. He was the communications director/press secretary for Governor Gray Davis and Deputy Chief of Staff for California Assembly Speakers Fabian Nunez and Karen Bass, and a communications consultant for Speaker John A. Perez. He also was a three-term lawmaker in the New Hampshire House and in leadership roles for Congressmen Vic Fazio (D-California) and Rush Holt (D-New Jersey).

== Early life and education ==
Maviglio received his bachelor's degree in public relations from Boston University and master's degree in public administration from the University of New Hampshire.

== Career ==
After graduating from college, Maviglio served three terms as an elected member of the New Hampshire House of Representatives and ran a variety of campaigns. Maviglio served as field coordinator of New Hampshire Asks, a group devoted to making health care a major issue in the 1992 campaign.

In 1994, he moved to Washington, D.C. to serve in two posts in the Clinton administration which included Director of Public and Legislative Affairs in the U.S. Department of Justice's Community Oriented Policing Services program as well as Special Assistant for Public Affairs to the Director of the U.S. Trade and Development Agency. Maviglio later served as executive director of the House Democratic Caucus and then as Administrative Assistant to Rush D. Holt.

Maviglio became California Governor Gray Davis’ press secretary in 2000. From 2003 to 2004 Maviglio was a member of the California Unemployment Insurance Appeals Board. He served as Deputy Chief of Staff for Assembly Speaker Fabian Núñez as well as his successor Karen Bass and as communications consultant to Speaker John A. Perez.

Maviglio founded Forza Communications, a public affairs and campaign firm in 2008. His firm has a wide array of legislative and political clients. The firm has worked for Californians for Retirement Security, a public employee union coalition that opposes pension cuts, the Environmental Defense Fund, the Natural Resources Defense Council, Water Foundation, AT&T, Tesla, Californians Against Waste, the California Recycling Coalition. In 2008 and 2016, he served as a delegate to the Democratic National Convention for Hillary Clinton. Maviglio became the campaign manager for Kevin Johnson, Mayor of Sacramento, that year and ran two successful campaigns. Maviglio has also worked on the presidential campaigns of Bill Clinton, Gov. Michael Dukakis and Sen. Gary Hart.

In 2010, Campaigns and Elections listed Maviglio on its list of the top 50 Democratic "influencers" in California. That year, he served as the spokesman for the No-on-23 campaign backed by a coalition of environmental, labor, health and progressive business groups in California. Proposition 23, an attempt by out-of-state oil companies to repeal AB32, was defeated by a 23% margin during the statewide election. Maviglio opposed California Proposition 31, an initiative that would have established a two-year budget cycle for California and made a host of other changes to state and local budgeting in November 2012. Voters defeated the vote by a 21% margin. He served as spokesman for Assembly Speaker John Pérez in September 2013. Maviglio was named on Capitol Weekly’s “Top 100” list for nearly a decade. In 2015 and 2016, he helped lead the effort to pass Proposition 67 “California vs Big Plastic”, a campaign to protect California's plastic bag ban and defeat a rival motion, Proposition 65.

He also led efforts to defeat Tim Draper's “Six Californias” ballot measure and another proposed initiative to divert funds from the state's High-Speed Rail project to build more dams in 2016.

In 2018, he led the effort to defeat Draper's "3 Californias" initiative.

Maviglio was spokesperson for the No on Prop. 10 campaign, notably diverging from the official stance of the California Democratic Party, and currently is spokesperson for the No on Prop. 21 campaign, hence strongly opposing rent control and strongly supporting the Costa-Hawkins Act.

In June 2020, Maviglio gained some notoriety as the landlord of a building on Swann Street in Washington, D.C. which was rented by a man, Rahul Dubey. During the evening of June 2, 2020, Dubey opened his home to shelter demonstrators protesting police brutality in the wake of the murder of George Floyd. Maviglio publicly professed concern about damage to his building and noted further: "I don't mean to disparage the guy, as he's being held up as this good Samaritan, but that also means paying your rent."

== Personal life ==
Steve Maviglio was president, Vice President, Treasurer and Secretary of the Sacramento Natural Foods Cooperative. He was the recipient of the Consumer Cooperative Management Association (CCMA) Award for Board and Owner Service. He also serves on the boards of the Capitol Area Development Authority (CADA) and Sacramento Press Club.

New Hampshire House of Representatives
Preceded by James J. White	Member of the New Hampshire House of Representatives from the 1st Belknap district 1986–1992	Succeeded by Carl R. Johnson; David M. Lawton
