= Società Generale Immobiliare =

Defunct Italian company

Società Generale Immobiliare (SGI; English: The General Company of Real Estate) was once the largest real estate and construction company in Italy. It was founded in Turin in 1862, then moved to Rome in 1870 with the unification of Italy. The company bought some of the pastoral land around Rome, which appreciated in value as the city grew. The company moved into construction, especially after the arrival of Aldo Samaritani (1904–96) in 1933. The company is famous for building residential buildings throughout Italy.

SGI's largest shareholder was formerly the Vatican, with 15% of the shares. Most of the Vatican's holdings in the company were sold during the late 1960s to the Gulf and Western corporation. In 1970, Gulf and Western sold a 50% stake in the Paramount lot to SGI.

SGI is the predecessor of Group SGI which was controlled by Opus Dei during the early 1990s. The company was involved in the Banco Ambrosiano scandal.

SGI is alluded to (as "Internazionale Immobiliare") in The Godfather Part III as part of protagonist Michael Corleone's efforts to legitimize his fortune.

== Famous buildings ==
- Watergate complex, Washington, D.C.
- Rome Cavalieri, a Waldorf Astoria Hotel
