= Geography of Illinois =

Illinois municipalities

Illinois is in the midwestern United States. Surrounding states are Wisconsin to the north, Iowa and Missouri to the west, Kentucky to the east and south, and Indiana to the east. Illinois also borders Michigan, but only via a northeastern water boundary in Lake Michigan. Nearly the entire western boundary of Illinois is the Mississippi River, except for a few areas where the river has changed course. Illinois' southeastern and southern boundary is along the Wabash River and the Ohio River, whereas its northern boundary and much of its eastern boundary are straight survey (longitudinal and latitudinal) lines. Illinois has a maximum north–south distance of 390 miles (630 km) and 210 miles (340 km) east-west. Its total area is 57,918 square miles (150,010 km^{2}).

== Regions of Illinois ==
- Northwest (Moline) – Rock Island, La Salle, Whiteside, Henry, Lee, Bureau, Jo Daviess, Carroll, Mercer, Putnam
- Northern Stateline (Rockford) – Winnebago, Boone, Ogle, Stephenson
- Northeast (Chicago) – Cook, DuPage, Lake, Will, Kane, McHenry, Kendall, Kankakee, DeKalb, Grundy
- West Central (Quincy) – Adams, Knox, McDonough, Hancock, Warren, Pike, Schuyler, Brown, Henderson
- North Central (Peoria) – Peoria, McLean, Tazewell, Woodford, Livingston, Fulton, De Witt, Mason, Marshall, Stark
- East Central (Champaign) – Champaign, Vermilion, Iroquois, Douglas, Piatt, Ford
- Central (Springfield) – Sangamon, Macon, Macoupin, Christian, Morgan, Montgomery, Logan, Shelby, Cass, Menard, Greene, Scott
- Southwest (Belleville) – Madison, St. Clair, Clinton, Monroe, Randolph, Jersey, Bond, Washington, Calhoun
- Southeast (Charleston) – Coles, Marion, Effingham, Fayette, Crawford, Edgar, Richland, Clark, Lawrence, Moultrie, Clay, Cumberland, Jasper
- Southern (Carbondale) – Williamson, Jackson, Franklin, Jefferson, Saline, Perry, Union, Wayne, Massac, White, Johnson, Wabash, Hamilton, Edwards, Pulaski, Gallatin, Alexander, Pope, Hardin

== Statistics ==
- Illinois has a maximum north–south distance of 390 miles (630 km) and 210 miles (340 km) east-west.
- Total area is 57,918 square miles (150,010 km^{2}), ranked 25th in size of the 50 states.
- Water area is 2,325 square miles (6,020 km^{2}); Lake Michigan accounts for most of this.
- Charles Mound in the northwest Driftless Area is the highest point in the state at 1,235 feet (376 m) above sea level.
- The Mississippi River at Cairo, Illinois is the lowest point, at 279 feet (85 m).
- Average elevation is 600 feet (180 m) above sea level.
- McLean County is the largest county in terms of land area (1,184 sq mi.), while Cook County is the largest county in terms of population (5,275,541 as of 2020), and the largest when land and water area are combined.

== Geographical divisions ==
Illinois has three major geographical divisions: Northern, Central, and Southern. Collectively, central and southern Illinois are often referred to within Illinois as "downstate Illinois" but with political developments since World War II "Downstate" now generally refers to all of Illinois outside of the Chicago metro area.

=== Northern Illinois ===
Northern Illinois is dominated by the Chicago metropolitan area, including the city of Chicago, its suburbs, and the adjoining exurban area into which the metropolis is expanding. The "collar counties" are the five counties that surround the centrally located Cook County in the Chicago metropolitan area: DuPage County, Kane County, Lake County, McHenry County, and Will County. The term "Chicagoland" is sometimes used to describe the metro area, including Chicago, its suburbs within Cook County, and the so-called collar counties. The term is said to have been coined by Chicago Tribune publisher Robert R. McCormick. The Chicagoland Chamber of Commerce defines it as all of Cook, and DuPage, Kane, Lake, McHenry and Will counties. The region is cosmopolitan, densely populated, industrialized, and settled by a wide variety of ethnic groups. As defined by the federal government, the Chicago Metropolitan Area includes two counties in Indiana, two counties in Wisconsin, and the following 11 counties in Illinois: Cook, DeKalb, DuPage, Grundy, Kane, Kankakee, Kendall, Lake, LaSalle, McHenry, and Will counties.

The Rockford Metropolitan Area is north-central near Wisconsin, on the Rock River. The Quad Cities Metropolitan Area is on both sides of the Mississippi River separating Illinois from Iowa. The Illinois side includes Henry County, Mercer County, and Rock Island County.

In extreme northwestern Illinois the Driftless Zone, a region of unglaciated and therefore higher and more rugged topography, occupies a small part of the state. Charles Mound, located in this region, is the state's highest elevation above sea level.

=== Central Illinois ===
Southward and westward, the second major division is Central Illinois, an area of mostly flat prairie with the exception of areas along the Illinois and Mississippi rivers that are steeped in hills and bluffs hanging high above the rivers providing commanding views for miles. The western section (west of the Illinois River) was originally part of the Military Tract of 1812 and forms the distinctive western bulge of the state. Central Illinois is characterized by small towns and mid-sized cities. Agriculture, particularly corn and soybeans, figures prominently. Major cities include Peoria, and Springfield (the state capital). The Champaign-Urbana Metropolitan Area is located in the central region of the state and is composed of Champaign, Ford, and Piatt counties.

=== Southern Illinois ===
The third division is Southern Illinois, comprising the area south of U.S. Route 50, and including Little Egypt, near the juncture of the Mississippi River and Ohio River. This region can be distinguished from the other two by its warmer climate, different mix of crops (including cotton farming in the past), more rugged unglaciated topography, as well as small-scale oil deposits and coal mining.

The population in southern Illinois is concentrated in two areas:

- Metro-East is an area east of St. Louis and it includes Jersey, Madison, St. Clair, Macoupin, and parts of Bond and Calhoun from the St. Louis Metropolitan Statistical Area, as well as Clinton County.
- Carbondale, Marion, West Frankfort, Benton, Herrin, Murphysboro, Carterville, and the Johnston City area.

The Shawnee Hills arise in southern Illinois. Illinoian Stage, about 132,000 to 300,000 years before present, climbed the northern face of the Shawnee Hills, but did not reach the summit. Most of the Shawnee Hills is therefore unglaciated.

The floodplain on the Mississippi River from Alton to the Kaskaskia River is the American Bottom, and is the site of the ancient city of Cahokia, and was a region of early French settlement, as well as the site of the first state capital, at Kaskaskia. The extreme southern tip of Illinois is in the Gulf Coastal Plain.

== Political geography ==
The city of Chicago and some of its older suburbs are heavily Democratic. While this tendency has historically been balanced by Republican voters in the suburbs, Democrats have significantly increased their suburban support in the past decade. Central Illinois's largely rural character helps to sustain a largely Republican voting pattern and widespread antipathy toward Chicago. The combination of poorer soil, coal mining and industrialization has caused the southern region to lean Democratic politically, especially in the urbanized region around Saint Louis, Missouri.

Rockford, Illinois is known as a center of liberal "gypsy moth" Republicans.

== Geology ==
Illinois is predominantly covered with soil, hundreds of feet thick in many places. Much of this soil is "Illite", and is the most common type of soil on the planet. The visible geology of the state is mainly Quaternary, with rocks buried deeply. The wealth of the state mainly arises from this abundance of soil and the favorable agrarian conditions it provides.

Illinois is a major coal-producing state. Much of the bedrock surface is of Pennsylvanian age, including "cyclothemes", regular sequences of limestone, shale and coal layers. Newer rocks may have once existed in the State, but these have been removed by repeated epochs of glaciation. Only tiny areas of newer bedrock exist. The chance of finding dinosaur bones in Illinois is unlikely:, the Pennsylvanian rocks were here before the dinosaurs.

Galena, a lead ore, has been mined in the northwest corner of the state. The ore was processed around Peru, Illinois, where river transport was available to bring the ore to a source of coal. About six tons of coal are needed for each ton of ore.

Fluorite, calcium fluoride, is the state mineral. It is mined in the southeastern portion of the state, around Metropolis. Fluorine gas is produced from fluorite. This is used in the production of uranium hexafluoride in Metropolis, Illinois for use at the gaseous diffusion plant in Paducah, Kentucky.

Geodes can be found in the older Mississippian outcroppings along the Mississippi River.

Igneous intrusions are found in the far southern areas of the State. Ages ago North America began to split roughly along the lines of the Ohio and Mississippi Rivers. Igneous rock flowed up into fissures, as a new ocean began to form. Had this continued, Illinois might have resembled the Arabian Peninsula, a broken terrain between two continents. This split, however, failed: the continent reclosed, leaving only a few igneous intrusions, and some oil fields, as evidence that it happened.

North of the Illinois River the bedrock surface is much older Ordovician sandstone. This sandstone yields ancient sand that is very useful in the production of glass, and in making molds for metal castings.

=== Coal ===
The majority of Illinois surface bedrock belongs to the Pennsylvanian period, particularly the downstate region. About 68% of the state has coal-bearing strata of this geologic period. According to the Illinois State Geological Survey, 211 billion tons of bituminous coal are estimated to lie under the surface, having a total heating value greater than the estimated oil deposits in the Arabian Peninsula. However, this coal has a high sulfur content and as such requires special equipment to reduce air pollution.

=== Rivers ===
Illinois is mainly bounded by rivers, and the Illinois River bisects the state. A few rivers, including the Fox and Rock Rivers enter the State from Wisconsin. The Iroquois and Kankakee arise in Indiana, but lose their identity before reaching the Mississippi. The North Fork of the Vermilion River arises in Indiana, but joins the Vermilion, which exits the state before joining the Wabash River in Indiana. Other rivers include the Ohio River, the Kaskaskia River, the Sangamon River and the Chicago River. The Cashe River area in southern Illinois forms the basis for a Ramsar Convention Wetland of International Importance.

=== Groundwater ===
Subsurface water is generally plentiful in Illinois. However, irregular gravel deposits from glaciation can lead to difficulties predicting depth of the water table.

The Mahomet Aquifer is a large aquifer used as a source for public water supply by many communities in Central Illinois.

== Flora and fauna ==
Large mammal species currently found in Illinois include whitetail deer and coyote, with the latter becoming urbanized in the Chicago area, as well as common in the rural areas. Furbearers commonly found include opossum, raccoon, mink, red and gray foxes, and muskrat. Commonly seen lagomorphs include the cottontail rabbit and commonly seen rodents include squirrels. Game birds found include Canada goose, mallard duck, ruffed grouse, wild turkey, and bobwhite quail. The northern cardinal is the official state bird. The state has approximately 300 species of birds, many of which migrate on the Mississippi Flyway. Extensive wetland restoration along the Mississippi River and Illinois River are attracting many species.

About two thirds of the state was originally prairie, with much of the area converted to rowcrop farming, while the southern third of the state remains heavily forested with oak, hickory, and maple. Also, several prairie plants.

Especially in the northern third of the state, intensive agriculture has made some species rare, while population numbers are increasing in the less-developed south. Large mammals generally no longer found in the wild in Illinois include American bison, gray wolf, American black bear, and elk.

== Climate ==
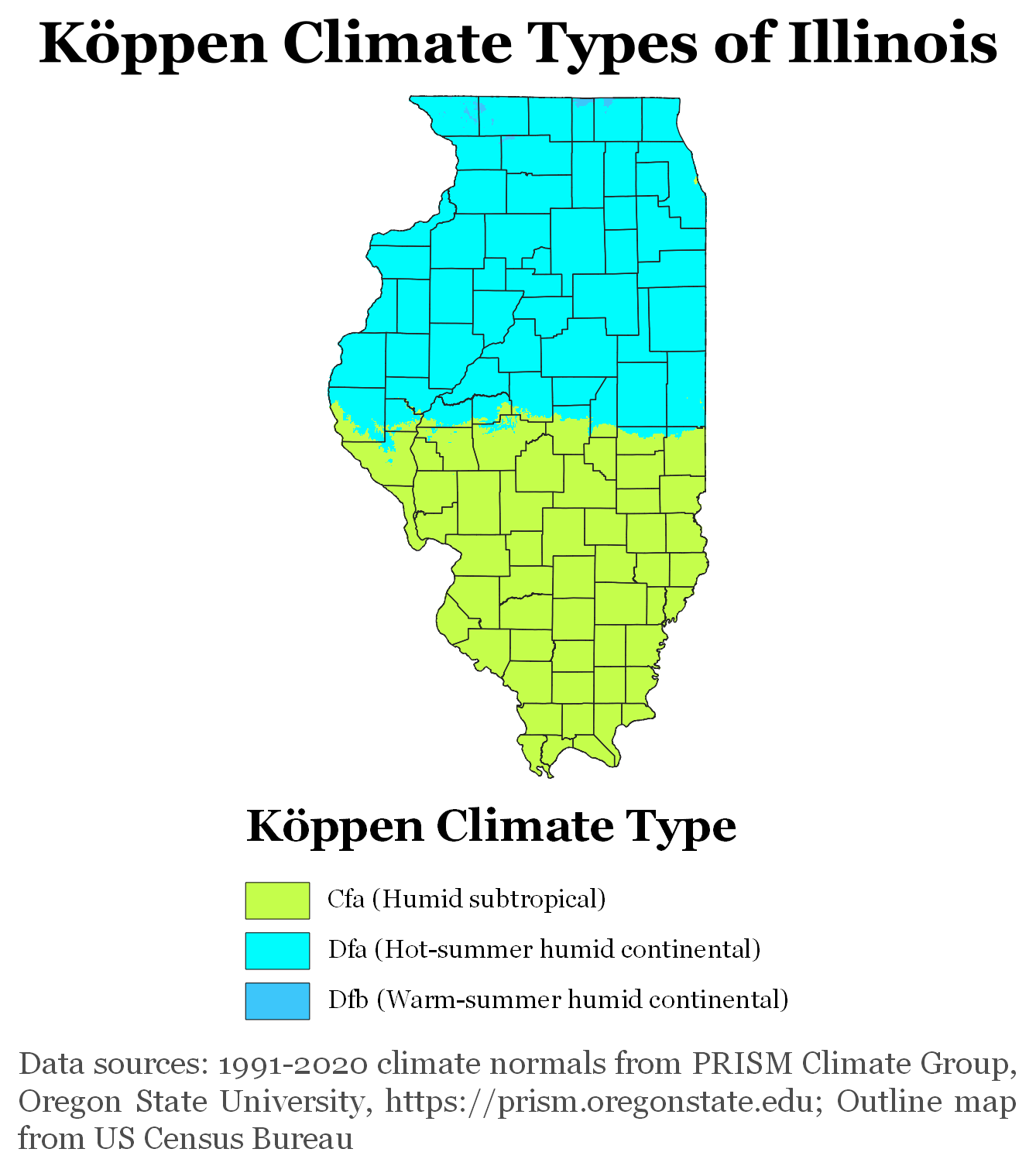
Köppen climate types of Illinois, using 1991-2020 climate normals.

Illinois has a continental climate, with large temperature extremes not moderated by either mountains or oceans. Weather is influenced primarily by cold Canadian Arctic air in the winter, and warm, humid air from the Gulf of Mexico in the summer. High temperatures in the south of the state are about 10 to 12 °F. warmer than the north. Average annual temperature is 47 °F. in the north and 58 °F. in the south. Temperatures greater than 90 °F. occur about 45 days per year in the south, and 12 days per year in the north. Temperatures below zero °F. occur one day or less per year in the south, and 12 days per year in the north. Annual rainfall is 34 inches (860 mm) in the north and 46 inches (1,200 mm) in the south.

Prevailing winds are from the west. Average wind speeds "blowing off the prairie" are greater in the Chicago area. Statewide, the wind speeds average 8 to 12 miles per hour (13 to 19 km/h), and is greater in the winter than in summer.

Snowfall averages 30 inches (760 mm) in the north and 10 inches (250 mm) in the south, although the actual snowfalls vary greatly by year. In some years, southern Illinois receives very little snowfall, and may never get typical winter weather.

Most of the state has four distinct seasons. The southernmost part of the state is heavily forested and the trees are noted for having beautiful fall colors.

Tornadoes are a common hazard, primarily in the central part of the state, with peak months in June and April. Freezing rain is most common in central Illinois.

Climate data for Chicago (Midway International Airport), 1991–2020 normals, (Note: Mean monthly maxima and minima (i.e. the expected highest and lowest temperature readings at any point during the year or given month) calculated based on data at said location from 1991 to 2020.) extremes 1928–present
Month	Jan	Feb	Mar	Apr	May	Jun	Jul	Aug	Sep	Oct	Nov	Dec	Year
Record high °F (°C)	67 (19)	75 (24)	86 (30)	92 (33)	102 (39)	107 (42)	109 (43)	104 (40)	102 (39)	94 (34)	81 (27)	72 (22)	109 (43)
Mean maximum °F (°C)	53.4 (11.9)	57.9 (14.4)	72.0 (22.2)	81.5 (27.5)	89.2 (31.8)	93.9 (34.4)	96.0 (35.6)	94.2 (34.6)	90.8 (32.7)	82.8 (28.2)	68.0 (20.0)	57.5 (14.2)	97.1 (36.2)
Mean daily maximum °F (°C)	32.8 (0.4)	36.8 (2.7)	47.9 (8.8)	60.0 (15.6)	71.5 (21.9)	81.2 (27.3)	85.2 (29.6)	83.1 (28.4)	76.5 (24.7)	63.7 (17.6)	49.6 (9.8)	37.7 (3.2)	60.5 (15.8)
Daily mean °F (°C)	26.2 (−3.2)	29.9 (−1.2)	39.9 (4.4)	50.9 (10.5)	61.9 (16.6)	71.9 (22.2)	76.7 (24.8)	75.0 (23.9)	67.8 (19.9)	55.3 (12.9)	42.4 (5.8)	31.5 (−0.3)	52.4 (11.3)
Mean daily minimum °F (°C)	19.5 (−6.9)	22.9 (−5.1)	32.0 (0.0)	41.7 (5.4)	52.4 (11.3)	62.7 (17.1)	68.1 (20.1)	66.9 (19.4)	59.2 (15.1)	46.8 (8.2)	35.2 (1.8)	25.3 (−3.7)	44.4 (6.9)
Mean minimum °F (°C)	−3 (−19)	3.4 (−15.9)	14.1 (−9.9)	28.2 (−2.1)	39.1 (3.9)	49.3 (9.6)	58.6 (14.8)	57.6 (14.2)	45.0 (7.2)	31.8 (−0.1)	19.7 (−6.8)	5.3 (−14.8)	−6.5 (−21.4)
Record low °F (°C)	−25 (−32)	−20 (−29)	−7 (−22)	10 (−12)	28 (−2)	35 (2)	46 (8)	43 (6)	29 (−2)	20 (−7)	−3 (−19)	−20 (−29)	−25 (−32)
Average precipitation inches (mm)	2.30 (58)	2.12 (54)	2.66 (68)	4.15 (105)	4.75 (121)	4.53 (115)	4.02 (102)	4.10 (104)	3.33 (85)	3.86 (98)	2.73 (69)	2.33 (59)	40.88 (1,038)
Average snowfall inches (cm)	12.5 (32)	10.1 (26)	5.7 (14)	1.0 (2.5)	0.0 (0.0)	0.0 (0.0)	0.0 (0.0)	0.0 (0.0)	0.0 (0.0)	0.1 (0.25)	1.5 (3.8)	7.9 (20)	38.8 (99)
Average precipitation days (≥ 0.01 in)	11.5	9.4	11.1	12.0	12.4	11.1	10.0	9.3	8.4	10.8	10.2	10.8	127.0
Average snowy days (≥ 0.1 in)	8.9	6.4	3.9	0.9	0.0	0.0	0.0	0.0	0.0	0.2	1.6	6.3	28.2
Average ultraviolet index	1	2	4	6	7	9	9	8	6	4	2	1	5
Source 1: NOAA, WRCC
Source 2: Weather Atlas (UV)

Climate data for Chicago (O'Hare Int'l Airport), 1991–2020 normals, extremes 1871–present (Note: Official records for Chicago were kept at various locations in downtown from January 1871 to December 31, 1925, University of Chicago from January 1, 1926 to June 30, 1942, Midway Airport from July 1, 1942 to January 16, 1980, and at O'Hare Airport since January 17, 1980.)
Month	Jan	Feb	Mar	Apr	May	Jun	Jul	Aug	Sep	Oct	Nov	Dec	Year
Record high °F (°C)	67 (19)	75 (24)	88 (31)	91 (33)	98 (37)	104 (40)	105 (41)	102 (39)	101 (38)	94 (34)	81 (27)	71 (22)	105 (41)
Mean maximum °F (°C)	52.3 (11.3)	56.8 (13.8)	71.0 (21.7)	80.9 (27.2)	88.0 (31.1)	93.1 (33.9)	94.9 (34.9)	93.2 (34.0)	89.7 (32.1)	81.7 (27.6)	67.0 (19.4)	56.4 (13.6)	96.0 (35.6)
Mean daily maximum °F (°C)	31.6 (−0.2)	35.7 (2.1)	47.0 (8.3)	59.0 (15.0)	70.5 (21.4)	80.4 (26.9)	84.5 (29.2)	82.5 (28.1)	75.5 (24.2)	62.7 (17.1)	48.4 (9.1)	36.6 (2.6)	59.5 (15.3)
Daily mean °F (°C)	25.2 (−3.8)	28.8 (−1.8)	39.0 (3.9)	49.7 (9.8)	60.6 (15.9)	70.6 (21.4)	75.4 (24.1)	73.8 (23.2)	66.3 (19.1)	54.0 (12.2)	41.3 (5.2)	30.5 (−0.8)	51.3 (10.7)
Mean daily minimum °F (°C)	18.8 (−7.3)	21.8 (−5.7)	31.0 (−0.6)	40.3 (4.6)	50.6 (10.3)	60.8 (16.0)	66.4 (19.1)	65.1 (18.4)	57.1 (13.9)	45.4 (7.4)	34.1 (1.2)	24.4 (−4.2)	43.0 (6.1)
Mean minimum °F (°C)	−4.5 (−20.3)	0.5 (−17.5)	11.8 (−11.2)	25.6 (−3.6)	36.7 (2.6)	46.0 (7.8)	54.5 (12.5)	54.3 (12.4)	41.8 (5.4)	29.7 (−1.3)	17.3 (−8.2)	3.2 (−16.0)	−8.5 (−22.5)
Record low °F (°C)	−27 (−33)	−21 (−29)	−12 (−24)	7 (−14)	27 (−3)	35 (2)	45 (7)	42 (6)	29 (−2)	14 (−10)	−2 (−19)	−25 (−32)	−27 (−33)
Average precipitation inches (mm)	1.99 (51)	1.97 (50)	2.45 (62)	3.75 (95)	4.49 (114)	4.10 (104)	3.71 (94)	4.25 (108)	3.19 (81)	3.43 (87)	2.42 (61)	2.11 (54)	37.86 (962)
Average snowfall inches (cm)	11.3 (29)	10.7 (27)	5.5 (14)	1.3 (3.3)	0.0 (0.0)	0.0 (0.0)	0.0 (0.0)	0.0 (0.0)	0.0 (0.0)	0.2 (0.51)	1.8 (4.6)	7.6 (19)	38.4 (98)
Average extreme snow depth inches (cm)	6.3 (16)	6.3 (16)	4.0 (10)	0.6 (1.5)	0.0 (0.0)	0.0 (0.0)	0.0 (0.0)	0.0 (0.0)	0.0 (0.0)	0.0 (0.0)	1.5 (3.8)	3.9 (9.9)	9.8 (25)
Average precipitation days (≥ 0.01 in)	11.0	9.4	10.8	12.3	12.5	11.1	9.7	9.4	8.5	10.5	10.0	10.6	125.8
Average snowy days (≥ 0.1 in)	8.5	6.4	4.0	1.0	0.0	0.0	0.0	0.0	0.0	0.2	1.6	6.1	27.8
Average relative humidity (%)	72.2	71.6	69.7	64.9	64.1	65.6	68.5	70.7	71.1	68.6	72.5	75.5	69.6
Average dew point °F (°C)	13.6 (−10.2)	17.6 (−8.0)	27.1 (−2.7)	35.8 (2.1)	45.7 (7.6)	55.8 (13.2)	61.7 (16.5)	61.0 (16.1)	53.8 (12.1)	41.7 (5.4)	31.6 (−0.2)	20.1 (−6.6)	38.8 (3.8)
Mean monthly sunshine hours	135.8	136.2	187.0	215.3	281.9	311.4	318.4	283.0	226.6	193.2	113.3	106.3	2,508.4
Percentage possible sunshine	46	46	51	54	62	68	69	66	60	56	38	37	56
Source: NOAA (relative humidity, dew point and sun 1961–1990)

== Border anomalies ==
The Mississippi River is the nominal western boundary of the state, except for locations where the river has changed course. Kaskaskia, Illinois, the first state capital, is now west of the river. The Mississippi, due to a flood, destroyed the old town of Kaskaskia, and occupies what was the lower channel of the Kaskaskia River. A portion of Missouri is east of the river, near Grand Tower, Illinois. Similar "avulsions" are found along the Ohio River border with Kentucky and the Wabash River border with Indiana.

== See also ==
- List of ecoregions in Illinois
