= Separation referendums in Illinois =

County referendums to divide Illinois

Referendums have been held in a number of counties beginning in 2020 with the aim of separating from Cook County. Cook County Counties that held referendums in 2020 Counties that held referendums in 2021 Counties that held referendums in 2022 (Madison County, marked by a dotted border, had two townships hold referendums in 2022, although the entire county held a referendum in 2024) Counties that held referendums in 2024 Counties that held referendums in 2026

Beginning in 2020, a number of counties of Illinois have held referendums relating to the separation of Cook County, and more specifically its city of Chicago, from the rest of Illinois. This might be achieved by splitting Chicago and some nearby areas off as a new state, separating themselves from Illinois to form a new state, or separating from Illinois and joining a neighboring state. The counties that have held these referendums tend to be thinly populated rural areas, mostly in the state's southeast. Advocates state that the dominance of Cook County in state politics means that such areas are ignored. These referendums are not legally binding, and a division of the state is ultimately unlikely. The referendums and related legislation have thus sometimes been used to raise awareness of other political issues, and make political statements.

The modern politics of Illinois is dominated by Cook County, as it contains 40% of the state's population. This has made evident a strong urban–rural political divide, with the Democratic Party-leaning Cook County residents holding differing views on a number of issues to the more Republican Party-leaning rural residents. The state also has a long history of regional cultural differences, especially between Chicago and the rest of Illinois, which is referred to as "downstate".

While proposals to divide Illinois are not new, the current series of "separation referendums" were prompted by the close 2010 Illinois gubernatorial election, in which the winner, Pat Quinn, won only four counties, despite winning a plurality of overall votes. A bill to separate Chicago from the rest of Illinois was subsequently presented to the Illinois House of Representatives, but did not progress. An organization named "New Illinois" was formed in 2018 to advocate for separation. In 2019 a new resolution for separation was introduced to the House, which also did not proceed to a vote.

The first referendums on the county level occurred in March 2020, occurring alongside state primary elections. This initial three was soon followed by 20 more in November, which were held alongside the 2020 Illinois elections. One county held a referendum in 2021, while the 2022 Illinois elections saw referendums held in two more counties and two townships of a third. This third county and six others held referendums alongside the 2024 Illinois elections.

== Background ==
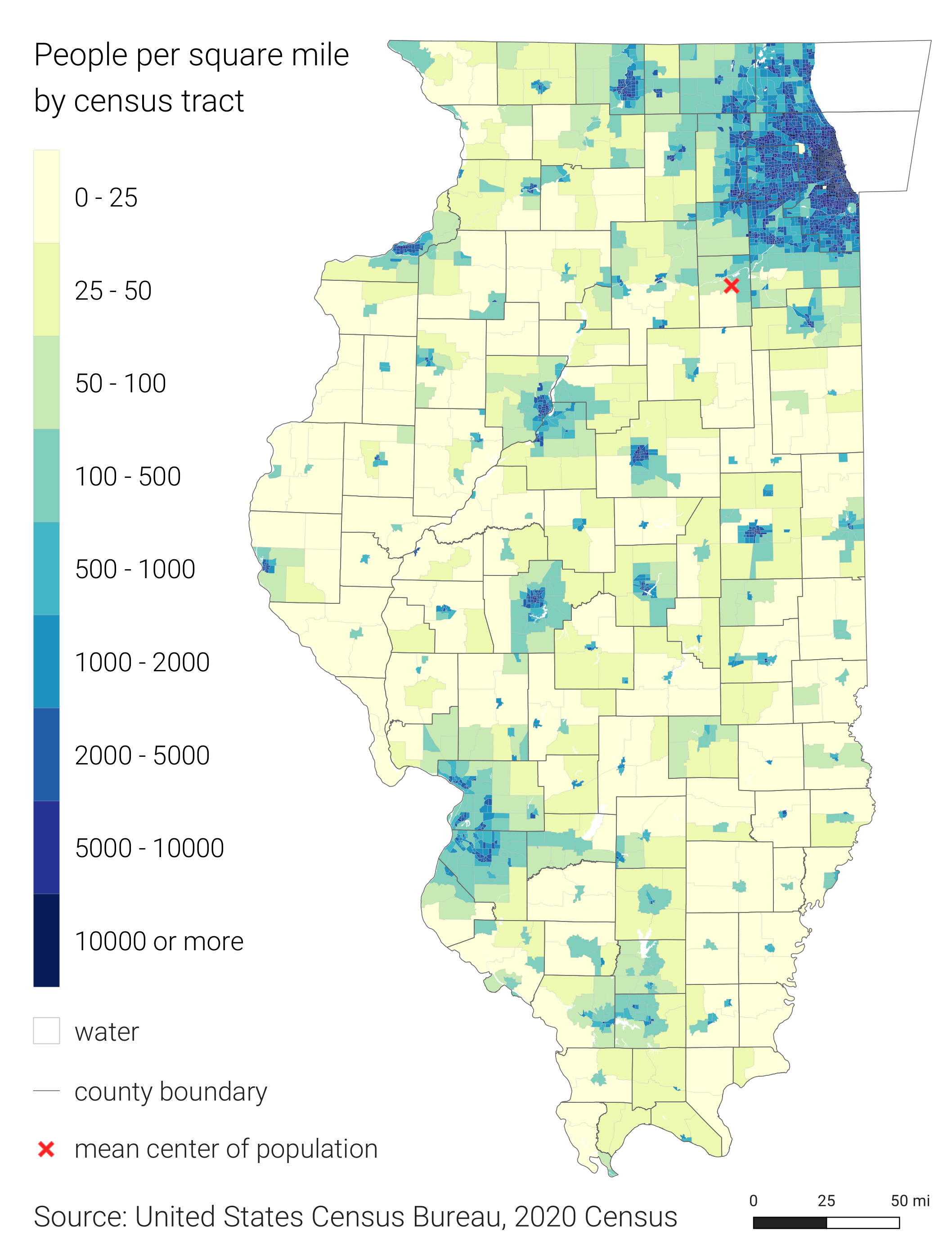
Around 40% of the population of Illinois live in the northeast Cook County alone, and 75% live within the wider Chicago metropolitan area. (Figures from 2020)

The population of the state of Illinois is heavily concentrated in Cook County, including the city of Chicago, which is the third most populous city in the U.S. Around 40% of the Illinois population of lives in Cook County, and the wider Chicago metropolitan area holds about 75% of the state's population, and supports an equivalent proportion of the state's economy. In total Illinois has 102 counties, including Cook County.

There are longstanding historical and cultural differences between Southern Illinois and Chicago. The south was settled first, but was later eclipsed by Chicago. Chicago has developed its own identity and has cultural links to the Great Lakes region and New England, where many of the city's first settlers hailed from, while Southern Illinois has cultural links to the Upland South. There have been many historical proposals to divide Illinois, either to join neighboring states or to create a new one, although none succeeded. In the early 20th century, legislators from outside of Chicago (an area referred to as "downstate") refused to undertake constitutionally required redistricting following the 1910 and 1920 censuses, not wanting to lose political power to the growing city of Chicago. Following the 1964 Reynolds v. Sims Supreme Court case, state legislative districts are required to have roughly equal population sizes.

Modern politics also has a strong urban–rural political divide, with urban residents more likely to vote for the Democratic Party and rural residents more likely to vote for the Republican Party. Combined with the urban population being heavily concentrated in just one county, this political divide has led to feelings in downstate rural areas that state politics reflects only the views of Cook County. Disputes exist around the state budget, immigration, the minimum wage, gun laws, and the response to COVID-19. The divides were strong enough to cause a two-year budget impasse from 2015 to 2017. State legislation is seen by advocates of secession as being tailored for Chicago, to the detriment of other areas of the state. It is also often believed that resources are distributed in favor of Chicago, although the actual funding of downstate areas sees more money given by the state than is paid in tax. Such divisions resemble similar urban–rural divides elsewhere in the United States.

No U.S. state has been divided since West Virginia was separated from Virginia due to unique circumstances emerging during the American Civil War. Advocates see the 1819 vote to separate the District of Maine from Massachusetts as a potential model. The legality of such an action in the current day has been questioned due to precedents such as the 1907 Hunter v. City of Pittsburgh decision, especially without the consent of the state involved. Some advocates have stated that a large majority of counties passing such referendums would compel the state legislature to engage with them. Creating a new state would also require the consent of the national legislature. Separation also faces the challenge of getting all counties on board; it is unlikely that the five collar counties surrounding Cook County (DuPage County, Kane County, Lake County, McHenry County, and Will County) would want to be separated from Chicago.

The winner of the 2010 Illinois gubernatorial election, Democrat Pat Quinn, received a majority in just four counties. However, as this included Cook County, he won an overall majority of the population. Following this, House Representative Bill Mitchell introduced a bill to the Illinois House of Representatives seeking to separate Cook County from the rest of the state. The bill was adjourned indefinitely in January 2013. A poll conducted by the Paul Simon Public Policy Institute in 2020 found support for splitting Chicago from downstate to be supported by around half of Republican respondents, while being rejected by almost all Democrats; of the state's population overall, 12% somewhat opposed, and 54% strongly opposed (a combined 66%).

The idea of holding non-binding votes calling for a discussion on dividing Illinois, sometimes referred to as "separation referendums", has become a common tactic for expressing the desire to be separated from Chicago. These can by placed on ballots by county boards, or by citizen petitions. John Jackson of Southern Illinois University Carbondale's Paul Simon Public Policy Institute has stated that such referendums are more a symbolic statement of discontent rather than practical or viable proposals. Some advocates see the quantification of discontent as an achievement in itself, even if the passed referendums do not succeed in splitting the state. Others have used such legislation to try and draw attention to issues such as economic diversity.

In 2018, a 501(c)(4) non-profit organization named "New Illinois" was founded to promote the separation of downstate counties from the rest of the state. The group's founder and chairperson, G.H. Merrit, is a resident of Lake County, north of Chicago.

In 2019, a resolution to divide the state was introduced to the Illinois General Assembly by Brad Halbrook, a Republican legislator from Shelby County. The resolution called for Chicago to be declared the 51st state, citing what Halbrook called Democrats' "overreaching" stances on issues such as abortion, guns, immigration, debt, pensions, Medicaid spending, property taxes, green energy, and workers’ compensation, among others, and received eight Republican co-sponsors. This resolution did not have the approval of the Speaker of the House, Michael Madigan, and so did not proceed to a vote. Republican state senator Daphne Jordan introduced legislation calling for a study of the economic impact of a potential split.

== 2020 elections ==
Shall Moultrie County collaborate in discussions with the remaining 101 counties of the State of Illinois, with the exception of Cook County, the possibility of forming a new state and ultimately seeking admission to the Federal Union as the 51st state, pursuant to the provisions of the United States Constitution?

— Ballot question for Moultrie County in 2020

In March 2020, Effingham County, Fayette County, and Jefferson County held and passed separation referendums alongside political primary votes. Another 20 counties held and passed separation referendums alongside the November 2020 Illinois elections. The 20 counties that held and passed referendums in November 2020 were:

- Bond County
- Christian County
- Clark County
- Clay County
- Crawford County
- Cumberland County
- Edwards County
- Hancock County
- Jasper County
- Johnson County
- Lawrence County
- Marion County
- Massac County
- Moultrie County
- Pope County
- Richland County
- Shelby County
- Wabash County
- Wayne County
- White County

Edgar County and Hardin County had referendum questions approved, but due to clerk errors the referendums were not held. Edgar County held and passed a referendum in April 2021.

== 2022 elections ==
Shall the board of Brown County correspond with the boards of the other counties of Illinois outside of Cook County about the possibility of separating from Cook County to form a new state, and to seek admission to the union as such, subject to the approval of the people?

— Ballot question for Brown County in 2022

Alongside the 2022 Illinois elections, separation referendums were held in Brown County (passing with 1,444 votes for to 441 against), Hardin County, and the northeast of Madison County (Leef Township and New Douglas Township, in total 213 votes for out of 285).

In May 2023, Governor JB Pritzker stated his opposition to separation referendums. In October 2023, Illinois Attorney General Kwame Raoul released a statement on the matter, saying that the Constitution of Illinois did not allow for counties to secede, and that any separation referendums were legally non-binding. This statement was sent to officials in Jersey County, where County board member Eric Ivers raised the idea of joining Missouri.

== 2024 elections ==
Shall the board of [the county] correspond with the boards of other counties of Illinois, outside of Cook County, about the possibility of separating from Cook County to form a new state and to seek admission to the Union as such, subject to the approval of the people?

— Standard ballot question for the seven counties with referendums in 2024

Alongside the 2024 Illinois elections, separation referendums were held and passed in seven counties: Calhoun County, Clinton County, Greene County, Iroquois County, Jersey County, Madison County, and Perry County. The closest result was in Madison County, which voted 56.5% in favor. Six of these were in the southwest, with some being part of the Metro East conglomeration that surrounds the Missouri city of St. Louis. Madison County was the first suburban county to pass a separation referendum, and had a much higher population than other counties that had held successful referendums. In addition to this, it was reported that at least 48 counties had committees looking into separation.

Republican representative and separation supporter Charles Meier introduced a resolution to change the Illinois constitution so that the Illinois Senate would be determined by counties, with each senator representing 3 counties plus a senator for each single counties with a population of 1 million, rather than senators being allocated by population as is currently done. This was proposed as an alternative to separation, which Meier viewed as unlikely to succeed.

== 2026 elections ==
The 2026 Illinois elections saw eleven additional counties pass secession referendums, the closest being McDonough County with 56.7% voting in favor. Over half of these were from the west side of the state, like Henderson County, Macoupin County, McDonough County, Monroe County, Warren County, and Washington County. These were nearby either Burlington, Iowa or St. Louis. The rest of the counties, being Coles County, Piatt County, Saline County, Gallatin County, Hamilton County are found in the Wabash Valley region within Indiana.

== Legislation ==
=== Indiana ===
In January 2025, legislators in the neighboring state of Indiana, including Speaker of the Indiana House of Representatives Todd Huston, formally proposed annexing the 33 counties in Illinois that had voted to secede. In proposed House Bill No. 1008, an "Indiana-Illinois Boundary Adjustment Commission" would be created to discuss this. This commission would require similar legislation to be passed in Illinois. Illinois governor Pritzker rejected the idea. House Bill 1500, which would create the commission from the Illinois side, was submitted to the Illinois House of Representatives by Brad Halbrook on January 28. The Indiana legislation was passed by the Indiana House of Representatives on February 20, and sent to the state's Senate. The bill later passed through the Senate, with amendments approved by the House and was sent to the governor, who signed it on May 1.

The Indiana-Illinois Boundary Adjustment Commission met for the first time in October 2025 with panel members from Indiana. The Illinois government did not send Illinois panel members.

=== Iowa ===
In February 2026, a bill was proposed in Iowa to establish a committee to study the issue, but it did not make progress.

== Criticism ==
Some advocates of separation claim that the rest of the state sends their tax dollars to support Chicago; however this is false. Studies have consistently shown that "downstate" counties disproportionately receive more state funding than Chicago and its surrounding suburbs. One such study from 2013 found that, for every dollar residents paid in taxes, Southern Illinois receives $2.81 in state funds, whereas Cook County receives 90 cents, and the "collar counties" receive just 53 cents on the dollar. James Krohe Jr., author of Corn Kings and One-Horse Thieves: A Plain-Spoken History of Mid-Illinois, told the Chicago Tribune, "Great swaths of downstate are dying, demographically and economically; parts of the region remain viable only because assorted transfers of wealth from greater Chicago and Washington sustain it in the form of social security and disability checks, crop supports, and university and prison funding."

La Shawn Ford, a state legislator from Chicago, who has been described as "the only Democrat willing to discuss separation", is opposed to the idea on economic grounds, but has also said he believes there is racial element of the separation movement as well. Ford told NPR, "I don't think that it's overwhelming the issue, but I do think that people are aggravated about Black people. What you see televised, the crime in Chicago, that becomes a punching bag, and people start saying, see, all of our tax dollars are being wasted in Chicago," although he empathized with those from Southern Illinois who feel like they are "in the minority."

Kathy Cramer, a political scientist from the University of Wisconsin at Madison, has said that a "tinge of racism" is essentially unavoidable "when you’re talking secession", telling the Detroit News, "I understand the argument that this is not a racial argument. [...] But then you say we’re going to excise the portion of the state with the highest percentage of people of color in it. Because we are so segregated, when you talk about those people in the city, by definition you are often talking about people of color."

G.H. Merritt, founder of the group New Illinois, is opposed to Illinois's status as a Sanctuary State, arguing that "a state in financial crisis can’t afford to spend on schools and services for those who are here without legal permission" and that the sanctuary policy "puts our state in rebellion to the federal government." However, Merritt maintains that her organization and the broader separation movement are not based in racism; "we are not a white supremacist movement."

== See also ==
- 51st state
- Forgottonia
- Jefferson (proposed Pacific state)
- Lincoln (proposed Northwestern state)
- State of Liberty
