= Partition and secession in the United States =

Partition and secession in the United States may refer to:

- Secession in the United States
- List of U.S. state partition proposals
