= Western Kansas =

Western Kansas may refer to:

- The western part of Kansas
- West Kansas, proposed state
- Episcopal Diocese of Western Kansas
