= List of state partition proposals in the United States =

Historical U.S. state partition proposals

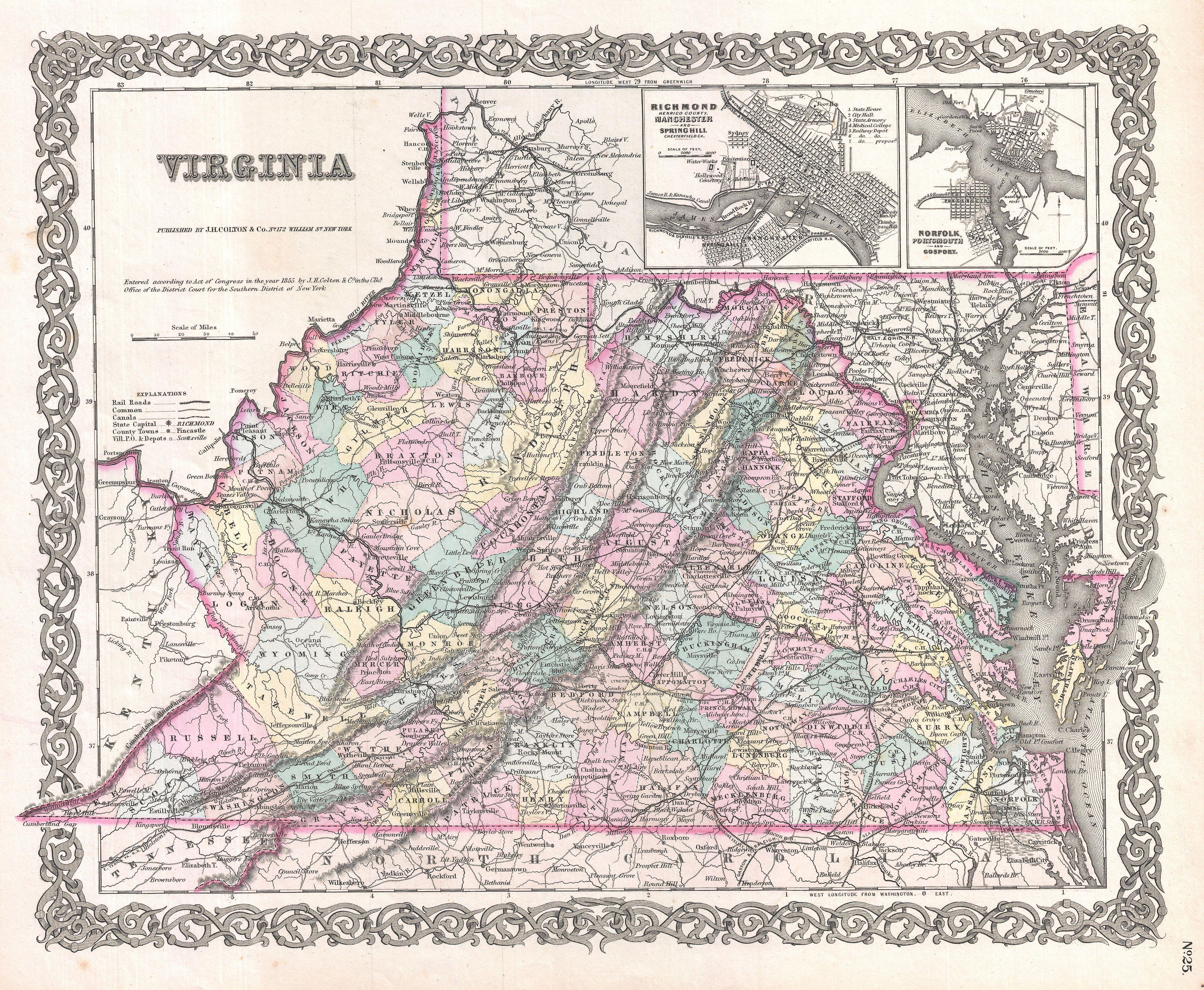
1855 J. H. Colton Company map of Virginia that predates the West Virginia partition by seven years.

Numerous state partition proposals have been put forward since the 1776 establishment of the United States that would partition an existing U.S. state or states so that a particular region might either join another state or create a new state. Article IV, Section 3, Clause 1 of the United States Constitution, (Note: The Constitution took effect for all 13 colonies between 1789 and 1790.) often called the New States Clause, grants to the United States Congress the authority to admit new states into the United States beyond the thirteen that existed when the Constitution went into effect (June 21, 1788, after ratification by nine of the thirteen states). It also includes a stipulation originally designed to give Eastern states that still had Western land claims, which included Virginia, North Carolina, and Georgia, a veto over whether their western counties could become states.

New States may be admitted by the Congress into this Union; but no new State shall be formed or erected within the Jurisdiction of any other State; nor any State be formed by the Junction of two or more States, or Parts of States, without the Consent of the Legislatures of the States concerned as well as of the Congress.

The clause has served the same function since then whenever a proposal to partition an existing state or states has come before Congress. New breakaway states are permitted to join the Union only with the proper consents. Of the 37 states admitted to the Union by Congress, three were set off from an already existing state:

- Kentucky – 1792, was a part of Virginia
- Maine – 1820, was a part of Massachusetts
- West Virginia – 1863, was a part of Virginia

Another state that may fit into this category is Vermont, which existed as a de facto but unrecognized sovereign state from 1777 to 1791. The region had been a subject of a territorial dispute between New York and New Hampshire during the colonial period, which royal authorities had resolved in favor of New York. As the State of New York continued to claim Vermont's territory under that ruling after independence, the Continental Congress never recognized Vermont as an independent state. In 1790, after negotiating the common boundary between the two states and Vermont agreeing to pay New York $30,000, New York relinquished its land grant claim and consented to Vermont becoming part of the Union. Vasan Kesavan and Michael Stokes Paulsen assert that "although Vermont was admitted into the Union with New York's consent, it is not at all clear that New York's consent was constitutionally necessary. While Vermont was within the territory claimed by New York, the preponderance of evidence suggests that Vermont was not within the jurisdiction of New York."

A pair of states that are already partitioned from each other may relocate the state boundary they share, or trade any other territory, by permission of Congress, by interstate compact pursuant to Article I, Section 10 of the United States Constitution. This has occurred dozens of times in US history, but, with a few exceptions such as Boston Corner, has only been used to transfer small tracts of territory such as mountainsides, portions of rivers, dams, and bridges, or farmland that, by avulsion, suddenly becomes attached to the river bank of another state on the opposite side of a shifting river. Disposition of a state's own territory is a reserved power of a state under the Tenth Amendment to the US Constitution. Once approved by Congress, the interstate compact supersedes the state lines described by the act of admission of that state, and, as federal law, is supreme over descriptions of state boundaries found in state constitutions. The transfer occurs in a single step, rather than by a two-step process of secession (or cession) followed by annexation. The most recent example was in 1999, when Congress approved an interstate compact between Missouri and Nebraska which exchanged farmland along the banks of certain stretches of the Missouri River.

The following is a list of substantive proposals, both successful and unsuccessful, put forward since the nation's founding to partition or set off a portion of an existing U.S. state or states to create a new state. This list also includes proposals to relocate state lines across significant populated areas. Proposals to secede from the Union and proposals to create states from either organized incorporated or unorganized U.S. territories are not included. Land cessions made by several individual states to the federal government in the 18th and the 19th centuries also are not listed.

== Alabama ==
- Winston County considered seceding from the state of Alabama in order to remain neutral during the Civil War. This led pro-confederate Richard Payne to call them the "Free State of Winston" or the Republic of Winston.

== Arizona ==
- In February 2011, Tucson politicians and activists formed the group "Start our State," to advocate secession for Pima County and other southern counties to create a state called "Baja Arizona". The group wanted the Pima County Board of Supervisors to put the issue on the 2012 ballot, but it was rejected by the board due to lack of authority, so the group circulated petitions. Interest in secession grew when Republican governor Jan Brewer and her allies enacted Arizona SB 1070, regarding illegal immigration. Furthermore, the state had passed laws affecting Tucson elections and how the city bids for public works projects.

== California ==
There have been over two hundred and twenty proposals for splitting up California, since it became a State in 1850.

== Colorado ==
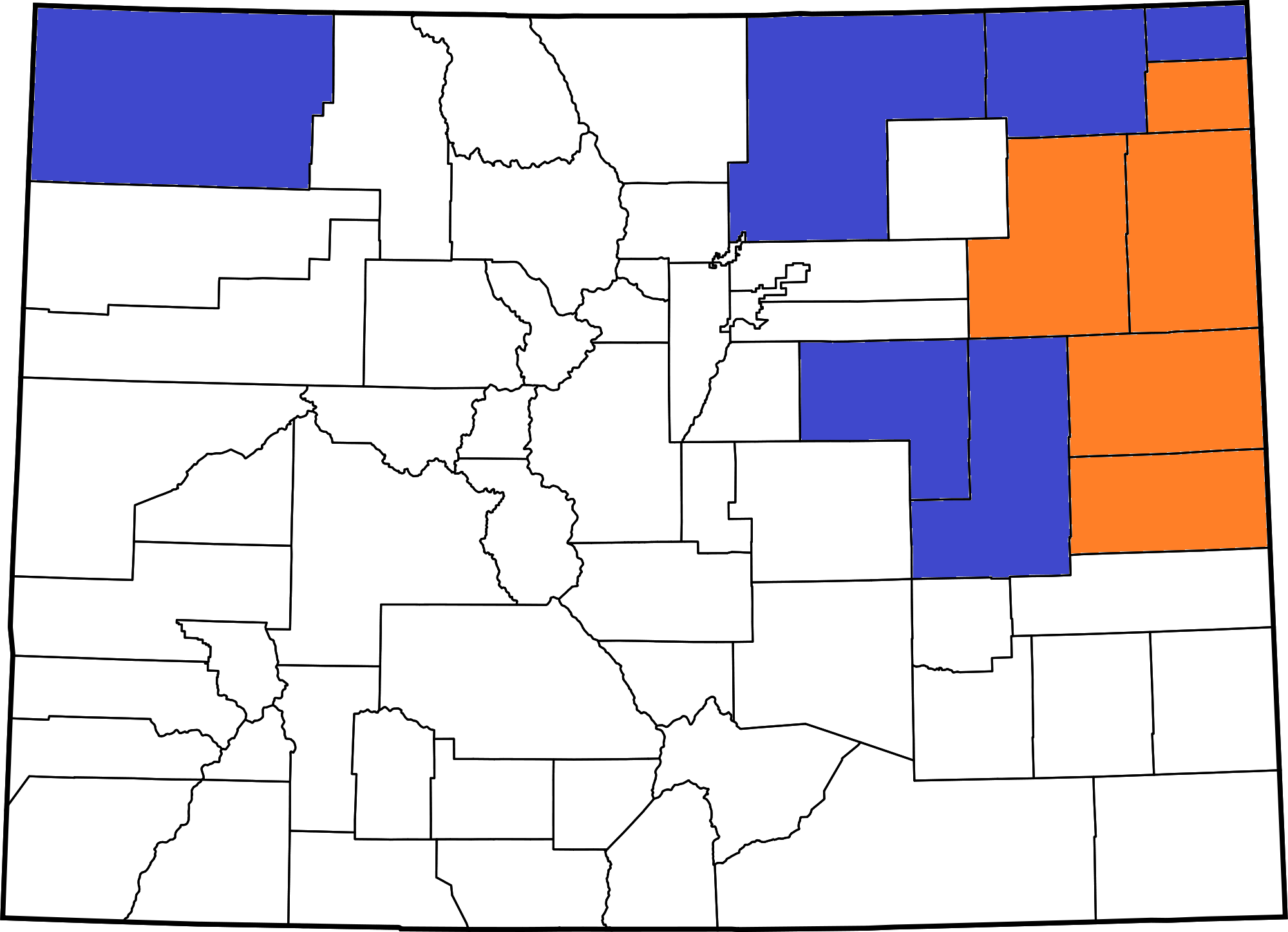
2013 election results: counties in orange voted to separate from Colorado, while counties in blue rejected the idea.

- In the mid-1930s, the Walsenburg World-Independent proposed that Huerfano County secede from the state. This was a pet project of Sam T. Taylor, a sports editor, who went on to become a long-serving state senator, continuing to pursue the idea unsuccessfully.
- In 1973, nearby Costilla County had expressed interest in seceding from Colorado and joining New Mexico.
- On June 6, 2013, commissioners in Weld County announced a proposal to secede with seven other counties to form the state of North Colorado, citing concerns with state policy and recently enacted legislation relating to the region's main economic drivers, including agriculture and energy. The bid was motivated by a belief that the urban population centers of the State weren't concerned with the economic interests of more rural areas. The commissioners stated that they would hold public meetings to gather input before crafting a ballot initiative by August 1, and that the proposal had aroused preliminary interest from fellow commissioners in Morgan, Logan, Sedgwick, Phillips, Washington, Yuma and Kit Carson counties. Eleven counties were involved in the partition movement by election day, though Moffat County was looking into joining Wyoming rather than North Colorado. Voters rejected partition in six of the eleven counties, including Weld and Moffat, and supported it (without binding authority) in five.

== Florida ==
- Politicians in the South Florida metropolitan area have made proposals to split Florida into two states, North Florida and South Florida. One such proposal was made in 2008 by the North Lauderdale commissioners. The proposal was revived in 2014 when South Miami City Commission passed a South Florida state resolution on October 7 and sent it to counties in the proposed state's area.

== Georgia ==
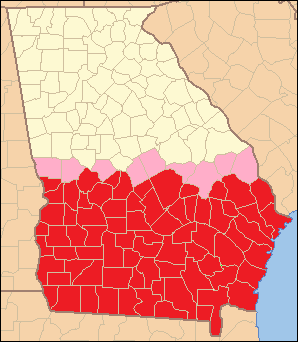
Pierce County's proposed "State of South Georgia" Counties south of Macon Counties level with Macon that extend significantly south

- The Pierce County Republican Party placed a question on the county's May 2018 primary ballot asking Republican voters if they wanted all Georgia counties south of Macon to join to “form the 51st state of South Georgia”. The question failed with only 27% of voters agreeing with it.

== Idaho ==
- In the mid and late 1860s, there was a proposal centered on Lewiston in northern Idaho for the Territory of Columbia to be formed in the Inland Northwest from parts of what is now eastern Washington, northern Idaho and western Montana.
- Longstanding political rivalry along with geographic isolation led to proposals in the early 20th century that portions of northern Idaho and eastern Washington be united into a new state named Lincoln.
- In 2020, "Move Oregon's Border for a Greater Idaho" proposed breaking off most of Oregon's area and some of Northern California and join it with Idaho. Even if passed by voters, it would still need approval from all three state legislatures. In 2021, five counties in eastern Oregon voted to "require county officials to take steps to promote" adding the counties to Idaho. In May 2022, voters in Douglas and Josephine counties rejected an advisory vote, causing the proponents to scale back the scope of the proposal and issue a “less ambitious” map. The reduced scope includes only eastern Oregon, does not include any California territory, and only includes a little more than a third of the original map's inhabitants. Eleven Oregon counties have approved some version of the proposal. In February, 2023, the House State Affairs committee of the Idaho House of Representatives approved a resolution to authorize the legislature to discuss moving the state border with Oregon lawmakers.

== Illinois ==
- Between 1840 and 1842, several northern counties in Illinois, including Jo Daviess County, Stephenson County, Winnebago County and Boone County, voted to reattach to Wisconsin, from which the counties were ceded to Illinois by Congress in 1818. The split was precipitated by the mutual antagonism between northerners and southerners due to social and political differences. The split was never realized due to lack of support from Chicago and Cook County, as the benefits of the Illinois and Michigan Canal linking northern to central and southern Illinois outweighed secession.
- In 1861, the southern region of Illinois, known as Little Egypt, proposed secession due to cultural and political differences from Chicago and much of Central and Northern Illinois.
- In 1925, Cook County considered secession to create the state of Chicago.
- In the early 1970s, residents in western Illinois were upset over the allocation of state funds for transportation, prompting a student at Western Illinois University to declare 16 counties the Republic of Forgottonia. Although the declaration was meant to be a joke, the secession idea was picked up by the Western Illinois Regional Council, until State Representative Doug Kane showed that the counties had received funding that was more than what they paid in state taxes.
- In November 2011, State Representatives Bill Mitchell and Adam Brown introduced a proposal to make Cook County a state of its own. They felt that all of Illinois outside of Cook County should become a separate state, due to Chicago's "dictating its views" to the rest of the state.
- On February 7, 2019, State Representative Brad Halbrook, with co-sponsors Representatives Chris Miller and Darren Bailey, filed a resolution that urges the United States Congress to declare the City of Chicago the 51st state of the United States of America and separate it from the rest of Illinois.
- At various times from 2020 to 2024, 33 counties held referendums on beginning discussions to secede from the state. In 2025, lawmakers in Indiana proposed annexing these counties.

== Kansas ==
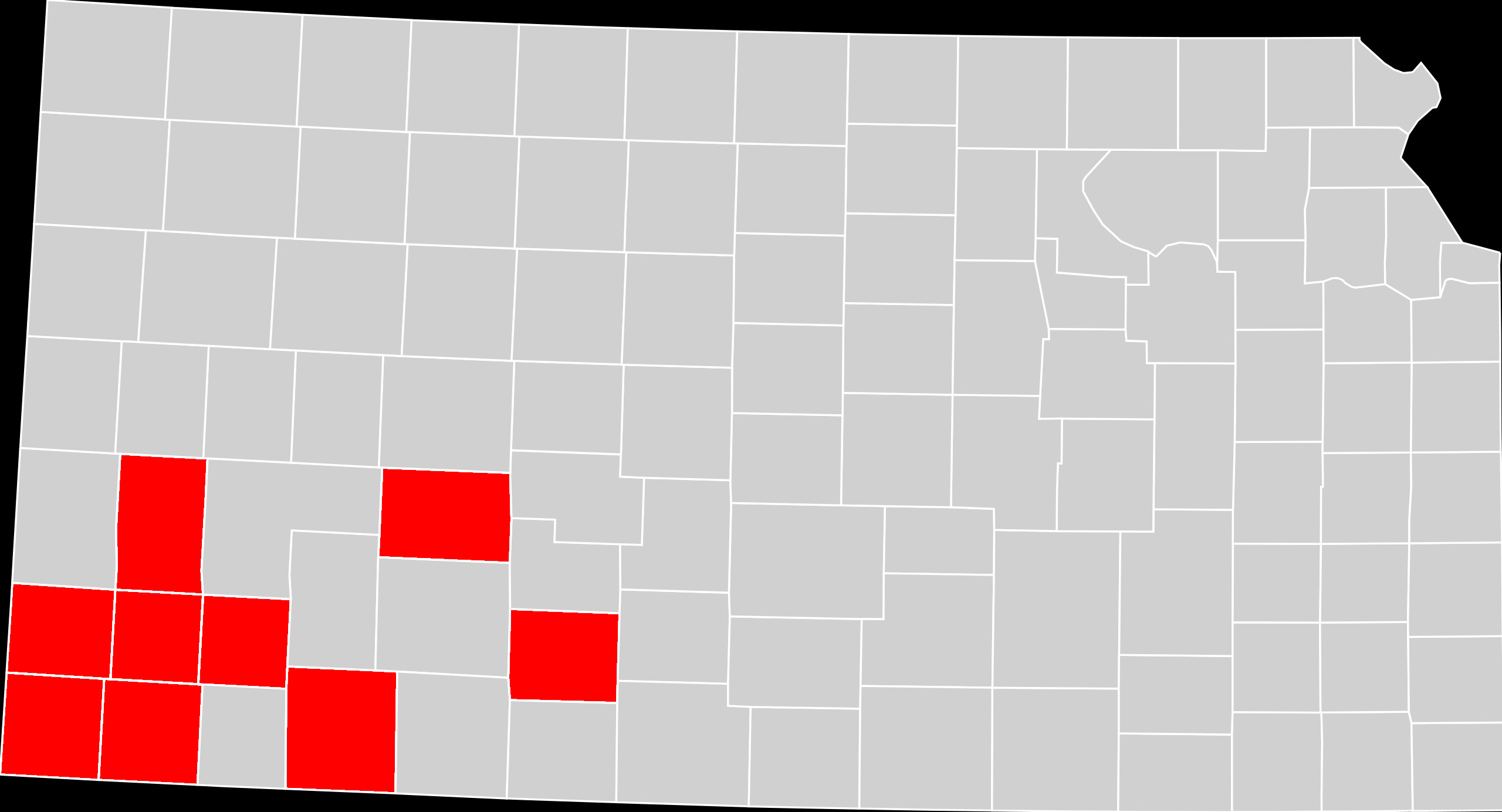
The counties that voted to form West Kansas

- In 1992, a group in southwestern Kansas advocated the secession of a number of counties in that region from the state. Nominally headed by Don O. Concannon, former Chairman of the Kansas Republican Party and gubernatorial candidate from Hugoton, the group gave the new state the name "West Kansas", a state bird (pheasant), and a state flower (yucca). The proposal was in reaction to laws raising real estate taxes, and shifting state education funding away from rural school districts and into more urban areas. Though organizers arranged for a series of straw polls that demonstrated widespread support for secession in nine counties, the movement died out by the mid-1990s.

== Kentucky ==
- On November 20, 1861, Confederate sympathizers, calling themselves the "Convention of the People of Kentucky", met in Russellville to pass an Ordinance of Secession for the region. This established the Confederate government of Kentucky, which was recognized by the Confederacy. Its capital was Bowling Green.

== Maine ==
- Maine was initially part of the Commonwealth of Massachusetts before being admitted to the Union as a state in 1820. However, its boundary with British North America (now Canada) had been in dispute for several decades. In 1827, John Baker unilaterally declared the disputed territory (now part of Aroostook County) to be the "Republic of Madawaska". The declaration was rejected by Maine in 1831. Following the undeclared Aroostook War in 1838–1839, the United States and United Kingdom signed the Webster–Ashburton Treaty on August 9, 1842, to settle the border issue.
- In 1998 and again in 2005, state representative Henry Joy proposed legislation to partition Maine into northern and southern states. He cited concern for the rural northern part, encompassing Maine's 2nd congressional district, being affected by "anti-business policies" and "overzealous environmental safeguards". Reflecting his political opinion of the trends there, Joy suggested the southern half be named "Northern Massachusetts" and the northern half remain "Maine", though others have suggested "Acadia" for the northern half.

== Maryland ==
- Westsylvania, proposed during the American Revolution, would have been created from parts of Pennsylvania and Virginia and a small part of Maryland. Most of Westsylvania would later form the modern state of West Virginia.
- In 1998, state legislator Richard F. Colburn proposed to the Maryland General Assembly that a referendum be held to allow nine counties representing the Eastern Shore to secede from the state. They would invite counties from Delaware and Virginia to form the state of Delmarva.
- In September 2009, Frederick County Commissioner John L. Thompson Jr. proposed that the county secede from Maryland because the county pays more to state government in taxes than it receives in services and benefits. The proposal was rejected by the other commissioners in the county.
- In February 2014, it was reported that residents from Western Maryland started petitions to form a new state, citing taxes and gun control as issues. Possible names for such a proposed state included Liberty, Antietam, Appalachia, and Augusta.
- In October 2021, six Republican lawmakers from Garrett, Allegany, and Washington Counties in Western Maryland sent a letter to the legislative leaders of West Virginia to ask if said counties seceded from Maryland, could they be annexed into West Virginia.
- In August 2026, Tom Hutchinson proposed an amendment for 9 Eastern Shore counties to vote to secede and form a new state called Mardelva. He also proposed for areas of Lower Delaware and Virginia's Eastern Shore to join. A flag created by Senator Richard F. Colburn in 1998 was shown on the floor of the Maryland House of Delegates. The amendment was rejected by voice vote.

== Massachusetts ==
- The state's exclave District of Maine had proposed secession multiple times in the early 19th century. Long-standing disagreements over land speculation and settlements led Maine residents and their allies in Massachusetts proper to force an 1807 vote in the Massachusetts General Court on permitting Maine to separate; the vote failed. Separatist sentiment in Maine was stoked during the War of 1812 when pro-British Massachusetts merchants opposed the war, and refused to defend Maine from British invaders. Finally, on June 19, 1819, the Massachusetts General Court passed enabling legislation separating the "District of Maine" from the rest of the state (an action approved by the voters in Maine on July 19, 1819, by 17,001 to 7,132). Then, on February 25, 1820, the court passed a follow-up measure officially accepting the fact of Maine's imminent statehood. Maine became the 23rd state on March 15, 1820, as part of the Missouri Compromise, which also geographically limited the spread of slavery and enabled the admission to statehood of Missouri the following year.
- During the abolitionist era some supporters of William Lloyd Garrison sought the secession of Essex County from the state.
- Boston Corner, in the southwestern corner of the state, was ceded to the state of New York in 1857, due to Massachusetts being unable to administer the hamlet.
- A 1919 tax-protest proposal filed in the state legislature would have created an independent State of Boston.
- In 1977, the islands of Martha's Vineyard, Nantucket, and the Elizabeth Islands proposed to separate from Massachusetts because of a redistricting bill that would have deprived Dukes County, consisting of Martha's Vineyard and the Elizabeth Islands, and Nantucket County of separate representation in the General Court. At local town meetings, culminating in the All-Island Selectmen's Association Conference, residents and community leaders voted in favor of secession with an "overwhelming majority". When the Nantucket state representative filed a bill with the Massachusetts Legislature, Connecticut governor Ella T. Grasso suggested that the islands join her state. Additionally, the legislatures of New Hampshire, Rhode Island and Vermont each supported the islands' annexation to their state. Although the redistricting bill passed, the state representatives pledged to assign aides for the two counties that would report to their state representative, and the area received much positive publicity.

== Michigan ==
- Several times between 1858 and 1957, Michigan's Upper Peninsula and parts of Wisconsin have engaged in talks about forming a fifty-first state called "Superior."
- In 1979 a group called Citizens for Secession attempted to prompt leaders to move Cass County to Indiana and change the name to "Michiana County".

== Minnesota ==
- In the mid 19th century there had been intermittent advocacy for the Arrowhead of Minnesota, the four northeast counties of the state adjacent to Lake Superior, to join with northwestern Wisconsin and the Upper Peninsula of Michigan to form a new state to be named "North Country" or Superior, with Duluth as its capital.
- In March 2021, HF 2423 was introduced to the state legislature with the goal of establishing a process for counties to vote to leave the state of Minnesota and instead join one of Minnesota's bordering states. A petition was also started alongside the introduction of the proposal with the primary goal of counties outside the Twin Cities area joining South Dakota, but also encouraging joining Iowa or Wisconsin. The bill was introduced in response to Governor Tim Walz's response to the COVID-19 pandemic, in which Minnesota was shut down and restricted to a far stricter extent and for a longer duration of time than all its neighboring states. South Dakota, which remains the only state in the country to never issue any business restrictions at any time, was viewed in a major contrast to Minnesota's restrictions. Shortly after the bill's introduction, South Dakota Governor Kristi Noem tweeted in favor of the bill.

== Mississippi ==
During the American Civil War of 1861–65, in Jones County, Mississippi, Newton Knight, a deserter from the Confederate army, organized a militia of fellow deserters and escaped slaves and declared Jones County to be the Free State of Jones. They successfully prevented Confederate authorities from enforcing conscription, taxation, and slavery within the county, and hoped for admission to the United States as a new state.

== Missouri ==
- During the buildup to the Civil War, Callaway County declared itself the "Kingdom of Callaway", and attempted to secede from the state should it join the Union.
- McDonald County declared itself the McDonald Territory for a brief period of time in July 1961. The movement was half in jest, after a city within the county was accidentally omitted from an official Missouri map.

== Montana ==
- In 1939, a secessionist movement proposed the State of Absaroka, to be formed from portions of Montana, adjacent areas of Wyoming, and parts of South Dakota. Motivated by opposition to New Deal politics and a desire to bring tourism to the area, the craze was reflected in state automobile license plates bearing the name; a "Miss Absaroka" contest held in that year; and a minor league baseball team called the Absaroka Eagles.

== Nebraska ==
- In the 1890s, residents of the Nebraska Panhandle threatened to secede and join Wyoming when the state refused to enact water laws that would encourage irrigation.

== Nevada ==
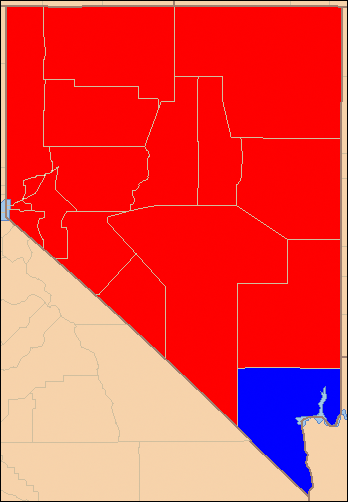
denotes the State of New Nevada denotes the remaining State of Nevada

- In 2020, residents of rural Nevada proposed breaking away from the state due to the strong liberal influence of Clark County on the politics of the state. The movement proposes the state of "New Nevada". Proponents of "New Nevada", alongside those of "New California", filed an amicus brief in the Supreme Court case Texas v. Pennsylvania.

== New Hampshire ==
- In 2001, the communities of Newington and Rye considered secession in response to the enactment of a uniform statewide property tax.

== New Jersey ==
- From 1674 to 1702 the colonial Province of New Jersey was divided into East Jersey, largely consisting of today's North Jersey, and West Jersey, largely consisting of South Jersey. The two regions maintain cultural differences with North Jersey largely being dominated by New York City, and South Jersey by Philadelphia. In 1980 a local journalist in Mount Holly, Albert Freeman, wrote an editorial calling for secession. Initially a joke, this movement gained momentum leading to the Egg Harbor council voting to secede and form the state of South Jersey. The issue eventually caught the attention of local lawmakers, upset with the construction of the Meadowlands Sports Complex in North Jersey, while the reconstruction of the Garden State Park Racetrack in South Jersey was blocked. A non-binding referendum was held in six southern counties, with the exclusion of Camden and Gloucester counties, which passed with 51% of voters in favor of secession. The only county to vote against secession was Ocean County.

== New York ==
Proposed map of an independent Long Island and New York City

- In the New York City mayoral election of 1969, writer Norman Mailer ran in the Democratic Party primary on a ticket with columnist Jimmy Breslin, who ran for City Council President. Part of their joint platform was a proposal that New York City should secede from New York State and become the 51st state. At around the same time, a public-affairs series on the local educational TV station, WNET-TV, channel 13, was called The Fifty-First State.
- In the 1990s, Randy Kuhl, from rural upstate Hammondsport, had advocated secession by regularly proposing bills to that effect while he was a state senator. His 1999 bill would have New York City, Long Island, Westchester and Rockland Counties become a separate state of New York, while the rest of the counties would be grouped as West New York.
- From 2007 to 2009, Long Island residents discussed secession on the grounds that their tax money is not used to fund programs in their counties. Proposals were made for the entire island (Kings, Queens, Nassau, and Suffolk counties) and for just the two suburban counties (Nassau and Suffolk).
- State senators Joseph Robach, Dale Volker, and Michael Ranzenhofer, all Republicans from western New York, proposed a nonbinding referendum to gauge support for dividing the state in November 2009. The referendum was again proposed by Stephen Hawley in 2013 and 2015, with members of the Long Island delegation to the state legislature also backing the 2015 bill.
- 2010 gubernatorial candidate Carl Paladino's supporters, Rus Thompson and James Ostrowski in the Buffalo region, have supported secession of western New York from New York City and its nearby counties. Fred Smerlas, in discussing a potential platform for a 2010 Congressional run from western New York, stated that he would make the separation of New York City and upstate a top priority: "My first act if I ever got elected would be to take a big saw and cut New York City off."
- Fifteen towns in the Southern Tier of New York proposed potential secession in 2015 to join Pennsylvania.

== North Carolina ==
- In 1784, the western counties of Greene, Washington, Sullivan, and parts of Hawkins County, formed the provisional State of Franklin, with Revolutionary War hero John Sevier as governor. However, since the state was not recognized by the Congress of the Confederation, it disbanded and joined North Carolina. In 1790, North Carolina relinquished the region to the federal government, creating the Southwest Territory. In 1796, the territory would be admitted to the Union as the State of Tennessee, with Sevier as its first governor.

== Oregon ==
- In 1941, counties in southwestern Oregon joined counties of Northern California to secede as the State of Jefferson. The movement was centered in rural communities who felt ignored by political leaders in more urban areas.
- In 2020, "Move Oregon's Border For a Greater Idaho" proposed breaking off most of Oregon's area and some of Northern California and join it with Idaho. The areas proposed to break off of Oregon and California vote Republican but in a state whose legislatures are dominated by Democrats. Douglas and Josephine counties in Oregon approved language for petitions to put a measure on the ballot. Even if passed by voters, it would still need approval from all three state legislatures.
- In 2021, five counties in eastern Oregon voted to "require county officials to take steps to promote" adding the counties to Idaho. In 2022, two more counties voted in favor of being added to Idaho. As of 2026, 12 counties have approved ballot measures in favor of Greater Idaho.

== Pennsylvania ==
- Westsylvania was proposed as the 14th state during the American Revolutionary War. It would have been located primarily in what is now West Virginia, southwestern Pennsylvania, and small parts of Kentucky, Maryland, and Virginia.
- More recent commentators have occasionally proposed separating the Philadelphia region from the rest of Pennsylvania, either as a state unto itself or as part of New Jersey.

== Rhode Island ==
- In 1984, the town of New Shoreham, coterminous with Block Island, threatened to secede because the state had denied them the ability to ban or to control the use of mopeds on the island. Both Massachusetts and Connecticut were reported as having interest in annexing the island. After the town voted to put the issue on the state ballot for June, the Rhode Island government eventually compromised by allowing the island to control the number of mopeds on the island.

== South Dakota ==
- Parts of South Dakota were proposed as part of Absaroka, a territory inspired by opposition to New Deal politics and a desire for increased tourism.

== Tennessee ==
- In 1861, after Tennessee joined the Confederacy, Scott County passed a proclamation to secede from Tennessee and form the "Free and Independent State of Scott" in order to support the Union. When it was discovered in 1986 that this county law was still on the books, the proclamation was finally repealed. The county then petitioned the state of Tennessee for readmission, even though the original secession had not been recognized by either the state or federal government.

== Texas ==
- Under the joint resolution of Congress, the Republic of Texas joined the Union with the right to partition itself into as many as five states. As a result, Texas "divisionists" would occasionally propose partitioning in its early decades.

== Utah ==
- State of Deseret, partly settled by Mormons before it was purchased from Mexico by the United States, had proposed boundaries far larger than the eventual Utah Territory.
- In 2002, the United States House of Representatives voted to allow Wendover to leave the state and join Nevada, merging with the city of West Wendover. However, Nevada Senator Harry Reid blocked the bill's consideration in the Senate, citing that it would affect the investments of the casinos in the border town.
- In 2008, state representative Neal Hendrickson proposed Joint Resolution 6 (HJR006): "the creation of a separate state, consisting of the southern portion of the present state of Utah with a northern boundary stretching east and west across the present state of Utah at the southern border of Utah County". Hendrickson's bill cited differences between the urban and heavily populated northern part of the state, with the less populous and mostly rural south. The bill did not pass.

== Vermont ==
- In 2004 and 2005, the town of Killington voted to secede from Vermont to join New Hampshire, despite being situated in the center of the state; the symbolic votes, taken at the yearly town meeting, were a protest against a rise in property taxes in Vermont. A similar motion was attempted in Winhall, but was voted down.

== Virginia ==
- Westsylvania, proposed as the 14th state during the American Revolutionary War, included areas that were then part of Virginia but mostly later became West Virginia and Kentucky. It would have been located primarily in what is now West Virginia, southwestern Pennsylvania, and small parts of Kentucky, Maryland, and Virginia.
- The District of Kentucky: Fayette, Jefferson, and Lincoln (all formerly part of Kentucky County) sought on numerous occasions to split from Virginia, beginning in the 1780s. Ten constitutional conventions were held in the Constitution Square Courthouse in Danville between 1784 and 1792. In 1790, Kentucky's delegates accepted Virginia's terms of separation, and a state constitution was drafted at the final convention in April 1792. The Virginia General Assembly adopted legislation on December 18, 1789, separating its "District of Kentucky" from the rest of the State and approving its statehood. Kentucky became the 15th state in the Union on June 1, 1792.
- West Virginia: Tensions within Virginia had been building; the western counties felt ignored and uncared for by the Richmond government. This broke into open rebellion after Virginia voted to secede from the Union. Several Trans–Allegheny region counties voted to secede from the state after Virginia joined the Confederate States of America at the beginning of the Civil War on April 17, 1861. Unionist leaders in Wheeling set up a new State government for Virginia under the Wheeling Convention that was recognized by the U.S. Government in Washington. On May 13, 1862, the General Assembly of the Restored Government of Virginia passed an act granting permission for creation of West Virginia, and the secessionist area wrote a constitution. It was admitted to the Union as West Virginia on June 20, 1863, the 35th state. Support for the Confederacy and the Union was about evenly divided in the new State and a guerrilla war lasted until 1865. Later, by its ruling in Virginia v. West Virginia (1871), the Supreme Court implicitly affirmed that the breakaway Virginia counties did have the proper consents necessary to become a separate state.
- Northern Virginia: Given the difference between Northern Virginia (NoVa) and the rest of Virginia (RoVa), some have proposed separating the two parts of the Commonwealth.

== Washington ==
- Present-day Washington is geographically divided into Eastern and Western regions by the Cascade Range. In the original proposal to establish Washington Territory, it was bounded on the east by the Columbia River. Since 1861, some eastern residents have proposed forming a new state, sometimes in combination with the Idaho Panhandle and relatively small parts of Montana and Oregon (consisting of the greater market area of Spokane). Names proposed include East Washington, Lincoln, and Cascadia (a name sometimes applied to the Pacific Northwest region as a whole). Reasons given are the distinct needs of urban and rural populations and political differences over water rights, labor law, and taxation.
  - In 1937, state senator James A. Murphy from King County introduced a resolution to partition the state along the Cascades as a joke, saying "west side pays the taxes and east side gets the money to build roads." He proposed calling the east side "Roosevelt." Several further joke resolutions were proposed in response, such as making King County its own state.
- In 2015, a bill was introduced in the Washington House of Representatives to create a task force for studying the impacts of adjusting the boundary lines of Washington to create two new states with one state east and one state west of the Cascade mountain range. In the same legislative session, a similar bill was introduced that would have included parts of Oregon in the newly created states. In 2017, legislators introduced a petition to the federal government regarding the creation of the state of Liberty, which would have a western boundary following the crest of the Cascade mountains and the western borders of Okanogan, Chelan, Kittitas, Yakima, and Klickitat counties, and whose eastern, northern, and southern boundaries would be the existing state borders. A bill and a federal petition to establish the state of Liberty were again introduced in 2019. None of these bills or petitions have been passed by the Washington House.

== Wisconsin ==
- On July 21, 1967, some residents of the village of Winneconne, Wisconsin said they were seceding, in protest over the village's omission from the state's official highway map, to become what they called the "Sovereign State of Winneconne". After the village was restored to the highway map, the secessionists in the village of Winneconne reconciled with the state. The village has since celebrated the event with an annual Sovereign State Days celebration.
- Portions of the northern counties were included in proposals for the State of Superior.

== Wyoming ==
- Parts of northern Wyoming were considered in a proposal for the State of Absaroka.

== See also ==
- 51st state
- List of active separatist movements in North America
- List of U.S. county secession proposals
- Territorial evolution of the United States, noting all state boundary changes
- Secession in the United States
