= Northern Illinois =

Region in the U.S. state of Illinois

Coordinates: 41°45′N 89°15′W

- Region of Illinois
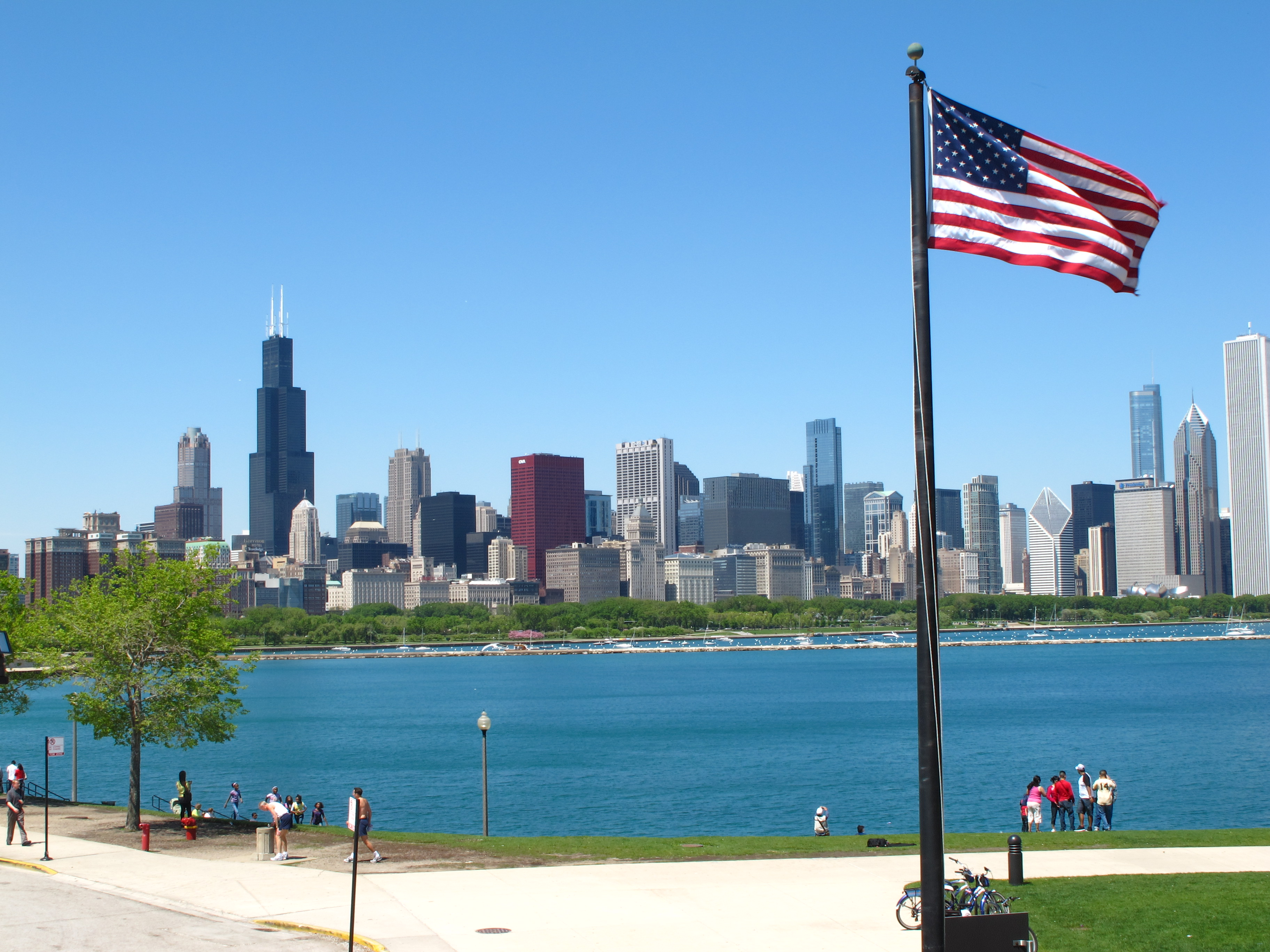
- Chicago, Illinois

- The Northern Illinois region
- Country: United States
- State: Illinois
- Largest city: Chicago

Population
  - Total: 9.7 million

Northern Illinois is a region covering the northern third of the U.S. state of Illinois. The region is by far the most populous of Illinois, with nearly 9.7 million residents as of 2010.

== Economics ==
Northern Illinois is dominated by the metropolitan areas of Chicago, the Quad Cities, and Rockford, which contain a majority (over 75%) of Illinois' population and economic activity, including numerous Fortune 500 companies and a heavy manufacturing, commercial, retail, service, and office based economy. Much of the economic activity of the region is centered in the Chicago Loop, the Illinois Technology and Research Corridor, and the Golden Corridor. However, rural sections of this region are highly productive agriculturally and are part of the Corn Belt. The John Deere headquarters is located in Moline. Additional smaller cities in the region include Kankakee, LaSalle-Peru, Ottawa, Freeport, Dixon, and Sterling-Rock Falls, which have predominantly manufacturing and agricultural economies. Northern Illinois is also one of the world's busiest freight railroad and truck traffic corridors, with rail corridors for UP, BNSF, CN, and CPRS running east-west, Interstates 80, 88, and 90 running east-west and Interstates 39 and 94 running north-south.

== Interstate 80 southern boundary ==
Interstate 80 is sometimes referenced as the informal southern boundary of Northern Illinois, and is often used in weather reports as a reference point, as in "south of Interstate 80 will see sleet and rain, but north of Interstate 80 can expect mostly snow."

== Education ==
Northern Illinois University (NIU), in DeKalb, is located at the heart of Northern Illinois and is the state's second largest institute of higher education. According to the Regional History Center at NIU, their area of service to the northern portion of Illinois includes the 18 northernmost counties, excluding Cook, Grundy, Kankakee, Mercer and Rock Island counties, which are covered by Eastern Illinois University and Western Illinois University, respectively, and University of Illinois at Chicago.

Several major colleges can be found in the Chicago area including Illinois' third largest state school, the University of Illinois at Chicago, as well as the University of Chicago and Northwestern University. Other notable schools include the Illinois Institute of Technology, Loyola University, DePaul University, Columbia College, Northeastern Illinois University, and Roosevelt University.

Several liberal arts schools such as Aurora University, Lewis University, North Central College, Elmhurst University, Wheaton College, Concordia University, and North Park University dot the Metropolitan Chicago landscape. Other institutions of higher education are found in Rockford, including Rockford University, Rock Valley College, Northern Illinois University-Rockford, University of Illinois College of Medicine-Rockford, a branch of Rasmussen College, and a branch of Judson University. Other colleges near the Quad Cities include Western Illinois University-Quad Cities and Augustana College.

These schools, along with several others, making Northern Illinois an area of important research. Such significant developments in science, including the creation of the atomic bomb and the Fujita Scale were rooted in Northern Illinois institutions.

== Politics ==
Politically, the region is quite diverse, with Cook County and Rock Island County being long-time strongholds for Democrats and north-central Illinois counties (Boone, Ogle, Lee, etc.) being reliable for Republicans. Suburban Chicago counties such as DuPage, Kane, Kendall, and McHenry counties were also very reliably Republican until recently. Some counties, such as Lake, Winnebago, and DeKalb, were once Republican strongholds, but are now more evenly divided. Politicians native to the area include Ulysses S. Grant, Ronald Reagan, Barack Obama, J. Dennis Hastert, Donald Rumsfeld, Hillary Clinton, and mayors Richard J. Daley and Richard M. Daley.

== Culture ==
Culturally, the area is tied heavily to Chicago. Most residents of Northern Illinois tend to support Chicago teams and lean towards the Chicago media market. The major college football program in Northern Illinois is the NIU Huskies. Northern Illinois also has large fanbases for the Illinois Fighting Illini, Notre Dame Fighting Irish, Iowa Hawkeyes, and the Northwestern Wildcats, as well as Chicago's professional sports teams such as the White Sox, Cubs, Bears, Blackhawks, and the Bulls. In Central and Southern Illinois, residents are tied primarily to St. Louis.

Regional dialects in Northern Illinois vary from those in other parts of Illinois. Surprisingly, different areas in Northern Illinois have their own independent cultures. Typically, areas west of Interstate 39 have more ties to Iowa and the Quad Cities area, as that is roughly the location of the westernmost terminus of the Chicago media area. Even dialects within Northern Illinois are different, emphasizing the above. Depending on location and ethnicity, a resident of the Chicago Metropolitan Area may have the stereotypical Chicago dialect, whereas those in more affluent areas, such as Lake County, may have a less easily pinpointed manner of speaking. Those west of McHenry and Kane counties have more stereotypical Midwestern dialects, and might not be able to be distinguished from people in Iowa or Nebraska.

Depending on how close to a specific metropolitan area a county is, their culture and media reflect that of the metro area. Areas such as the Ottawa, IL Micropolitan Statistical Area have a comfortable mix of culture from the Chicago area, Quad Cities area, and Peoria, perhaps due to its location in the center of the region.

== Subregions ==
Northern Illinois is divisible into subregions.

=== Chicago metropolitan area ===
The Chicago metropolitan area, or Chicagoland, is the metropolitan area associated with the city of Chicago, Illinois, and its suburbs. It is the area that is closely linked to the city through geographic, social, economic, and cultural ties.

==== Chicago ====
Chicago (/ʃɪˈkɑːɡoʊ/ or /ʃɪˈkɔːɡoʊ/) is the third most populous city in the United States, after New York City and Los Angeles. With 2.7 million residents, it is the most populous city in both the U.S. state of Illinois and the American Midwest. Its metropolitan area, sometimes called Chicagoland, is home to 9.5 million people and is the third-largest in the United States. Chicago is the seat of Cook County, although a small part of the city extends into DuPage County.

==== Collar counties ====
The collar counties are the five counties of Illinois that border on Chicago's Cook County. The collar counties (DuPage, Kane, Lake, McHenry, and Will) are tied to Chicago economically, but, like many suburban areas in the United States, have very different political leanings than does the core city. Chicago has long been a Democratic stronghold, and the collar counties are known for being historically Republican strongholds.

While the demographics of these suburban Chicago counties are fairly typical for American metropolitan areas, the term is apparently unique to this area. Because Chicago is so firmly entrenched in the Democratic column, and rural Downstate Illinois is so overwhelmingly Republican, the collar counties are routinely cited as being the key to any statewide election. However, that conventional wisdom was challenged by the fact that in 2010 Democrat Pat Quinn became governor while winning only Cook, St. Clair, Jackson and Alexander counties. All five collar counties went Republican, so the key to winning that gubernatorial election was simply winning Cook County, but by a wide enough margin to overwhelm the rest of the state.

While the term is perhaps most often employed in political discussions, that is not its exclusive use. Barack Obama used the term in his speech before the Democratic National Convention in 2004.

==== Fox Valley ====
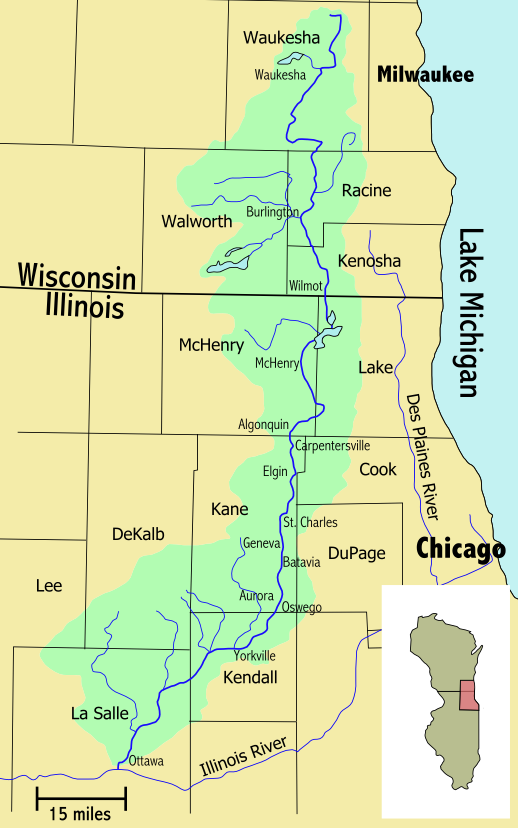
Fox Valley

The Fox Valley, also commonly known as the Fox River Valley, is a suburban and exurban region within Illinois along the western edge of the Chicago suburbs. This region centers on the Fox River of Illinois and Wisconsin. Around 1 million people live in this area. Native American tribes that lived near the Fox River included the Potawatomi, Sac, and Fox tribes. Some of the cities in the Fox River Valley are part of the Rust Belt. Within this region is Aurora, the second largest city in the state, Elgin, and the nearby cities of Batavia, St. Charles, and Geneva, which have been known as "the Tri-City area" since the early 20th century.

=== Northwestern Illinois ===
Northwestern Illinois is generally considered to consist of the following area: Jo Daviess County, Carroll County, Whiteside County, Stephenson County, Winnebago County, Ogle County, and Lee County. Northwestern Illinois borders the states of Iowa to the west and Wisconsin to the north.

==== Rockford, Illinois, metropolitan area ====
The Rockford Metropolitan Statistical Area, as defined by the United States Census Bureau, is an area consisting of four counties in north-central Illinois, anchored by the city of Rockford. As of the 2010 census, the MSA had a population of 349,431.

=== Quad Cities ===
The Quad Cities is a group of five cities straddling the Mississippi River on the Iowa–Illinois boundary, in the United States. These cities, Davenport and Bettendorf (in Iowa) and Rock Island, Moline, and East Moline (in Illinois), are the center of the Quad Cities Metropolitan Area, which, as of 2012, had a population estimate of 382,630 and a CSA population of 474,226, making it the 90th largest CSA in the nation. The Quad Cities is midway between Minneapolis and St. Louis, north and south, and Chicago and Des Moines, east and west. The area is the largest 300-mile market west of Chicago.

== Counties ==
- Boone
- Bureau
- Carroll
- Cook
- DeKalb
- DuPage
- Grundy
- Henry
- Jo Daviess
- Kane
- Kankakee
- Kendall
- Lake
- LaSalle
- Lee
- McHenry
- Mercer
- Ogle
- Putnam
- Rock Island
- Stephenson
- Whiteside
- Will
- Winnebago
