= Superior (proposed U.S. state) =

Proposed state of the United States

Coordinates: 46°N 87°W

- Proposed U.S. state
- State of Superior; State of Ontonagon
- Map of proposed state of Superior, indicating areas consistently included (darker), and those included less commonly (lighter).

Area
  - Total: 93,600 km^{2} (36,100 sq mi)
  - Rank: 40th (hypothetical)

Population (2020)
  - Total: 301,609
  - Rank: 51st (hypothetical)

The State of Superior (or State of Ontonagon) is a proposed "51st state" that would be created by the secession of the Upper Peninsula from the rest of Michigan, named for adjacent Lake Superior. Some proposals would also incorporate territory from the northern Lower Peninsula, northern Wisconsin, and even Minnesota. The proposals are spurred by cultural differences, geographic separation from Lower Michigan, and a belief that the problems of the "Superior Region" are ignored by distant state governments. When the Northwest Territory was being organized by the fledgling U.S. government, Thomas Jefferson proposed a state which he named Sylvania, including the Upper Peninsula and territory that is now northern Wisconsin and northeastern Minnesota. The idea has gained serious attention at times, but faces substantial practical obstacles.

== History ==
The state of Michigan was admitted to the Union in 1837, incorporating both the Upper and Lower Peninsulas. Efforts for the U.P. to secede and form a new state date to 1858, when a convention was held in Ontonagon, Michigan, for the purpose of combining the Upper Peninsula, northern Wisconsin, and northeast Minnesota into a new state to be called either Superior or Ontonagon. At the time, The New York Times editorialized:

Unless Congress should interpose objections, which cannot reasonably be apprehended, we see no cause why the new "State of Ontonagon" should not speedily take her place as an independent member of the union.

In 1897, another proposal for creating a state of Superior included areas in the Upper Peninsula along with portions of Wisconsin.

In 1959, following the statehood of Alaska and Hawaii, Ironwood, Michigan resident Ted Albert sued for "divorce" between the two peninsulas.

In 1962, an Upper Peninsula Independence Association was founded to advocate for the formation of a state of Superior. A secession bill was submitted to the Michigan Legislature, and 20,000 petition signatures were collected—36,000 short of the number needed—for a ballot referendum on separation.

Efforts continued into the mid-1970s (one bumper sticker suggested naming the 51st state "North Michigan"), when residents of the Upper Peninsula and northern Wisconsin, each resentful of perceived tax drains and other slights from their downstate cousins, and fears that environmental regulations would harm their economies, worked together to pursue the desired legislation. Several prominent legislators, including Upper Peninsula politician Dominic Jacobetti, attempted enacting such legislation in 1975, with no success.

Some support for statehood still exists in the region, although no organized movement was active as of 2012.

== Issues ==
The Upper Peninsula is separated from the Lower Peninsula by the Straits of Mackinac, and was not included in initial proposals to form the state of Michigan, but rather added by the federal government in the settlement of the Toledo War with Ohio. The Lower Peninsula developed an economy based on agriculture and manufacturing, while the Upper Peninsula's became based on forestry and mining. Travel between the two peninsulas remained difficult (especially in winter), and the people of the Upper Peninsula developed a distinct cultural identity as "Yoopers" (derived from "U.P.-ers"). Later, as the mining industry declined, Yoopers came to feel that their concerns were ignored by the state government, which was dominated by the populous cities of southern Lower Michigan.

The construction of the Mackinac Bridge in 1957 created a direct highway connection to the rest of the state, and tourism by Lower Michigan residents has grown substantially, creating greater economic and social connection. Secession from Michigan would require approval from the state legislature, and there is little support for it in the Lower Peninsula. There are also questions about Superior's viability as a separate state. The region receives a large amount of funding from the Michigan government based on tax revenue from the Lower Peninsula. If it were just the Upper Peninsula, it would have a smaller population than any other state, with its 301,609 residents representing only just over 50 percent of Wyoming's population. It would rank 40th in land area, slightly larger than Maryland. Its most populous city, Marquette, has a population of about 21,000; currently, the smallest city that is the largest of its state is Burlington, Vermont, with 44,000 people.

== See also ==
- List of state partition proposals in the United States
- Secession in the United States
