= Absaroka (proposed state) =

Proposed state in the United States

Coordinates: 44°N 107°W

- Proposed Flag of Absaroka (obverse)

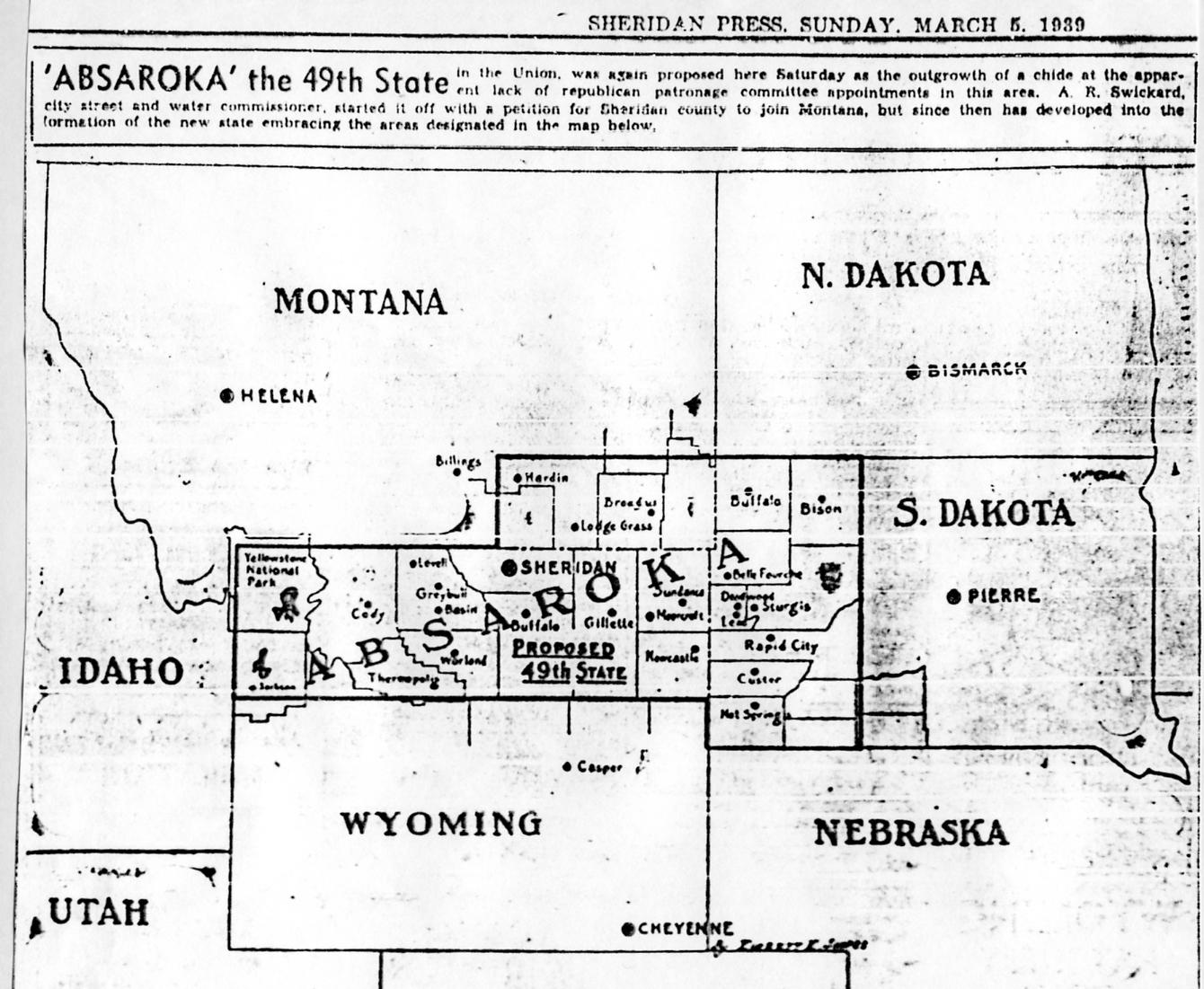
- Proposed, contemporary map from 1939.
- Status: Not admitted
- Capital: Sheridan (from Wyoming) (proposed)
- Common languages: English
- Time zone: Mountain
- Today part of: Wyoming, South Dakota, Montana

Absaroka was a proposed state in the United States that would have comprised parts of the states of Montana, South Dakota, and Wyoming, which contemplated secession in 1939. The movement began in 1935, during the Great Depression, as a form of protest against their respective state governments, who were criticized for failing to provide New Deal federal aid to rural ranchers and farmers.

A. R. Swickard, a local street commissioner, served as a leader of the movement and later declared himself governor. Swickard hosted a series of public hearings regarding grievances levied against the Montana, South Dakota, and Wyoming state governments, receiving substantial media coverage and prompting the respective governments to act. This led to broader distribution of federal aid to rural regions, resulting in the secessionist movement dying out by the start of World War II. It has been debated whether the movement was a serious attempt to form a new state.

== Background ==
In 1933, the New Deal was signed into law during the Franklin D. Roosevelt presidency. This legislation was designed to alleviate the economic downturn resultant from the Great Depression. This legislation was generally considered favorable amongst the citizens of southern Wyoming, resulting in Joseph C. O'Mahoney and other Democrats winning elections in the State and Federal elections, ultimately resulting in Wyoming's legislature being controlled by the Democratic Party. Residents of rural Northern Wyoming, as well as Southern Montana and Western South Dakota, felt discontent with the lack of federal aid they were receiving, believing that the more urban parts of their respective states were being prioritized by the New Deal.

== History ==
=== Formation (1935–1938) ===
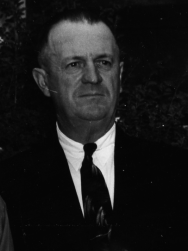
A. R. Swickard in 1939.

While the exact date of origin for the Absaroka movement is not known, individuals formally began organizing behind it in 1935. This began following a series of chamber of commerce hearings in which, primarily, ranchers and independent farmers in rural parts of northern Wyoming, southern Montana, and western South Dakota levied their complainants with the state and organized a secessionist movement. In these meetings, complainants from Wyoming would claim "All of the state money and attention goes to the southern part of the state", and they felt "short-changed" by their respective state governments. This sentiment was reflected further in local papers, including Queen City Mail in South Dakota, which stated in an editorial:

The difficulties of western South Dakota are well known. We are never given a square deal by the state legislature which is dominated by eastern South Dakotans. The last straw came when an ore tax was recently proposed which is aimed at Homestake Mining Company, the largest industry in western South Dakota.

Residents of Wyoming were particularly upset by the Democratic control of the state legislature, believing that their needs were being ignored, and the state was too focused on the construction of the Union Pacific Railroad. This discontent led to rural farmers, primarily Republican-leaning regions, calling for secession from Wyoming. The initial movement began as a petition for Sheridan County, Wyoming to secede and join Montana, and was filed by A. R. Swickard, the street commissioner of Sheridan, Wyoming. The movement quickly changed to petition the formation of a new state. The Absaroka movement also began directly following another secession movement that sought to have a portion of the Black Hills secede from South Dakota and join Wyoming. Indeed, historian Watson Parker has linked the Absaroka movement, in terms of economic and geographic identity, back to an 1870s attempt to form a Black Hills-based territory out of three adjacent existing territories.

The name "Absaroka" is derived from the Hidatsa name for the Crow people, meaning "children of the large-beaked bird" and shares a similar name to the nearby Absaroka Range.

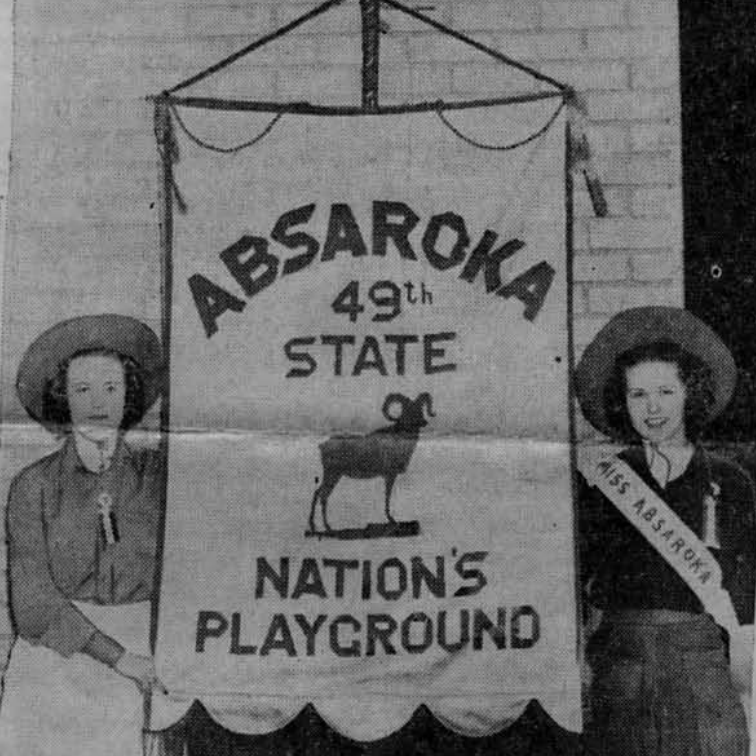
Ester Aspaas and Dorothy Fellows (Miss Absaroka) with the Absaroka State banner.

=== Height and dissolution (1939) ===
In 1939, supporters for the movement crowned Dorothy Fellows as Miss Absaroka, emulating the Miss America beauty pageant, wherein a winner is declared from each state as part of a larger national competition. Images of Miss Absaroka, alongside state automobile license plates and state coins for Absaroka, were issued soon after. A prominent supporter of the movement was C. M. Rowe, a professor at the South Dakota School of Mines. That same year, the King of Norway toured southeast Montana and Wyoming, and supporters of the secessionist movement claimed this event as official recognition of the new state. Swickard also met with the Governor of Wyoming, Nels H. Smith, on May 12, 1939, to discuss the formation of a new state. Swickard said after leaving the meeting:

It was just a friendly chat. I told the Governor of our sister state to the south of Buffalo that we had no warlike designs, and that rumors we might try to secede by force were erroneous. We Absarokans are a peace-loving lot and while we think that we really need the state of Absaroka we are not inclined to revolution.

Around this time, Samuel W. King, a congressional representative for the Hawaii territory, stated during a session of Congress, "Hawaii is entitled by prior claim to be the 49th state. Let Absaroka be the 50th but Hawaii has claim to the 49th!" Following the Miss Absaroka pageant, A. R. Swickard appointed himself "governor" and held a series of grievance hearings covering the perceived wrongs committed by the state of Wyoming.

A. R. Swickard also criticized the now Republican-led Wyoming state government, which took office following the 1938 Wyoming state elections, for not providing his movement with what the Associated Press called political patronage jobs. These hearings led to increased media attention on the secessionist movement and its criticisms of the state government, prompting Wyoming, South Dakota, and Montana to spread state revenues more broadly to rural communities. This effort, ultimately, rendered the secessionist movement largely defunct by the end of 1939. The secessionists' activities ceased entirely following the onset of World War II and were largely considered forgotten by the time of the Eisenhower presidency.

== Geography and attractions ==
Swickard, alongside his supporters, drew the initial borders for the state in the basement of the Sheridan Rotary Club, which became the de facto headquarters for the movement. The boundaries of the proposed state changed a number of times, and at one point contained 10 Wyoming counties, 4 Montana counties, and 12 South Dakota counties. This proposed state is estimated to have included approximately half of Wyoming's territory. The state's territory would have featured a coal-rich landscape with a large number of pre-established mines, including The Black Thunder, Coal Creek, and Cordero Rojo mines.

Increasing tourism to the region was another motivation for the proposed state because Mount Rushmore (constructed 1927–1941) would be within Absaroka according to some plans. Additionally, that region would have contained the Black Hills, Devils Tower, the Bighorn Mountains, the Teton Mountains, and Yellowstone National Park. This resulted in residents of the proposed state calling Absaroka the "Nation's Playground".

== Reception and legacy ==
The secessionist movement never achieved widespread popularity, nor pursued legal means of secession. In a 1941 publication by the Federal Writers' Project, the story of Absaroka was published as an example of Western eccentricity. The formation of Absaroka has been assessed as only "half serious" and some historians have argued that the attempt to secede was a tall tale. Another historian has stated that the movement fell "into oblivion after having provided a modicum of excitement and entertainment for its participants." Contemporary coverage of the event is likewise uncertain if the secession movement was meant to be serious or started as a joke, and the press compared it to the similar Texlahoma secession movement. It has also been proposed that the movement was a "fun way for cowboys to distract themselves during tough economic times". In an interview with Helen Graham, a librarian at the Sheridan Public Library and a resident of Sheridan during the 1930s, she claimed that the movement was not widely known, nor perceived to be serious. Regarding the Absaroka movement, U.S. Senator Alan Simpson stated in a 2008 interview that he had an uncle who participated in the movement. Senator Simpson went on to recount, "They're weren't fooling around; a lot of people thought it was silliness, but to them, it wasn't."

It has been proposed by Kirk Johnson, an expert on the American West, that the effort to secede was largely brought about by cultural and geographical differences. The region Absaroka would have occupied was settled later than most regions of the United States. Due to the American Indian Wars, the region was not safely settled till the late 1800s to early 1900s, resulting in "frontier spirit of experimentation still (being) fresh" during the 1930s.

The series Walt Longmire Mysteries, written by Craig Johnson, takes place in the fictional Absaroka county of Wyoming. This county was created as a reference to the Absaroka secession movement, with Johnson claiming the name choice was to "make this place emblematic of the rural West and maybe of rural areas all over the world." This same county was later featured in the A&E and Netflix television adaptation Longmire.

== Gallery ==
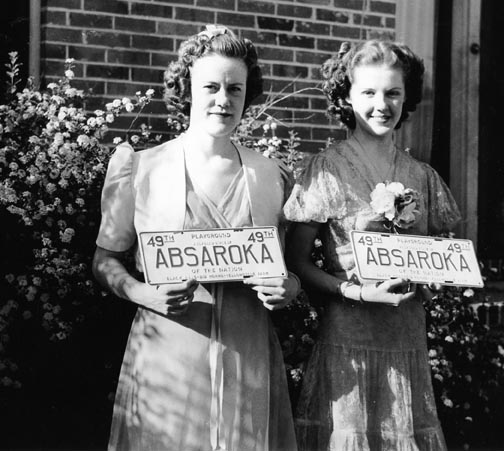
Miss Absaroka contestants holding the 1939 license plates.

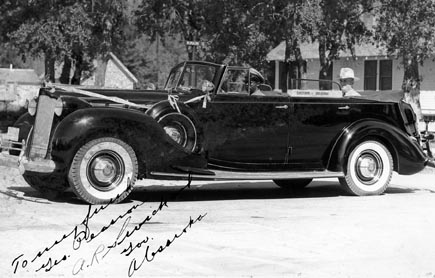
Postcard of the King of Norway with A. R. Swickard.

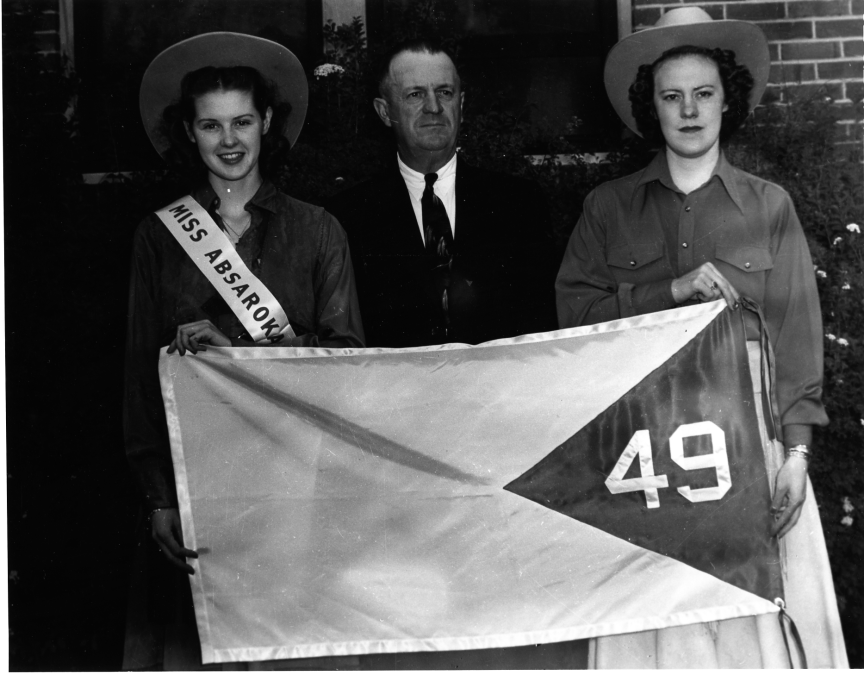
Dorothy Fellows, Miss Absaroka (left), A. R. Swickard (middle), and Esther Aspaas (right), holding the proposed Absaroka state flag.

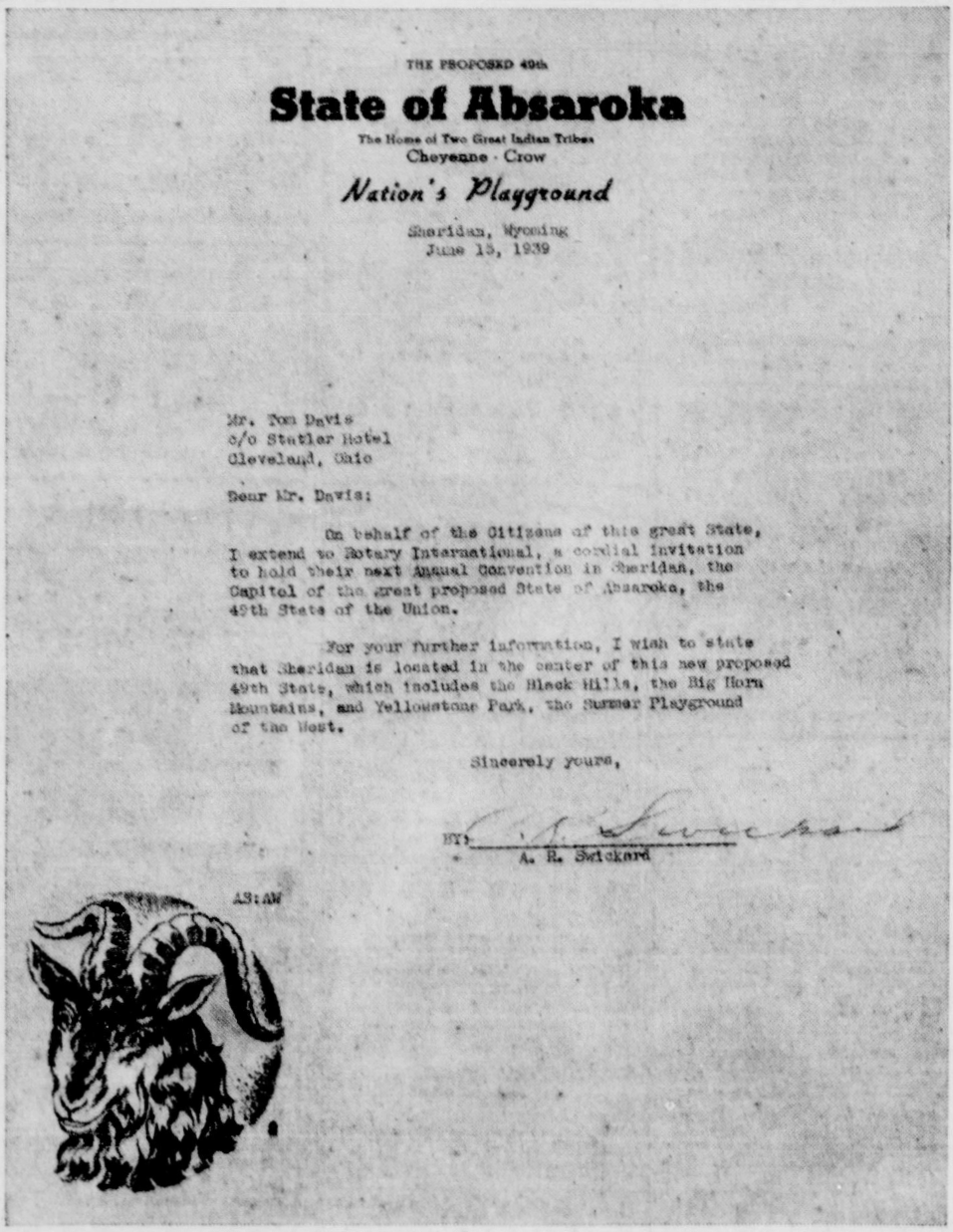
A. R. Swickard inviting Tom Davis of Rotary International to host their annual convention in Sheridan.

== See also ==
- List of U.S. state partition proposals
- Historical regions of the United States
