= 2024 Illinois elections =

- November 5, 2024

The Illinois general election was held on November 5, 2024. Primary elections, held using an open primary system, took place on March 19, 2024.

== State elections ==
=== State House of Representatives ===
Elections were held for all 118 seats in the Illinois House of Representatives.

=== State senate ===
Elections were held for 20 out of 59 seats in the Illinois Senate.

== Local elections ==
Local elections were also held, including county elections.

=== Cook County ===
In Cook County, elections were held for State's Attorney, Clerk of the Circuit Court, one seat on the Board of Review, 2 seats on the Water Reclamation District Board, and several judgeships in the Circuit Court of Cook County and its subcircuits.

==== Chicago ====
In Chicago, the first ever elections were held for the Board of Education, which began its transition from an appointed to an elected board.
