= West Kansas =

Proposed U.S. state

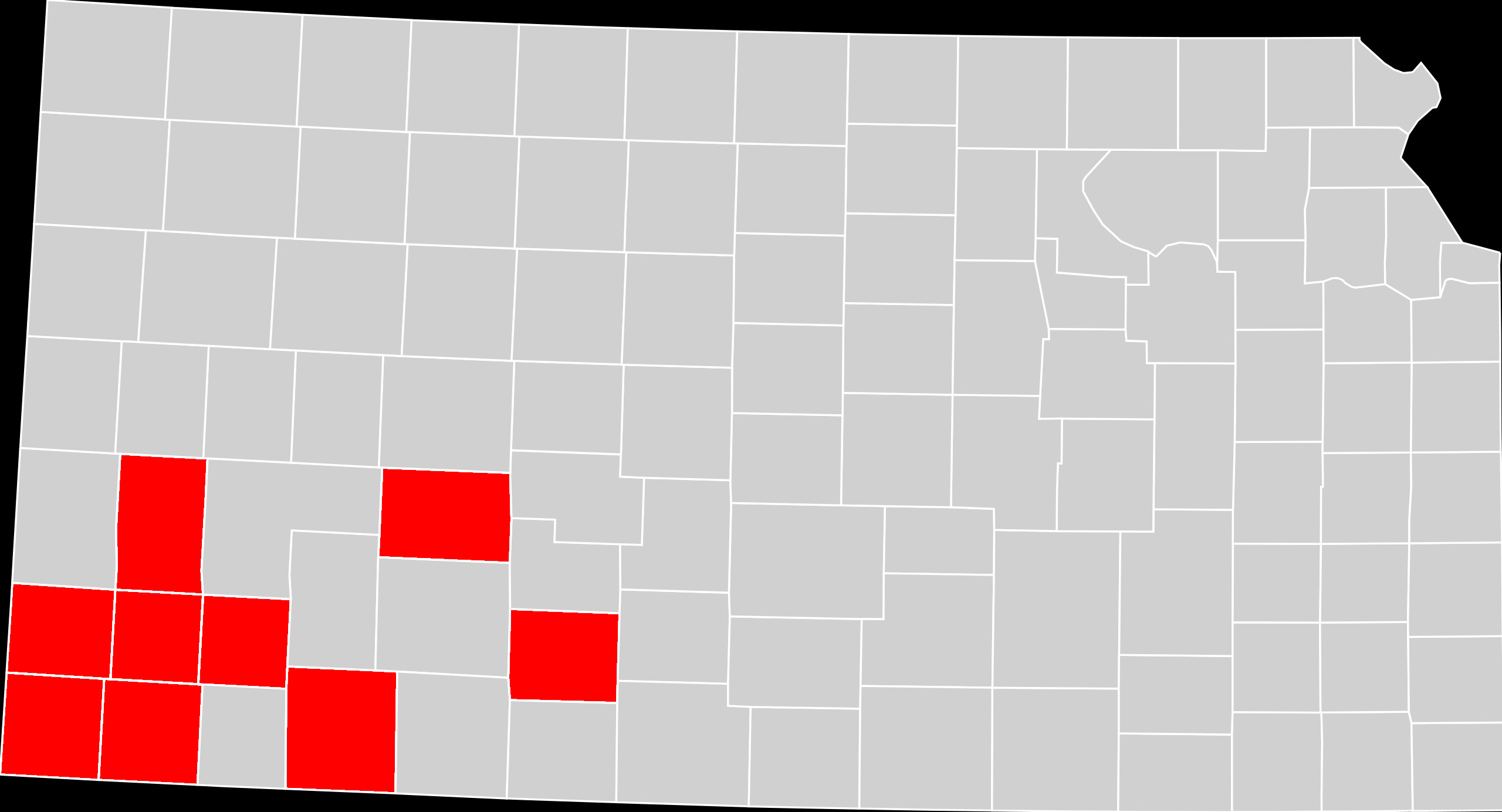
The counties that held straw polls in favor of forming West Kansas

West Kansas was a proposed state of the United States, advocated by a brief secessionist movement in the 1990s. The movement emerged in response to a 1992 school finance law, that rural communities argued unfairly disadvantaged their schools. The proposal sought to establish a new state comprising nine counties in southwestern Kansas.

== Background ==
In May 1992, Kansas governor Joan Finney signed into law a new school finance formula that significantly affected several southwestern Kansas counties. The law increased taxes and redirected state education funding from rural school districts to urban areas, sparking opposition in rural communities. In response, a secession movement led by Don O. Concannon emerged, advocating for the formation of a new state.

The group organized a series of straw polls, which revealed strong support for secession in nine southwestern Kansas counties: Grant, Haskell, Hodgeman, Kearny, Kiowa, Meade, Morton, Stanton, and Stevens.

On September 11, 1992, a constitutional convention was held in Ulysses, Kansas, where the group formally decided to name the proposed state "West Kansas". The convention also selected a state bird (the pheasant) and a state flower (the yucca).

Despite the enthusiasm, the West Kansas secession movement quickly lost momentum, and a formal petition for secession was never presented to the Kansas Legislature. Seventeen affected school districts filed lawsuits challenging the 1992 school finance law, but in 1994, the Kansas Supreme Court upheld its constitutionality.

University of Oklahoma professor Peter J. McCormick observed in 1995 that "the real differences between the southwest and the rest of Kansas remain, however, as do issues of school control and unfair taxation."

== See also ==
- List of state partition proposals in the United States
- Northern Colorado, another proposed state in which some Kansas counties were involved
