= Collar counties =

Counties in Illinois surrounding Chicago

- Region of Illinois
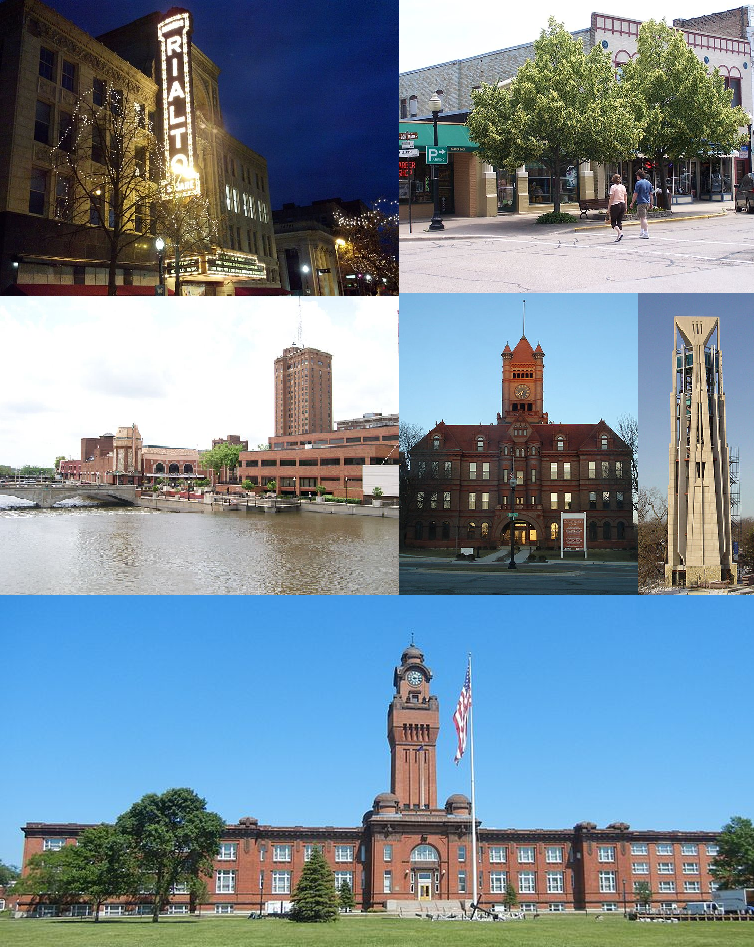
- Clockwise from top left: Rialto Square Theater (Joliet), Downtown Crystal Lake, Moser Tower (Naperville), Old DuPage County Courthouse (Wheaton), Great Lakes Naval Training Station (North Chicago), and Downtown Aurora

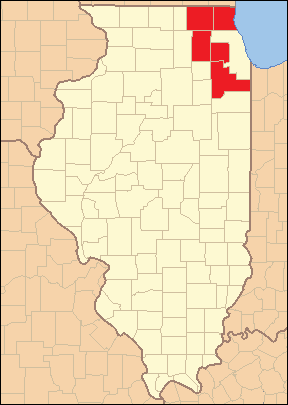
- Country: United States
- State: Illinois
- Counties: DuPage, Kane, Lake, McHenry, and Will
- Settled: 1770s
- Named for: Their mutual proximity to, and surrounding of, Cook County

Population (2012 Estimate)
  - Total: 3,143,257
- Time zone: UTC−06:00 (CST)
  - Summer (DST): UTC−05:00 (CDT)
- Area codes: 224, 331, 630, 779, 815, 847

Collar counties is a colloquialism for DuPage, Kane, Lake, McHenry, and Will counties, the five counties of Illinois that border Cook County, which is home to Chicago. The collar counties are part of the Chicago metropolitan area, and comprise many of the area's suburbs. While Lake County, Indiana also borders Cook County, it is not typically included in the phrase "Collar Counties" due to different socioeconomic characteristics and positionality.

After Cook County, the collar counties are also the next five most populous counties in Illinois. According to the Encyclopedia of Chicago, there is no specifically known origin of the phrase, but it has been commonly used among policy-makers, urban planners, and in the media.

In 1950, the Census Bureau defined the Chicago metropolitan statistical area as comprising Cook County, four of the five collar counties (excluding McHenry), and Lake County in Indiana. In 2010, reflecting urban growth, the Bureau redefined the area as comprising several additional counties in Illinois, Indiana, and Wisconsin.

As of 2019, there are 3,150,376 people residing in the collar counties, nearly 25% of the population of Illinois. Cook County and the collar counties combined are home to approximately 65% of Illinois's population.

== Politics ==
While it is not its exclusive use, the term is often employed in political discussions. Like many other suburban areas in the United States, the collar counties have somewhat different political leanings from the core city. Chicago has long been a Democratic stronghold, while the collar counties historically tilted Republican. In recent elections, however, the collar counties have voted for Democrats, but with lower margins than Cook County.

For most of the 20th century, the collar counties were solidly Republican, voting for the Republican nominee in nearly every presidential election and often by large margins. The counties continued to support the Republicans in the 1990s and 2000s but were closer than previously. During this period, the collar counties were routinely cited as being the key to any statewide election, as Cook County and downstate Illinois tend to vote for Democrats and Republicans, respectively, by large margins. However, that conventional wisdom was challenged in the 2010 gubernatorial election, as Democrat Pat Quinn won election while winning only Cook County and three counties in Southern Illinois. All five collar counties went Republican, thus the key to that election was turning out Cook County voters and winning it by a wide enough margin to overwhelm the rest of the state.

Barack Obama used the term in his speech before the 2004 Democratic National Convention.

The collar counties have become significantly more Democratic since the 2010s, resulting in Illinois as a whole becoming more reliably Democratic and no longer competitive for Republicans. As Democrats began organizing in the area to appeal to suburban voters while Republicans turned towards conservativism, along with demographic changes, much of the counties' politics shifted considerably. Obama won all five collar counties in 2008, and all of them but McHenry have gone on to vote for the Democratic nominee in every presidential election since. By the 2020 presidential election, all but one county backed Joe Biden, with Donald Trump carrying McHenry County by a narrow 2.5 percentage points. Similarly, the counties, with the exception of McHenry in most instances, now favor Democrats in statewide and legislative elections.

== See also ==
- Examples of other wealthy, historically conservative suburban regions in the United States:
  - Pennsylvania suburban counties of Philadelphia: Bucks County, Pennsylvania, Chester County, Pennsylvania, Delaware County, Pennsylvania, and Montgomery County, Pennsylvania (for Philadelphia).
    - Sometimes also referred to as "the collar counties"
  - Long Island (for New York City)
    - Morris County, New Jersey (for New York City and Newark)
  - Northern Virginia (for Washington, D.C.)
  - WOW counties (for Milwaukee)
