= Downstate Illinois =

Region of Illinois south of the Chicago area

Coordinates: 40°N 89°W

Cook County Rest of Chicago metropolitan area in 1950 Parts added to Chicago metropolitan area by 2010 (NOTE: This is only for the Illinois part of the metropolitan area.)

Downstate Illinois refers to the part of the U.S. state of Illinois south or outside of the Chicago metropolitan area, which is in the northeast corner of the state and has been dominant in state history, politics, and culture.

Downstate Illinois lacks a precise definition. Various boundaries that have been used are the Chicago city limits, the boundaries of Cook County, the collar counties, all of Illinois not contained in the Chicago media market, Interstate 80, and Bloomington. Prior to the 2000 United States census, when it became part of the Chicago metropolitan area, even DeKalb (located 65 miles west of Chicago) was often considered to be "downstate".

With regard to geographic placenames, the terms "up" and "down" generally refer to upstream and downstream with respect to a river basin, in this case that of the Mississippi River, which flows from north to south along the western edge of the state. Thus, the term "Downstate Illinois" may be understood to refer to the part of the state which lies downstream with respect to the Mississippi River and its tributaries in Illinois, such as the Illinois River.

Downstate Illinois is divided into three regions: Northern, Central, and Southern, which in turn are divided into more regions. The term has been used by Northern Illinois residents for decades and is commonly used by the media. The Illinois General Assembly regularly uses the term in the titles of bills it passes.

Although most of the state's population is concentrated in and around Chicago, several midsized cities such as Springfield, the state capital, are located "downstate".

Ten Largest Cities in Downstate Illinois
Rank	City	Population	County
1	Rockford	148,655	Winnebago
2	Springfield	114,394	Sangamon
3	Peoria	113,150	Peoria
4	Champaign	88,302	Champaign
5	Bloomington	78,680	McLean
6	Decatur	70,522	Macon
7	Normal	52,736	McLean
8	Moline	42,985	Rock Island
9	Belleville	42,404	St. Clair
10	Quincy	39,463	Adams

== See also ==
- Forgottonia
