= Northwestern Illinois =

Geographic region of the U.S. state of Illinois

Northwestern Illinois.

Northwestern Illinois is a geographic region of the state of Illinois within the USA.

Northwestern Illinois is generally considered to consist of the following area: Jo Daviess County, Carroll County, Whiteside County, Stephenson County, Winnebago County, Ogle County, and Lee County. Northwestern Illinois borders the states of Iowa to the west and Wisconsin to the north.

The largest city in this region, located near the eastern edge, is Rockford. Rockford's Metropolitan Area includes Winnebago County and Boone County (to the east), with an estimated 2009 population of 353,722.

Former US President Ronald Reagan was born in the Whiteside County town of Tampico, IL.

== Geography ==
The geography of northwestern Illinois varies from that of the rest of the state. The area is primarily in the Driftless Area, which is characterized by bluffs, valleys, and rolling hills. Two counties most characteristic of the Driftless Area are Jo Daviess County and Carroll.
