= List of amendments to the Constitution of the United States =

Thirty-three amendments to the Constitution of the United States (also referred to formally as articles of amendment) have been proposed by the United States Congress and sent to the states for ratification since the Constitution was put into operation on March 4, 1789. Twenty-seven of those, having been ratified by the requisite number of states, are now part of the Constitution.

The first ten amendments were adopted and sent to the states by Congress as a group, and later were also ratified together (and thus simultaneously); these are collectively known as the Bill of Rights. The 13th, 14th, and 15th amendments deal with slavery, equal protection and certain constitutional rights; collectively, these are known as the Reconstruction Amendments.

Six proposed amendments have been adopted by Congress and sent to the states, but have not been ratified by the required number of states and so do not form part of the Constitution. Four of these unratified amendments are still pending; one is closed having failed by its own terms; and one is closed and has failed by the terms of the resolution proposing it.

All 33 (27 ratified plus 6 unratified) amendments are listed and detailed in the tables below.

== Proposal and ratification process ==
Article Five of the United States Constitution details the two-step process for amending the nation's plan of government. Amendments must be properly proposed and ratified before becoming operative. This process was designed to strike a balance between the excesses of constant change and inflexibility.

An amendment may be proposed and sent to the states for ratification by either:

- The U.S. Congress, whenever a two-thirds majority in both the Senate and the House of Representatives deem it necessary; or
- A national convention, called by Congress for this purpose, on the application of the legislatures of two-thirds of the states (34 since 1959). This option has never been used.

To become part of the Constitution, an amendment must be ratified by three-fourths of the states (38 since 1959) by either (as determined by Congress):

- The legislatures of three-fourths of the states; or
- State ratifying conventions in three-fourths of the states. The only amendment to be ratified through this method thus far is the Twenty-first Amendment in 1933. That amendment is also the only one that explicitly repeals an earlier one, the Eighteenth Amendment (ratified in 1919), establishing the prohibition of alcohol.

Congress has also enacted statutes governing the constitutional amendment process. When a constitutional amendment is sent to the states for ratification, the Archivist of the United States is charged with responsibility for administering the ratification process under the provisions of 1 U.S.C. § 106b. Then, upon being properly ratified, the archivist issues a certificate proclaiming that an amendment has become an operative part of the Constitution.

Since the early 20th century, Congress has, on several occasions, stipulated that an amendment must be ratified by the required number of states within seven years from the date of its submission to the states in order to become part of the Constitution. Congress's authority to set a ratification deadline was affirmed in 1939 by the Supreme Court of the United States in Coleman v. Miller (307 U.S. 433). In the absence of a deadline, an amendment can be pending indefinitely, as are the four early amendments which are still technically 'pending'. Such measures could theoretically be returned to and eventually ratified long after (hundreds of years after) being proposed to the states.

Approximately 11,985 proposals to amend the Constitution have been introduced in Congress since 1789 (as of December 1, 2025). Collectively, members of the House and Senate typically propose around 200 amendments during each two-year term of Congress. Proposals have covered numerous topics, but none made in recent decades have been supported sufficiently in Congress to be put to the states and so none have become part of the Constitution. Historically, most died in the congressional committees to which they were assigned. Since 1999, only about 20 proposed amendments have received a vote by either the full House or full Senate. The last time a proposal gained the requisite two-thirds support in both the House and the Senate was the District of Columbia Voting Rights Amendment in 1978; it then failed at the ratification stage, as only 16 states had ratified it by the time the seven-year limit expired in 1985.

== Ratified amendments ==
=== Synopsis of each ratified amendment ===
No.	Subject	Ratification		
No.	Subject	Proposed	Completed	Time span
1st	Protects freedom of religion, freedom of speech, freedom of the press, freedom of assembly and the right to petition the government.	September 25, 1789	December 15, 1791	2 years, 81 days
2nd	Protects the right to keep and bear arms.	September 25, 1789	December 15, 1791	2 years, 81 days
3rd	Restricts the quartering of soldiers in private homes.	September 25, 1789	December 15, 1791	2 years, 81 days
4th	Prohibits unreasonable searches and seizures and sets requirements for search warrants based on probable cause.	September 25, 1789	December 15, 1791	2 years, 81 days
5th	Sets rules for indictment by grand jury and eminent domain, protects the right to due process and prohibits self-incrimination and double jeopardy.	September 25, 1789	December 15, 1791	2 years, 81 days
6th	Protects the right to a speedy public trial by jury, to notification of criminal accusations, to confront the accuser, to obtain witnesses and to retain counsel.	September 25, 1789	December 15, 1791	2 years, 81 days
7th	Provides for the right to a jury trial in civil lawsuits.	September 25, 1789	December 15, 1791	2 years, 81 days
8th	Prohibits excessive fines and excessive bail, as well as cruel and unusual punishment.	September 25, 1789	December 15, 1791	2 years, 81 days
9th	States that rights not enumerated in the Constitution are retained by the people.	September 25, 1789	December 15, 1791	2 years, 81 days
10th	States that the federal government possesses only those powers delegated, or enumerated, to it through the Constitution, and that all other powers are reserved to the states, or to the people.	September 25, 1789	December 15, 1791	2 years, 81 days
11th	Immunizes states from suits brought by out-of-state citizens and foreigners not living within the state borders; lays the foundation for state sovereign immunity.	March 4, 1794	February 7, 1795	340 days
12th	Establishes that the vice president is elected together with the president rather than as the runner-up in the presidential election.	December 9, 1803	June 15, 1804	189 days
13th	Abolishes slavery and involuntary servitude, except as punishment for a crime.	January 31, 1865	December 6, 1865	309 days
14th	Defines citizenship, contains the Privileges or Immunities Clause, the Due Process Clause and the Equal Protection Clause, and deals with post–Civil War issues.	June 13, 1866	July 9, 1868	2 years, 26 days
15th	Prohibits the denial of the right to vote based on race, color or previous condition of servitude.	February 26, 1869	February 3, 1870	342 days
16th	Permits Congress to levy an income tax without apportioning it among the various states or basing it on the United States Census.	July 12, 1909	February 3, 1913	3 years, 206 days
17th	Establishes the direct election of United States senators by popular vote.	May 13, 1912	April 8, 1913	330 days
18th	Prohibits the manufacturing or sale of alcohol within the United States. (Repealed on December 5, 1933, by the 21st Amendment.)	December 18, 1917	January 16, 1919	1 year, 29 days
19th	Prohibits the denial of the right to vote based on sex.	June 4, 1919	August 18, 1920	1 year, 75 days
20th	Changes the dates on which the terms of the president and vice president, and of members of Congress, begin and end, to January 20 and January 3 respectively. States that if the president-elect dies before taking office, the vice president–elect is to be inaugurated as president.	March 2, 1932	January 23, 1933	327 days
21st	Repeals the 18th Amendment and makes it a federal offense to transport or import intoxicating liquors into U.S. states and territories where prohibited by law.	February 20, 1933	December 5, 1933	288 days
22nd	Limits the number of times a person can be elected president.	March 21, 1947	February 27, 1951	3 years, 343 days
23rd	Grants the District of Columbia electors in the Electoral College.	June 16, 1960	March 29, 1961	286 days
24th	Prohibits the revocation of voting rights based upon failure to pay taxes.	September 14, 1962	January 23, 1964	1 year, 131 days
25th	Addresses succession to the presidency and establishes procedures both for filling a vacancy in the office of the vice president and responding to presidential disabilities.	July 6, 1965	February 10, 1967	1 year, 219 days
26th	Lowers the voting age to 18 years.	March 23, 1971	July 1, 1971	100 days
27th	Delays laws affecting Congressional salary from taking effect until after the next election of representatives.	September 25, 1789	May 7, 1992	202 years, 223 days

=== Summary of ratification data for each ratified amendment ===
Legend	Y	indicates that state ratified amendment																
Legend	N	indicates that state rejected amendment																
Legend	Y^{(‡)}	indicates that state ratified amendment after first rejecting it																
Legend	Y^{(×)}	indicates that state ratified amendment, later rescinded that ratification, but subsequently re-ratified it																
Legend	—	indicates that state did not complete action on amendment																
Legend	^{…}	indicates that amendment was ratified before state joined the Union																
State (in order of statehood)	Amendment																	
State (in order of statehood)	1–10	11	12	13	14	15	16	17	18	19	20	21	22	23	24	25	26	27
Delaware	Y	Y	N	Y^{(‡)}	Y^{(‡)}	Y^{(‡)}	Y	Y^{(‡)}	Y	Y^{(‡)}	Y	Y	Y	Y	Y	Y	Y	Y
Pennsylvania	Y	—	Y	Y	Y	Y	—	Y	Y	Y	Y	Y	Y	Y	Y	Y	Y	—
New Jersey	Y	Y	Y	Y^{(‡)}	Y^{(×)}	Y^{(‡)}	Y	Y	Y	Y	Y	Y	Y	Y	Y	Y	Y	Y
Georgia	Y	Y	Y	Y	Y^{(‡)}	Y	Y	—	Y	Y^{(‡)}	Y	—	Y	—	—	—	Y	Y
Connecticut	Y	Y	N	Y	Y	Y	N	Y	N	Y	Y	Y	Y	Y	Y	Y	Y	Y
Massachusetts	Y	Y	Y^{(‡)}	Y	Y	Y	Y	Y	Y	Y	Y	Y	N	Y	Y	Y	Y	—
Maryland	Y	Y	Y	Y	Y^{(‡)}	Y^{(‡)}	Y	Y	Y	Y^{(‡)}	Y	Y	Y	Y	Y	Y	Y	Y
South Carolina	Y	Y	Y	Y	Y^{(‡)}	Y	Y	—	Y	Y^{(‡)}	Y	N	Y	—	—	Y	Y	Y
New Hampshire	Y	Y	Y	Y	Y	Y	Y^{(‡)}	Y	Y	Y	Y	Y	Y	Y	Y	Y	Y	Y^{(‡)}
Virginia	Y	Y	Y	Y	Y^{(‡)}	Y	N	—	Y	Y^{(‡)}	Y	Y	Y	—	Y	Y	Y	Y
New York	Y	Y	Y	Y	Y	Y^{(×)}	Y	Y	Y	Y	Y	Y	Y	Y	Y	Y	Y	—
North Carolina	Y	Y	Y	Y	Y^{(‡)}	Y	Y	Y	Y	Y	Y	—	Y	—	Y	Y	Y	Y
Rhode Island	Y	Y	Y	Y	Y	Y	N	Y	N	Y	Y	Y	—	Y	Y	Y	Y	Y
Vermont	Y	Y	Y	Y	Y	Y	Y	Y	Y	Y	Y	Y	Y	Y	Y	Y	Y	Y
Kentucky	^{...}	Y	Y	Y^{(‡)}	Y^{(‡)}	Y^{(‡)}	Y	—	Y	Y	Y	Y	—	—	Y	Y	—	Y
Tennessee	^{...}	^{...}	Y	Y	Y	Y^{(‡)}	Y	Y	Y	Y	Y	Y	Y	Y	Y	Y	Y	Y
Ohio	^{...}	^{...}	Y	Y	Y^{(×)}	Y^{(‡)}	Y	Y	Y	Y	Y	Y	Y	Y	Y	Y	Y	Y
Louisiana	^{...}	^{...}	^{...}	Y	Y^{(‡)}	Y	Y	Y	Y	Y^{(‡)}	Y	—	Y	—	—	Y	Y	Y
Indiana	^{...}	^{...}	^{...}	Y	Y	Y	Y	Y	Y	Y	Y	Y	Y	Y	Y	Y	Y	Y
Mississippi	^{...}	^{...}	^{...}	Y^{(‡)}	Y	Y	Y	—	Y	Y^{(‡)}	Y	—	Y	—	N	Y	—	—
Illinois	^{...}	^{...}	^{...}	Y	Y	Y	Y	Y	Y	Y	Y	Y	Y	Y	Y	Y	Y	Y
Alabama	^{...}	^{...}	^{...}	Y	Y	Y	Y	Y	Y	Y^{(‡)}	Y	Y	Y	Y	Y	Y	Y	Y
Maine	^{...}	^{...}	^{...}	Y	Y	Y	Y	Y	Y	Y	Y	Y	Y	Y	Y	Y	Y	Y
Missouri	^{...}	^{...}	^{...}	Y	Y	Y	Y	Y	Y	Y	Y	Y	Y	Y	Y	Y	Y	Y
Arkansas	^{...}	^{...}	^{...}	Y	Y	Y	Y^{(‡)}	Y	Y	Y	Y	Y	Y	N	—	Y	Y	Y
Michigan	^{...}	^{...}	^{...}	Y	Y	Y	Y	Y	Y	Y	Y	Y	Y	Y	Y	Y	Y	Y
Florida	^{...}	^{...}	^{...}	Y	Y	Y	—	—	Y	Y	Y	Y	Y	—	Y	Y	—	Y
Texas	^{...}	^{...}	^{...}	Y	Y^{(‡)}	Y	Y	Y	Y	Y	Y	Y	Y	—	Y	Y	Y	Y
Iowa	^{...}	^{...}	^{...}	Y	Y	Y	Y	Y	Y	Y	Y	Y	Y	Y	Y	Y	Y	Y
Wisconsin	^{...}	^{...}	^{...}	Y	Y	Y	Y	Y	Y	Y	Y	Y	Y	Y	Y	Y	Y	Y
California	^{...}	^{...}	^{...}	Y	Y	Y^{(‡)}	Y	Y	Y	Y	Y	Y	Y	Y	Y	Y	Y	Y
Minnesota	^{...}	^{...}	^{...}	Y	Y	Y	Y	Y	Y	Y	Y	Y	Y	Y	Y	Y	Y	Y
Oregon	^{...}	^{...}	^{...}	Y	Y^{(×)}	Y^{(‡)}	Y	Y	Y	Y	Y	Y	Y	Y	Y	Y	Y	Y
Kansas	^{...}	^{...}	^{...}	Y	Y	Y	Y	Y	Y	Y	Y	—	Y	Y	Y	Y	Y	Y
West Virginia	^{...}	^{...}	^{...}	Y	Y	Y	Y	Y	Y	Y	Y	Y	—	Y	Y	Y	Y	Y
Nevada	^{...}	^{...}	^{...}	Y	Y	Y	Y	Y	Y	Y	Y	Y	Y	Y	Y	Y	—	Y
Nebraska	^{...}	^{...}	^{...}	^{...}	Y	Y	Y	Y	Y	Y	Y	—	Y	Y	Y	Y	Y	Y
Colorado	^{...}	^{...}	^{...}	^{...}	^{...}	^{...}	Y	Y	Y	Y	Y	Y	Y	Y	Y	Y	Y	Y
North Dakota	^{...}	^{...}	^{...}	^{...}	^{...}	^{...}	Y	Y	Y	Y	Y	—	Y	Y	Y	—	—	Y
South Dakota	^{...}	^{...}	^{...}	^{...}	^{...}	^{...}	Y	Y	Y	Y	Y	—	Y	Y	Y	—	—	Y
Montana	^{...}	^{...}	^{...}	^{...}	^{...}	^{...}	Y	Y	Y	Y	Y	Y	Y	Y	Y	Y	Y	Y
Washington	^{...}	^{...}	^{...}	^{...}	^{...}	^{...}	Y	Y	Y	Y	Y	Y	—	Y	Y	Y	Y	Y
Idaho	^{...}	^{...}	^{...}	^{...}	^{...}	^{...}	Y	Y	Y	Y	Y	Y	Y	Y	Y	Y	Y	Y
Wyoming	^{...}	^{...}	^{...}	^{...}	^{...}	^{...}	Y	Y	Y	Y	Y	Y	Y	Y	—	Y	Y	Y
Utah	^{...}	^{...}	^{...}	^{...}	^{...}	^{...}	N	N	Y	Y	Y	Y	Y	Y	Y	Y	—	Y
Oklahoma	^{...}	^{...}	^{...}	^{...}	^{...}	^{...}	Y	Y	Y	Y	Y	—	N	Y	—	Y	Y	Y
New Mexico	^{...}	^{...}	^{...}	^{...}	^{...}	^{...}	Y	Y	Y	Y	Y	Y	Y	Y	Y	Y	—	Y
Arizona	^{...}	^{...}	^{...}	^{...}	^{...}	^{...}	Y	Y	Y	Y	Y	Y	—	Y	—	Y	Y	Y
Alaska	^{...}	^{...}	^{...}	^{...}	^{...}	^{...}	^{...}	^{...}	^{...}	^{...}	^{...}	^{...}	^{...}	Y	Y	Y	Y	Y
Hawaii	^{...}	^{...}	^{...}	^{...}	^{...}	^{...}	^{...}	^{...}	^{...}	^{...}	^{...}	^{...}	^{...}	Y	Y	Y	Y	Y
State (in order of statehood)	1–10	11	12	13	14	15	16	17	18	19	20	21	22	23	24	25	26	27
State (in order of statehood)	Amendment																	

== Unratified amendments ==
=== Synopsis of each unratified amendment ===
Title	Subject	Status
Congressional Apportionment Amendment	Would strictly regulate the number of seats in the United States House of Representatives.	Pending since September 25, 1789. Latest ratification took place on June 27, 1792.
Titles of Nobility Amendment	Would strip citizenship from any United States citizen who accepts a title of nobility, or who accepts any present, pension, office or emolument from a foreign power without the consent of Congress.	Pending since May 1, 1810. Latest ratification took place on December 9, 1812.
Corwin Amendment	Would make the states' "domestic institutions" (i.e. slavery) impervious to the constitutional amendment procedures established in Article V and immune to abolition or interference from Congress.	Pending since March 2, 1861. Latest ratification took place on June 2, 1863.
Child Labor Amendment	Would empower the federal government to limit, regulate and prohibit child labor.	Pending since June 2, 1924. Latest ratification took place on February 25, 1937.
Equal Rights Amendment	Would have ensured the equality of rights by the federal or state governments based on sex.	Proposed March 22, 1972. Initial ratification period ended March 22, 1979; purported extension period ended June 30, 1982; amendment failed. (Note: Between 1972 and 1977, 35 states ratified the ERA. Three additional states ratified it between 2017 and 2020, purportedly bringing the number of ratifications to 38, or three-fourths of the states. In January 2020, after the Justice Department issued an opinion concluding that the deadline for the passage of the amendment expired at the time of the original 1979 deadline, the attorneys general of those three states filed suit in U.S. District Court in Washington, D.C. challenging that opinion. They asked to compel the archivist of the United States to certify the ERA as the Twenty-eighth Amendment to the U.S. Constitution. They lost in the district court and on appeal and chose not to ask the Supreme Court for review.)
District of Columbia Voting Rights Amendment	Would have treated the District of Columbia as if it were a state regarding representation in Congress, representation in the Electoral College, and participation in the process by which the Constitution is amended. Would also have repealed the 23rd Amendment.	Proposed August 22, 1978. Ratification period ended August 22, 1985; amendment failed.

=== Summary of ratification data for each unratified amendment ===
Y indicates that state ratified amendment
N indicates that state rejected amendment
Y^{(‡)} indicates that state ratified amendment after first rejecting it
Y^{(×)} indicates that state ratified amendment, but later rescinded that ratification
⋈ indicates that state did not complete action on amendment during stated ratification period.
⋈Y indicates that state ratified amendment after stated ratification period.
"" An empty cell indicates that state has not completed action on pending amendment.
State (in alphabetical order)	Congressional Apportionment	Titles of Nobility	Corwin	Child Labor	Equal Rights	District of Columbia Voting Rights
Alabama					⋈	⋈
Alaska					Y	⋈
Arizona				Y	⋈	⋈
Arkansas				Y	⋈	⋈
California				Y	Y	⋈
Colorado				Y	Y	⋈
Connecticut	N	N		N	Y	Y
Delaware	N	Y		N	Y	Y
Florida				N	⋈	⋈
Georgia	N	Y		N	⋈	⋈
Hawaii					Y	Y
Idaho				Y	Y^{(×) 1977}	⋈
Illinois			Y^{(×) 2022}	Y	⋈Y^{2018}	⋈
Indiana				Y^{(‡)}	Y	⋈
Iowa				Y	Y	Y
Kansas				Y^{(‡)}	Y	⋈
Kentucky	Y	Y	Y	Y^{(‡)}	Y^{(×) 1978}	⋈
Louisiana				N	⋈	Y
Maine				Y^{(‡)}	Y	Y
Maryland	Y	Y	Y^{(×) 2014}	N	Y	Y
Massachusetts	N	Y		N	Y	Y
Michigan				Y	Y	Y
Minnesota				Y^{(‡)}	Y	Y
Mississippi					⋈	⋈
Missouri				N	⋈	⋈
Montana				Y	Y	⋈
Nebraska					Y^{(×) 1973}	⋈
Nevada				Y	⋈Y^{2017}	⋈
New Hampshire	Y	Y		Y^{(‡)}	Y	⋈
New Jersey	Y	Y		Y	Y	Y
New Mexico				Y^{(‡)}	Y	⋈
New York	Y	N			Y	⋈
North Carolina	Y	Y		N	⋈	⋈
North Dakota				Y	Y^{(×) 2021}	⋈
Ohio		Y	Y^{(×) 1864}	Y	Y	Y
Oklahoma				Y	⋈	⋈
Oregon				Y	Y	Y
Pennsylvania	Y^{(‡)}	Y		Y^{(‡)}	Y	⋈
Rhode Island	Y	N	Y^{(×) 2026}		Y	Y
South Carolina	Y			N	⋈	⋈
South Dakota				N	Y^{(×) 1979}	⋈
Tennessee		Y		N	Y^{(×) 1974}	⋈
Texas				N	Y	⋈
Utah				Y^{(‡)}	⋈	⋈
Vermont	Y	Y		N	Y	⋈
Virginia	Y			N	⋈Y^{2020}	⋈
Washington				Y	Y	⋈
West Virginia				Y	Y	Y
Wisconsin				Y	Y	Y
Wyoming				Y	Y	⋈
Number of ratifications:	11	12	5 (× 4)	28	35 (× 6) (⋈Y 3)	16

== See also ==
- History of the United States Constitution
- Convention to propose amendments to the United States Constitution
