= District of Columbia federal voting rights =

Voting rights in District of Columbia

Demographics
- Minimum voting age: 18
- Preregistration age: 16
- Felon voting status: No prohibition

Voter registration
- Voter registration required: Yes
- Online voter registration: Yes (since 2015)
- Automatic voter registration: Yes (since 2018)
- Same-day registration: Yes
- Partisan affiliation: Yes

Voting process
- In-person early-voting status: seven days prior
- Postal ballot status: Yes (up to 15 days prior)
- Straight-ticket device status: No
- Election method: First-past-the-post (plurality)

Voter powers
- Ballot question rights: initiative and veto referendum
- Recall powers: For all local officials, except for the district delegate; incumbent may not be recalled during first and last years in office
- Federal representation level: Territory-level

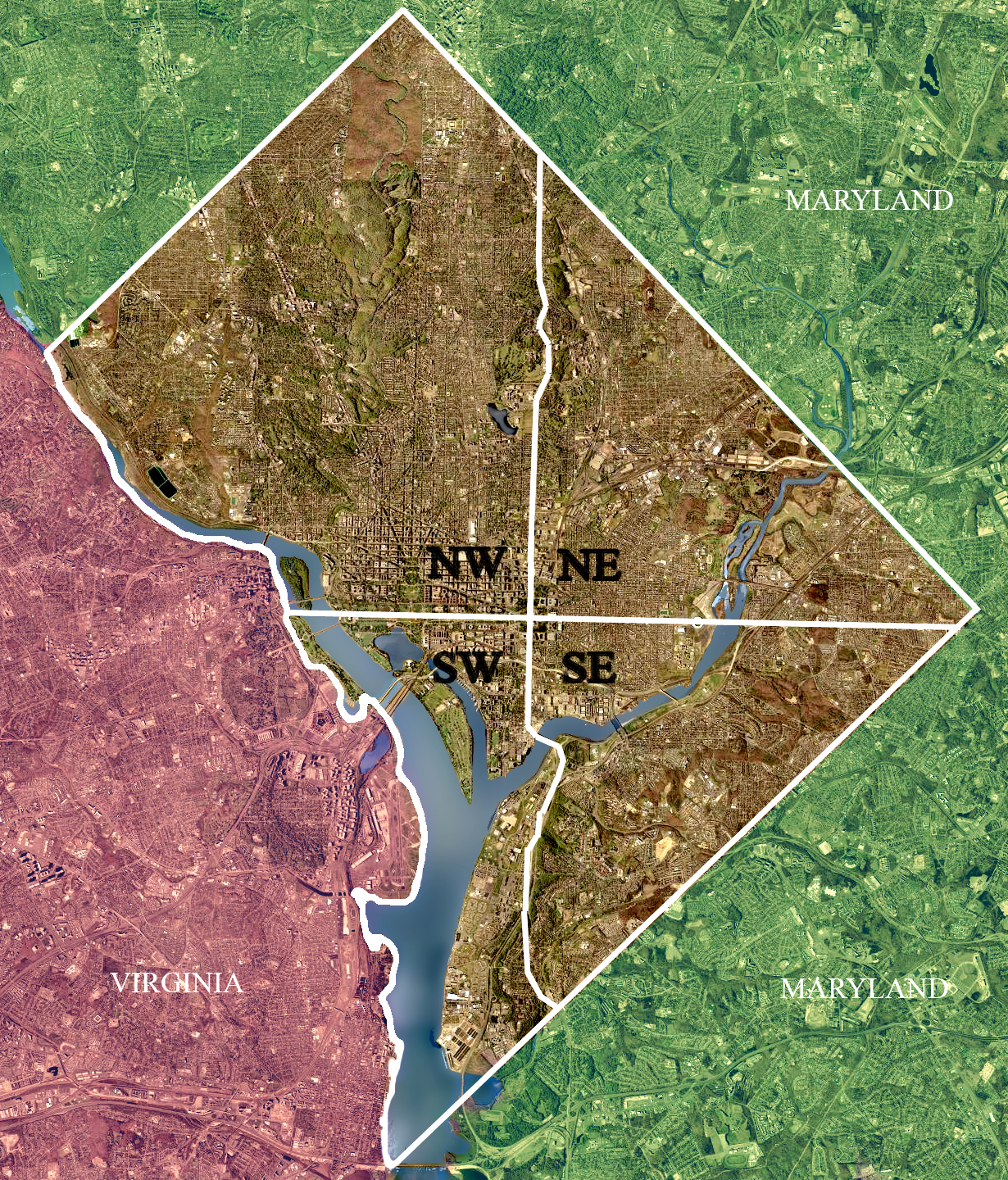
Satellite view of the District of Columbia in relation to the states of Maryland and Virginia.

The voting rights of citizens in the District of Columbia differ from the rights of citizens in the 50 U.S. states. The United States Constitution grants each state voting representation in both houses of the United States Congress. It defines the federal district as being outside of any state and does not grant it any voting representation in Congress. The Constitution grants Congress exclusive jurisdiction over the District in "all cases whatsoever".

In the House of Representatives, the District is represented by a delegate, who because of the constitutional provisions is not allowed to vote on the House floor but under House rules can vote on procedural matters and in congressional committees. D.C. residents have no representation in the Senate. The Twenty-third Amendment, adopted in 1961, effectively entitles the District to three (Note: The Twenty-third Amendment explicitly stipulates states that the District is entitled to choose "(a) number of electors of President and Vice President equal to the whole number of Senators and Representatives in Congress to which the District would be entitled if it were a State, but in no event more than the least populous State." Since each state is entitled to be represented by two senators and at least one representative, no state can be allocated fewer than three presidential electors, and by extension neither can the District. In every census since the amendment's adoption, both the District and several states have fallen far short of the threshold that would otherwise entitle them to more than one representative and/or three electoral votes.) electoral votes in the election of the president and vice president.

The District's lack of voting representation in Congress has been an issue since the capital's founding. Numerous proposals have been introduced to change this situation, including legislation and constitutional amendments, returning the district to Maryland, and making it into a new state. All proposals have been met with political or constitutional challenges, and there has been no change in the district's representation in Congress.

== History ==
In 1783, a crowd of disbanded Revolutionary War soldiers angry about not having been paid gathered to protest outside the building where the Continental Congress was meeting. The soldiers blocked the door and initially refused to allow the delegates to leave. Despite requests from Congress, the Pennsylvania state government declined to call out its militia to deal with the unruly mob, and so Congress was forced to adjourn to New Jersey abruptly. This led to the widespread belief that Congress needed control over the national capital. As James Madison wrote in The Federalist No. 43, "Without it, not only the public authority might be insulted and its proceedings interrupted with impunity; but a dependence of the members of the general government on the State comprehending the seat of the government, for protection in the exercise of their duty, might bring on the national councils an imputation of awe or influence, equally dishonorable to the government and dissatisfactory to the other members of the Confederacy." This belief resulted in the creation of a national capital, separate from any state, by the Constitution's District Clause.

The "District Clause" in Article I, Section 8, Clause 17 of the U.S. Constitution states:

[The Congress shall have Power] To exercise exclusive legislation in all cases whatsoever, over such District (not exceeding ten miles square) as may, by cession of particular states, and the acceptance of Congress, become the seat of the government of the United States.

There were some reasons why voting rights for the District were not addressed. It was effectively agreed at an early stage that the capital was to be in the South, and Northerners would have bitterly opposed any clause that would give the South even more voting power. Moreover, given the capital's planned location, many delegates assumed its permanent residents would primarily consist of slaves unable to vote in any case. They also expected the federal government would only operate on a part-time basis and assumed that those who were chosen to serve in federal office and those whose occupations would require them to spend time in the district would come mainly from the upper echelons of society and would therefore have the means to maintain residency (and voting rights) in their home states.

In 1788, the land on which the District was formed was ceded by Maryland. In 1790, Congress passed the Residence Act placing the District on the Potomac River between the Anacostia and Conococheague Creek with the exact location chosen by President George Washington. His selection was announced on January 24, 1791, and the Residence Act was amended to include land that Virginia had ceded in 1790. That land was returned to Virginia in 1847. The Congress did not officially move to the new federal capital until the first Monday in December 1800. During that time, the District was governed by a combination of a federally appointed Board of Commissioners, the state legislatures, and locally elected governments.

On February 27, 1801, only a few months after moving to the District, Congress passed the District of Columbia Organic Act of 1801 and incorporated the new federal District under its sole authority as permitted by the District Clause, making Congress the supreme source of all local laws. Since the District of Columbia ceased being part of any state and was not a state itself, the District's residents lost voting representation in Congress, the Electoral College, and in the Constitutional amendment process – consequences that did not go without protest. In January 1801, a meeting of District citizens was held which resulted in a statement to Congress noting that as a result of the impending Organic Act "we shall be completely disfranchised in respect to the national government, while we retain no security for participating in the formation of even the most minute local regulations by which we are to be affected. We shall be reduced to that deprecated condition of which we pathetically complained in our charges against Great Britain, of being taxed without representation." The following year, the Board of Commissioners was abolished, the City of Washington was incorporated, and a local government consisting of a locally elected 12-member council and a mayor appointed by the president was put in place.

In 1812, the District was given more significant home rule when the mayor became an elected official, chosen from among the group of 12 elected council members and 8 aldermen, and in 1820 the mayor became directly elected. Minor modifications were made over the years, but in 1871 the District government was again dramatically modified, getting a government more similar to that of the territories. Under this new government, the governor of the District was again appointed by the president, as were all members of one house of the District legislature.

The Congress abolished the territorial government in 1874 and replaced it with a presidentially appointed council, which by 1878 was considered the District's permanent government. It was later decided that this congressional act constituted the District's constitution, making the District the only territory that had not been allowed to write its constitution.

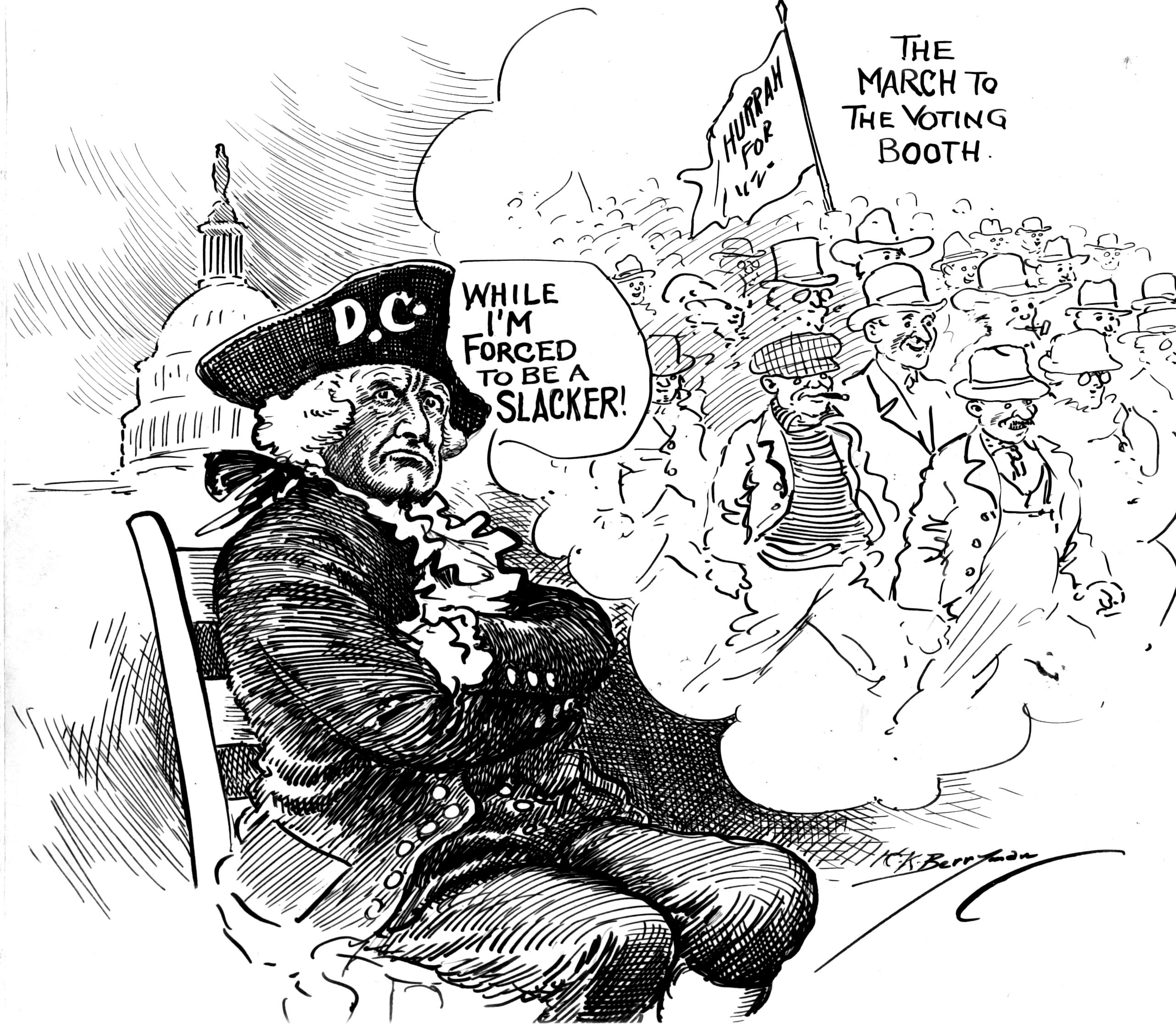
1931 cartoon by Clifford K. Berryman

By the 1930s, the District of Columbia was administered by House committees that had little regard for the concerns of the local population; the representative Ross A. Collins from Mississippi cut spending on local funds for welfare and education, stating that "my constituents wouldn't stand for spending money on niggers".

In the 1950s, as part of the more prominent Civil Rights Movement, interest emerged in giving the District full representation. As a compromise, the Twenty-third Amendment was adopted in 1961, granting the District some votes in the Electoral College in measure to their population, but no more than the smallest state. The Districts' residents have exercised this right since the presidential election of 1964.

The District of Columbia Home Rule Act of 1973 devolved certain Congressional powers over the District to a local government administered by an elected mayor, currently Muriel Bowser, and the thirteen-member Council of the District of Columbia. However, Congress retains the right to review and overturn any of the District's laws. Each of the District's eight wards elects a single member of the council, and five members, including the chairman, are elected at large.

In 1978, Congress submitted the District of Columbia Voting Rights Amendment to the states for ratification. It would have given the District full congressional representation, full participation in presidential elections, and the authority of a state regarding amending the Constitution.

In 1980, District voters approved the call of a constitutional convention to draft a proposed state constitution, just as U.S. territories had done before their admission as states. The proposed state constitution was ratified by District voters in 1982 for a new state to be called "New Columbia", but Congress has not granted statehood to the District. according to that proposed state constitution, the District still selects members of a shadow congressional delegation, consisting of two shadow senators and a shadow representative, to lobby the Congress to grant statehood. The Congress does not officially recognize these positions. Additionally, until May 2008, Congress prohibited the District from spending any funds on lobbying for voting representation or statehood.

On December 29, 2003, the Inter-American Commission on Human Rights of the Organization of American States concluded that the United States is violating the District of Columbia's rights under Articles II and XX of the American Declaration of the Rights and Duties of Man by denying District of Columbia citizens an adequate opportunity to participate in the Congress. The Commission reiterated the following recommendation to the United States: "Provide the Petitioners with an effective remedy, which includes adopting the legislative or other measures necessary to guarantee to the Petitioners the effective right to participate, directly or through freely chosen representatives and in general conditions of equality, in their national legislature".

A 2005 poll paid for by the advocacy group D.C. Vote but conducted by the non-partisan polling firm KRC Research, found that 82% of 1,007 adults believed that D.C. should have full congressional voting representation. A 2007 Washington Post poll of 788 adults found that 61% of those adults supported granting the District "a full voting" representative.

== Arguments for and against ==
There are arguments both for and against giving the District of Columbia voting representation in Congress.

=== Consent of the governed ===
Advocates of voting representation for the District of Columbia argue that as citizens living in the United States, the District's estimated 672,228 residents should have the same right to determine how they are governed as citizens of a state. At least as early as 1776, George Mason wrote in the Virginia Declaration of Rights:

VI. That elections of members to serve as representatives of the people, in assembly, ought to be free; and that all men, having sufficient evidence of permanent common interest with, and attachment to, the community, have the right of suffrage, and cannot be taxed or deprived of their property for public uses without their consent, or that of their representatives so elected, nor bound by any law to which they have not, in like manner, assented, for the public good.

VII. That all power of suspending laws, or the execution of laws, by any authority without consent of the representatives of the people, is injurious to their rights, and ought not to be exercised.

Justice Hugo Black described the right to vote as fundamental in Wesberry v. Sanders, 376 U.S. 1 (1964). He wrote, "No right is more precious in a free country than that of having a voice in the election of those who make the laws under which, as good citizens, we must live. Other rights, even the most basic, are illusory if the right to vote is undermined."

The Uniformed and Overseas Citizens Absentee Voting Act allows U.S. citizens to vote absentee for their home state's Congressional representatives from anywhere else in the world. If a U.S. citizen were to move to the District, that person would lose the ability to vote for a member of Congress. U.S. citizens who have permanently left the United States are still permitted to vote absentee for the Congress in the state where they last held residency. Scholars have argued that if U.S. citizens who are residents of other countries are allowed to vote in federal elections, then Congress can extend the same rights to residents of the nation's capital.

=== Constitutional provisions ===
The primary objection to legislative proposals to grant the District voting rights is that some Constitution provisions suggest that such an action would be unconstitutional. How the House of Representatives is to be composed is described in Article I, Section 2:

The House of Representatives shall be composed of Members chosen every second Year by the People of the several States, and the Electors in each State shall have the Qualifications requisite for Electors of the most numerous Branch of the State Legislature. No Person shall be a Representative ... who shall not when elected, be an Inhabitant of that State in which he shall be chosen. Representatives ... shall be apportioned among the several States which may be included within this Union, according to their respective Numbers[.]

Section 2 of the Fourteenth Amendment reaffirms Article I, Section 2 in that regard when it says:

Representatives shall be apportioned among the several States according to their respective numbers, counting the whole number of persons in each State, excluding Indians not taxed.

In addition, the Seventeenth Amendment correspondingly describes the election of "two Senators from each State". Those who believe D.C. voting rights legislation would be unconstitutional point out that the District of Columbia is not a U.S. state. Advocates of voting rights legislation claim that Article I, Section 8, Clause 17 (the District Clause), which grants Congress "exclusive" legislative authority over the District, allows the Congress to pass legislation that would grant D.C. voting representation in the Congress. The Twenty-third Amendment says the District is entitled to:

Many electors equal to the whole number of Senators and Representatives in Congress to which the District would be entitled if it were a State, but in no event more than the least populous State[.]

Since this amendment's adoption in 1961, the District has had three electoral votes in each presidential election.

=== Tax arguments ===
Unlike residents of U.S. territories such as Puerto Rico or Guam, which also have non-voting delegates, citizens of the District of Columbia are subject to all U.S. federal taxes. In the fiscal year 2007, D.C. residents and businesses paid $20.4 billion in federal taxes; more than the taxes collected from 19 states and the highest federal taxes per capita. This situation has given rise to the use of the phrase "End Taxation Without Representation" by those in favor of granting D.C. voting representation in the Congress. The slogan currently appears on the city's vehicle license plates. The issue of taxation without representation in the District of Columbia is not new. For example, in Loughborough v. Blake 18 U.S. 317 (1820), the Supreme Court said:

The difference between requiring a continent, with an immense population, to submit to be taxed by a government having no common interest with it, separated from it by a vast ocean, restrained by no principle of apportionment, and associated with it by no common feelings; and permitting the representatives of the American people, under the restrictions of our constitution, to tax a part of the society...which has voluntarily relinquished the right of representation and has adopted the whole body of Congress for its legitimate government, as is the case with the district, is too obvious not to present itself to the minds of all. Although in theory, it might be more congenial to the spirit of our institutions to admit a representative from the district, it may be doubted whether its interests would be rendered thereby more secure; and certainly, the constitution does not consider their want of a representative in Congress as exempting it from equal taxation.

In 1971, Susan Breakefield sued to recover three years of income taxes she paid to the District of Columbia because she said she was a victim of taxation without representation. Breakefield lost her case before both the District of Columbia Tax Court and the United States Court of Appeals, and the Supreme Court refused to hear the case.

Opponents of D.C. voting rights point out that Congress appropriates money directly to the D.C. government to help offset some of the city's costs. However, proponents of a tax-centric view against D.C. representation do not apply the same logic to the 32 states that received more money from the federal government in 2005 than they paid in taxes. Additionally, the federal government is exempt from paying city property taxes and the Congress prohibits the District from imposing a commuter tax on non-residents who work in the city. Limiting these revenue sources strains the local government's finances. Like the 50 states, D.C. receives federal grants for assistance programs such as Medicare, accounting for approximately 26% of the city's total revenue. Congress also appropriates money to the District's government to help offset some of the city's security costs; these funds totaled $38 million in 2007, approximately 0.5% of the District's budget. In addition to those funds, the U.S. government provides other services. For example, the federal government operates the District's court system, which had a budget of $272 million in 2008. Additionally, all federal law enforcement agencies, such as the U.S. Park Police, have jurisdiction in the city and help provide security. In total, the federal government provided about 33% of the District's general revenue. On average, federal funds formed about 30% of the states' general revenues in 2007.

=== Political considerations ===
Opponents of D.C. voting rights have also contended that the District is too small to warrant representation in the House and Senate. However, sponsors of voting rights legislation point out that both Wyoming and Vermont have a smaller population than the District of Columbia.

In modern times, all elections held in the district have been overwhelmingly won by the Democratic Party. The Democrats' support of increased D.C. representation in Congress and the Republicans' opposition to it has been alleged to be purely for self-serving reasons.

=== Human rights ===
Since 2006, the United Nations Human Rights Committee report has cited the United States for denying D.C. residents voting rights in violation of the International Covenant on Civil and Political Rights, a treaty the United States ratified in 1992.

In 2015, D.C. became a member of the Unrepresented Nations and Peoples Organization.

== Proposed reforms ==
Advocates for D.C. voting rights have proposed several competing reforms to increase the District's representation in Congress. These proposals generally involve either treating D.C. more like a state or allowing Maryland to take back the land it ceded to form the District.

=== Legislation ===
Several bills have been introduced in Congress to grant the District of Columbia voting representation in one or both houses of Congress.

The constitutional argument about whether Congress can provide the District of Columbia with a voting member in the House of Representatives, but not in the Senate, is heavily debated by each side. In Hepburn v. Ellzey (1805), the Supreme Court held that the right of residents of the District to sue residents of other states is not explicitly stated in Article III, Section 2. In National Mutual Insurance Co. v. Tidewater Transfer Co., Inc, 337 U.S. 582 (1949), the Supreme Court held that Congress could grant residents of the District of Columbia a right to sue residents of other states. However, opponents of the constitutionality of the legislation to grant D.C. voting rights point out that seven of the nine Justices in Tidewater rejected the view that the District is a “state” for other constitutional purposes. Opponents have also pointed out that if the power of Congress to "exercise exclusive legislation" over the District is used to supersede other sections of the Constitution, then the powers granted to Congress could potentially be unlimited.

On January 24, 2007, the Congressional Research Service (CRS) issued a report on this subject. According to the CRS, "it would appear likely that the Congress does not have authority to grant voting representation in the House of Representatives to the District."

A secondary criticism of a legislative remedy is that any law granting representation to the District could be undone in the future. Additionally, recent legislative proposals deal with granting representation in the House of Representatives only, which would still leave the issue of Senate representation for District residents unresolved. Thus far, no bill granting the District voting representation has passed both houses of Congress. A summary of legislation proposed since 2003 is provided below.

==== Proposals during the administration of George W. Bush ====
The Justice Department during the administration of President George W. Bush took the position that “explicit provisions of the Constitution do not permit Congress to grant congressional representation to the District through legislation.” Various such proposals were considered by the Congress during Bush's tenure:

- The No Taxation Without Representation Act of 2003 (H.R. 1285 and S. 617) would have treated D.C. as if it were a state to vote representation in the Congress, including the addition of two new senators; however, the bill never made it out of committee.
- The District of Columbia Fair and Equal House Voting Rights Act of 2006 (H.R. 5388) would have granted the District of Columbia voting representation in the House of Representatives only. This bill never made it out of committee.
- The District of Columbia Fair and Equal House Voting Rights Act of 2007 (H.R. 328) was the first to propose granting the District of Columbia voting representation in the House of Representatives while also temporarily adding an extra seat to Republican-leaning Utah to increase the membership of the House by two. The addition of an extra seat for Utah was meant to entice conservative lawmakers into voting for the bill by balancing the addition of a likely Democratic representative from the District. The bill still did not make it out of committee.
- The District of Columbia House Voting Rights Act of 2007 (H.R. 1433) was essentially the same bill as H.R. 328 introduced previously in the same Congress. This bill would still have added two additional seats to the House of Representatives, one for the District of Columbia and a second for Utah. The bill passed two committee hearings before finally being incorporated into a second bill of the same name. The new bill (H.R. 1905) passed the full House of Representatives in a vote of 214 to 177. The bill was then referred to the Senate (S. 1257) where it passed in committee. However, the bill could only get 57 of the 60 votes needed to break a Republican filibuster and consequently failed on the floor of the Senate. Following the defeated 2007 bill, voting rights advocates were hopeful that Democratic Party gains in both the House of Representatives and the Senate during the November 2008 elections would help pass the bill during the 111th Congress. Barack Obama, a Senate co-sponsor of the 2007 bill, said during his 2008 presidential campaign that as President he would continue to support the rights of DC residents.

==== Proposal during the administration of Barack Obama ====
On January 6, 2009, senators Joe Lieberman of Connecticut and Orrin Hatch of Utah and D.C. Delegate Eleanor Holmes Norton introduced the District of Columbia House Voting Rights Act of 2009 (H.R. 157 and S. 160). On February 26, 2009, the Senate passed S. 160 by a vote of 61–37. However, before passing the bill, the Senate adopted an amendment by Senator John Ensign that would have removed the authority of the District of Columbia to prohibit or unduly burden the ability of its residents to possess guns in their homes, on their property, or at their places of business. The Ensign amendment would have also repealed District legislation requiring gun registration, the District's ban on semiautomatic weapons, and the District's criminal penalties for possession of an unregistered handgun. Following the Senate's passage of the bill, as amended, House Majority Leader Steny Hoyer said on March 4 that he had postponed a House vote on the bill for at least a week, but it quickly became clear there were not enough votes to bring the bill to the floor without any amendments. Despite Hoyer's efforts to have the amendment's supporters withdraw it and propose it as separate legislation, and Norton's efforts to achieve consensus within the District's political community, where there is strong opposition to Ensign's amendment, Hoyer had to announce on June 9 that the bill was on hold indefinitely. In April 2010, the bill rather abruptly returned to the agenda, but the week a vote was expected, Hoyer declared the bill was unlikely to be passed during the 111th Congress. District politicians reiterated their opposition to the House passing the bill with Ensign's amendment. The House bill was reintroduced in the 112th Congress as H.R. 267.

The Justice Department has split over the constitutionality of legislation to give the District of Columbia voting representation in the House of Representatives. The Office of Legal Counsel reported to Attorney General Eric Holder that the proposed legislation would be unconstitutional, but Holder overrode that determination and instead obtained an opinion from officials of the United States Solicitor General's office that the legislation could be defended if it were challenged after its enactment.

=== Retrocession ===
Retrocession could return D.C. to the State of Maryland

The process of reuniting the District of Columbia with the state of Maryland is referred to as retrocession. The District was originally formed out of parts of both Maryland and Virginia which they had ceded to the Congress. However, Virginia's portion was returned to that state in 1846; all the land in present-day D.C. was once part of Maryland. If both the Congress and the Maryland state legislature agreed, jurisdiction over the District of Columbia could be returned to Maryland, possibly excluding a small tract of land immediately surrounding the United States Capitol, the White House, and the Supreme Court building. If the District were returned to Maryland, citizens in D.C. would gain voting representation in the Congress as residents of Maryland. One problem with any of these proposals, according to one Virginia Republican in a 1999 interview, is that the state of Maryland does not currently want to take the District back. Further, although the U.S. Constitution does not specify a minimum size for the District, retrocession may require a constitutional amendment, as the District's role as the seat of government is mandated by the Constitution's District Clause. Retrocession could also alter the idea of a separate national capital as envisioned by the Founding Fathers. It may also violate the Twenty-third Amendment to the United States Constitution's granting of votes in the electoral college, as they would still be constitutionally granted to the district.

A proposal related to retrocession was the District of Columbia Voting Rights Restoration Act of 2004 (H.R. 3709), which would have treated the residents of the District as residents of Maryland for congressional representation. Maryland's congressional delegation would then be apportioned accordingly to include the population of the District. Those in favor of such a plan argue that the Congress already has the necessary authority to pass such legislation without the constitutional concerns of other proposed remedies. From the foundation of the District in 1790 until the passage of the Organic Act of 1801, citizens living in D.C. continued to vote for members of Congress in Maryland or Virginia; legal scholars therefore propose that the Congress has the power to restore those voting rights while maintaining the integrity of the federal district. However, the proposed legislation never made it out of committee.

=== Amendment process ===
Given the potential constitutional problems with legislation granting the District voting representation in Congress, scholars have proposed that amending the U.S. Constitution would be the appropriate manner to grant D.C. full representation.

==== District of Columbia Voting Rights Amendment ====
In 1978, Congress proposed the District of Columbia Voting Rights Amendment. Under this amendment, the District of Columbia would have been "treated as though it were a State" regarding congressional representation, presidential elections (replacing the limited treatment under the Twenty-third Amendment), and the constitutional amendment process. The amendment had to be ratified within seven years to be adopted. The amendment was ratified by only 16 states, short of the requisite three-fourths (38) of the states, and so it expired in 1985. The amendment has never been resubmitted for ratification.

==== Murkowski proposal ====
Senator Lisa Murkowski (R-AK) believed the District of Columbia House Voting Rights Act of 2009 would be unconstitutional if adopted, and so she proposed a constitutional amendment to provide the District with one representative. Unlike the District of Columbia Voting Rights Amendment, Murkowski's proposal would not have provided the District any Senators or a role in the constitutional amendment process. Her proposal was referred to the Senate Judiciary Committee, which never acted on the proposal.

=== Statehood ===
Article IV, Section 3, Clause 1 of the Constitution gives Congress power to grant statehood. If the District were to become a state, congressional authority over the District would be terminated, and residents would have full voting representation in both houses of Congress; however, there are some constitutional considerations with any such statehood proposal. In 1980, local citizens passed an initiative calling for a constitutional convention for a new state. In 1982, voters ratified the constitution of a new state to be called "New Columbia". This campaign for statehood stalled. After the District of Columbia Voting Rights Amendment expired in 1985, another constitution for the state of New Columbia was drafted in 1987. The House of Representatives voted on D.C. statehood in November 1993, and the proposal was defeated by a vote of 277 to 153. Like retrocession, it has been argued that D.C. statehood would erode the principle of a separate federal territory as the seat of the federal government and that a constitutional amendment would be needed to avoid a violation of the Constitution's District Clause.

On April 15, 2016, District Mayor Muriel Bowser called for a citywide vote on whether the District should become the 51st state. This was followed by the release of a proposed state constitution. This constitution would make the mayor of the District of Columbia the governor of the proposed state, while the members of the City Council would make up the proposed House of Delegates. Despite requests for a different name, the proposed state constitution refers to the District as "New Columbia". The Council of the District of Columbia passed legislation making the proposed name "State of Washington, D.C." Under this proposed name "D.C." stands for "Douglass Commonwealth", a reference to the historic abolitionist Frederick Douglass. District residents voted overwhelmingly in favor of statehood in an advisory referendum but statehood legislation is unlikely to be enacted.

On June 26, 2020, during the 116th Congress, the House of Representatives passed a bill to grant statehood to the District (H.R. 51) by a vote of 232–180. H.R. 51 never received a vote in the Senate during the 116th Congress. The Office of Management and Budget said President Donald Trump's advisors would have recommended he veto H.R. 51 if it was passed by Congress. H.R. 51 was introduced in the 117th Congress. On January 26, 2021, Tom Carper of Delaware also introduced a similar bill, S. 51, "A bill to provide for the admission of the State of Washington, D.C. into the Union", into the United States Senate with a record 38 co-sponsors. On April 14, 2021, the United States House Committee on Oversight and Reform voted to pass H.R. 51, paving the way for the whole House to vote on it. The House passed that bill on April 22 with a vote of 216–208. On April 30, 2021, Democratic senator Joe Manchin came out against both H.R. 51 and S. 51, effectively dooming their passage.

== Comparison with other national capitals ==
Other countries with federal systems similar to the U.S. either extend full voting rights to residents of the federal capital, comparable to those of a constituent state, or have established their capital within a larger sub-national jurisdiction.

=== Federal states ===
==== Federal districts and territories ====
In the National Congress of Argentina, the Autonomous City of Buenos Aires has 25 seats in the Chamber of Deputies as well as three in the Senate, the same as a province.

In the Parliament of Australia, the Australian Capital Territory (ACT) has seats in both the House of Representatives and Senate. However, it was not until 1974 that residents of the ACT were able to vote for the latter. Unlike a state, which elects twelve senators, the ACT only elects two which is equal to the representation by the Northern Territory.

In the National Congress of Brazil, the Federal District has eight seats in the Chamber of Deputies, and three in the Federal Senate, the same number as a state.

In the Parliament of India, the National Capital Territory of Delhi is represented by seven members in the Lok Sabha (lower house) and three members in the Rajya Sabha (upper house), the latter being indirectly elected by the union territory's Legislative Assembly. Hence, it is represented on the same basis as the other states of the Union.

In the Parliament of Malaysia, the federal territory of Kuala Lumpur (the original federal capital and still the seat of parliament) has eleven MPs in the Dewan Rakyat (lower house) by members, while Putrajaya (the administrative center since 1999) has one. In the Dewan Negara (upper house), each of the federal territories is represented by two senators, but these are appointed on the advice of the Prime Minister. In contrast, those representing the states are indirectly elected by each state legislative assembly.

In the Congress of Mexico, Mexico City is represented in the Chamber of Deputies, as well as the Senate.

In the National Assembly of Nigeria, the Federal Capital Territory has two seats in the House of Representatives and one seat in the Senate, unlike the states, each of which has three.

In the Parliament of Pakistan, the Islamabad Capital Territory has two seats in the National Assembly and four in the Senate.

==== City-states ====
Berlin, the capital of Germany, is also both a city and one of the sixteen states and is represented on the same basis as the other states in the directly elected Bundestag, in which it has about twenty-four directly elected seats, and the Bundesrat, to which its Senate (or executive) sends four members.

Vienna, the capital of Austria, is also one of the nine states and is represented on the same basis as the other states in the Parliament, in the directly elected National Council and the indirectly elected Federal Council, to which its Gemeinderat and Landtag sends members.

Brussels, the capital of Belgium, is also one of the three regions of Belgium, forming the Brussels-Capital Region, and is represented in the Federal Parliament by fifteen directly elected members of the Chamber of Representatives and indirectly elected members of the Senate, chosen by the Parliament of the Brussels-Capital Region. In addition, as the capital of the Flemish Region and the Flemish Community, Brussels is also represented in the Flemish Parliament. However, its members have no voting rights on matters devolved to the Brussels-Capital Region. The city is also the capital of the French Community and has members in the Parliament of the French Community, elected by the French linguistic group of the Parliament of the Brussels-Capital Region.

==== Other federal capitals ====
Ottawa, the capital of Canada, has remained a part of Ontario, one of the country's four founding provinces, since the country's establishment in 1867. The National Capital Commission (NCC) administers and manages federal property in the city, but in almost all respects the city is subject to federal and provincial laws on the same basis as the rest of Ontario. The current elected municipal government and city boundaries of the Canadian capital were established in 2001 by provincial legislation. Residents of Ottawa elect representatives to both the Parliament of Canada and the Legislative Assembly of Ontario. Since Ontarian election law currently stipulates that the electoral boundaries for most provincial constituencies, including those in Ottawa, match those of federal constituencies, Ottawa elects the same number of legislators (currently eight) to each of the federal and provincial parliaments. In addition, several current and former members of the appointed Senate have self-identified as representing the city of Ottawa.

The legislature and executive of the Switzerland are located in Bern, but Swiss law does not designate a capital district of any kind. Bern voters are represented in the Federal Assembly as part of the Canton of Bern.

The city of Abu Dhabi is the capital of the United Arab Emirates, and is represented in the partially elected, quasi-parliamentary Federal National Council as part of the Emirate of Abu Dhabi.

=== Unitary states ===
Paris, the capital of France, is also one of the special status collectivities but is nevertheless represented on the same basis as the other departments in the National Assembly and the Senate.

London, the capital of England and of the United Kingdom, is both a ceremonial county and one of the nine officially-recognized regions of England. Although the formal creation of these regions is not regarded to have federalized England, London nevertheless now has an elected regional government, led by the Mayor of London. As of 2024, this is one of twelve areas in England with mayoral devolution. Greater London elects 73 out of 650 MPs to the Parliament of the United Kingdom. Until the Withdrawal of the United Kingdom from the European Union, it formed its constituency that elected members to the European Parliament.

Rome, the capital of Italy, is part of the Lazio 1 Constituency for what concerns elections to the Chamber of Deputies and part of the Lazio Constituency for what concerns elections to the Senate. Lazio, the region Rome belongs to, is constitutionally entitled to at least 3 senators, just as every other region aside from Molise (which is constitutionally entitled to at least 2 senators) and Valle d'Aosta (which is constitutionally entitled to at least 1 senator).

Tokyo, one of the 47 prefectures of Japan, is in many respects regarded as a prefecture like any other, although in English it is officially known as the Tokyo Metropolis and its elected government the Tokyo Metropolitan Government. Voters in the Japanese capital elect lawmakers to the National Diet on the same basis as in the rest of Japan.

== See also ==
- Voting rights in the United States
- Uniformed and Overseas Citizens Absentee Voting Act
- Federal voting rights in Puerto Rico
