= District of Columbia Voting Rights Amendment =

Proposed U.S. constitutional amendment

The District of Columbia Voting Rights Amendment was a proposed amendment to the United States Constitution that would have given the District of Columbia full representation in the United States Congress, full representation in the Electoral College system, and full participation in the process by which the Constitution is amended. It would have also repealed the Twenty-third Amendment, which granted the District of Columbia the same number of electoral votes as that of the least populous state but gave it no role in contingent elections.

The amendment was proposed by the U.S. Congress on August 22, 1978, and the legislatures of the 50 states were given seven years to consider it. Ratification by 38 states was necessary for the amendment to become part of the Constitution; only 16 states had ratified it when the seven-year time limit expired on August 22, 1985. This proposed constitutional amendment is the most recent one to have been sent to the states for their consideration.

== Text ==
Section 1. For purposes of representation in the Congress, election of the President and Vice President, and article V of this Constitution, the District constituting the seat of government of the United States shall be treated as though it were a State.

Section 2. The exercise of the rights and powers conferred under this article shall be by the people of the District constituting the seat of government, and as shall be provided by the Congress.

Section 3. The twenty-third article of amendment to the Constitution of the United States is hereby repealed.

Section 4. This article shall be inoperative, unless it shall have been ratified as an amendment to the Constitution by the legislatures of three-fourths of the several States within seven years from the date of its submission.

== Legislative history ==
Representative Don Edwards of California proposed House Joint Resolution 554 in the 95th Congress. The United States House of Representatives passed it on March 2, 1978, by a 289–127 vote, with 18 not voting.

=== Senate debate ===
The Senate considered the amendment on August 22, 1978. It had considerable bipartisan support, with both Majority Leader Robert Byrd (D–WV) and Minority Leader Howard Baker (R–TN) pressing for its passage. Debate centered on the Founding Fathers' original intentions for the capital city, the morality of denying 700,000 American citizens congressional representation, and the constitutionality of the proposal.

Support for the amendment came from across the political spectrum, although liberal Democrats were its most visible defenders. Democrat Patrick Leahy of Vermont rebutted arguments from conservatives that extending full voting rights to D.C. was unfair to rural states. Citing his state's rural nature, Leahy asserted that the proposal was not "a case of rural versus urban," but rather about "simple justice, overdue justice." Alaska Democrat Mike Gravel argued that the principles of democracy triumph over policies, expressing his support for the proposal despite the likelihood of the District's representatives "voting against the Alaskan position on d-2 land" and encouraging "more government rather than more implementation through the private sector."

Senate vote on H.J. Res. 554 To amend the Constitution to provide for representation of the District of Columbia in the Congress.
August 22, 1978	Party			Total votes
August 22, 1978	Democratic	Republican	Independent	Total votes
Yea	48	19	0	67
Nay	12	19	1	32
Result: Passed
Roll call vote: Senator / Party / State / Vote; James Abourezk / D / South Dakota / Yea; Maryon Pittman Allen / D / Alabama / Nay; Wendell R. Anderson / D / Minnesota / Yea; Howard Baker / R / Tennessee / Yea; Dewey F. Bartlett / R / Oklahoma / Nay; Birch Bayh / D / Indiana / Yea; Henry Bellmon / R / Oklahoma / Nay; Lloyd Bentsen / D / Texas / Yea; Joe Biden / D / Delaware / Yea; Edward Brooke / R / Massachusetts / Yea; Dale Bumpers / D / Arkansas / Yea; Quentin Burdick / D / North Dakota / Nay; Harry F. Byrd Jr. / I / Virginia / Nay; Robert Byrd / D / West Virginia / Yea; Howard Cannon / D / Nevada / Nay; Clifford P. Case / R / New Jersey / Yea; John Chafee / R / Rhode Island / Yea; Lawton Chiles / D / Florida / Nay; Frank Church / D / Idaho / Yea; Dick Clark / D / Iowa / Yea; Alan Cranston / D / California / Yea; John Culver / D / Iowa / Yea; Carl Curtis / R / Nebraska / Nay; John Danforth / R / Missouri / Yea; Dennis DeConcini / D / Arizona / Yea; Bob Dole / R / Kansas / Yea; Pete Domenici / R / New Mexico / Nay; John A. Durkin / D / New Hampshire / Yea; Thomas Eagleton / D / Missouri / Yea; James Eastland / D / Mississippi / Not Voting; Wendell Ford / D / Kentucky / Yea; Jake Garn / R / Utah / Nay; John Glenn / D / Ohio / Yea; Barry Goldwater / R / Arizona / Yea; Mike Gravel / D / Alaska / Yea; Robert P. Griffin / R / Michigan / Yea; Clifford Hansen / R / Wyoming / Nay; Gary Hart / D / Colorado / Yea; Floyd Haskell / D / Colorado / Yea; Orrin Hatch / R / Utah / Nay; Mark Hatfield / R / Oregon / Yea; Paul G. Hatfield / D / Montana / Nay; William Hathaway / D / Maine / Yea; S. I. Hayakawa / R / California / Nay; John Heinz / R / Pennsylvania / Yea; Jesse Helms / R / North Carolina / Nay; Kaneaster Hodges Jr. / D / Arkansas / Nay; Fritz Hollings / D / South Carolina / Yea; Walter Dee Huddleston / D / Kentucky / Yea; Muriel Humphrey / D / Minnesota / Yea; Daniel Inouye / D / Hawaii / Yea; Henry M. Jackson / D / Washington / Yea; Jacob Javits / R / New York / Yea; J. Bennett Johnston / D / Louisiana / Nay; Ted Kennedy / D / Massachusetts / Yea; Paul Laxalt / R / Nevada / Nay; Patrick Leahy / D / Vermont / Yea; Russell B. Long / D / Louisiana / Nay; Richard Lugar / R / Indiana / Yea; Warren Magnuson / D / Washington / Yea; Charles Mathias / R / Maryland / Yea; Spark Matsunaga / D / Hawaii / Yea; Jim McClure / R / Idaho / Nay; George McGovern / D / South Dakota / Yea; Thomas J. McIntyre / D / New Hampshire / Yea; John Melcher / D / Montana / Nay; Howard Metzenbaum / D / Ohio / Yea; Robert Burren Morgan / D / North Carolina / Nay; Daniel Patrick Moynihan / D / New York / Yea; Edmund Muskie / D / Maine / Yea; Gaylord Nelson / D / Wisconsin / Yea; Sam Nunn / D / Georgia / Yea; Bob Packwood / R / Oregon / Yea; James B. Pearson / R / Kansas / Yea; Claiborne Pell / D / Rhode Island / Yea; Charles H. Percy / R / Illinois / Yea; William Proxmire / D / Wisconsin / Yea; Jennings Randolph / D / West Virginia / Yea; Abraham Ribicoff / D / Connecticut / Yea; Donald Riegle / D / Michigan / Yea; William Roth / R / Delaware / Nay; Paul Sarbanes / D / Maryland / Yea; Jim Sasser / D / Tennessee / Yea; Harrison Schmitt / R / New Mexico / Nay; Richard Schweiker / R / Pennsylvania / Nay; William L. Scott / R / Virginia / Nay; John Sparkman / D / Alabama / Yea; Robert Stafford / R / Vermont / Yea; John C. Stennis / D / Mississippi / Nay; Ted Stevens / R / Alaska / Nay; Adlai Stevenson III / D / Illinois / Yea; Richard Stone / D / Florida / Yea; Herman Talmadge / D / Georgia / Yea; Strom Thurmond / R / South Carolina / Yea; John Tower / R / Texas / Nay; Malcolm Wallop / R / Wyoming / Nay; Lowell Weicker / R / Connecticut / Yea; Harrison A. Williams / D / New Jersey / Yea; Milton Young / R / North Dakota / Nay; Edward Zorinsky / D / Nebraska / Nay

Several Republicans also spoke out in support. Michigan's Robert P. Griffin noted the United States' unusual treatment of D.C., stating, "In only one other country in the world—Brazil—are residents of the capital city denied representation in their national legislature." Edward Brooke of Massachusetts brought up his Washington upbringing in expressing his support for the amendment, while Bob Dole reminded colleagues that the GOP had included full voting representation for the District of Columbia in its party platform adopted at the 1976 Republican National Convention. Lowell Weicker of Connecticut went as far as to argue that the proposed amendment was not enough, instead advocating for the District of Columbia's admission as a state.

One particularly notable supporter of the amendment was Strom Thurmond (R–SC), notorious for his longtime support of racial segregation. Reflecting his gradual shift toward more moderate views on race, he supported the amendment despite the District of Columbia's black-majority population. Noting the United States' commitment to exemplifying the ideals of democracy, he asked, "How can we do that when three-quarters of a million people are not allowed to have voting representation in the capital city of this Nation?"

Opposition to the amendment, meanwhile, came almost exclusively from conservatives. Ted Stevens (R–AK) was a particularly vocal foe:

"If this area is tired of being the seat of Government, if it does not wish to vote in Maryland and not have the seat of Government moved, I would be happy to suggest the Capitol be moved. We went through it once in the forties. I would be more than happy to go through it again. And I shall propose it next year. Let us move the Capitol. Let us build a Federal City in which nobody lives, in which there are just buildings and the seat of Government. Let us make Washington, D.C., a historical monument, another part of the Park Service, if you will. So many people are interested in making much of my State a national park. I will be delighted to assist in making this a national park so everybody in the world will come and see how we ran the Government of the United States for the first 200 years."

Other opponents of the amendment proposed more serious compromises. Mississippi Democrat John C. Stennis advocated for giving the District only one senator, while Oklahoma's Dewey F. Bartlett tried to alter the amendment to assure that Congress could not exercise committee oversight of D.C. There was considerable discussion of retroceding the District of Columbia back into Maryland, although Maryland Senators Charles Mathias and Paul Sarbanes quickly doused the idea.

Orrin Hatch alleged that the proposal contradicted Article V of the United States Constitution, which guarantees that "no State, without its consent, shall be deprived of its equal Suffrage in the Senate." Hatch claimed this meant that all 50 states would have to approve the amendment. In a blistering retort, Ted Kennedy said, "It fails in terms of logic. How can a constitutional amendment be unconstitutional?"

The amendment ultimately passed with the support of 48 Democrats and 19 Republicans. Exactly 80% of the Democratic caucus voted for the amendment, while Republicans split evenly. The chamber's sole independent, Harry F. Byrd Jr. of Virginia, voted nay.

=== Vote in the legislatures ===
With that, the District of Columbia Voting Rights Amendment was submitted to the state legislatures for ratification. The Congress, via Section 4, included the requirement that ratification by three-fourths (38) of the states be completed within seven years following its passage by the Congress (i.e., August 22, 1985) in order for the proposed amendment to become part of the Constitution. By placing the ratification deadline in the text of the proposed amendment, it made clear that the deadline could not be extended without a separate amendment to the Constitution. This was in contrast to the ratification deadline of the Equal Rights Amendment, which was restricted by statute and not the amendment itself, and which later became the subject of legal debate.

== Ratification history ==
Ratification status of the District of Columbia Voting Rights Amendment Ratified amendment

Ratification by the legislatures of at least 38 of the 50 states by August 22, 1985, was necessary for the District of Columbia Voting Rights Amendment to become part of the Constitution. During the seven-year period specified by Congress it was ratified by only 16 states and so failed to be adopted. The amendment was ratified by the following states:

1. New Jersey on September 11, 1978
2. Michigan on December 13, 1978
3. Ohio on December 21, 1978
4. Minnesota on March 19, 1979
5. Massachusetts on March 19, 1979
6. Connecticut on April 11, 1979
7. Wisconsin on November 1, 1979
8. Maryland on March 19, 1980
9. Hawaii on April 17, 1980
10. Oregon on July 6, 1981
11. Maine on February 16, 1983
12. West Virginia on February 23, 1983
13. Rhode Island on May 13, 1983
14. Iowa on January 19, 1984
15. Louisiana on June 24, 1984
16. Delaware on June 28, 1984

The text of the District of Columbia Voting Rights Amendment states that it will be "inoperative" if ratified past the original seven-year deadline.

== Effects had it been adopted ==
Had it been adopted, this proposed amendment would have allowed the District of Columbia and its population to participate in federal institutions on equal footing with the states, but it would not have made the district into a state, nor affected Congress's authority over it. The District of Columbia would have been given full representation in both houses of Congress, so that it would have two senators and a variable number of representatives based on population.

The proposed amendment would also have repealed the Twenty-third Amendment, which does not allow the district to have more electoral votes "than the least populous State", nor does it grant the District of Columbia any role in contingent elections of the president by the House of Representatives (or of the vice president by the Senate). In contrast, this proposed amendment would have provided the district full participation in presidential (and vice presidential) elections.

Finally, the proposed amendment would have allowed the Council of the District of Columbia, the Congress, or the people of the district (depending on how the amendment would have been interpreted) to decide whether to ratify any proposed amendment to the Constitution, or to apply to the Congress for a convention to propose amendments to the United States Constitution, just as a state's legislature can under the Constitutional amendment process laid out in Article V of the Constitution.

== See also ==
- District of Columbia voting rights
- List of amendments to the United States Constitution, amendments sent to the states, both ratified and unratified
- List of proposed amendments to the United States Constitution, amendments proposed in Congress but never sent to the states for ratification
