= List of U.S. states and territories by Human Development Index score =

Human Development Index in US by state and Territory

This article lists the Human Development Index rating of each U.S. state, territory, and federal district according to the UN.

Rank	State, federal district, or territory	HDI (2023) (Note: In this column, data for the 50 states and the District of Columbia is from 2023.)
1	Massachusetts	0.961
1	New Hampshire	0.961
3	Minnesota	0.960
4	Colorado	0.958
5	Hawaii	0.957
5	Washington	0.957
7	Connecticut	0.955
7	Vermont	0.955
—	District of Columbia	0.952
9	Oregon	0.949
10	New Jersey	0.948
10	Virginia	0.948
12	Maryland	0.947
13	North Dakota	0.945
13	Rhode Island	0.945
15	New York	0.942
15	Utah	0.942
17	Nebraska	0.941
17	Wyoming	0.941
19	Alaska	0.940
19	California	0.940
19	Illinois	0.940
19	Maine	0.940
19	South Dakota	0.940
24	Wisconsin	0.939
25	Pennsylvania	0.938
	United States	0.938
26	Florida	0.935
27	Iowa	0.934
27	Montana	0.934
29	Delaware	0.933
30	Kansas	0.931
31	Idaho	0.927
32	Michigan	0.923
33	Nevada	0.921
34	Ohio	0.919
35	North Carolina	0.918
36	Arizona	0.917
36	Texas	0.917
38	(Georgia (U.S. state)) Georgia	0.915
38	Missouri	0.915
40	Indiana	0.913
41	South Carolina	0.904
41	Tennessee	0.904
43	Oklahoma	0.902
—	Guam	0.901 (2017)
44	New Mexico	0.895
—	U.S. Virgin Islands	0.894 (2017)
45	Louisiana	0.892
46	Arkansas	0.890
46	Kentucky	0.890
48	Alabama	0.887
49	West Virginia	0.880
50	Mississippi	0.868
—	Puerto Rico	0.899
—	Northern Mariana Islands	0.875 (2017)
—	American Samoa	0.827 (2017)

== See also ==
- List of countries by Human Development Index
