= Lawrence G. Sager =

American academic

Lawrence Gene Sager (born 1941) is a former dean of the University of Texas School of Law. He holds the Alice Jane Drysdale Sheffield Regents Chair. Sager, who joined the Law School faculty in 2002, is the 13th dean in the Law School's 123-year history. He is best known for his theory of underenforcement.

Sager graduated from Pomona College in 1963 and from the Columbia Law School in 1966. He taught for more than 25 years at New York University School of Law. At Texas, he has also been deeply involved with the Law School's faculty recruitment efforts, which include luring corporate law expert Bernard Black from Stanford Law School in 2004 and health law scholar William Sage from Columbia Law School in 2006. He served as chair of the Law School's Appointments Committee during the 2005–06 academic years. Sager has also taught as a visiting professor at Harvard Law School, Princeton University, Boston University School of Law, UCLA School of Law, and University of Michigan Law School.

Sager is the author of two books: Justice in Plainclothes: A Theory of American Constitutional Practice (Yale University Press, 2004) and, with Christopher Eisgruber, Religious Freedom and the Constitution (Harvard University Press, 2007).

== University of Texas deanship ==
Sager rose to prominence as a legal scholar while teaching at the New York University (NYU) School of Law. Along with NYU's John Sexton, Sager has been credited as one of the chief architects of New York University Law School's precipitous rise in the national rankings during the 1990s. Sager joined the University of Texas at Austin (UT) School of Law faculty in 2002 and was appointed as a dean in 2006.

In 2006, Sager was appointed as a dean of the law school. In writing about Sager, Ronald Dworkin said: "Sager is subtle, fast and deep . . . You should hire him." During his tenure, Sager "made important advancements" including raising nearly $80 million in donations, hiring 16 tenure and tenure-track faculty members, establishing a dual-degree program with a Mexican law school and launching a scholarly center focusing on global energy, environmental and arbitrational issues."

Sager resigned from the Deanship in December 2011 after being asked to resign by then-University of Texas President William Powers Jr. While Powers did not specify the exact reasons for requesting Sager's resignation, the Texas Tribune reported that "at the center of the conflict" was a forgivable loan / deferred compensation program created by the University of Texas Law School Foundation in 2003 while Powers was the Dean of the Law School, under which Dean Sager had been awarded a forgivable loan. While the University of Texas System's general counsel reported that the program was reportedly subject to different processes, he also noted that the program in general was "a highly effective and sensible recruiting and retention tool" for top faculty.

== Practical jokes ==
Sager was the subject of several well-publicized practical jokes during his time as dean, including a 2009 April Fool's Day prank in which the Student Bar Association at the University of Texas sent out an email purporting to be from Sager in which "Sager" claimed he was retiring from the law school to raise emus in the Texas hill country. The Student Bar Association also opened up an Etsy shop under Sager's name.
