= Article Five of the United States Constitution =

Portion of the US Constitution regarding amendment procedure

Article Five of the United States Constitution describes the procedure for altering the Constitution. Under Article Five, the process to alter the Constitution consists of proposing an amendment or amendments, and subsequent ratification.

Amendments may be proposed either by the Congress with a two-thirds vote in both the House of Representatives and the Senate; or by a convention to propose amendments called by Congress at the request of two-thirds of the state legislatures. To become part of the Constitution, an amendment must then be ratified by either—as determined by Congress—the legislatures of three-quarters of the states or by ratifying conventions conducted in three-quarters of the states, a process that has been utilized only once, with the 1933 ratification of the Twenty-First Amendment (the repeal of Prohibition). The vote of each state (to either ratify or reject a proposed amendment) carries equal weight, regardless of a state's population or length of time in the Union. Article Five is silent regarding deadlines for the ratification of proposed amendments, but most amendments proposed since 1917 have included a deadline for ratification. Legal scholars generally agree that the amending process of Article Five can itself be amended by the procedures laid out in Article Five, but there is some disagreement over whether Article Five is the exclusive means of amending the Constitution.

In addition to defining the procedures for altering the Constitution, Article Five also shields three clauses in Article One from ordinary amendment by attaching stipulations. Regarding two of the clauses—one concerning importation of slaves and the other apportionment of direct taxes—the prohibition on amendment was absolute but of limited duration, expiring in 1808; the third was without an expiration date but less absolute: "no state, without its consent, shall be deprived of its equal Suffrage in the Senate." Scholars disagree as to whether this shielding clause can itself be amended by the procedures laid out in Article Five.

== Text ==
The Congress, whenever two thirds of both Houses shall deem it necessary, shall propose Amendments to this Constitution, or, on the Application of the Legislatures of two thirds of the several States, shall call a Convention for proposing Amendments, which, in either Case, shall be valid to all Intents and Purposes, as Part of this Constitution, when ratified by the Legislatures of three fourths of the several States, or by Conventions in three fourths thereof, as the one or the other Mode of Ratification may be proposed by the Congress; Provided that no Amendment which may be made prior to the Year One thousand eight hundred and eight shall in any Manner affect the first and fourth Clauses in the Ninth Section of the first Article; and that no State, without its Consent, shall be deprived of its equal Suffrage in the Senate.

== Procedures for amending the Constitution ==
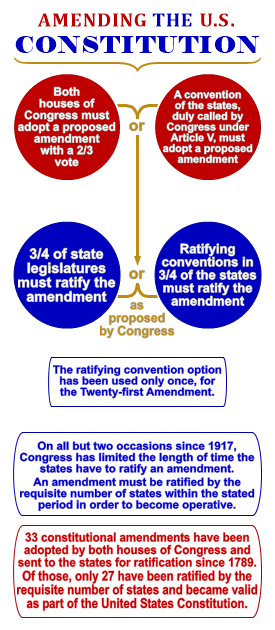
The U.S. constitutional amendment process

Thirty-three amendments to the United States Constitution have been approved by the Congress and sent to the states for ratification. Twenty-seven of these amendments have been ratified and are now part of the Constitution. The first ten amendments were adopted and ratified simultaneously and are known collectively as the Bill of Rights. Six amendments adopted by Congress and sent to the states have not been ratified by the required number of states and are not part of the Constitution. Four of these amendments are still technically open and pending, one is closed and has failed by its own terms, and one is closed and has failed by the terms of the resolution proposing it. All totaled, more than 10,000 measures to amend the Constitution have been proposed in Congress.

=== Proposing amendments ===
Article V provides two methods for amending the nation's frame of government. The first method authorizes Congress, "whenever two-thirds of both houses shall deem it necessary," (Note: In the National Prohibition Cases (1920), the United States Supreme Court ruled that the requisite two-thirds vote in each house for proposing amendments is a vote of two-thirds of the members present—assuming that a quorum exists at the time that the vote is cast—and not a vote of two-thirds of the entire membership, present and absent, of the two houses of Congress.) to propose constitutional amendments. The second method requires Congress, "on the application of the legislatures of two-thirds of the several states" (34 as of 1959), to "call a convention for proposing amendments".

This duality in Article V is the result of compromises made during the 1787 Constitutional Convention between two groups, one maintaining that the national legislature should have no role in the constitutional amendment process and another contending that proposals to amend the constitution should originate in the national legislature and their ratification should be decided by state legislatures or state conventions. Regarding the consensus amendment process crafted during the convention, James Madison (writing in The Federalist No. 43) declared:

It guards equally against that extreme facility which would render the Constitution too mutable; and that extreme difficulty which might perpetuate its discovered faults. It moreover equally enables the General and the State Governments to originate the amendment of errors, as they may be pointed out by the experience on one side, or on the other.

Each time the Article V process has been initiated since 1789, the first method for crafting and proposing amendments has been used. All 33 amendments submitted to the states for ratification originated in Congress. The second method, the convention option, a political tool that Alexander Hamilton (writing in the Federalist No. 85) argued would enable state legislatures to "erect barriers against the encroachments of the national authority," has yet to be invoked.

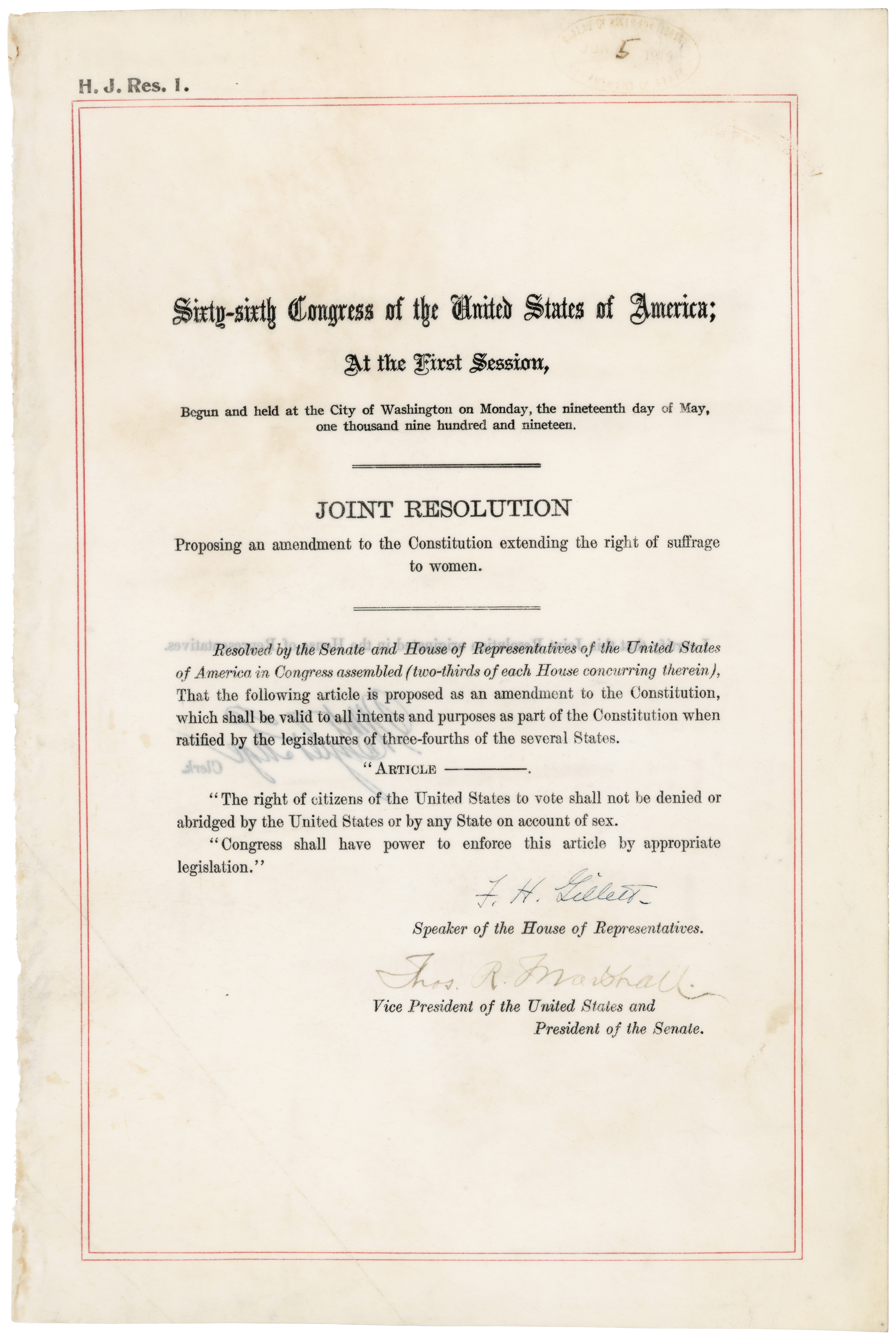
Resolution proposing the Nineteenth Amendment

When the 1st Congress considered a series of constitutional amendments, it was suggested that the two houses first adopt a resolution indicating that they deemed amendments necessary. This procedure was not used. Instead, both the House and the Senate proceeded directly to consideration of a joint resolution, thereby implying that both bodies deemed amendments to be necessary. Also, when initially proposed by James Madison, the amendments were designed to be interwoven into the relevant sections of the original document. Instead, they were approved by Congress and sent to the states for ratification as supplemental additions (codicils) appended to it. Both these precedents have been followed ever since.

Once approved by Congress, the joint resolution proposing a constitutional amendment does not require presidential approval before it goes out to the states. While Article I Section 7 provides that all federal legislation must, before becoming Law, be presented to the president for his or her signature or veto, Article V provides no such requirement for constitutional amendments approved by Congress or by a federal convention. Thus, the president has no official function in the process. (Note: In 1861, President James Buchanan took the unprecedented step of signing the Corwin Amendment, a last-ditch effort to prevent the American Civil War. In 1865, President Abraham Lincoln signed what would become the Thirteenth Amendment, and Congress subsequently passed a resolution affirming that the presidential signature was unnecessary.) In Hollingsworth v. Virginia (1798), the Supreme Court affirmed that it is not necessary to place constitutional amendments before the president for approval or veto.

Three times in the 20th century, concerted efforts were undertaken by proponents of particular amendments to secure the number of applications necessary to summon an Article V Convention. These included conventions to consider amendments to (1) provide for the popular election of U.S. Senators; (2) permit the states to include factors other than equality of population in drawing state legislative district boundaries; and (3) to propose an amendment requiring the U.S. budget to be balanced under most circumstances. The campaign for a popularly elected Senate is frequently credited with "prodding" the Senate to join the House of Representatives in proposing what became the Seventeenth Amendment to the states in 1912, while the latter two campaigns came very close to meeting the two-thirds threshold in the 1960s and 1980s, respectively.

=== Ratification of amendments ===
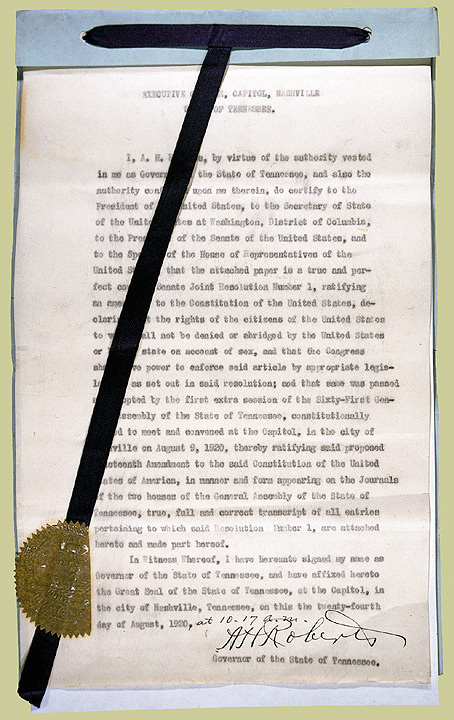
Tennessee certificate of ratification of the Nineteenth Amendment. With this ratification, the amendment became valid as a part of the Constitution.

After being officially proposed, either by Congress or a national convention of the states, a constitutional amendment must then be ratified by three-fourths (38 out of 50) of the states. Congress is authorized to choose whether a proposed amendment is sent to the state legislatures or to state ratifying conventions for ratification. Amendments ratified by the states under either procedure are indistinguishable and have equal validity as part of the Constitution. Of the 33 amendments submitted to the states for ratification, the state convention method has been used for only one, the Twenty-first Amendment. In United States v. Sprague (1931), the Supreme Court affirmed the authority of Congress to decide which mode of ratification will be used for each individual constitutional amendment. The Court had earlier, in Hawke v. Smith (1920), upheld the Ohio General Assembly's ratification of the Eighteenth Amendment—which Congress had sent to the state legislatures for ratification—after Ohio voters successfully vetoed that approval through a popular referendum. The Court ruled that a provision in the Ohio Constitution reserving to the state's voters the right to challenge and overturn its legislature's ratification of federal constitutional amendments was unconstitutional.

An amendment becomes an operative part of the Constitution when it is ratified by the necessary number of states, rather than on the later date when its ratification is certified. No further action by Congress or anyone is required. On three occasions, Congress has, after being informed that an amendment has reached the ratification threshold, adopted a resolution declaring the process successfully completed. (Note: 1868 regarding the Fourteenth Amendment, 1870 regarding the Fifteenth Amendment, and 1992 regarding the Twenty-seventh Amendment) Such actions, while perhaps important for political reasons, are, constitutionally speaking, unnecessary.

The archivist of the United States is charged with responsibility for administering the ratification process under the provisions of 1 U.S. Code § 106b. The archivist officially notifies the states, by a registered letter to each state's Governor, that an amendment has been proposed. Each Governor then formally submits the amendment to their state's legislature (or ratifying convention). When a state ratifies a proposed amendment, it sends the archivist an original or certified copy of the state's action. Upon receiving the necessary number of state ratifications, it is the duty of the archivist to issue a certificate proclaiming a particular amendment duly ratified and part of the Constitution. (Note: In recent history, the signing of the certificate of ratification has become a ceremonial function attended by various dignitaries. President Lyndon Johnson signed the certifications for the Twenty-fourth Amendment and Twenty-fifth Amendment as a witness. When the Administrator of General Services, Robert Kunzig, certified the adoption of the Twenty-sixth Amendment on July 5, 1971, President Nixon along with Julianne Jones, Joseph W. Loyd Jr., and Paul Larimer of the "Young Americans in Concert" signed as witnesses. On May 18, 1992, the archivist of the United States, Don W. Wilson, certified that the Twenty-seventh Amendment had been ratified, and the Director of the Federal Register, Martha Girard, signed the certification as a witness.) The amendment and its certificate of ratification are then published in the Federal Register and United States Statutes at Large. This serves as official notice to Congress and to the nation that the ratification process has been successfully completed.

This process, argues Steven Levitsky and Daniel Ziblatt, means the U.S. Constitution is the most difficult in the world to amend "by a lot".

== Ratification deadline and extension ==
The Constitution is silent on the issue of whether or not Congress may limit the length of time that the states have to ratify constitutional amendments sent for their consideration. It is also silent on the issue of whether or not Congress, once it has sent an amendment that includes a ratification deadline to the states for their consideration, can extend that deadline.

=== Deadlines ===
The practice of limiting the time available to the states to ratify proposed amendments began in 1917 with the Eighteenth Amendment. All amendments proposed since then, with the exception of the Nineteenth Amendment and the (still pending) Child Labor Amendment, have included a time limit of seven years to ratify the amendment, either in the body of the proposed amendment, or in the joint resolution transmitting it to the states. (Note: Congress incorporated the ratification deadline for the Eighteenth, Twentieth, Twenty-first, and Twenty-second amendments into the body of the amendment, so these amendments' deadlines are now part of the Constitution. The failed District of Columbia Voting Rights Amendment also contained a ratification deadline clause. Congress inserted the ratification deadline for the Twenty-third, Twenty-fourth, Twenty-fifth and Twenty-sixth amendments into the joint resolutions transmitting them to the state legislatures in order to avoid including extraneous language in the Constitution. This practice was also followed for the failed Equal Rights Amendment.) The ratification deadline "clock" begins running on the day final action is completed in Congress. An amendment may be ratified at any time after final congressional action, even if the states have not yet been officially notified.

In Dillon v. Gloss (1921), the Supreme Court upheld Congress's power to prescribe time limitations for state ratifications and intimated that clearly out of date proposals were no longer open for ratification. Granting that it found nothing express in Article V relating to time constraints, the Court yet allowed that it found—intimated in the amending process—a "strongly suggest[ive]" argument that proposed amendments are not open to ratification for all time or by States acting at widely separate times. The court subsequently, in Coleman v. Miller (1939), modified its opinion considerably. In that case, related to the proposed Child Labor Amendment, it held that the question of timeliness of ratification is a political and non-justiciable one, leaving the issue to Congress's discretion. It would appear that the length of time elapsing between proposal and ratification is irrelevant to the validity of the amendment. Based upon this precedent, the Archivist of the United States, on May 18, 1992, proclaimed the Twenty-seventh Amendment as having been ratified when it surpassed the "three fourths of the several states" plateau for becoming a part of the Constitution. It had been submitted to the states for ratification—without a ratification deadline—on September 25, 1789, an unprecedented time period of 202 years, 7 months and 12 days.

=== Extensions ===
Whether once it has prescribed a ratification period Congress may extend the period without necessitating action by already-ratified States embroiled Congress, the states, and the courts in argument with respect to the proposed Equal Rights Amendment (Sent to the states on March 22, 1972, with a seven-year ratification time limit attached). In 1978 Congress, by simple majority vote in both houses, extended the original deadline by 3 years, 3 months and 8 days (through June 30, 1982).

The amendment's proponents argued that the fixing of a time limit and the extending of it were powers committed exclusively to Congress under the political question doctrine and that in any event Congress had power to extend. It was argued that inasmuch as the fixing of a reasonable time was within Congress' power and that Congress could fix the time either in advance or at some later point, based upon its evaluation of the social and other bases of the necessities of the amendment, Congress did not violate the Constitution when, once having fixed the time, it subsequently extended the time. Proponents recognized that if the time limit was fixed in the text of the amendment Congress could not alter it because the time limit as well as the substantive provisions of the proposal had been subject to ratification by a number of States, making it unalterable by Congress except through the amending process again. Opponents argued that Congress, having by a two-thirds vote sent the amendment and its authorizing resolution to the states, had put the matter beyond changing by passage of a simple resolution, that states had either acted upon the entire package or at least that they had or could have acted affirmatively upon the promise of Congress that if the amendment had not been ratified within the prescribed period it would expire and their assent would not be compelled for longer than they had intended.

In 1981, the United States District Court for the District of Idaho, however, found that Congress did not have the authority to extend the deadline, even when only contained within the proposing joint resolution's resolving clause. The Supreme Court had decided to take up the case, bypassing the Court of Appeals, but before they could hear the case, the extended period granted by Congress had been exhausted without the necessary number of states, thus rendering the case moot.

== Constitutional clauses shielded from amendment ==
Article V also contains two statements that prohibit amending three clauses in Article I.

- The first prohibition is obsolete due to a sunset provision: two clauses of Section 9 were not amendable until 1808.
  - Clause 1, which prevented Congress from passing any law to restrict the importation of slaves prior to 1808, and
  - Clause 4, a declaration that direct taxes must be apportioned according to state populations, as described in Article I, Section 2, Clause 3.
- The second prohibition was not given an expiration date and remains in effect. It provides that no amendment shall deprive a state of its equal representation in the Senate, as described in Section 3, Clause 1, without that state's consent.

Designed to seal two compromises reached at the Constitutional Convention after contentious debates, these are the only entrenched provisions of the Constitution.

The guarantee of equal suffrage in the Senate is arguably subject to being amended through the procedures outlined within the article. Law professor George Mader holds that the shielding provision can be amended because it is not "self-entrenched", meaning that it does not contain a provision preventing its own amendment. Thus, under Mader's argument, a two-step amendment process could repeal the provision that prevents the equal suffrage provision from being amended and then repeal the equal suffrage provision itself. Mader contrasts the provision preventing the modification of the equal suffrage clause with the proposed Crittenden Compromise, which contains a self-entrenching, unamendable provision. Law professor Richard Albert agrees, contrasting the U.S. Constitution with other constitutions in which the provision that protects certain provisions from ever being amended also protects itself. Another legal scholar, Akhil Reed Amar, argues that such a two-step process is a "sly scheme".

== Exclusive means for amending the Constitution ==
According to constitutional theorist and scholar Lawrence G. Sager, there is debate among commentators about whether Article V is the exclusive means of amending the Constitution, or whether there are routes to amendment, including some routes in which the Constitution could be unconsciously or unwittingly amended in a period of sustained political activity on the part of a mobilized national constituency. For example, Akhil Amar rejects the notion that Article V excludes other modes of constitutional change, arguing instead that the procedure provided for in Article V is simply the exclusive method the government may use to amend the Constitution. He asserts that Article V nowhere prevents the people themselves, acting apart from ordinary government, from exercising their legal right to alter or abolish Government via the proper legal procedures.

Other scholars disagree. Some argue that the Constitution itself provides no mechanism for the American people to adopt constitutional amendments independently of Article V. US constitutional law professor Henry P. Monaghan has argued that Amar's Article V non-exclusivity stance is unsupported by history and precedent, makes Article V itself completely superfluous because no one would ever use Article V if a much easier "popular sovereignty" amendment track actually existed, and is incompatible with Amar's stance that the states and their people do not have an inherent right of secession from the United States. To elaborate, Monaghan has argued that Article V, and the US Constitution in general, was designed by the US Founding Fathers in such a way so that the American people will "reign but never rule". Meanwhile, Darren Patrick Guerra has argued that Article V is a vital part of the American constitutional tradition and he defends it against modern critiques that Article V is either too difficult, too undemocratic, or too formal. Instead he argues that Article V provides a clear and stable way of amending the document that is explicit, authentic, and the exclusive means of amendment; it promotes wisdom and justice through enhancing deliberation and prudence; and its process complements federalism and separation of powers that are key features of the Constitution. He argues that Article V remains the most clear and powerful way to register the sovereign desires of the American public with regard to alterations of their fundamental law. In the end, Article V is an essential bulwark to maintaining a written Constitution that secures the rights of the people against both elites and themselves.

The view that the Article V amendment process is the only legitimate vehicle for bringing about constitutional change is, as pointed out by constitutional law scholar Joel K. Goldstein, "challenged by numerous widely-accepted judicial decisions that have introduced new meaning into constitutional language by departing from original intentions, expectations, or meaning". He also points out how constitutional institutions have, independent of both judicial activity and alterations effected though the Article V process, evolved "to take forms inconsistent with what the Founders imagined or the language they wrote suggested".

In his farewell address, President George Washington said:

If in the opinion of the People the distribution or modification of the Constitutional powers be in any particular wrong, let it be corrected by an amendment in the way which the Constitution designates. But let there be no change by usurpation; for though this, in one instance, may be the instrument of good, it is the customary weapon by which free governments are destroyed. The precedent must always greatly overbalance in permanent evil any partial or transient benefit which the use can at any time yield.

This statement by Washington has become controversial, and scholars disagree about whether it still describes the proper constitutional order in the United States. Scholars who dismiss Washington's position often argue that the Constitution itself was adopted without following the procedures in the Articles of Confederation, while constitutional attorney Michael Farris disagrees, saying the convention was a product of the states' residual power, and the amendment in adoption process was legal, having received the unanimous assent of the states' legislatures.

== Amending Article V ==
Article V lays out the procedures for amending the Constitution, but it does not explicitly state whether those procedures apply to Article V itself. According to law professor George Mader, there have been numerous proposals to amend the Constitution's amending procedures, and "it is generally accepted that constitutional amending provisions can be used to amend themselves." Even so, Article V has never been amended.

== See also ==
- Democratic backsliding in the United States#Undemocratic institutions – for a critique of the U.S. Constitution's amendment process
- Gödel's loophole
- List of amendments to the United States Constitution
- List of proposed amendments to the United States Constitution
- List of state applications for an Article V Convention
- List of rescissions of Article V Convention applications
