= 51st state =

Proposals to admit a new state into the United States

A United States flag with 51 stars. According to the Flag Act of 1818, a new star must be added to the United States's flag for every new state admitted to the Union, and therefore a 51-state United States may have a flag similar or identical to the flag displayed above.

"51st state" is a phrase used in the United States to refer to the idea of adding an additional state to the current 50-state nation. Proposals for a 51st state may include granting statehood to one of the U.S. territories or Washington, D.C., splitting an existing state, or annexing part or all of a sovereign country. The U.S. has not admitted any new states to the union since 1959, when both Alaska (on January 3) and Hawaii (on August 21) were admitted. Before that, no states had been admitted since Arizona in February 1912. Before Alaska and Hawaii became U.S. states, the equivalent expression was "the 49th state". For example, the National Movement for the Establishment of a 49th State was a 1930s movement that sought to create a primarily Black state in the Southern United States.

In the 2000s, 2010s, and the 2020s, the term has been used most often in reference to active statehood movements in Washington, D.C., and in Puerto Rico, both voted for statehood in recent referendums: D.C. in 2016 and Puerto Rico in 2020. Their admission to the Union as states would require congressional approval. The two regions have different statuses within the U.S., with Puerto Rico as one of the five permanently inhabited U.S. territories, while D.C. has unique status as a federal administrative district. The path to statehood for Puerto Rico in particular would have parallels to the admission process of most U.S. states outside of the original Thirteen British Colonies, which started as territories before becoming states.

Since the 2024 U.S. presidential election, the phrase has also been frequently invoked in reference to Canada, as Donald Trump has used the phrase repeatedly while calling for the U.S. annexation of Canada. The U.S. annexed sovereign nations as states in the past, including Texas, Hawaii, and Vermont, though this has not happened in recent history. Some U.S. states have experienced movements to split into two states, often due to strong political disagreements between different regions of a state. There is precedent for such state-splitting moves in U.S. history, such as the creation of Kentucky and West Virginia from Virginia, though, again, there have been no such moves in more than a century. The phrase can also be used as a slang term in reference to regions or sovereign nations around the world that are not actually considered prospects for U.S. annexation, but are considered to be aligned with American culture or political or military interests. This slang may be used in either a positive sense, or in a pejorative sense (particularly towards Canada), similar to the term Americanization.

== Legal requirements ==
This 2022 Congressional Research Service report examines the legal processes for admission to the Union.

Article IV, Section 3, Clause 1 of the United States Constitution authorizes Congress to admit new states into the United States (beyond the 13 already in existence at the time the Constitution went into effect in 1788). Historically, most new states brought into being by Congress have been established from an organized incorporated territory, created and governed by Congress. In some cases, an entire territory became a state; in others, some part of a territory became a state. As defined in a 1953 U.S. Senate Committee on Interior and Insular Affairs, the traditionally accepted requirements for statehood are:

- The inhabitants of the proposed new state are imbued with and are sympathetic toward the principles of democracy as exemplified in the American Constitution.
- A majority of the electorate wish for statehood.
- The proposed new state has sufficient population and resources to support state government and carry its share of the cost of Federal Government.

Although not a legal rule, historically having at least 60,000 free adult males was also a requirement for statehood. This was outlined in the Northwest Ordinance decreed in 1787 when the United States was under the Articles of Confederation. Even though the United States no longer operates under this government, Congress has generally followed this guideline as states were added to the union. In most cases, the organized government of a territory made known the sentiment of its population in favor of statehood, usually by referendum. Congress then directed that government to organize a constitutional convention to write a state constitution. Upon acceptance of that constitution by the people of the territory and then by Congress, a joint resolution would be adopted granting statehood. The President would then issue a proclamation adding a new state to the Union. While Congress, which has ultimate authority over the admission of new states, has usually followed this procedure, there have been occasions (because of unique, case-specific circumstances) when it did not.

A simple majority in each House of Congress is required to pass statehood legislation; however, in the United States Senate, the filibuster requires 60 votes to invoke cloture. Some statehood advocacy organizations have called for amending or abolishing the filibuster as a path to achieve statehood. As with other legislation, the President can sign or veto statehood bills that pass, and Congress has the power to override a veto with a two-thirds majority; Nebraska is the only existing state admitted through a veto override. Although Congress, with approval of the President, can add a state to the Union, they cannot make another State by splitting or merging two existing states, without the consent of the State (or States) legislatures involved.

New States may be admitted by the Congress into this Union; but no new State shall be formed or erected within the Jurisdiction of any other State; nor any State be formed by the Junction of two or more States, or Parts of States, without the Consent of the Legislatures of the States concerned as well as of the Congress.

While states can join the United States, the 1869 Supreme Court case Texas v. White established that once they do so it is illegal to leave. This was a point of contention during the American Civil War (1861-1865).

== U.S. flag ==
If a new U.S. state were to be admitted, it would require a new design of the flag to accommodate an additional star for the 51st state. However, according to the U.S. Army Institute of Heraldry, an existing United States flag never becomes obsolete. In the event that a new state is added to the Union and a 51-star flag is approved, any previously approved American flag (such as the 48-star flag or 50-star flag) may continue to be used and displayed until no longer serviceable. On June 13, 2022, Washington, D.C. mayor Muriel Bowser ordered flags with 51 stars to be hung along Pennsylvania Avenue in support of D.C. being added as a 51st state.

United States flag variants with 51 stars or more
51 stars variant

51 stars variant

51 stars variant

52 stars variant

53 stars variant

54 stars variant

54 stars variant

54 stars variant

55 stars variant

55 stars variant

56 stars variant

57 stars variant

60 stars variant

== U.S. Senate classes ==
Should a 51st state be admitted, it would receive U.S. Senate seats in classes 1 and 2, at which point all three classes would have 34 senators.

== From existing territories of the United States ==
=== District of Columbia ===
Washington, D.C. in red between Virginia and Maryland

The District of Columbia is often mentioned as a candidate for statehood. In Federalist No. 43 of The Federalist Papers, James Madison considered the implications of the definition of the "seat of government" found in the United States Constitution. Although he noted potential conflicts of interest, and the need for a "municipal legislature for local purposes", Madison did not address the district's role in national voting. Legal scholars disagree on whether a simple act of Congress can admit the District as a state, due to its status as the seat of government of the United States, which Article I, Section 8 of the Constitution requires to be under the exclusive jurisdiction of Congress; depending on the interpretation of this text, admission of the full District as a state may require a Constitutional amendment, which is much more difficult to enact.

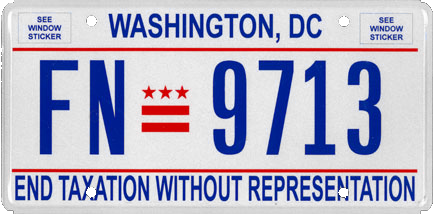
A 2017 license plate for Washington, D.C.

Flag of Washington, D.C.

The District of Columbia residents who support the statehood movement sometimes use the slogan "Taxation without representation" to denote their lack of Congressional representation. The phrase is a shortened version of the American Revolutionary War protest motto "no taxation without representation" omitting the initial "No", and is printed on newly issued District of Columbia license plates (although a driver may choose to have the District of Columbia website address instead). President Bill Clinton's presidential limousine had the "Taxation without representation" license plate late in his term, while President George W. Bush had the vehicle's plates changed shortly after beginning his term in office. President Barack Obama had the license plates changed back to the protest style shortly before his second-term inauguration. President Donald Trump eventually removed the license plate and signaled opposition to D.C. statehood.

This position was carried by the D.C. Statehood Party, a political party; it has since merged with the local Green Party affiliate to form the D.C. Statehood Green Party. The nearest this movement ever came to success was in 1978, when Congress passed the District of Columbia Voting Rights Amendment. Two years later in 1980, local citizens passed an initiative written and filed by J. Edward Guinan calling for a constitutional convention for a new state. In 1982, voters ratified the constitution of the state, which was to be called New Columbia. The drive for statehood stalled in 1985, however, when the District of Columbia Voting Rights Amendment failed because not enough states ratified the amendment within the allowed seven-year span.

Another proposed option would be to have Maryland, from which the D.C. land was ceded, retake the District of Columbia, as Virginia has already done for its part, while leaving the National Mall, the United States Capitol, the United States Supreme Court, and the White House in a truncated District of Columbia. This would give residents of the District of Columbia the benefit of statehood while precluding the creation of a 51st state, but would require the consent of the Government of Maryland. One major hurdle to this proposal is that it would not automatically repeal the 23rd amendment, and therefore the new federal enclave would still be entitled to three Electoral College votes. This would likely leave the First Family as the only permanent residents in the district, putting three Electoral votes in the hands of only the President and their family.

==== 2016 statehood referendum ====
District of Columbia statehood referendum, 2016
- November 8, 2016; 10 years ago
- Voting system: Simple majority

Shall the voters of the District of Columbia advise the Council to approve or reject this proposal?
Yes	85.83%
No	14.17%

On April 15, 2016, District Mayor Muriel Bowser called for a citywide vote on whether the nation's capital should become the 51st state. This was followed by the release of a proposed State Constitution. This Constitution would make the Mayor of the District of Columbia the Governor of the proposed state, while the members of the District Council would make up the proposed House of Delegates.

On November 8, 2016, the voters of the District of Columbia voted overwhelmingly in favor of statehood, with 86% of voters voting to advise approving the proposal. While the name "New Columbia" has long been associated with the movement, the City Council and community members chose the proposed state name to be the State of Columbia, or the State of Washington, Douglass Commonwealth. The Maryland abolitionist Frederick Douglass was a D.C. resident and was chosen to be the proposed state's namesake alongside George Washington of Virginia.

==== Federal exclave ====
To fulfill Constitutional requirements of having a Federal District and to provide the benefits of statehood to the 700,000-plus residents of D.C., in the proposed State of Washington, D.C., boundaries would be delineated between the State of Washington, D.C., and a much smaller federal seat of government. This would ensure federal control of federal buildings. The National Mall, the White House, the national memorials, Cabinet buildings, judicial buildings, legislative buildings, and other government-related buildings, etc. would be housed within the much smaller federal seat of government. All residences in the State of Washington, D.C. would reside outside the seat of federal government, except for the White House. The proposed boundaries are based on precedents created through the 1902 McMillan Plan with a few modifications. The rest of the boundaries would remain the same.

==== Admission legislation ====
On June 26, 2020, the United States House of Representatives voted 232–180 in favor of statehood for Washington, D.C. Passage of this legislation in the Senate was unlikely while the Republican Party held a Senate majority, and President Donald Trump also promised to veto D.C. statehood. The legislation, named H.R. 51, was in honor of D.C. potentially becoming the 51st state. After the 2020 Senate elections, the Democratic Party had a Senate majority, meaning Joe Biden's presidency might have opened the door for D.C. statehood. The vote was the first time D.C. ever had a vote for statehood pass any chamber of Congress: in 1993, D.C. statehood legislation was rejected in a US House floor vote by 153–277. Another problem is that because Maryland released the land to become D.C., it may have a claim on any land released by Congress to become a state.

On April 22, 2021, the United States House of Representatives voted 216–208 in favor of statehood for Washington, D.C. A similar bill, S. 51, "A bill to provide for the admission of the State of Washington, D.C. into the Union" was earlier introduced into the United States Senate. On April 30, Democratic senator Joe Manchin came out against both bills, effectively dooming their passage. (See 117th United States Congress) Senator Manchin said the way to make D.C. a State was by a constitutional amendment, which was the process for the voting rights with the 23rd Amendment. He went further, stating that the complications created by shrinking the Federal District to the National Mall with the 23rd Amendment should be addressed. While others disagreed, he thought that if it had been approved it would end up in the Supreme Court.

=== Puerto Rico ===
Flag of Puerto Rico

Puerto Rico has been discussed as a potential 51st state of the United States. In 2019, H.R. 1965 – Puerto Rico Admission Act, 5% of the lower legislature were in support. The bill was passed on to the House Committee on Natural Resources. In a 2012 status referendum a majority of voters, 54%, expressed dissatisfaction with the existing political relationship. In a separate question, 61% of voters supported statehood (excluding the 26% of voters who left this question blank). On December 11, 2012, Puerto Rico's legislature resolved to request that the President and the U.S. Congress act on the results, end its territorial status and begin the process of admitting Puerto Rico to the Union as a state. On January 4, 2017, Puerto Rico's new representative to Congress pushed a bill that would ratify statehood by 2025.

On June 11, 2017, another non-binding referendum was held where 97.7 percent voted for the statehood option. The turnout for this vote was 23 percent, a historical low as voter turnout in Puerto Rico usually hovers around 80%. The low turnout was attributed to a boycott led by the pro-status quo PPD party. On June 27, 2018, the Puerto Rico Admission Act of 2018 H.R. 6246 was introduced in the U.S. House with the purpose of responding to, and complying with, the democratic will of the United States citizens residing in Puerto Rico as expressed in the plebiscites held on November 6, 2012, and June 11, 2017, by setting forth the terms for the admission of the territory of Puerto Rico as a State of the Union. The admission act had 37 original cosponsors among Republicans and Democrats in the U.S. House of Representatives.

A subsequent nonbinding referendum was held on November 3, 2020, to decide whether Puerto Rico should become a state. Statehood won the vote 52.52%–47.48%. On December 15, 2022, H.R. 8393 (the Puerto Rico Status Act) passed the House of Representatives in a 233–191 vote with 11 absences. It would have instituted a binding referendum that would allow Puerto Ricans to vote on the future status of the island, that Congress would be required to obey. Every Democrat voted in favor of the bill, and was joined by 16 Republicans. The bill died in the Senate. The 2024 Puerto Rican status referendum was also a win for Statehood in the November 2024 election, which also saw a Pro-Statehood Governor of Puerto Rico elected. On February 15, 2025, the Puerto Rico House of Representatives approved a resolution on the legal status of Puerto Rico, the resolution, requests that "the President and Congress of the United States of America respond promptly and act in accordance with the demands of the citizens of Puerto Rico."

==== Background ====
Since 1898, Puerto Rico has had limited representation in the United States Congress in the form of a Resident Commissioner, a non-voting delegate. The 110th Congress returned the Commissioner's power to vote in the Committee of the Whole, but not on matters where the vote would represent a decisive participation. Puerto Rico has elections on the United States presidential primary or caucus of the Democratic Party and the Republican Party to select delegates to the respective parties' national conventions although presidential electors are not granted on the Electoral College. As American citizens, Puerto Ricans can vote in U.S. presidential elections, provided they reside in one of the 50 states or the District of Columbia and not in Puerto Rico itself. Residents of Puerto Rico pay U.S. federal taxes: import and export taxes, federal commodity taxes, social security taxes, thereby contributing to the American Government. Most Puerto Rico residents do not pay federal income tax but do pay federal payroll taxes (Social Security and Medicare). However, federal employees who do business with the federal government, Puerto Rico–based corporations that intend to send funds to the U.S., and others do pay federal income taxes. Puerto Ricans may enlist in the U.S. military. Puerto Ricans have participated in all American wars since 1898; 52 Puerto Ricans had been killed in the Iraq War and War in Afghanistan by November 2012.

Puerto Rico has been under U.S. sovereignty for over a century after it was ceded to the U.S. by Spain following the end of the Spanish–American War, and Puerto Ricans have been U.S. citizens since 1917. The island's ultimate status has not been determined, and its residents do not have voting representation in their federal government. Like the states, Puerto Rico has self-rule, a republican form of government organized pursuant to a constitution adopted by its people, and a bill of rights. This constitution was created when the U.S. Congress directed local government to organize a constitutional convention to write the Puerto Rico Constitution in 1951. The acceptance of that constitution by Puerto Rico's electorate, the U.S. Congress, and the U.S. president occurred in 1952. In addition, the rights, privileges and immunities attendant to United States citizens are "respected in Puerto Rico to the same extent as though Puerto Rico were a State of the Union" through the express extension of the Privileges and Immunities Clause of the U.S. Constitution by the U.S. Congress in 1948.

Puerto Rico is designated in its constitution as the "Commonwealth of Puerto Rico". The Constitution of Puerto Rico, which became effective in 1952, adopted the name of Estado Libre Asociado (literally translated as "Free Associated State"), officially translated into English as Commonwealth, for its body politic. The island is under the jurisdiction of the Territorial Clause of the U.S. Constitution, which has led to doubts about the finality of the Commonwealth status for Puerto Rico. In addition, all people born in Puerto Rico become citizens of the U.S. at birth (under provisions of the Jones–Shafroth Act in 1917), but citizens residing in Puerto Rico cannot vote for the President of the United States nor for full members of either house of Congress. Statehood would grant island residents full voting rights at the federal level and 2 state senators, like each US state has. In 1992, President George H. W. Bush issued a Memorandum to heads of Executive Departments and Agencies establishing the administrative relationship between the Federal Government and the Commonwealth of Puerto Rico. This memorandum directs all Federal departments, agencies, and officials to treat Puerto Rico administratively as if it were a State insofar as doing so would not disrupt Federal programs or operations. President Bush's memorandum remains in effect until Federal legislation is enacted to alter the status of Puerto Rico in accordance with the freely expressed wishes of the people of Puerto Rico. On April 29, 2010, the United States House of Representatives approved the Puerto Rico Democracy Act (H.R. 2499) by 223–169, but was not approved by the Senate before the end of the 111th Congress. It would have provided for a federally sanctioned self-determination process for the people of Puerto Rico. This act would provide for referendums to be held in Puerto Rico to determine the island's ultimate political status. It had previously been introduced in 2007.

==== Vote for statehood ====
Puerto Rican status referendum, 2012
- November 6, 2012; 14 years ago
- Voting system: Simple majority for the first question, first-past-the-post for the second question

Should Puerto Rico continue its current territorial status?
Yes	46.00%
No	54.00%

Which non-territorial option do you prefer?
Statehood	61.16%
Free association	33.34%
Independence	5.49%
There were 515,348 blank and invalidated ballots counted alongside the 1,363,854 ballots. Under Puerto Rico Law, these ballots are not considered cast votes and are therefore not reflected in the final tally.

In November 2012, a referendum resulted in 54 percent of respondents voting to reject its status under the territorial clause of the U.S. Constitution, while a second question resulted in 61 percent of voters identifying statehood as the preferred alternative to its territorial status. The 2012 referendum was by far the most successful referendum for statehood advocates and support for statehood rose in each successive popular referendum. However, more than one in four voters abstained from answering the question on the preferred alternative status. Statehood opponents have argued that the statehood option garnered 45 percent of the votes if abstentions are included. If abstentions are considered, the result of the referendum is much closer to 44 percent for statehood, a number that falls under the 50 percent majority mark.

The Washington Post, The New York Times and the Boston Herald have published opinion pieces expressing support for the statehood of Puerto Rico. On November 8, 2012, Washington, D.C. newspaper The Hill published an article saying that Congress will likely ignore the results of the referendum due to the circumstances behind the votes. U.S. Congressman Luis Gutiérrez and U.S. Congresswoman Nydia Velázquez, both of Puerto Rican ancestry, agreed with The Hill's statements. Shortly after the results were published, Puerto Rico-born U.S. Congressman José Enrique Serrano commented "I was particularly impressed with the outcome of the 'status' referendum in Puerto Rico. A majority of those voting signaled the desire to change the current territorial status. In a second question an even larger majority asked to become a state. This is an earthquake in Puerto Rican politics. It will demand the attention of Congress, and a definitive answer to the Puerto Rican request for change. This is a history-making moment where voters asked to move forward."

Several days after the referendum, the Resident Commissioner Pedro Pierluisi, Governor Luis Fortuño, and Governor-elect Alejandro García Padilla wrote separate letters to the President of the United States, Barack Obama, addressing the results of the voting. Pierluisi urged Obama to begin legislation in favor of the statehood of Puerto Rico, in light of its win in the referendum. Fortuño urged him to move the process forward. García Padilla asked him to reject the results because of their ambiguity. The White House position on the November 2012 plebiscite was that the results were clear, the people of Puerto Rico want the issue of status resolved, and a majority chose statehood in the second question. Former White House director of Hispanic media stated, "Now it is time for Congress to act and the administration will work with them on that effort, so that the people of Puerto Rico can determine their own future."

On May 15, 2013, Resident Commissioner Pierluisi introduced H.R. 2000 to Congress to "set forth the process for Puerto Rico to be admitted as a state of the Union", asking for Congress to vote on ratifying Puerto Rico as the 51st state. On February 12, 2014, Senator Martin Heinrich introduced a bill in the U.S. Senate. The bill would require a binding referendum to be held in Puerto Rico asking whether the territory wants to be admitted as a state. In the event of a yes vote, the president would be asked to submit legislation to Congress to admit Puerto Rico as a state.

==== Government funding for a fifth referendum ====
On January 15, 2014, the United States House of Representatives approved $2.5 million in funding to hold a referendum. This referendum can be held at any time as there is no deadline by which the funds have to be used. The United States Senate then passed the bill which was signed into law on January 17, 2014, by Barack Obama, then President of the United States.

==== 2017 referendum ====
Puerto Rican status referendum, 2017
- June 11, 2017; 9 years ago
- Voting system: Plurality

Results
Statehood	97.16%
Independence/Free Association	1.51%
Current Territorial Status	1.32%

The previous plebiscites had provided voters with three options: statehood, free association, and independence. The Puerto Rican status referendum of 2017 instead originally offered two options: statehood and independence/free association; however, a third option, "current territorial status" was later added. The referendum was held on June 11, 2017, with an overwhelming majority of voters supporting statehood at 97.16%; however, with a voter turnout of 22.99%, it was a historical low. Had the majority voted for independence/free association, a second vote would have been held to decide whether to have full independence as a nation, or to achieve associated free state status with independence but with a "free and voluntary political association" between Puerto Rico and the United States. The specifics of the association agreement would have been to be detailed in the Compact of Free Association that would have had to be negotiated between the U.S. and Puerto Rico. That document could have covered topics such as the role of the U.S. military in Puerto Rico, the use of the U.S. currency, free trade between the two entities, and whether Puerto Ricans would be U.S. citizens.

The governor, Ricardo Rosselló was strongly in favor of statehood to help develop the economy and help to "solve our 500-year-old colonial dilemma ... Colonialism is not an option ... It's a civil rights issue ... 3.5 million citizens seeking an absolute democracy". Benefits of statehood would include an additional $10 billion per year in federal funds, the right to vote in presidential elections, higher Social Security and Medicare benefits, and the right for its government agencies and municipalities to file for bankruptcy. At approximately the same time as the referendum, Puerto Rico's legislators were expected to vote on a bill that would allow the Governor to draft a state constitution and hold elections to choose senators and representatives to the United States Congress. Regardless of the outcome of the referendum or the bill on drafting a constitution, action by Congress would have still been necessary to implement changes to the status of Puerto Rico under the Territorial Clause of the United States Constitution.

If the majority of Puerto Ricans were to choose the Free Association option – and 33% voted for it in 2012 – and if it were granted by the U.S. Congress, Puerto Rico would become a Free Associated State, a virtually independent nation. It would have a political and economical treaty of association with the U.S. that would stipulate all delegated agreements. This could give Puerto Rico a similar status to Micronesia, the Marshall Islands, and Palau, countries which have a Compact of Free Association with the United States. Those Free Associated States use the American dollar, receive some financial support and the promise of military defense if they refuse military access to any other country. Their citizens are allowed to work in the U.S. and serve in its military. In total, 500,000 Puerto Ricans voted for statehood, 7,600 voted for independence, and 6,700 voted for status quo.

==== 2020 referendum ====
2020 Puerto Rican status referendum
- November 3, 2020; 6 years ago

"Should Puerto Rico be admitted immediately into the Union as a State?"
Yes (▲)	52.52%
No (⬤)	47.48%

A referendum of the status of Puerto Rico was held on November 3, 2020, concurrently with the general election. This was the sixth referendum held on the status of Puerto Rico, with the previous one having taken place in 2017. This was the first referendum with a simple yes-or-no question, with voters having the option of voting for or against becoming a U.S. state.

The referendum was non-binding, as the power to grant statehood lies with the US Congress. The party platforms of both the Republican Party and the Democratic Party have affirmed for decades Puerto Rico's right to self-determination and to be admitted as a state, at least in theory, but individual Republican legislators have been more skeptical. According to Senate Bill 1467, which placed the referendum on the ballot, voting "No" on the referendum would mean that a seven-member commission would be appointed to negotiate with the federal government for the free association or independence of Puerto Rico. Statehood won the referendum 52.52%–47.48%.

==== 2024 referendum ====
2024 Puerto Rican status referendum
- November 5, 2024; 2 years ago

Results
Statehood	58.61%
Sovereign free association	29.57%
Independence	11.82%
- Results by municipality Statehood: 60–70% 50–60% 40–50%

In 2024 another referendum was conducted, with three choices: Statehood, Independence, or Independence with Free Association. Statehood won with 58% of the vote in this referendum, though it did not include an option for status quo.

=== Guam ===
Flag of Guam

Guam is an unincorporated and organized territory of the United States. Located in the western Pacific Ocean, Guam is one of five American territories with a civilian government.

Guam is geographically a part of the Mariana Islands but Guam rejected unification with the Northern Mariana Islands in the past (at the time mostly due to tax issues; see 1969 Guamanian unification with the Northern Mariana Islands referendum); at the same time, referendums held in the Northern Marianas in 1958, 1961, 1963, and 1969 consistently demonstrated that the Northern Mariana Islanders supported unification with Guam. The Northern Marianas in later referendums chose to join the United States, which it did in 1986 as the Commonwealth of the Northern Mariana Islands, but like Guam, the Northern Mariana Islands has not reached statehood. In the 1980s and early 1990s, there was a significant movement in favor of Guam becoming a commonwealth, which would give it a level of self-government similar to Puerto Rico and the Northern Mariana Islands. However, the federal government rejected the version of commonwealth that the government of Guam proposed, because its clauses were incompatible with the Territorial Clause (Art. IV, Sec. 3, cl. 2) of the U.S. Constitution. Other movements advocate U.S. statehood for Guam, union with the state of Hawaii, union with the Northern Mariana Islands as a single territory, or independence.

Guam from space, 2010

In a 1982 vote, voters indicated interest in seeking commonwealth status. The island has been considering another non-binding vote on decolonization since 1998. Governor Eddie Baza Calvo intended to include one during the island's November 2016 elections but it was delayed again. A Commission on Decolonization was established in 1997 to educate the people of Guam about the various political status options in its relationship with the U.S.: statehood, free association and independence. The group was dormant for some years. In 2013, the commission began seeking funding to start a public education campaign. There were few subsequent developments until late 2016. In early December 2016, the Commission scheduled a series of education sessions in various villages about the status of Guam's relationship with the U.S. and the self-determination options that might be considered. The commission's executive director is Edward Alvarez and there are ten members. The group is also expected to release position papers on independence and statehood but they have not yet been completed.

Flag of the Northern Mariana Islands. Guam and the Northern Marianas chose to remain separate in 20th-century referendums, and both chose to be U.S. territories.

Guam was occupied for over 450 years by the Spanish and then the Japanese. Under the United States, the people have had several referendums to determine their fate, and the current status dates to a 1980s referendum which was won to continue as territory of the United States. Several late 20th referendums also determined they did not desire a unification with the Northern Marianas to the north, which joined the United States as territory in 1986. In 2016, Governor Eddie Calvo planned a decolonization referendum solely for the indigenous Chamorro people of Guam, in which the three options would be statehood, independence, and free association. However, this referendum for the Chamorro people was struck down by a federal judge on the grounds of racial discrimination. In the wake of this ruling, Governor Calvo suggested that two ballots be held: one for the Chamorro People and one for eligible U.S. citizens who are non-indigenous residents of Guam. A reunification referendum in Guam and its neighbor, the Northern Mariana Islands (a U.S. Commonwealth) has been proposed. A 2016 poll conducted by the University of Guam showed a majority supporting statehood when respondents were asked which political status they supported.

==== United Nations support ====
The United Nations is in favor of greater self-determination for Guam, though it has concluded its interest in the Northern Marianas which was removed from the list of non self-governing areas after it chose to join in the United States after a series of referendums in the 1960s and 1970s. The UN's Special Committee on Decolonization has agreed to endorse the governor's education plan. The commission's May 2016 report stated: "With academics from the University of Guam, [the Commission] was working to create and approve educational materials. The Office of the Governor was collaborating closely with the Commission" in developing educational materials for the public.

The United States Department of the Interior had approved a $300,000 grant for decolonization education, Edward Alvarez told the United Nations Pacific Regional Seminar in May 2016. "We are hopeful that this might indicate a shift in [United States] policy to its Non-Self-Governing Territories such as Guam, where they will be more willing to engage in discussions about our future and offer true support to help push us towards true self-governances and self-determination."

=== Other territories ===
Sequoyah constitutional referendum, 1905
- November 7, 1905; 121 years ago
- Voting system: Plurality

Shall the voters of the Indian Territory approve or reject this proposed constitution?
Approve	86.11%
Reject	13.88%

The Indian Territory attempted statehood in 1905, when citizens of the Five Civilized Tribes proposed creating the State of Sequoyah as a means to retain control of their lands and resources. A constitutional convention was held on August 21, 1905, in Muskogee, and the proposed constitution was overwhelmingly approved by the territory's indigenous and white residents. Congress did not support statehood for Sequoyah, and the Indian Territory was annexed into Oklahoma in 1907. The U.S. Virgin Islands explored the possibility of statehood in 1984 and in a 1993 referendum, while American Samoa explored the possibility of statehood in 2005 and 2017.

Flag of the United States Virgin Islands

Flag of American Samoa

== By status changes of former U.S. territories ==
=== Philippines ===
Location of the Philippines

The United States annexed the Philippines as its territory from the Spanish Empire in 1898 and established the Insular Government of the Philippine Islands in 1901. Since then, the Philippines has had small grassroots movements for U.S. statehood. Originally part of the platform of the Progressive Party, then known as the Federalista Party, the party dropped it in 1907, which coincided with the name change. Philippines became an independent nation in 1946. During the Philippine presidential elections of 1981, 4% of the electorate voted for Bartolome Cabangbang, a member of the Interim Batasang Pambansa from Bohol. He ran under the Federal Party which advocated for a plebiscite to convert the Philippines into the 51st US state.

As recently as 2004, the concept of the Philippines becoming a U.S. state has been part of a political platform in the Philippines. Supporters of this movement include Filipinos who believe that the quality of life in the Philippines would be higher and that there would be less poverty there if the Philippines were an American state or territory. Supporters also include Filipinos that had fought as members of the United States Armed Forces in various wars during the Commonwealth period. The Philippine statehood movement had a significant impact during its early period as an American territory. It is no longer a mainstream movement, but it is still a social movement that periodically gains interest and talk in the nation. No major politician in the Philippines has advocated for US statehood as of 2014. Election candidates in favor of the proposal have been declared as "nuisance candidates" by the Philippine government's election commission.

== By partition of or secession from U.S. states ==
There have historically been several proposals, with varying degrees of support, to divide states having regions that are politically or culturally divergent into smaller, more homogeneous, administratively efficient entities. Splitting a state requires the approval of both its legislature and the U.S. Congress.

Proposals of new states by partition include:

Flag of the Navajo Nation

- Arizona, New Mexico, and Utah:
  - Admitting into the Union the Navajo Nation, the largest Indian reservation in the United States. Reservations already enjoy a large degree of political autonomy, so making a state out of the Navajo Nation would not be as problematic as partitioning areas of other states. The Navajo Nation is larger than ten U.S. States. A Navajo state would help issues of representation, since as of 2023, four Representatives and one Senator were Native American.
  - The secession of Pima County in Arizona, with the hopes of neighboring counties Cochise, Yuma, and Santa Cruz joining to form a state.

Proposed flag of Jefferson

- California and Oregon:
  - The secession of Northern California and Southern Oregon to form a state named Jefferson. In 2021, 5 counties in Oregon voted to join Idaho.
  - Various proposals of partition and secession in California, usually splitting the south half from the north or the urban coastline from the rest of the state. In 2014, businessman Tim Draper collected signatures for a petition to split California into six different states, but not enough to qualify for the ballot. Draper attempted a follow-up petition to split California into three states in 2018. However, the initiative to divide California into three states was ordered removed from the 2018 ballot by the California Supreme Court, as the California constitution does not allow this type of ballot initiative.
- Colorado: In 2013, commissioners in Weld County, Colorado, proposed to leave Colorado along with neighboring counties of Morgan, Logan, Sedgwick, Phillips, Washington, Yuma, and Kit Carson to form the state of North Colorado. The counties in contention voted to begin plans for secession that November, with mixed results.
- Delaware, Maryland and Virginia:
  - The secession of several counties from the eastern shores of Maryland and Virginia, combining with some or all of the state of Delaware, forming a state named Delmarva.
  - The secession of five counties on the western side of Maryland due to political differences with the more liberal central part of the state.
- Florida: The secession of South Florida and the Greater Miami area to form a state named South Florida. The region has a population of over 7 million, comprising 41% of Florida's population.
- Illinois:
  - The secession of Cook County, which contains Chicago, to form a separate state, proposed by residents of the more conservative Downstate Illinois to free it from the political influence of the heavily liberal Chicago area.
  - The secession of Southern Illinois from the rest of the state, south of Springfield, with Mt. Vernon as the proposed capital.
  - The secession of sixteen counties in Western Illinois to form the state of Forgottonia, with its capital in the small hamlet of Fandon.
- Michigan: The secession of the geographically separate and culturally distinct Upper Peninsula of Michigan from the Lower Peninsula, as a state called Superior.
- Montana, South Dakota and Wyoming: The secession of various rural parts of the aforementioned states to form a new state called Absaroka, its capital would have been Sheridan, Wyoming.

An interpretation of a proposed flag of Long Island

- New York: Various proposals partitioning New York into separate states, most of which involve to some degree the separation of New York City from the rest of the state. There have also been proposals to separate Long Island into a state.
- Texas: Under the resolution by which the Republic of Texas was admitted to the Union and the state constitution, it has the right to divide itself into up to five states. There were a significant number of Texans who supported dividing the state in its early decades, called divisionists. Texas politics and self-image suggest that disrupting Texas' status as the largest state by land area in the contiguous United States is unlikely.

An interpretation of a proposed flag for Lincoln

- Washington: Dividing the state into Western Washington and Eastern Washington via the Cascade Mountains. Suggested names include East Washington, Lincoln, Cascadia, and more recently, Liberty. Territory for Lincoln would have also included part of Idaho.
- The National Movement for the Establishment of a 49th State, founded by Oscar Brown Sr. and Bradley Cyrus, and active in Chicago between 1934 and 1937, had the aim of forming an African-American state in the Southern United States.

== International use ==
Some countries, because of their cultural similarities and close alliances with the United States, or American egotism are sometimes described as a 51st state. In other countries around the world, movements with various degrees of support and seriousness have proposed U.S. statehood.

=== Canada ===
U.S. states and Canadian provinces and territories

In Canada, "the 51st state" is a phrase generally used to imply that if a certain political course is taken, Canada's destiny will be little more than a part of the United States. Examples include the Canada–United States Free Trade Agreement in 1988, the debate over the creation of a common defense perimeter, and the potential consequence of not adopting proposals intended to resolve the issue of Quebec sovereignty, the Charlottetown Accord in 1992 and the Clarity Act in 1999. The phrase is usually used in local political debates, in polemic writing or in private conversations. It is rarely used by politicians in public, although at certain times in Canadian history political parties have used other similarly loaded imagery. In the 1988 federal election, the Liberals asserted that the proposed Free Trade Agreement amounted to an American takeover of Canada – the party ran an ad in which Progressive Conservative (PC) strategists, upon the adoption of the agreement, slowly erased the Canada-U.S. border from a desktop map of North America. Within days, however, the PCs responded with an ad which featured the border being drawn back on with a permanent marker.

The implication has historical basis and dates to the breakup of British America during the American Revolution. The colonies that had confederated to form the United States, invaded Canada (then a term referring specifically to Upper Canada and Lower Canada, now the modern-day provinces of Quebec and Ontario, which had both been in British hands since 1763) several times, specifically the invasion of Quebec in 1775 and 1778–1782. The first invasion occurred in 1775–1776 mainly across the Canadian side of the Lake Champlain and St. Lawrence River valleys, under the assumption that French-speaking Canadians' presumed hostility towards British colonial rule combined with the Franco-American alliance would make them natural allies to the American cause; the Continental Army successfully recruited two Canadian regiments for the invasion. That invasion's failure forced the members of those regiments into exile, and they settled mostly in upstate New York. However, the Continental Army was more successful in the Western theater in lands north of the Ohio Valley and south of the Great Lakes region, both of which were part of Canada. The Articles of Confederation, written during the Revolution, included a provision for Canada to join the United States, should they ever decide to do so, without needing to seek U.S. permission as other states would. Nova Scotia (which at the time also included the territory now belonging to New Brunswick), a more established British colony that was at the time adjacent to the other 13, considered joining the revolution but never joined the Continental Congress and, by the late 1770s, successfully placated or suppressed any Patriot sympathies and had firmly decided to remain loyal to the Crown. What is now Prince Edward Island (then Saint John's Island) was successfully captured by Continental militias, but George Washington ordered the island's return, stating that he wanted colonies to join willingly, not be forcibly captured.

At the end of the Revolution, the U.S. took portions of Canadian territory of what is now present day Illinois, Indiana, Michigan, Ohio, Wisconsin, and parts of Minnesota in accordance to the Treaty of Paris in 1783. The U.S. again invaded Canada during the War of 1812, but this effort was made more difficult due to the wide use of ill-equipped state militias and owing to the large number of Loyalists that had fled to what is now Ontario and still resisted joining the republic. The Hunter Patriots in the 1830s and the Fenian raids after the American Civil War were private attacks on Canada from the U.S. Several U.S. politicians in the 19th century also spoke in favor of annexing Canada, as did Canadian politician William Lyon Mackenzie, who set up a rogue Republic of Canada on a small island near the U.S. border during the Upper Canada Rebellion. In the United States, the term "the 51st state" when applied to Canada is used disparagingly, intended to deride Canada as an inconsequential neighbor.

==== Proposals to annex Canada by Donald Trump ====
Trump's Mar-a-Lago comments involve territorial changes including Canada, Greenland, and Panama. Causing widespread international discussions, he seemed to suggest Canada would enter as at least two states 51 and 52, with the status of Greenland and Panama unclear. Canada has 10 provinces and three territories. The United States has 50 states and 5 inhabited territories. Greenland is a division of Denmark.

In December 2024, then-President-elect Donald Trump suggested Canada consider becoming the 51st U.S. state, during talks with then-Prime Minister Justin Trudeau over proposed tariffs and border security at Mar-a-Lago. He later referred to Trudeau as "Governor Justin Trudeau of the Great State of Canada". This was initially taken as a joke, with Ontario Premier Doug Ford joking on Fox News that this was Trump's attempt at revenge for the War of 1812.

Trump continued to refer to Trudeau as "Governor", even after he resigned from office, and repeatedly declared his desire for Canadian annexation throughout his first 100 days in office, including while proposing major tariffs on the Canadian economy. He quipped that NHL legend Wayne Gretzky should run to become the Governor of an annexed Canada.

Trump's comments reignited pre-existing discourse on U.S.-Canadian union. Canadian author Don Tapscott was among those who considered the logistics of a full merger, in which Canada would need to be composed of 13 states or territories. (Trump had suggested that Canada would enter the Union as just two states, one more conservative, one more liberal.) Effects would include Ontario becoming the fifth largest state in the US with 16 million residents, a potential absorption of Canadian healthcare into the U.S. system, and regional differences for Canadian programs including women's healthcare, paid parental leave for men and women, gun control, campaign finance, standardized education funding, and a more pro-refugee immigration stance.

==== Opinion polling ====
===== Canadian polling =====
Since Donald Trump's comments on his support of annexing Canada, there have been a number of opinion polls conducted asking Canadians on their opinion of the proposal. The responses from Canadians have been overwhelmingly against Canada joining the United States as the 51st state.

Polls asking Canadian Citizens
Should Canada join the United States of America as the 51st state
Date	Pollster/Company	Yes	No	Unsure
24 Mar 2025	Léger	9%	85%	5%
3 Mar 2025	Léger	9%	85%	6%
17 Jan 2025	Abacus Data	22%	71%	8%
16 Jan 2025	Ipsos	20%	80%	—N/a
14 Jan 2025	Angus Reid	10%	90%	—N/a
10 Dec 2024	Léger	13%	82%	5%

===== American polling =====
Some polls have also been conducted asking American opinions on Canada being annexed as the 51st state. An Angus Reid poll reported 49% of Americans opposing the proposal and 25% supporting it, with 26% being unsure.

==== Western Canada ====
Western provinces

In 1980 two members of the Legislative Assembly of Saskatchewan, both elected as members of the Progressive Conservative Party of Saskatchewan (and one, Dick Collver, its former leader), crossed the floor to form the Unionest Party, a provincial party in Saskatchewan which advocated that the four provinces of Western Canada should join the United States. The name was a contraction of "best union." The party soon folded.

===== Alberta =====
Proposed State of Alberta

Albertan secessionist flag with the addition of a lone star

Albertan seal promoted by Annexationists

One example of a Canadian annexation movement is in the province of Alberta. In the 21st century, an Alberta51 separatist project was founded and gained some media attention. Peter Zeihan argued in his book The Accidental Superpower that the Canadian province of Alberta would benefit from joining the United States as the 51st state. There is growing support for Alberta separatism resulting from federal government policies which are believed to be harming the province's ability to build pipelines for the province's oil and gas industry and federal equalization payments. In a September 2018 poll, 25% of Albertans believed they would be better off separating from Canada and 62% believed they are not getting enough from confederation. Ever since Trump's proposal on annexing Canada in 2024, interest within the Albertan annexationist movement has drawn increased attention within Alberta's political landscape. In 2025, the Republican Party of Alberta was formed modeled after the US American Republican Party.

==== Newfoundland ====
In the late 1940s, during the last days of the Dominion of Newfoundland (at the time a separate dominion in the British Empire and independent of Canada), there was mainstream support, although not majority, for Newfoundland to form an economic union with the United States, thanks to the efforts of the Economic Union Party and significant U.S. investment in Newfoundland stemming from the U.S.-British alliance in World War II. The movement ultimately failed when, in a 1948 referendum, voters narrowly chose to confederate with Canada (the Economic Union Party supported an independent "responsible government" that they would then push toward their goals).

==== Quebec ====
In the 1989 Quebec general election, the political party Parti 51 ran 11 candidates on a platform of Quebec seceding from Canada to join the United States (with its leader, André Perron, claiming Quebec could not survive as an independent nation). The party attracted just 3,846 votes across the province, 0.11% of the total votes cast. In comparison, the principal party in favor of Quebec sovereignty in that election, the Parti Québécois, got 40.16%. The party ran again in the 2018 getting 1,117 (0.03) and in 2022 getting 689 (0.02). The party dissolved in 2024.

=== Mexico ===
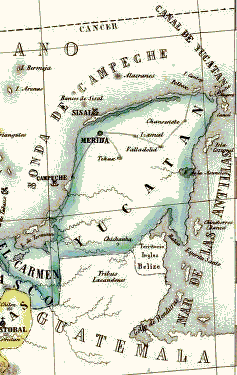
Yucatán tried to join the US in the 1840s.

In 1847–1848, with the United States' resounding defeat of Mexico and the occupying at the conclusion of the Mexican–American War, there was talk in Congress of annexing the entirety of Mexico. The result was the Mexican Cession through the Treaty of Guadalupe Hidalgo, named for the town in which the treaty was signed, in which the U.S. annexed almost 31% of Mexico. The Mexican Cession consisted of territory that became the states of California, Nevada, Utah, most of Arizona, the western half of New Mexico, the western quarter of Colorado, and the southwest corner of Wyoming. Later in 1854, the United States made the Gadsden Purchase official. In 1848, a bill was debated in Congress that would have annexed the Republic of Yucatán, but there was no vote.

=== Central America ===
Due to geographical proximity of the Central American countries to the U.S., with its powerful military, economic, and political influences, there were several movements and proposals by the United States during the 19th and 20th centuries to annex some or all of the Central American republics (Costa Rica, El Salvador, Guatemala, Honduras with the formerly British-ruled Bay Islands, Nicaragua, Panama which had the U.S.-ruled Canal Zone territory from 1903 to 1979, and Belize, which is a constitutional monarchy and was known as British Honduras until 1973). However, the U.S. never acted on these proposals from some U.S. politicians; some of which were never delivered or considered seriously. In 2001, El Salvador adopted the U.S. dollar as its currency, while Panama has used it for decades due to its ties to the Canal Zone.

=== Cuba ===
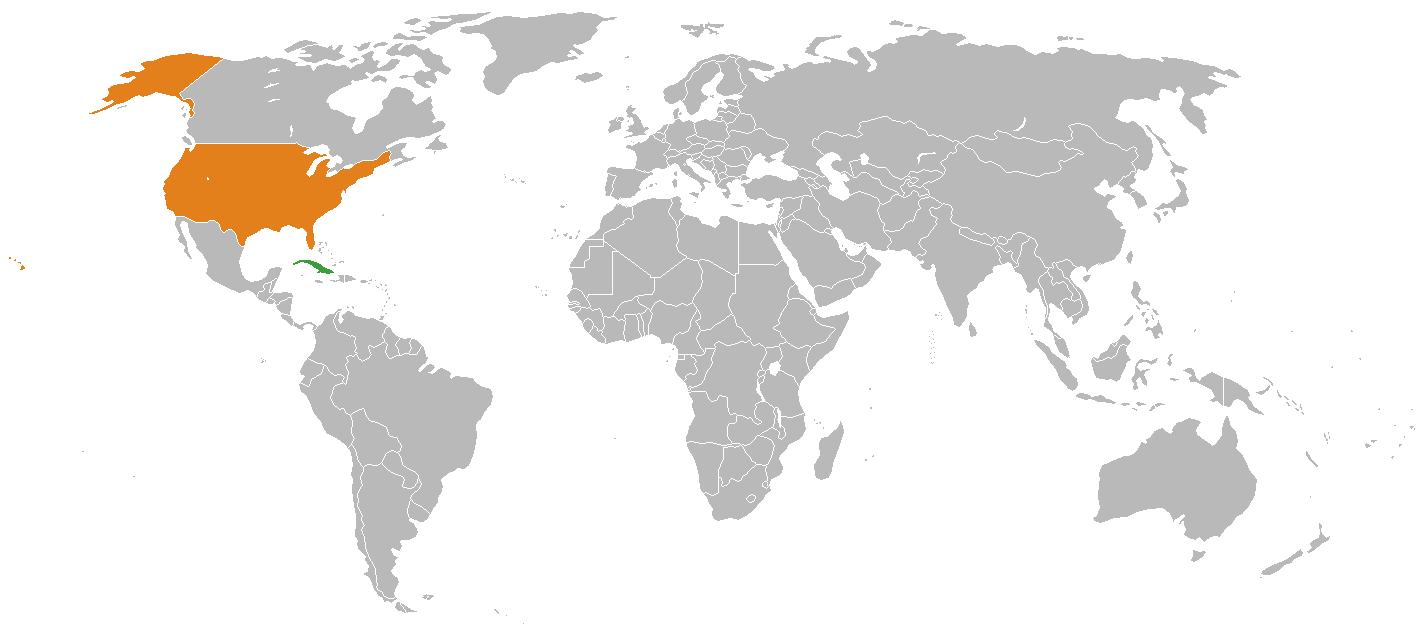
Cuba (green) and the United States (orange)

In 1854, the Ostend Manifesto outlined a rationale for the U.S. to purchase Cuba from Spain, implying that it might take the island by force if Spain refused. Once the document was published, many Northern states denounced it. In 1859, Senator John Slidell introduced a bill to purchase Cuba from Spain.

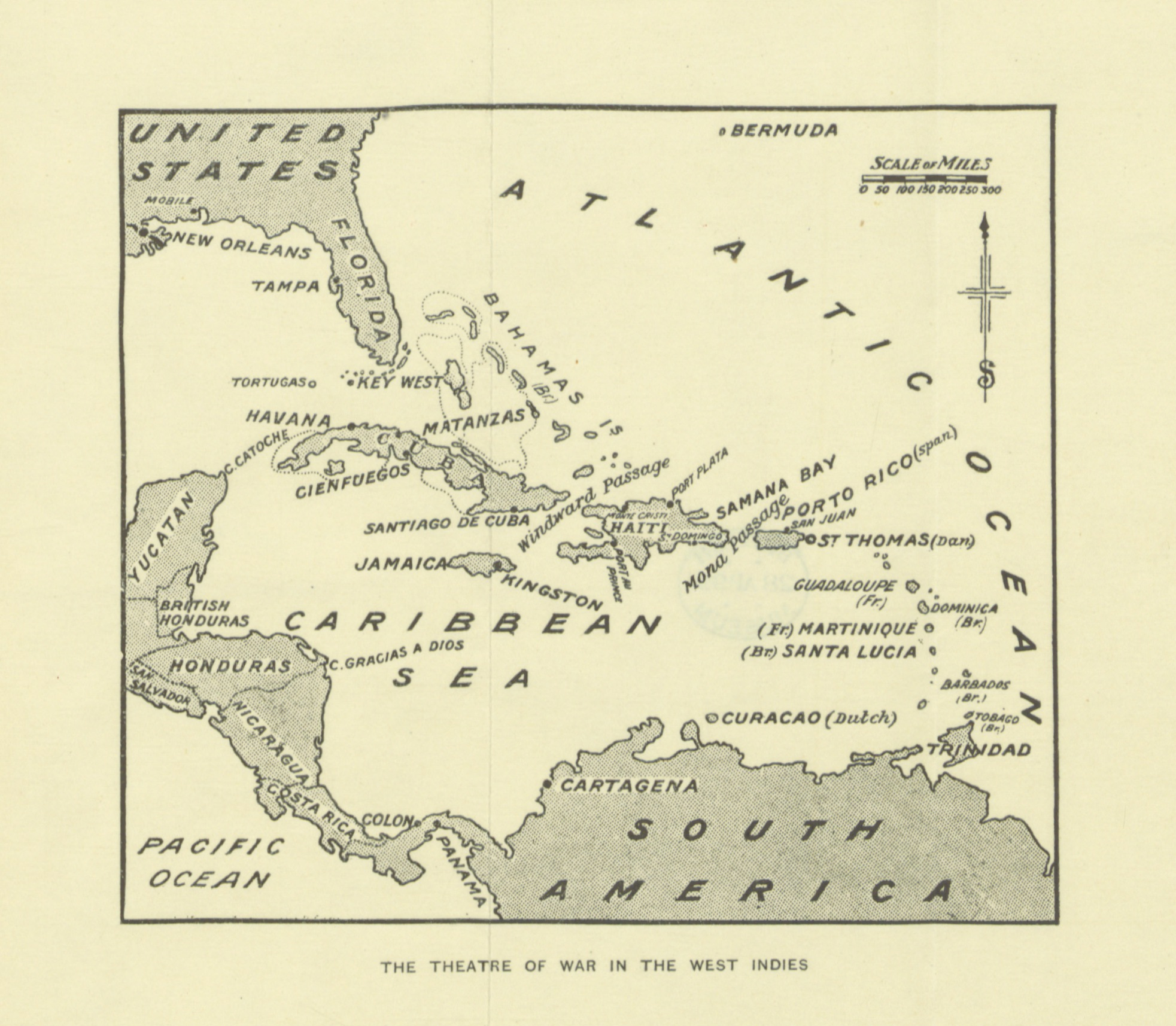
The Spanish-American war of 1898 led to Cuba's independence.

Cuba, like many Spanish territories, wanted to break free from Spain. A pro-independence movement in Cuba was supported by the U.S., and Cuban guerrilla leaders wanted annexation to the United States, but Cuban revolutionary leader José Martí called for Cuban nationhood. When the U.S. battleship Maine sank in Havana Harbor, the U.S. blamed Spain and the Spanish–American War broke out in 1898. After the U.S. won, Spain relinquished its claim of sovereignty over most of its remaining territories, including Cuba. The U.S. administered Cuba as a protectorate until 1902.

=== Dominica ===
In 1898, one news outlet in the Caribbean noted growing sentiments of resentment of British rule in Dominica, including its system of administration. The publication attempted to gauge sentiments concerning annexation to the United States as a way to change this system of administration.

=== Dominican Republic ===
On June 30, 1870, the United States Senate voted against an annexation treaty with the Dominican Republic.

=== Greenland ===
A map showing the locations of the United States (orange) and Greenland (green)

During World War II, when Denmark was occupied by Nazi Germany, the United States briefly controlled Greenland for battlefields and protection, since the nation was in a strategic position. In 1946, the United States offered to buy Greenland from Denmark for US$100,000,000 (US$1,600,000,000 as of 2024) but Denmark refused to sell. Some have, in recent years, argued that Greenland would hypothetically be better off financially as part of the United States; for instance this was mentioned by Professor Gudmundur Alfredsson at the University of Akureyri, Iceland, in 2014. The Trump administration in both administrations have both expressed interest in Greenland, as per American expansionist policies. One possible reason for U.S. interest in Greenland is its vast natural resources. According to The Arctic Institute, the U.S. appears to be highly interested in investing in the resources of the island and in tapping the expected vast amount of hydrocarbons off the Greenlandic coast, as well as for national defence on the development of a missile defence system for the U.S.

=== Haiti ===
Time columnist Mark Thompson suggested that Haiti had effectively become the 51st state after the 2010 Haiti earthquake, with the widespread destruction prompting a quick and extensive response from the United States, even so far as stationing of the U.S. military in Haitian air and seaports to facilitate foreign aid.

=== Guyana ===
Flag of the Guyana, USA movement. It is based on the design of the current flag of Guyana, with the red-white-blue color scheme of the U.S. flag. The star was added in 2019.

Former flag of the Guyana, USA movement, prior to the addition of the star

In Guyana, there is a fringe group named "Guyana, USA", which seeks for the incorporation of the country into the United States, whether as a new state or territory.

=== Albania ===
Albania has been called the 51st state for its perceived strongly pro-American positions, and the United States' policies towards it. In reference to President George W. Bush's 2007 European tour, Edi Rama, Tirana's mayor and leader of the opposition Socialists, said: "Albania is for sure the most pro-American country in Europe, maybe even in the world ... Nowhere else can you find such respect and hospitality for the President of the United States. Even in Michigan, he wouldn't be as welcome." At the time of ex-Secretary of State James Baker's visit in 1992, there was a move to hold a referendum declaring the country as the 51st American state.

=== Kosovo ===
Kosovo (which is predominately Albanian) has been considered as a 51st state due to the heavy presence and influence of the United States. The U.S. has had troops and the largest base outside U.S. territory, Camp Bondsteel, in the territory since 1999.

=== Cartagena (Spain) ===
In 1873, the leader of the Canton of Cartagena, Roque Barcia, requested that Cartagena become part of the United States in a letter to President Ulysses S. Grant. The Canton of Cartagena had emerged in the same year as a revolt against the First Spanish Republic. The United States Government never replied.

=== Denmark ===
In 1989, the Los Angeles Times published that Denmark becomes the 51st state every Fourth of July, because Danish citizens in and around Aalborg celebrate the American Independence Day in a small gathering called the Rebild Festival.

=== Poland ===
Poland has historically been staunchly pro-American, dating to General Tadeusz Kościuszko and Casimir Pulaski's support of the American Revolution. This pro-American stance was reinforced following favorable American intervention in World War I (leading to the creation of an independent Poland) and the Cold War (culminating in a Polish state independent of Soviet influence). Poland contributed a large force to the "Coalition of the Willing" in Iraq. A quote referring to Poland as "the 51st state" has been attributed to James Pavitt, then Central Intelligence Agency Deputy Director for Operations, especially in connection to extraordinary rendition. Currently, Poland ranks as the nation with the most favorable view of the United States among countries surveyed internationally, with more than 85% of Poles expressing positive views toward America as of 2024.

=== Italy ===
The Italian Unionist Movement was a political party briefly active during and after World War II, with the goal of an annexation of Italy to the United States.

==== Sicily ====
In Sicily, the Party of Reconstruction was one of several Sicilian nationalist and separatist movements active after the downfall of Italian Fascism. Sicilians felt neglected or underrepresented by the Italian government after the annexation of 1861 that ended the rule of the Kingdom of the Two Sicilies based in Naples. It claimed 40,000 members in 1944, and campaigned for Sicily to be admitted as a U.S. state.

=== United Kingdom ===
Location of the United Kingdom

The United Kingdom has sometimes been called "the 51st state" due to the Special Relationship in United Kingdom–United States relations, particularly since the close cooperation between Franklin D. Roosevelt and Winston Churchill during World War II, and more recently (As of 2008) during the premierships of Margaret Thatcher and Tony Blair. In the 1960s, prior to the accession of the United Kingdom to the European Economic Community (as it was then), Prime Minister Harold Wilson reportedly held informal discussions with US President Lyndon Johnson about the possibility of the UK becoming America's 51st state.

In an April 5, 1999 article in Forbes, historian Paul Johnson proposed that, as an alternative to the European Union, the UK should become ten states (one each for Northern Ireland, Scotland, and Wales, with England divided into seven). He went on to suggest that then Canada (as one state per province), Australia, and New Zealand should also join this expanded United States.

In a 2011 column in The Times, journalist David Aaronovitch joked that the UK should consider joining the United States as its 51st state, because Euroscepticism in the United Kingdom and Brexit would otherwise lead to terminal decline. He also made an alternative case that England, Scotland, and Wales should be three separate states, with Northern Ireland joining the Republic of Ireland and becoming an all-Ireland state. The UK band New Model Army released the song "51st State" in 1986. The lyrics facetiously refer to the "Star Spangled Union Jack" and describes the UK as culturally and politically dominated by the United States. The song "Heartland" by The The from the same year ends with the refrain "This is the 51st state of the U.S.A."

=== Ukraine ===
During the Russian invasion of Ukraine, Republican then-congresswoman Marjorie Taylor Greene controversially referred to Ukrainian president Volodymyr Zelenskyy as a "shadow president (of the United States)", remarking that Ukraine was also the "51st state" due to the "insane amount" of American support for Ukraine in the war.

=== Australia ===
In Australia, the term '51st state' is used to disparage the perceived invasion of American cultural or political influence. Australia's involvement in the U.S.-led invasion of Iraq led to some commentators asserting Australia was the '51st state'.In 2004, former Prime Minister Malcolm Fraser accused U.S. President George W. Bush of "treating Australia like the 51st state" after Bush criticized Mark Latham's proposal to withdraw Australian troops from Iraq.

In August 2024, former Prime Minister Paul Keating accused the Labor Albanese government of turning Australia into a '51st state' or 'US protectorate' by maintaining the AUKUS military alliance with the United States.

=== New Zealand ===
In 2010, there was an attempt to register a 51st State Party with the New Zealand Electoral Commission. The party advocates New Zealand becoming the 51st state of the United States of America. The party's secretary is Paulus Telfer, a former Christchurch mayoral candidate. On February 5, 2010, the party applied to register a logo with the Electoral Commission. The logo – a U.S. flag with 51 stars – was rejected by the Electoral Commission on the grounds that it was likely to cause confusion or mislead electors.

=== Okinawa (Japan) ===
In Article 3 of the Treaty of San Francisco between the Allied Powers and Japan, which came into force in April 1952, the U.S. put the outlying islands of the Ryukyus, including the island of Okinawa (home to over one million Okinawans, an ethnically distinct people speaking Ryukyuan languages related to the Japanese language), the Bonin Islands, and the Volcano Islands (including Iwo Jima) into U.S. trusteeship. All these trusteeships were slowly returned to Japanese rule. Okinawa was returned on May 15, 1972, but the U.S. stations troops in the island's bases as a defense for Japan. The continued military presence has been described as a 51st state.

=== Israel and Palestine ===
Several sources assert that Israel functions as a 51st state due to the annual funding, defense and overall support it receives from the United States. An example of this is the 2003 book by Martine Rothblatt called Two Stars for Peace that argued for the addition of Israel and Palestine as the 51st and 52nd states of the Union. The American State of Canaan is a book by political scientist and sociologist Alfred de Grazia from March 2009, proposing the creation of the "State of Canaan" from Israel and Palestine.

=== Iran ===
According to Iran's former IRGC Commander-in-Chief Salami, before the 1979 Iranian revolution, Iran was practically the 51st state of the United States. In 1978, Jimmy Carter traveled to Iran where he famously stated that Iran has become "an island of stability in one of the more troubled areas of the world", even saying that Iran was the country most important for American national interests and when he entered Iran, he felt like it was America's "54th state".

=== Iraq ===
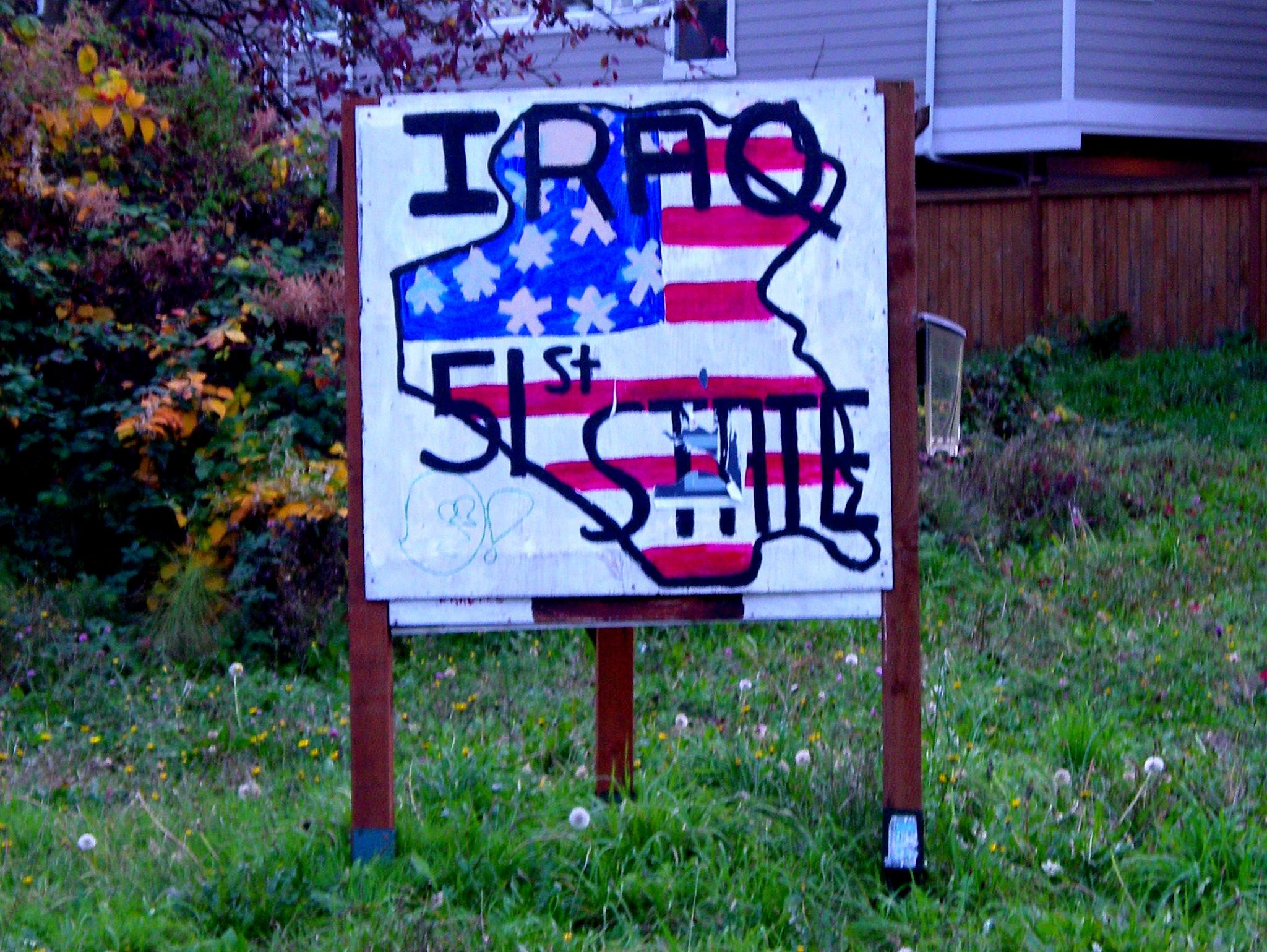
A resident of Seattle, Washington, through a homemade sign, facetiously declares that the Republic of Iraq is the 51st U.S. state.

Several publications suggested that the 2003 invasion of Iraq was a neocolonialist war to make Iraq into the 51st U.S. state, though such statements are usually made facetiously.

=== Taiwan ===
A poll in 2003 among Taiwanese residents aged between 13 and 22 found that, when given the options of either becoming a province of the People's Republic of China or a state within the U.S., 55% of the respondents preferred statehood while 36% chose joining China (note: 9% gave no opinion; the sampling error at a 95% confidence level is ±3.1 pp). A group called Taiwan Civil Government, established in Taipei in 2008, claims that the island of Taiwan and other minor islands are a territory of the United States.

=== Hong Kong ===
The idea of admission to the United States was discussed among some netizens based on Hong Kong's mature common law system, long tradition of liberalism and vibrant civil society making it a global financial hub similar to London or New York. Alongside proposals of becoming independent (within or outside the Commonwealth, as a republic or a Commonwealth realm), rejoining the Commonwealth, confederation with Canada as the eleventh province or the fourth territory (with reference to Ken McGoogan's proposal regarding Scotland), returning to British rule as a dependent territory, joining Taiwan (Republic of China) or acceding to other federations as a city-state.

=== Iceland ===
In January 2026, U.S. nominee ambassador to Iceland Billy Long joked that Iceland would become the "52nd state" after Greenland.

=== Liberia ===
The flag of Liberia, which resembles the stars and stripes of the Flag of the United States

Location of Liberia in Africa

There are no African countries historically tied to the United States more closely than Liberia. Established by the American Colonization Society in 1822 as a home for freed Black Americans, Liberia's capital, Monrovia, was named after James Monroe, the fifth U.S. president. Liberia has sometimes been regarded as a "mini-America" on the West African coast because its people speak English, use U.S. customary units, have modeled the flag after the Stars and Stripes and even created a U.S.-style constitution. Many Liberians regard the U.S. as their "mother country". "We are the 51st state," said Herbert Walker, a Liberian street merchant. "We sang your national anthem and learned American history. We love American dollars."

=== Honduras ===
During the 2025 Honduran general election, the presidential candidate Mario "Chano" Riveras (Christian Democratic Party) proposed to annex Honduras to the United States. The motto of his campaign is "Join the gringos".

=== Venezuela ===
On March 16, 2026, following the victory of Venezuela over Italy in the semifinals of the 2026 World Baseball Classic, U.S. president Donald Trump posted a message on Truth Social stating that “good things are happening to Venezuela” and suggesting that the country could become the 51st state of the United States. The remark was widely interpreted as a reference to the recent capture of Nicolás Maduro by United States forces earlier that year.

The following day, after Venezuela defeated the United States in the championship game, Trump again posted on Truth Social, writing simply “Statehood,” in apparent reference to the same idea.

On 12 May of the same year, Trump posted an image on his official Truth Social account depicting a map of Venezuela filled with the flag of the United States and the caption “51st State”. Minutes later, the official White House account on X published a video featuring U.S. Secretary of State Marco Rubio paraphrasing rapper The Notorious B.I.G. with the phrase “If you don’t know, now you know”, while his music played in the background following the announcement of the capture of Nicolás Maduro. The video then showed the widely circulated image of Maduro aboard an aircraft en route to New York after his capture, before ending with Rubio wearing the same grey Nike tracksuit Maduro had worn at the time of his arrest.

== See also ==
- 51st State (song)
- Associated state
- Hawaii Admission Act, the last law to admit a new US state (1959)
- List of state partition proposals in the United States
- List of U.S. states by date of admission to the Union
- Manifest destiny
- Mexifornia
- North American Union
- Reconquista (Mexico)
- Territories of the United States
- United Nations list of non-self-governing territories
- American imperialism
