= Texas House Bill 3817 =

Proposed Texas law

Texas Legislature
- Long title: Relating to the criminal offense of gender identity fraud.
- Territorial extent: Texas
- Considered by: Texas House of Representatives

Legislative history
- Bill title: House Bill 3817
- Introduced by: Tom Oliverson
- Introduced: March 5, 2025
- First reading: March 26, 2025

Summary
- Considers "gender identity fraud," or knowingly claiming to be a gender that does not align with biological sex, as a felony.
- Status: Expired

Texas House Bill 3817 (HB 3817) was a proposed law in the state of Texas that would have made it a felony to commit "gender identity fraud," effectively criminalizing being transgender. It was introduced by Representative Tom Oliverson on March 5, 2025, but expired on May 16, 2025, after reaching the deadline.

The bill garnered criticism for being anti-transgender and extreme. The bill never made it to an official vote despite committee hearings and had few co-sponsors.

== Provisions ==
House Bill 3817 would criminalize "gender identity fraud" by making it a felony for Texans to present their gender as something that does not align with their biological sex, especially in regard to government agencies or employers. Those who commit said felony could have been given a $10,000 fine or sentenced to two to ten years in jail, or both. It applied to verbal or written statements.

== See also ==
- LGBTQ rights in Texas
