= African-American self-determination =

Since the 19th century there have been efforts to secure self-determination for African-Americans. Such efforts often intersect with the historic Back-to-Africa movement and general Black separatism, but also manifest in present and historic demands for self-determination on North American soil, ranging from autonomy to independence. The freedom to make whatever choices as a free American, and willfulness to do for self are often a key demand for advocates of African-American self-determination. In the 19th century, Edwin P. McCabe promoted the idea of making Oklahoma into a Black-majority state. In the 20th century, the idea of an independent African-American state in the Black Belt was taken up by the international communist movement and the Communist Party USA, and later by anti-revisionist groups in the New Communist movement. Harry Haywood was a prominent Black communist advocate of this position. In the 1930s, Oscar Brown, Sr.'s National Movement for the Establishment of a 49th State was also active. Within the Black nationalist tradition, the Republic of New Afrika was formed in 1968 with the goal of achieving an independent state and has persisted into the present day.

== As U.S. state ==
=== Edwin P. McCabe in Oklahoma ===
Former Kansas State Auditor Edwin P. McCabe joined the migration of thousands of African-Americans to the Oklahoma Territory in 1890, and then promoted African-American migration to the territory. By 1892, from the city of Langston, he geared his promotion toward the goal of a Black-majority state that would eventually send two African-American senators to Congress in Washington, D.C., and to guarantee a black majority in every congressional district of the new state. He helped populate at least twenty-five new black-majority towns in the territory to the goal of Black-majority statehood, even as white racial sentiments soured against African-Americans in the territory enough to implement segregation in the territory's laws by the time Oklahoma Territory was merged with the Indian Territory to become the state of Oklahoma in 1907. In the end, neither a black majority nor McCabe's dreams of a governorship over a Black-majority state were realized.

=== Oscar Brown Sr. ===
The National Movement for the Establishment of a 49th State was established by Chicago-based businessman Oscar Brown, Sr., who sought for the formation of a state within the union on U.S. soil which could be populated and governed by African-Americans, and which could apportion the benefits of the New Deal more equitably to African-Americans. Eventually, the organization fizzled out before the eventual 49th state, Alaska, was admitted to the Union in 1959.

== American communist support ==
=== During the Soviet period ===
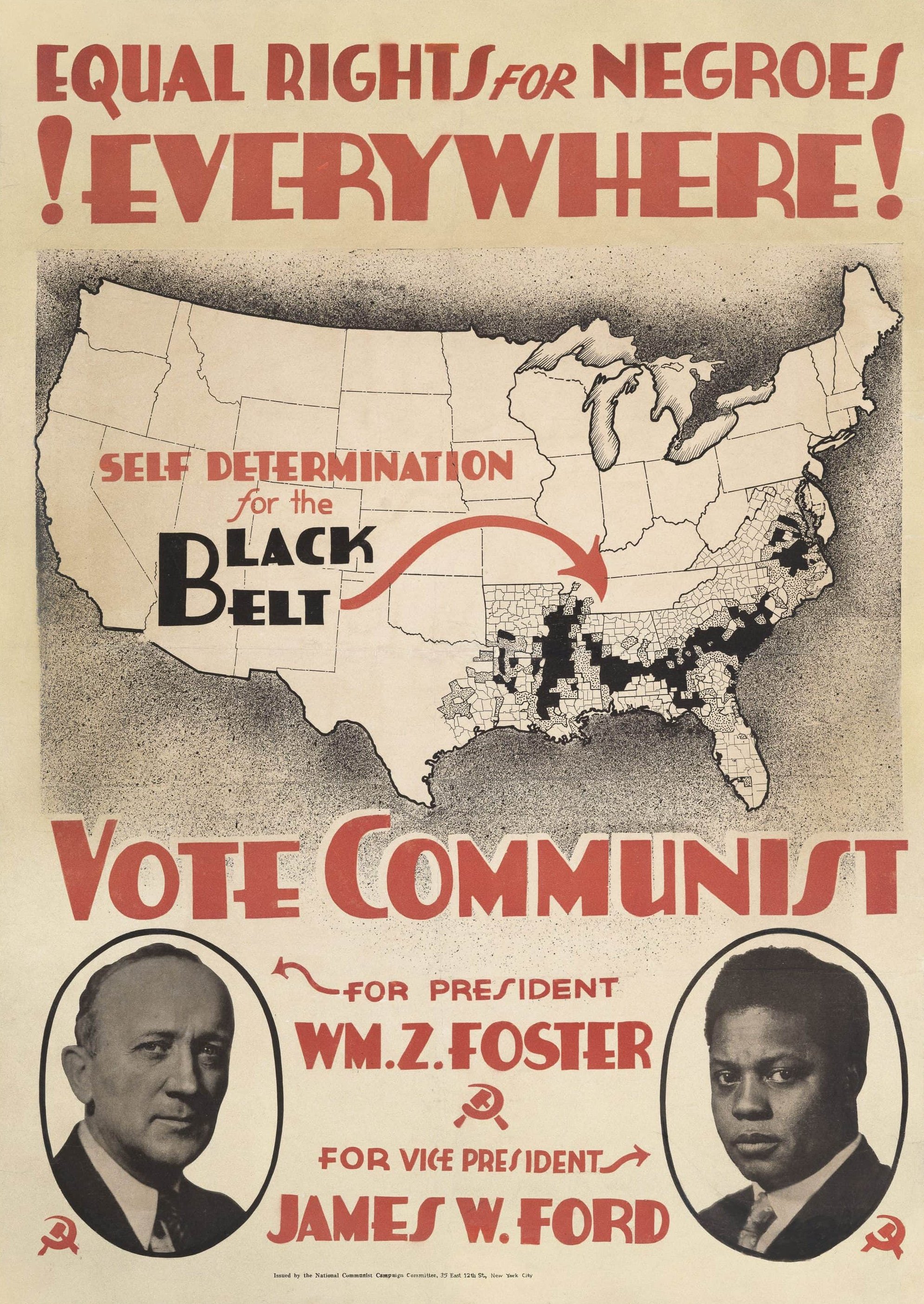
1932 Communist Party campaign poster, advocating self-determination for the Black Belt in the American South.

The idea of autonomy or outright independence was also advocated by American communist activists. Beginning in 1917, the black liberation activist Cyril Briggs wrote a number of editorials calling for a "colored autonomous state" on U.S. soil, first in the New York Amsterdam News and later in the publication The Crusader, which he founded in 1918. The Communist Party USA (CPUSA) later adopted the suggestion that African Americans in the "Black Belt" region constituted an oppressed nation, and that they should be allowed to vote on self-determination, as had populations following World War I under the rules of the League of Nations. After fierce debate in the Sixth World Congress of the Communist International (Comintern) in 1928, the CPUSA officially adopted a plan for self-determination for an African-American nation in the region. This was followed by a 1930 resolution calling for immediate measures for the organization of “proletarian and peasant self-defense” against the Ku Klux Klan.

Although Josef Stalin was the leader of the Communist Party of the Soviet Union at the time and the architect of the Comintern's line on the national question, the Black Belt national proposal drew its roots from the thinking of Vladimir Lenin, who identified what he described as an African-American nation in the southern US. African-American activist Harry Haywood is generally recognized as the principal theoretician of the CPUSA's Black Belt line. The idea was also mentioned by James W. Ford and James S. Allen in The Negroes in a Soviet America (1935). It was suggested that such a state might later favor federation with a communist United States. The historian Mark Solomon suggests that what Allen meant by self-determination was something short of outright independence:

"Self-determination was defined as democracy at its essence: self-government, self-organization, social and economic equality, the right of blacks to run their own lives without the relentless terror and racism that dogged their steps and made every waking day a living hell."

The idea of an independent state drew criticism for the perceived implication that Black people were not really American, or that all Black people in America might be relocated there. US party leaders and many Black Americans within the communist movement opposed the plan as an example of Jim Crow-style segregation and white chauvinism, and unhelpful in alleviating the position of Black people in America at that time.

Leon Trotsky also engaged with members of the American Socialist Workers Party on reaching the Black population. He corresponded with C.L.R. James on the question of self-determination and expressed support for Black Americans seeking equal rights and an autonomous state.

Given the CPUSA's proposal on the national question, it enjoyed large-scale party growth in the US South. But the party was also involved in organizing agricultural workers and supporting African-American civil rights, which most Black Americans considered more important. In Alabama, for instance, the Party organized the Sharecroppers' Union (SCU) in 1931, which grew to "a membership of nearly 2,000 organized in 73 locals, 80 women's auxiliaries, and 30 youth groups." During the same period, the CPUSA also alienated much of the African-American working class by excoriating other self-determination organizations such as the Movement for a 49th State and the back-to-Africa-oriented Peace Movement of Ethiopia for not toeing the party line on self-determination.

In 1935, the CPUSA abandoned its line on national self-determination for the Black Belt. It wanted to attract coalition support from middle-class African-American groups in the Northeast as a part of the Party's "Hands Off Ethiopia" campaign, launched after Italian forces under Mussolini invaded Ethiopia in the same year. In 1945, former CPUSA leader Earl Browder told the House Un-American Activities Committee that claims of official communist plans for a "Soviet Negro Republic" were false. Haywood and allies tried to promote the Black Belt national question in the 1950s, without success.

In the early 1960s, the John Birch Society tied the African-American civil rights movement to these earlier communist efforts towards African-American self-determination. Literature promoting this idea appeared during the Barry Goldwater 1964 presidential campaign, disturbing Goldwater, who viewed it as racist.

Communists did not officially support an African-American state again until the emergence of the anti-revisionist New Communist movement (NCM) in the 1970s and 1980s. After being expelled by the CPUSA, Haywood joined the October League (OL), which eventually became the Communist Party (Marxist–Leninist). Both the OL and the CP (ML) adopted the old CPUSA line calling for self-determination for residents of the Black Belt. Other New Communist Movement groups, like the Communist League and the Revolutionary Workers Headquarters, also took up the Black Belt line.

=== In the 21st century ===
In the 21st century, several communist organizations have continued to uphold the Black Belt national line. Chief among them is the Freedom Road Socialist Organization (FRSO, descended from NCM groups), which continues to organize around the line. The FRSO has published several pamphlets and statements on the African-American national question in the Black Belt. They uphold the right of national self-determination by the region.

The Malcolm X Grassroots Movement is another revolutionary organization upholding the right of self-determination for residents of the Black Belt.

== Republic of New Afrika ==
The Republic of New Afrika was an organization which sought three key goals:

- Creation of an independent African-American-majority country situated in the southeastern United States, in the heart of black-majority population. A similar claim is made for all the black-majority counties and cities throughout the United States.
- Payment of several billion dollars in reparations to African-American descendants of slaves by the US government for the damages inflicted on Africans and their descendants by chattel enslavement, Jim Crow segregation, and modern-day forms of racism.
- A referendum of all African Americans to determine their desires for citizenship; movement leaders say they were not offered a choice in this matter after emancipation in 1865 following the American Civil War.

Established in 1968, the RNA attracted a number of members, including Robert F. Williams, Betty Shabazz and Chokwe Lumumba. The organization persists to this day.

== See also ==
- Legal status of Hawaii
  - Hawaiian sovereignty movement
  - United States federal recognition of Native Hawaiians
- Aboriginal self-government in Canada
- Ethnic separatism
- Ethnic nationalism
- Indigenous rights
- Self-determination
  - Self-determination of Australian Aborigines
  - Native American self-determination
    - Tribal sovereignty
- National questions
- Racial oppression
