= Washington, D.C. Admission Act =

Proposed bill in the United States Congress

- Long title: To provide for the admission of the State of Washington, D.C. into the Union
- Announced in: the 118th United States Congress
- Sponsored by: Eleanor Holmes Norton (D–DC)
- Number of co-sponsors: 206

Legislative history
- Introduced in the House of Representatives as H.R. 51 by Eleanor Holmes Norton (D–DC) on January 9, 2023; Committee consideration by Oversight and Reform

The Washington, D.C. Admission Act, often referred to simply as the D.C. Admission Act, is a bill introduced during the 116th United States Congress. The bill would grant Washington, D.C., admission into the Union as a state (which would also make it the country's first and only city-state). The bill was originally introduced in the 116th Congress on January 3, 2019, and was reintroduced on January 4, 2021, and January 9, 2023, in the 117th and 118th Congresses. The United States House of Representatives passed it on April 22, 2021.

== Background ==
The Constitution of the United States was drafted to provide for a federal capital district that was not part of any state. The new capital was to be no more than 100 square miles (260 km^{2}) in area and under the exclusive control of the Congress. In 1790, the Congress passed the Residence Act, which legislated the foundation of a new, permanent national capital, to be located along the banks of the Potomac River, using land ceded to the federal government by Maryland and Virginia. The District was designed as a square diamond, each side 10 miles (16 km) long, with 65 percent of the District's territory on the northeast bank of the Potomac River and 35 percent on the southwest bank. The District included the pre-existing county and city of Alexandria, as well as the new County of Washington, which included the new City of Washington and the pre-existing town of Georgetown, Maryland. The District was named "Columbia" after a poetic name for the United States.

In 1801, Congress passed the District of Columbia Organic Act, which formally placed the Government of the District of Columbia under the control of the Congress. The Act meant that citizens living in the District were no longer residents of Maryland or Virginia and, as a consequence, no longer had representation in the Congress.

The incorporation of Alexandria County into the District caused serious economic injury to that community, so it was retroceded to Virginia in 1846. (The county was reorganized into the Independent City of Alexandria and the adjacent County of Arlington.) This reduced the district to its current size of 68 square miles (180 km^{2}). The same act that retroceded Alexandria to Virginia also amalgamated the municipalities within Washington County to the City of Washington; which was simultaneously consolidated with the County of Washington and the District itself.

Many reforms enacted concerning the District have focused on extending the franchise and popular control of the local government. The Twenty-third Amendment to the United States Constitution was ratified in 1961, under which the District of Columbia is treated as a state for purposes of the presidential election, except that it cannot have more electoral votes than the state with the least number of electors.

In 1970, Congress passed the District of Columbia Delegate Act, which allowed for the election of a non-voting delegate representing the District in the House of Representatives.

Congress then passed the District of Columbia Home Rule Act in 1973, which replaced the appointed mayor and city council with an elected mayor and council.

In 1978, a constitutional amendment was proposed that would have granted the District full representation and participation in Congress without granting it statehood. Introduced by Representative Don Edwards of California, the proposed amendment was approved by Congress on August 22, 1978, and dispatched to the states for ratification. The proposed amendment included a time clause that required states to ratify it within seven years of the proposal. But of 38 required, only 16 states had ratified the amendment by August 22, 1985, so the amendment failed. The failure of the District of Columbia Voting Rights Amendment saw the beginning of concerted efforts to bring about statehood for the District.

=== D.C. statehood movement ===
Even before the Voting Rights Amendment failed, voters in the District began looking at the statehood option. In 1980, voters approved the creation of a constitutional convention to meet and draw up a proposed constitution for a new state, in the same manner as other territories had before their admission as states. This was ratified by voters in 1982, with the plan for a state named as "New Columbia". This constitution mandates the selection of a shadow congressional delegation of two senators and a representative to lobby Congress for statehood. In November 1993, a statehood bill made it to the full House of Representatives for debate and a vote for the first time, where it was defeated by a 277–153 margin. Since then, a statehood bill has been introduced every year without reaching a vote.

In 2016, the mayor of the District, Muriel Bowser, called for a vote by residents on whether they approved of the proposal of admitting the District as a state. In November of the same year, a referendum was held in which 85.69% of those that voted approved the motion to petition Congress for admission. Following this, the D.C. council passed a resolution changing the proposed name from "New Columbia" (which had been on the ballot), to "State of Washington, D.C.", with "D.C." standing for "Douglass Commonwealth", referring to Frederick Douglass, who lived in the District between 1877 and 1895. In 2017, separate bills were introduced by the District's non-voting delegate, Eleanor Holmes Norton, and Tom Carper, a senator from Delaware, for statehood, which again failed to reach a vote.

In 2019, following the 2018 election that saw the Democratic Party regain control of the House of Representatives, the Democratic leadership put its support behind the admission of the District as a state, with Nancy Pelosi, the speaker of the House of Representatives, one of the 155 co-sponsors of the bill introduced by Eleanor Holmes Norton in January 2019. The House passed H.R. 1, a nonbinding resolution of support for statehood, in March 2019.

On June 26, 2020, D.C. statehood was approved by a chamber of Congress for the first time when the House voted by 232 to 180 to approve the Washington, D.C. Admission Act, thereby sending it to the Senate. Again sponsored in the Senate by Tom Carper, with the majority of the Democratic caucus as co-sponsors, the bill was the first time that the issue of D.C. statehood had reached the floor of the Senate.

== Provisions ==
The Washington, D.C. Admission Act would enact several individual provisions related to the new state's admission:

- The existing area of the District of Columbia would be admitted into the union as the 51st state. The new state would be named "Washington, Douglass Commonwealth", renaming itself after Frederick Douglass.
- A new federal district would be created within the new state's boundaries. To be called "the Capital", the new district would encompass the White House, United States Capitol, United States Supreme Court Building, the principal federal buildings, and other federal monuments adjacent to the Capitol and the National Mall.
- The John A. Wilson Building would be excluded from the Capital, as it would serve as the state capitol.
- The new state would elect two members of the Senate and, initially, one member of the House of Representatives.
- The House of Representatives would be permanently expanded to 436 members. Following the next census after admission, reapportionment would work out the number of representatives the new state would be entitled to based on its population.
- The District of Columbia Delegate Act would be repealed.
- An expedited process would be put in motion to introduce and ratify a new constitutional amendment repealing the 23rd Amendment.
- The residents in the Capital would be permitted to vote in the last state they resided in.
- The current local representatives (mayor and city council) would transition to become the new state's governor and state legislature.

== Opposition ==
Republicans have strongly opposed the legislation. Opponents of DC statehood also stated the bill violates the District Clause and the 23rd Amendment.

It is also noted that Republicans have partisan concerns over DC statehood because the district leans heavily Democratic, to the point that no Republican has been elected to the Council of the District of Columbia since 2009. In the 2020 presidential election, 92% of votes in Washington, D.C., went to Joe Biden, the highest percentage across the entire country, which is a key reason why many Democrats have favored D.C. admission to the Union.

On April 13, 2021, a group of 22 Republican state attorneys general led by Alan Wilson sent a letter to President Biden to oppose D.C. statehood. They threatened to challenge the Act in the U.S. Supreme Court if the Washington D.C. Admissions Act were to pass.

Alternatively, Republicans instead proposed that D.C. be retroceded into Maryland. On January 25, 2021, Representative Dusty Johnson introduced the District of Columbia-Maryland Reunion Act as H.R. 472, followed by Louie Gohmert as H.R. 2651 on April 19; in the Senate, Senator Roger Marshall sponsored S.1361 under the same name on April 22, 2021.

On April 30, Democratic senator Joe Manchin came out against both H.R. 51 and S. 51, effectively dooming their passage.

== Opinion ==
A poll conducted by YouGov in June 2020 following the passing of the bill by the House of Representatives during the 116th Congress found opinion remained divided on the issue, with 40% of voters in favor of D.C.'s admission as a state and 41% opposed. In this poll, 37% of respondents believed that admitting D.C. would favor Democrats over Republicans, while 30% felt it would benefit both parties equally and 5% felt it would favor Republicans over Democrats. A further YouGov poll, fielded october 18–21, 2020, found 36% opposed to statehood, 33% supportive, and 31% expressing neither view.

Other polls have shown a more positive reception to statehood. A poll undertaken in September 2020 by Data for Progress, a progressive think tank that itself supports statehood, found that support was at 43%, a seven-percent increase on a previous poll by the same group in March 2019. Another poll conducted by Data for Progress in February 2021 found that 54% of likely voters supported D.C. statehood, and just 35% were opposed. A YouGov poll conducted in April 2021 found 44% support versus 31% opposition.

Geoffrey Skelly at FiveThirtyEight noted that Data for Progress's question asked if they supported giving statehood "to the more than 714,000 Americans who live in Washington, D.C., so they can elect voting Senators and Representatives, just like Americans in every other state?", and suggested that it may have primed people in the poll to be more likely to give support for the measure. The reverse effect of this was seen when Rasmussen Reports asked the statehood question but stressed the constitutional objections to making the District of Columbia a state within the question, which led to just 29 percent of respondents supporting statehood versus 55 percent opposing it. Skelly noted that this could mean that advocates for D.C. statehood should focus on the equality argument in favor of it to win public support, while those that oppose it should focus on the legal constraints.

== Timeline ==
Voting for the bill in the House of Representatives was along party lines, with Democrats in favor of admitting the District of Columbia as a state and Republicans opposed. In response to the passing of the bill in the House, several Republican members of the Senate labeled the legislation as a "power grab" as, in their view, it would give the Democrats an almost guaranteed two seats in the United States Senate, given that the District has voted overwhelmingly Democratic for decades. The Trump administration also made clear that, were a bill admitting D.C. as a state to be passed by Congress, President Trump would veto it.

The election of Joe Biden as president removed the threat of a presidential veto to such a bill, as Biden has declared his support to admitting D.C. However, Mitch McConnell, the then-Senate majority leader, made it clear that while there remains a Republican majority in the Senate, any D.C. admission bill would not be granted a vote on the floor of the Senate. This would require the introduction of a new bill once the new session of Congress began on January 3, 2021.

On January 4, 2021, Eleanor Holmes Norton, D.C.'s non-voting delegate, reintroduced H.R. 51 into the 117th Congress with a record 202 co-sponsors. On January 6, following the victory of the two Democratic candidates in the Senate elections in Georgia that gave the Democrats the majority, the mayor of Washington, D.C., Muriel Bowser, issued a statement renewing the call for statehood for the District, stating her desire to see a Statehood bill on the desk of President Biden within 100 days of the start of the new Congress. The same day, the storming and occupation of the United States Capitol by supporters of President Trump led to calls from others for the District's status to be changed; because of its status, the activation of the District of Columbia National Guard to assist local law enforcement required the consent of the secretary of the Army, while the governors of Virginia and Maryland were able to activate units of their states' National Guard directly. On January 27, a companion bill, S. 51, was introduced into the Senate by Tom Carper with 38 co-sponsors (7 more signed on later by May 13). S. 51 received no votes and H.R. 51 was not acted on in the Senate following Manchin's opposition to them. In January 2025, Eleanor Holmes Norton and Maryland Senator Chris Van Hollen reintroduced the bill.

== Legislative history ==
As of November 17, 2026:

Congress	Short title	Bill number(s)	Date introduced	Sponsor(s)	No. of cosponsors	Latest action
116th Congress	Washington, D.C. Admission Act of 2019	H.R. 51	January 3, 2019	Eleanor Holmes Norton (D‑DC)	227	Passed in the House (232–180)
116th Congress	Washington, D.C. Admission Act of 2019	S. 631	February 28, 2019	Tom Carper (D‑DE)	42	Died in committee
117th Congress	Washington, D.C. Admission Act of 2021	H.R. 51	January 4, 2021	Eleanor Holmes Norton (D‑DC)	216	Passed in the House (216–208)
117th Congress	Washington, D.C. Admission Act of 2021	S. 51	January 26, 2021	Tom Carper (D‑DE)	45	Died in committee
118th Congress	Washington, D.C. Admission Act of 2023	H.R. 51	January 9, 2023	Eleanor Holmes Norton (D‑DC)	211	Died in committee
118th Congress	Washington, D.C. Admission Act of 2023	S. 51	January 24, 2023	Tom Carper (D‑DE)	46	Died in committee
119th Congress	Washington, D.C. Admission Act of 2025	H.R. 51	January 3, 2025	Eleanor Holmes Norton (D‑DC)	209	Referred to committee
119th Congress	Washington, D.C. Admission Act of 2025	S. 51	January 9, 2025	Chris Van Hollen (D‑MD)	43	Referred to committee

== See also ==
- Puerto Rico Status Act
