= 2016 Washington, D.C., statehood referendum =

District of Columbia referendum in support of becoming a U.S. state

- November 8, 2016
- Shall the voters of the District of Columbia advise the Council to approve or reject this proposal?
- Voting system: Simple majority

Results
Choice	Votes	%
Yes	234,134	85.17%
No	40,779	14.83%
Valid votes	274,913	88.38%
Invalid or blank votes	16,154	5.19%
Total votes	311,067	100.00%
Registered voters/turnout	478,688	64.98%
Precinct results
Yes
90–100%
80–90%
70–80%

A referendum on statehood for the District of Columbia was held on November 8, 2016. It was the first referendum on statehood to be held in the district. The District of Columbia was created following the passage of the Residence Act on July 9, 1790, which approved the creation of a national capital, the City of Washington on the Potomac River.

District of Columbia voters were asked to advise the Council to approve or reject a proposal, which included advising the council to petition Congress to admit the District as the 51st state and to approve a constitution and boundaries for the new state. The voters of the District of Columbia voted overwhelmingly to advise the Council to approve the proposal, with 85.69% of voters voting to advise approving the proposal.

== Background ==
=== Formation ===
On July 9, 1790, Congress passed the Residence Act, which approved the creation of a national capital on the Potomac River. The exact location was to be selected by President George Washington, who signed the bill into law on July 16. Formed from land donated by the states of Maryland and Virginia, the initial shape of the federal district was a square measuring 10 miles (16 km) on each side, totaling 100 square miles (259 km^{2}). (Note: The Residence Act allowed the President to select a location within Maryland as far east as the Anacostia River. However, the District of Columbia shifted the federal territory's borders to the southeast to include the city of Alexandria at the District's southern tip. In 1791, Congress amended the Residence Act to approve the new site, including territory ceded by Virginia.)

Congress passed the Organic Act of 1801, which officially organized the District and placed the entire territory under the exclusive control of the federal government. Further, the unincorporated area within the District was organized into two counties: the County of Washington to the east of the Potomac and the County of Alexandria to the west. After the passage of this Act, citizens living in the District were no longer considered residents of Maryland or Virginia, which therefore ended their representation in Congress.

The Virginia General Assembly voted in February 1846 to accept the return of Alexandria. On July 9, 1846, Congress agreed to return all the territory that Virginia had ceded. Therefore, the District's current area consists only of Maryland's originally donated portion. Confirming the fears of pro-slavery Alexandrians, the Compromise of 1850 outlawed the slave trade in the District, although not slavery itself.

=== Voting rights and home rule ===
In 1961, the Twenty-third Amendment to the United States Constitution was ratified, granting the District three votes in the Electoral College for the election of president and vice president, but still no voting representation in Congress.

In 1973, Congress enacted the District of Columbia Home Rule Act, providing for an elected mayor and 13-member council for the District.

=== Earlier attempts at statehood ===
Article IV, Section 3, Clause 1 of the Constitution gives Congress power to grant statehood. If the District were to become a state, congressional authority over the District would be terminated, and residents would have full voting representation in both houses of Congress. However, there are several constitutional considerations with any such statehood proposal.

In 1980, local citizens passed an initiative calling for a constitutional convention for a new state. In 1982, voters ratified the constitution of a new state to be called "New Columbia". This campaign for statehood stalled. After the District of Columbia Voting Rights Amendment expired in 1985, another constitution for the state of New Columbia was drafted in 1987. The House of Representatives last voted on D.C. statehood in November 1993, and the proposal was defeated 277–153. Like retrocession, it has been argued that D.C. statehood would erode the principle of a separate federal territory as the seat of the federal government and that a constitutional amendment would be needed to avoid a violation of the Constitution's District Clause.

In July 2014, President Barack Obama became the second sitting President, after Bill Clinton in 1993, to endorse statehood for the District of Columbia. In a town-hall event, he said, "I'm for it." He added that "folks in D.C. pay taxes like everybody else, they contribute to the overall well-being of the country like everybody else, they should be treated like everybody else," Obama said in response to a question. "There has been a long movement to get D.C. statehood, and I've been for it for quite some time. The politics of it end up being difficult to get through Congress, but I think it's absolutely the right thing to do." D.C. residents now pay more in taxes than 22 states.

For more than 20 years following the 1993 floor vote, there were no congressional hearings on D.C. statehood. But on September 15, 2014, the U.S. Senate Committee on Homeland Security and Government Affairs held a hearing on bill S. 132, which would have created a new state out of the current District of Columbia, similar to the 1993 bill.

=== Modern statehood movement ===
On April 15, 2016, District Mayor Muriel Bowser called for a citywide vote on whether the District should become the 51st state. This was followed by the release of a proposed state constitution. This constitution would make the Mayor of the District of Columbia the governor of the proposed state, while the members of the City Council would make up the proposed House of Delegates.

On July 10, 2016, the D.C. Council unanimously approved the referendum. During the 2016 General Election, 85.69% of voters approved the statehood referendum.

== Ballot ==
The District of Columbia voters were asked whether to advise the District Council to approve or reject a four-part proposal, where advising the council to approve the proposal would establish that the citizens of the District of Columbia (1) agree that the District should be admitted to the Union as the State of New Columbia; (2) approve of a Constitution of the State of New Columbia to be adopted by the Council; (3) approve the State of New Columbia's boundaries, as adopted by the New Columbia Statehood Commission on June 28, 2016; and (4) agree that the State of New Columbia shall guarantee an elected representative form of government.

However, while “New Columbia” appeared on voting ballots, the Council of the District of Columbia passed legislation changing the name of the proposed state to the "State of Washington, D.C." Under this proposed name "D.C." stands for "Douglass Commonwealth," a reference to the historic abolitionist Frederick Douglass.

=== Proposed Constitution ===
==== Boundaries ====
Proposed boundaries

The boundaries of the proposed state would be about the same as the boundaries of the District, except for a small area around the National Mall and the White House, allowing the federal government to maintain control over a much smaller district.

==== Government structure ====
The legislative branch of the proposed state government would consist of a unicameral 21-member Legislative Assembly. Each member of the legislature would serve a four-year term. The Governor of the proposed state would serve four-year terms and be elected in even years where there is no federal presidential election. When a vacancy occurs in the office, the Speaker of the Legislative Assembly would become the acting Governor until a special election occurs, which would have to occur at least seventy days, but no more than 174 days after the office becomes vacant. The proposed state would also be fiscally responsible for its judicial system, which the federal government currently funds. The attorney general would remain an independently elected office, while the new state would no longer have to submit laws or budgets to Congress for approval, as the District of Columbia is required to now.

Two years after the proposed state is admitted to the union, a constitutional convention would be called to make changes to the state constitution, and any changes would be voted on for approval or rejection by the voters of the proposed state.

== Results ==
In this election, when asked the referendum question, "Shall the voters of the District of Columbia advise the Council to approve or reject this proposal," this was the tally of the final vote:

Advisory Referendum B
Choice	Votes	%
For	244,134	85.69
Against	40,779	14.31
Total	284,913	100.00
Valid votes	284,913	91.59
Invalid/blank votes	26,154	8.41
Total votes	311,067	100.00
Registered voters/turnout	478,688	64.98

== Aftermath ==
While a majority of residents voted in favor of statehood, numerous challenges still exist that might hamper creation of the state, including lack of Congressional support; DC currently does not have voting-level congressional representation, and the national Republican Party is against the idea of statehood, due in part to political concerns that DC statehood would be detrimental to the Republicans since the new state would likely send an entirely Democratic delegation to Congress.

The prospect of statehood may raise Constitutional problems. "Article I, Section 8 [of the U.S. Constitution] provides explicitly for a national capital that would not be part of a state nor treated as a state, but rather a unique enclave under the exclusive authority of Congress—a neutral 'district' in which representatives of all the states could meet on an equal footing to conduct the nation's business." Statehood for Washington, D.C., would thus imply the passage of a Constitutional amendment and the creation of a new district to serve as the seat of the federal government. However, the DC Admission Act retains a federal "district" (the bill dubs it "The Capital") that the federal government will still administer by shrinking the existing federal district down to a minimal size while granting the rest of DC statehood.

In 2017, separate bills were introduced by the District's non-voting Delegate, Eleanor Holmes Norton, and Tom Carper, a senator from Delaware, for statehood, which again failed to reach a vote.

In 2019, following the 2018 election that saw the Democratic Party regain control of the House of Representatives, the Democratic leadership put its support behind the admission of the District as a state, with Nancy Pelosi, the Speaker of the House of Representatives, one of the 155 co-sponsors of the Bill introduced by Eleanor Holmes Norton in January 2019. The House passed H.R. 1, a nonbinding resolution of support for statehood, in March 2019.

In June 2020, during the George Floyd protests that took place across the country, then-U.S. President Trump called in the District of Columbia National Guard to clear protesters, an action that angered the District's mayor and council; owing to the District's status, the President of the United States is the commander-in-chief of the National Guard, whereas in a state the commander-in-chief is the state's governor. On June 26, for the first time, D.C. statehood was approved by a chamber of Congress when the House voted 232–180 to approve the Washington, D.C., Admission Act, thereby sending it to the Senate. Again sponsored in the Senate by Tom Carper, with the majority of the Democratic caucus as co-sponsors, the bill was the first time that the issue of DC statehood had reached the floor of the Senate.

Voting for the bill in the House of Representatives was along party lines, with Democrats in favor of admitting the District of Columbia as a state and Republicans opposed. In response to the passing of the bill in the House, several Republican members of the Senate labeled the legislation as a "power grab" as, in their view, it would give the Democrats an almost guaranteed two seats in the United States Senate, given that the District has voted overwhelmingly Democratic for decades. The Trump Administration also made clear that, were a bill admitting the District of Columbia as a state to be passed by Congress, Trump would veto it.

The election of Joe Biden as President removed the threat of a presidential veto to such a bill, and Biden declared his support to admit the District of Columbia. However, Mitch McConnell, the then Senate Majority Leader, made it clear that while there remains a Republican majority in the Senate, any D.C. admission bill would not be granted a vote on the floor of the Senate. This would require the introduction of a new bill once the new session of Congress began on January 3, 2021.

On January 4, Eleanor Holmes Norton, the District of Columbia's non-voting delegate, reintroduced H.R. 51 into the 117th Congress with a record 202 co-sponsors. On January 6, following the victory of the two Democratic candidates in the Senate elections in Georgia that gave the Democrats the majority, and thus made Senator Chuck Schumer (a D.C. statehood supporter himself) the new Majority Leader, the Mayor of Washington, D.C., Muriel Bowser, issued a statement renewing the call for statehood for the District, stating her desire to see a Statehood bill on the desk of President Biden within 100 days of the start of the new Congress. The same day, the storming and occupation of the United States Capitol by supporters of Donald Trump led to calls from others for the District's status to be changed; because of its status, the activation of the District of Columbia National Guard to assist local law enforcement required the consent of the Secretary of the Army, while the Governors of Virginia and Maryland were able to activate units of their states' National Guard directly. On January 27, a companion bill, S. 51, was introduced into the Senate by Tom Carper with a record 38 co-sponsors. On April 14, the United States House Committee on Oversight and Reform voted to pass the bill, paving the way for the House of Representatives to vote on it. The House passed H.R. 51 on the 22nd with a vote of 216–208.

On April 30, Democratic senator Joe Manchin came out against both H.R. 51 and S. 51, effectively dooming their passage.

== See also ==
- Washington, D.C., Admission Act
- 2020 Puerto Rican status referendum
- District of Columbia statehood movement
- Puerto Rico statehood movement
- 51st state
