= Tom Oliverson =

American politician (born 1972)

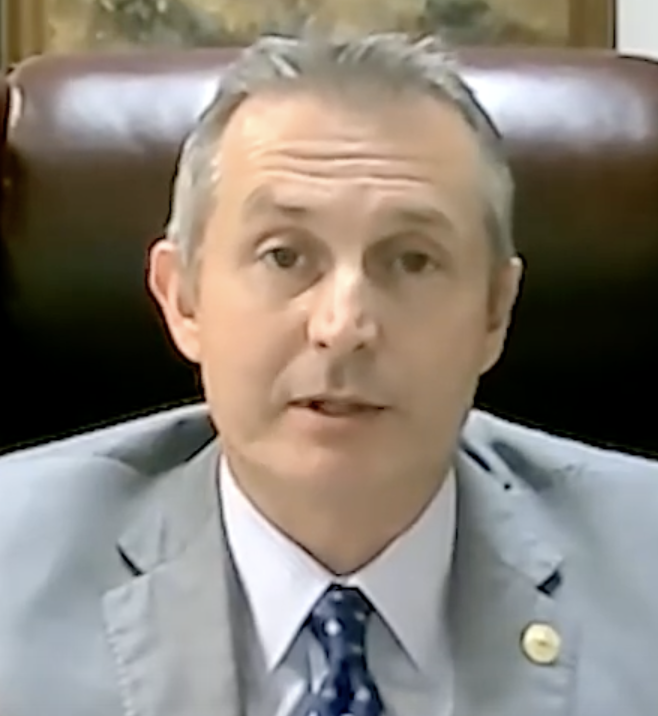
- Oliverson in 2021

Majority Leader of the Texas House of Representatives
- Incumbent
- Assumed office April 3, 2024
- Preceded by: Craig Goldman

Member of the Texas House of Representatives from the 130th district
- Incumbent
- Assumed office January 10, 2017
- Preceded by: Allen Fletcher

Personal details
- Born: Thomas John Oliverson; June 8, 1972 (age 54)
- Party: Republican
- Spouse: Jennifer
- Children: 3
- Education: Sam Houston State University (BS); Baylor College of Medicine (MD)
- Website: Office website Campaign website

Thomas John Oliverson (born June 8, 1972) is an American politician and anesthesiologist who is a Republican member of the Texas House of Representatives for District 130.

== Biography ==
A 2000 graduate of the Baylor College of Medicine in Houston, Oliverson is affiliated with U.S. Anesthesia Partners, which operates more than one thousand anesthesiology groups in Texas. He consults with physicians and dentists in regards to patient office surgery. In 2015, Oliverson and his wife, Jennifer, were named to the inaugural committee of Lieutenant Governor Dan Patrick, the presiding officer of the Texas State Senate.

The Oliversons home school their three children and reside in suburban Cypress, Texas. They are active members of Jersey Village Baptist Church, which was founded in Houston in 1956.

== Political career ==
Oliverson retained prominent Republican political strategist Allen Blakemore, and handily won the Republican House nomination over Kay Smith, 16,988 votes (70 percent) to 7,265 (30 percent). No Democrat sought the position in the November 8 general election, held in conjunction with the 2016 presidential election.

Oliverson contends that property taxes in Harris County are "too high, and we need meaningful tax relief now." He supports automatic reductions in property tax rates when revenues increase above expected levels. He supports the "fair tax" system as a means to abolish property taxes.

Despite the overall Democratic sweep of Harris County, Oliverson handily won his second term in the state House in the general election held on November 6, 2018. He defeated the Democrat Fred Infortunio, 52,063 votes (68.5 percent) to 22,562 (29.7 percent). The remaining 864 votes (1.5 percent) went to the Libertarian Roy Eriksen.

Oliverson earned recognition in June 2019 from Texas Monthly magazine as one of Texas' top lawmakers for his work on passing health care legislation and working with Republicans and Democrats during Texas' 86th Legislative session.

In 2021, during the ongoing COVID-19 pandemic, Oliverson called for rescinding rules on mask requirements in the Texas legislature chamber. Public health experts recommended that people use face masks while indoors in public places to prevent the spread of COVID-19.

On May 12, 2023 Oliverson sponsored House Bill 1686 to ban certain gender-affirming medical treatments for transgender minors.

On March 5, 2025, Oliverson sponsored House Bill 3817 to make it a felony for a transgender person to identify themself to their employer or a governmental entity as any gender other than that matching their assigned sex the penalty of which would be a $10,000 fine and two years in prison.

Texas House of Representatives
Preceded by Craig Goldman	Majority Leader of the Texas House of Representatives; 2024–present	Incumbent
