= Black Belt in the American South =

Social history in the southeastern US

- Cultural region of the United States
- Country: United States
- States: Alabama; Arkansas; Florida; Georgia; Louisiana; Maryland; Mississippi; North Carolina; South Carolina; Tennessee; Texas; Virginia

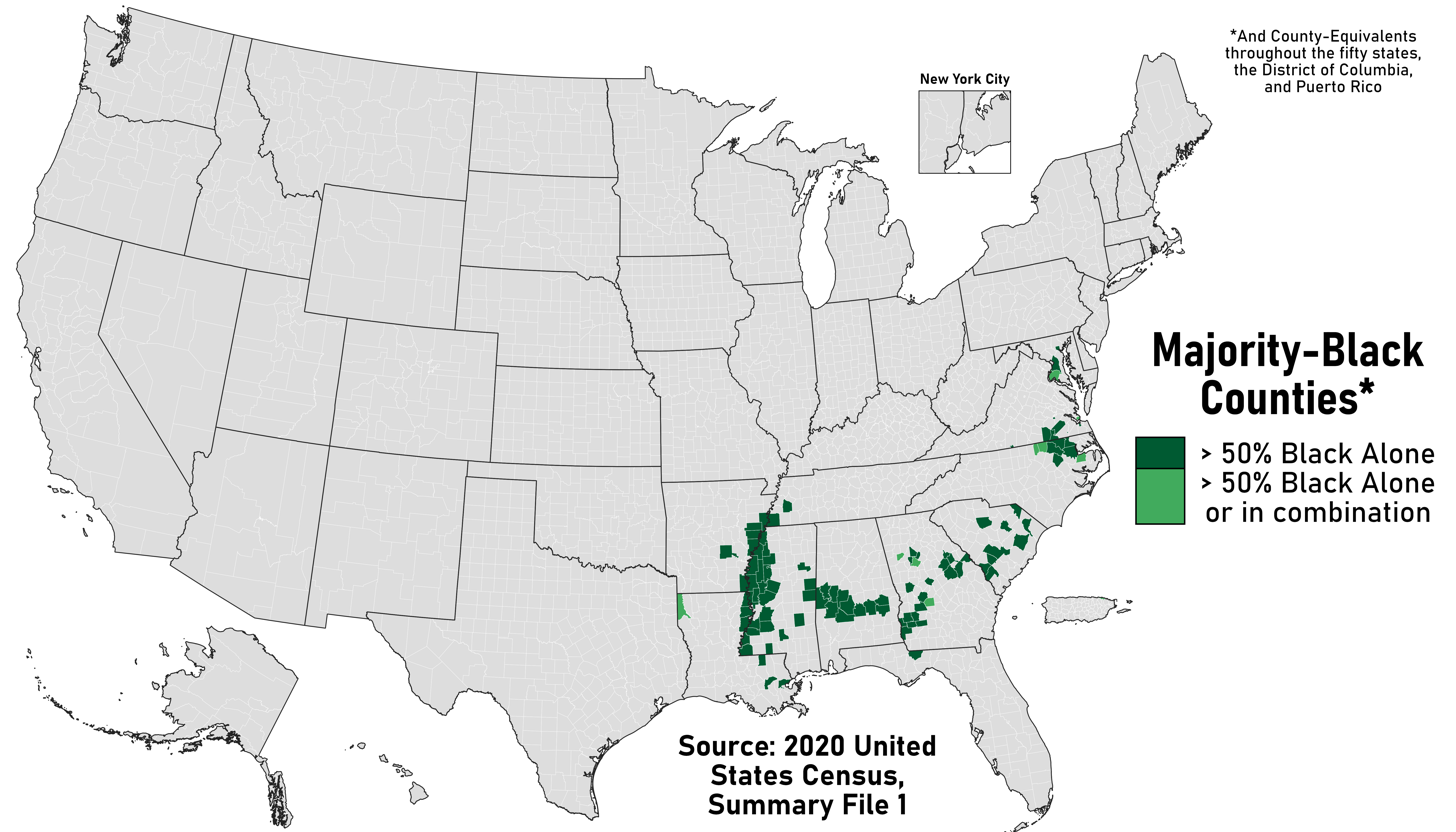
Majority-Black counties in the U.S. as of the 2020 United States Census

The Black Belt in the American South is a geopolitical region comprising areas with both historical and current majority African American populations. The term for the geopolitical region comes from that of the geological formation known as the Black Belt, named for the highly fertile black soil, and the history of the region regarding slavery. Historically, the Black Belt economy was based on cotton plantations – along with some tobacco plantation areas along the Virginia–North Carolina border. The valuable land was largely controlled by affluent white people and worked by primarily black people, who in many counties constituted a majority of the population. As the term applies to the sociopolitical region, it generally describes a region larger than that defined by its geology.

After 1945, a large fraction of the laborers were replaced by machinery, and they joined the Great Migration to cities of the Midwest and West. Political analysts and historians continue to use Black Belt to designate some 200 counties in the South from Virginia to Texas that have a history of majority African American population and cotton production.

== Definitions ==
By 1894, political commentators used the term Black Belt so often that the term was already very well known in the United States. The Nation reported in 1894:

There are 12 counties in Alabama in each of which the blacks are twice as numerous as the whites. These 12 counties, stretching across southern Central Alabama from Georgia and Mississippi, constitute the principal portion of the famous Black Belt.

By 1900, the term Black Belt was commonly used to denote a geopolitical region, much like later coinages such as Snow Belt, Rust Belt, Sun Belt and Bible Belt. Booker T. Washington wrote in his 1901 autobiography

I have often been asked to define the term "Black Belt". So far as I can learn, the term was first used to designate a part of the country which was distinguished by the colour of the soil. The part of the country possessing this thick, dark, and naturally rich soil was, of course, the part of the South where the slaves were most profitable, and consequently they were taken there in the largest numbers. Later, and especially since the war, the term seems to be used wholly in a political sense—that is, to designate the counties where the black people outnumber the white.

The boundaries of the subregion depend on the exact criteria being used. Census data is used to identify rural Southern counties with a large black population in a particular year. Which percentage and which year depends on the goals of the project—to look at history, or at current patterns, or to project future trends. In 1980, Southern counties with at least 25% African American populations comprised 29% of the Southern United States' population, falling to 23% in 2005. The white population in the same counties fell from 23% to 17%. In total numbers, these counties included 6,700,000 blacks in 1980, and 8,400,000 in 2005. They included 10,700,000 whites in 1980 and 11,700,000 in 2005. The book by sociologist Howard W. Odum Southern Regions of the United States (1936) pulled together a wide variety of facts and figures about the Southeast. This book was heavily used by government administrators and regional planners as well as scholars. In 1936, sociologist Arthur Raper described the Black Belt as some 200 plantation counties where blacks represented more than 50% of the population, lying "in a crescent from Virginia to Texas". Black population decreased in some areas after the Second Great Migration, when 4.5 million rural blacks left the region from 1940 to 1970. But the University of Alabama in 2007 classifies "roughly 200 counties" as comprising the Black Belt, with significant black populations. The Mississippi Encyclopedia adds to this definition a long history of cotton production.

Political activists and historians continue to use Black Belt in considering politics in predominantly black rural areas in the South. For example, in 1962, Martin Luther King Jr. wrote of his "People to People" tour through the Black Belt of Virginia: "The idea of 'massive resistance' was spawned not in Georgia or Alabama—but in the hearts of the Southside Virginia, commonly known as the Black Belt."

In 1964, King met with black leaders in to find a target locale to publicize the civil rights movement in Alabama. Large cities were eliminated, so according to historian Charles S. Aiken, "King had only the state's small nonmetropolitan cities from which to select the place to focus the campaign for new voting rights legislation. ... There was no other choice but the "open spaces" of the Black Belt, and in the Black Belt there was no alternative to Selma." In 2012, political scientist Seth McKee concluded that in the 1964 election, "Once again, the high level of support for Goldwater in the Deep South, and especially their Black Belt counties [where most blacks were still disenfranchised], spoke to the enduring significance of white resistance to black progress."

== Political power ==
The "Redeemers", a Southern Democratic political coalition that sought to enforce white supremacy, came to power after Reconstruction ended in 1877 and ousted Black and White Republicans from political office across the South. Historian Edward L. Ayers argues the Redeemers were sharply divided, however, and fought for control of the Democratic Party:

For the next few years the Democrats seemed in control of the South, but even then deep challenges were building beneath the surface. Behind their show of unity, the Democratic Redeemers suffered deep divisions. Conflicts between upcountry and Black Belt, between town and country, and between former Democrats and former Whigs divided the Redeemers. The Democratic party proved too small to contain the ambitions of all the white men who sought its rewards, too large and unwieldy to move decisively.

During the period of disfranchisement after the Reconstruction era, mainly the years 1890–1907, white Democrats passed new state constitutions and state laws, and used informal local practices across the South to prevent African American citizens from registering to vote and voting. States became one-party Democratic bastions in which the general election was a formality. The real battles took place inside the Democratic Party primaries, which were made private by law and not open to blacks. The result was to thwart the objective of the Fifteenth Amendment to the Constitution, which sought to protect the suffrage of freedmen after the American Civil War. Congress did not object, and the Supreme Court generally approved.

The mostly black Republican Party of the South rarely won any Black Belt elections after 1900, but it did send delegates to the presidential nominating conventions every four years, thus giving blacks some voice in national politics. President William Howard Taft used black Southern support to defeat ex-President Theodore Roosevelt for the GOP nomination in 1912.

After 1900, African Americans, the majority of the population in most of the Black Belt, were rarely allowed to vote, apart from a few ministers, businessmen and schoolteachers. Political power was in the hands of a relatively closed white elite comprising the major landowners, along with local merchants and bankers. They had almost complete control of local government. They generally also had control of the state legislatures, which gerrymandered political districts to strongly favor rural areas and under-represent the cities.

By the 1950s, many counties had a local Citizens' Council (the groups were commonly referred to as the "White Citizens' Councils"), which was part an associated network of white supremacist, extreme right organizations that directed white resistance to racial integration, especially against integrating the public schools.

Federal intervention changed the situation in the 1970s. The Voting Rights Act of 1965 was strictly enforced, to expand the franchise. During the 1960s, the US Supreme Court ruled in several cases covering rural bias in legislatures, saying that under the Equal Protection Clause, states needed to redistrict based on the principle of one man, one vote for equitable representation. As a result, states were prohibited from having bicameral legislatures in which one house was elected by county. In addition, the Court required the states to redistrict every decade to reflect census data, which many had neglected to conduct. The result was to shift political power toward the more populated and industrialized urban areas.

== Tenant farming ==
Until the mid-20th century, the predominant agricultural system in the Black Belt involved interdependent white land owners, tenant farmers, and sharecroppers; most of the latter groups were African Americans. Tenants typically owned their own tools and draft animals, while the sharecroppers provided no capital and paid fees to the landowner with a share of the crop produced. Very little cash changed hands. The few existing local banks were small; cash was scarce and had to be saved by the landowners for paying taxes.

The early 1920s were especially difficult financially in cotton growing regions. The boll weevil, a beetle that feeds on cotton buds and flowers, had migrated into the United States from Mexico in the late 19th century and had infested all U.S. cotton-growing areas by the 1920s, devastating the industry and the people working in the American South. The price of cotton plunged from 37 cents per pound in early 1920 to 10 cents in mid-1921. Land prices plunged 80% and tax rates went up. Tenants could not repay the storekeepers. Land owners were squeezed, for many had used credit to buy land during the World War bubble; and many farms were foreclosed—all this before the Great Depression struck in 1929. Raper's analysis of Black Belt banks shows that deposits plunged by half or more from 1918 to 1932. As a result, most local people became "very shy of banks." New Deal agricultural programs helped the land owners much more than the tenants.

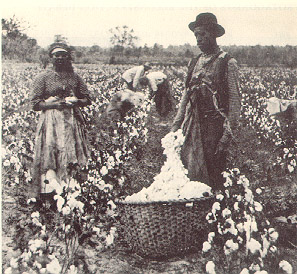
Picking cotton, 1886

Landowners needed a great deal of labor at harvest time to pick cotton. The typical plan after the Civil War and emancipation of the slaves who had provided labor on vast estates in the American South during the antebellum period was for planters to divide the old plantations into many smaller farms that were then assigned to tenant farmers. The tenant farmer and his family worked their plot of land and provided the labor to plant and harvest the crop. Throughout the year, the tenants usually bought food and supplies weekly, on credit, through the local country store (sometimes owned by the planter).

At harvest time, the tenants picked and sold their cotton, paid the merchant, and gave the landowner his one-third. There seldom was much cash left over. For sharecroppers, the landlord supplied all their needs during the year and then took the crop. The annual cycle started again, often with a large turnover of sharecroppers. Landowners also worked some of the land directly, using black labor paid in cash. The white landowners held all the political power, and fought vigorously against cash-dispensing government welfare programs that would undermine the cashless system. Economic historians Lee Alston and Joseph Ferrie (1999) describe the system as essentially an informal contract that bound employer and worker through the provision of housing, medical care, and other in-kind services along with cash wages. At its heart, it guaranteed a stable and adequate labor supply to the planter. Though restricted by the directives of the planter, workers in return received some measure of economic stability, including a social safety net, access to financial capital, and some physical protection in an often violent society.

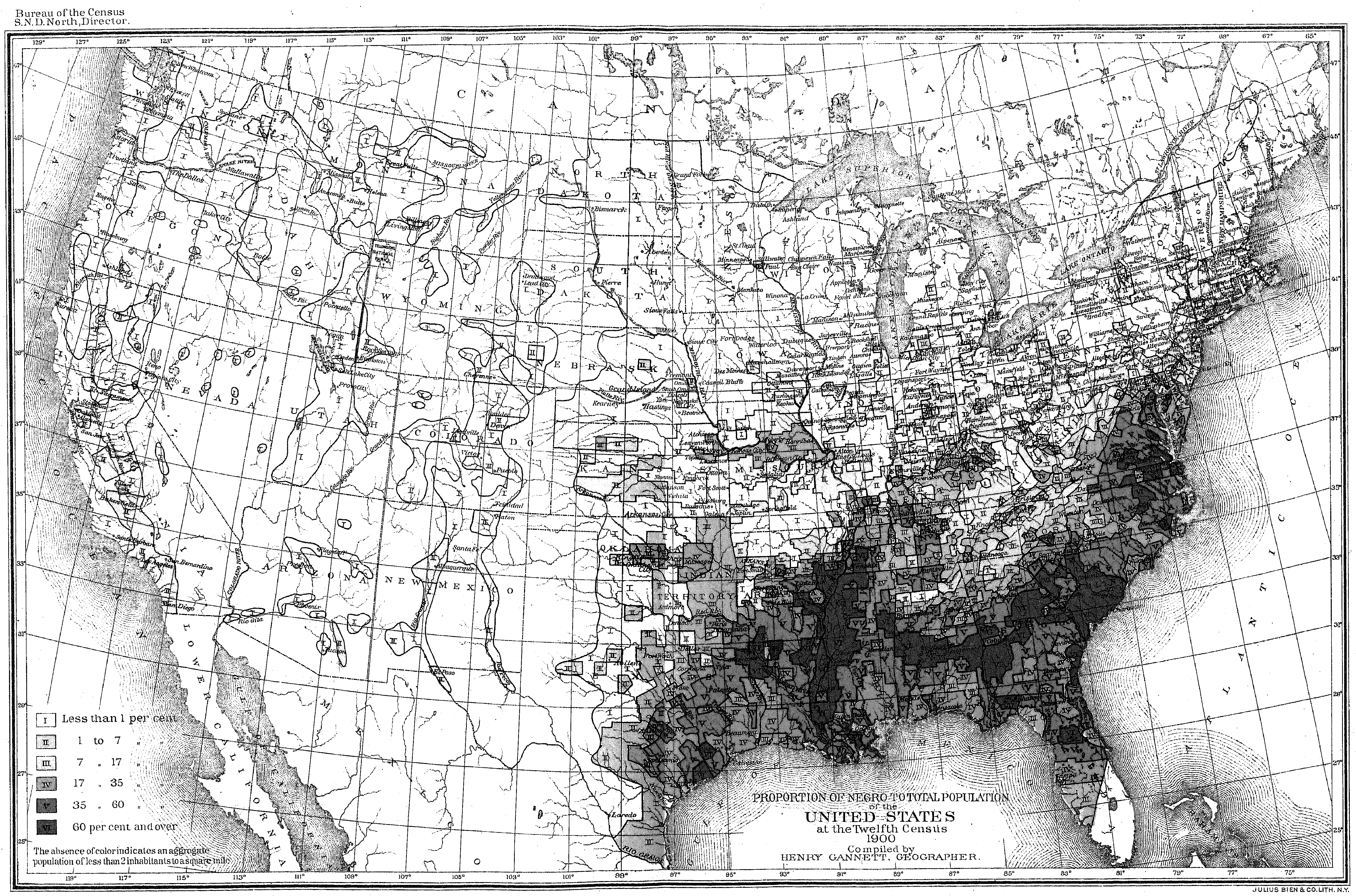
United States map of the Black American population from 1900 U.S. Census

There were few alternative jobs in the Black Belt region. When factories opened or retooled to supply the war effort in World War II, and the military draft was introduced, large numbers of African American farmers left for the army or cash-paying jobs in nearby or distant cities, particularly on the West Coast. This population movement was called the Great Migration. With the beginning of the war, outbound migration increased significantly.

A decade after the end of the war, a practical combination of more efficient machinery, such as tractors and cotton harvesters and chemical herbicides finally became available to cotton planters and many landowners began farming the land themselves. Their reduced need for resident farm labor forced many tenant farmers and sharecroppers off the land resulting in an even greater black emigration to the North and West. This is known as the Second Great Migration. Diversified agriculture replaced much of the cotton and tobacco, and gradually industrial-scale agriculture became dominant in large areas of the region.

== Quality of life ==
A map of the poverty rates in the United States by county. Areas such as the majority-black Mississippi Delta region have some of the highest poverty rates in the United States.

The rural Black Belt, with its largely African American population, has historically ranked toward the bottom of American regions in terms of quality of life indicators such as poverty rates, median incomes, mortality, unemployment rates, and educational levels. For example, since before the 1950s transportation routes have historically been inadequate in this region. To this day, air transportation facilities are limited.

Peter Daniels investigated how the government pushed back on supporting small farms and farmers and pushed more towards a climate of capitalism. Hierarchical systems were a proponent in this climate of capitalism that eroded the agricultural business. In 1913, the USDA planned to distribute payments to the farmers. The farmers felt like they were being pushed to the margin with the empty promises the FHA and Georgia government was giving them. This shows that the FHA, local, and national governments had racist motivation behind reforming the slave system and their efforts were not satisfactory. The USDA was only focusing on large and industrial farms. In turn, this would lead the small farmers (part of the Black Belt) off and out of their lands.

Salter, who worked at Tougaloo College, studied how industrialization affected black farmers. They talked about the fact that the chemical herbicides that the government had used to produce crops more quickly and of lesser quality, started to deteriorate the physical integrity of the lands. Farmers like the Salters could no longer depend on crops like cotton and seasonal crops to support their families, or sell enough to support their families. Even farmers who had more money saved before the government took over their farmlands were still in a parallel position to the lower class farmers. The family farmers and their lands were being replaced by industrial means, and their families stood no chance physically nor did their farms.

== Alabama ==
=== Religion ===
In the late 19th century, formerly enslaved African Americans in Alabama, now freedmen, were concentrated in the Black Belt, which ran across the central part of the state, mainly in Greene, Hale, Perry, Sumter, Marengo, Dallas, Wilcox, Lowndes, Montgomery, and Bullock counties. Freedmen established churches independent of white supervision, and their own Baptist state and regional associations. Baptist membership grew rapidly in the Black Belt, from a total of 71,000 in 1890 (of whom 86% were African American), to 215,000 in 1916.

==== White religion ====
The planters in the region had been affluent before the Civil War, and typically belonged to the Presbyterian, Episcopal, or Methodist churches. After the war, facing economic losses and disruption to the economy, many of the owners sold out and moved to distant cities. Presbyterian and Episcopal church membership fell. Among the whites, Methodism grew, as did Baptist congregations. In addition, new fundamentalist sects, such as Holiness and Nazarene, began to emerge, but their rapid growth came after 1900.

In the white community, Baptist church services were typically held Sundays at 11 AM and 6 PM, with an earlier Sunday school for children. During the week, there were prayer meetings and meetings of the ladies' society and missionary organizations. Smaller rural churches shared a rotating pastor and had a lighter schedule. Occasionally the Baptists would hold rallies promoting membership drives, domestic missions, Christian education, religious literature, prayer in the home, Christian citizenship, and one outside issue, laws to promote temperance. Until the late 19th century, the preachers continued to focus on the need for revivals, and Sabbath observance, on the evils of Catholicism, card playing, dancing and personal sin in general. Every few weeks the churches held trials of their own members for sins such as drunkenness, dancing, or adultery; the usual participant punishment was humiliation or expulsion from the congregation. The theology was traditional, with no trace of modernist readings of the Bible. Unlike the Methodists and Presbyterians, few Baptist pastors were educated. Instead, the local congregation selected and ordained ministers on the basis of their religiosity and ability to articulate God's word. By 1900, the range of sermons and editorials had been enlarged to cover new social themes. Baptists still opposed Catholicism, but now they talked of cooperation with other Protestant churches. There was less emphasis on card playing and dancing, and more interest in issues of underpaid laborers, coal miners, and workers in sweatshops. This indicated a newfound interest in the Social Gospel, although not nearly at the level of Northern Protestant churches. Racial tensions and discrimination was not mentioned, nor the rate of lynchings, which peaked in the late 19th and early 20th centuries.

==== Black religion ====
Many, probably most, slaves had become Christians during the antebellum period. Their religious preferences focused on evangelical religion with strong participation by the congregations, and led by a strong minister who typically was also a political leader. By 1867, freedmen, with help from the Freedmen's Bureau, began organizing their own separate all-black churches. Northern Methodist missionaries helped organize such churches as were affiliated with the national Methodist Church. More popular were the African Methodist Episcopal Church and African Methodist Episcopal Zion Church, the first independent black denominations, whose missionaries planted thousands of new churches.

White southern Methodists had a separate body, and they sponsored the Colored Methodist Episcopal Church. Small numbers of African Americans belonged to the Episcopalian and Presbyterian churches. All the Methodists had a hierarchical organization led by bishops.

Many blacks organized independent Baptist churches, quick to establish congregations without white supervision. At their first state convention in 1868, the 60 Baptists attending represented 32 churches. By 1881 the church had 50 district associations, 600 churches, 700 preachers, and about 90,000 members in the state, and operated a small seminary in Selma; most of the ministers were strong orators but barely literate. Although the revivalist camp meeting movement was fading away in the white churches, it grew more popular in the black community. In addition to all-day Sunday services, many Black Baptists became active in Sunday schools and missionary societies.

=== Sharecropping and tenant farmers ===
Although racial tensions often grew violent during the Reconstruction era (1863–1877), in the Alabama black belt some compromise was reached through a sharecropping system in which local black farmers were under the protection of rich white landowners. According to a review of a 2015 history of Reconstruction in Alabama:

The strength of African-American activism and, to a lesser extent, the moderation of elite planters meant that in the black belt Reconstruction essentially worked. Sharecropping developed as a compromise that allowed white planters to make money while black workers preferred its relatively greater autonomy in comparison to slavery. As a result of the labor compromise that developed, the black belt saw less terroristic white supremacist violence than did northern Alabama. Fitzgerald's work thus adds specific teeth to the arguments of Steven Hahn—and before him, W. E. B. Du Bois —about the political acumen and solidarity of rural African Americans. White planters obviously were at the top of economic and political ladders, but black tenant farmers were real agents of power.

== Georgia ==
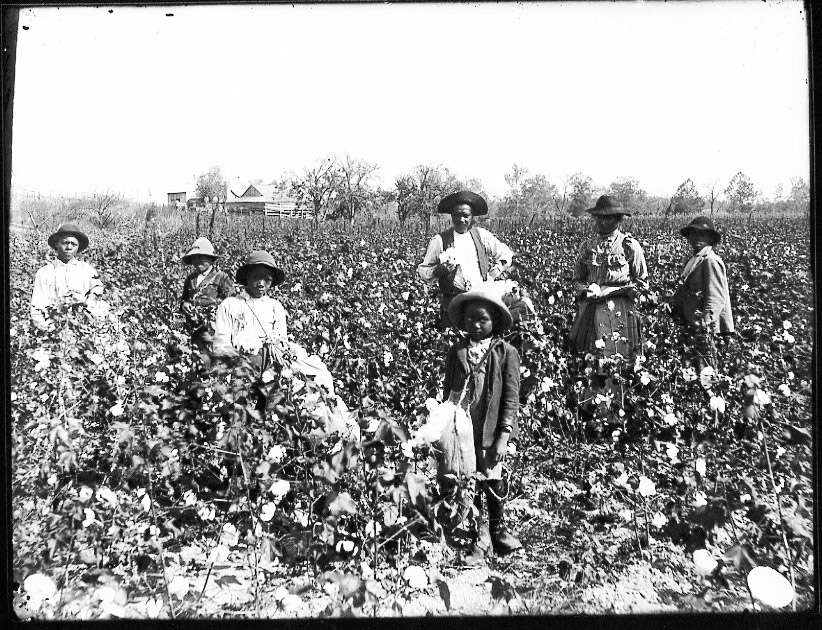
Picking cotton, 1890s

=== Religion ===
William J. Northen (1835–1913), was the Governor of Georgia from 1890 to 1894. A leading Baptist minister, Northen was president of the Georgia Baptist Convention from 1892 to 1910, and president of the Southern Baptist Convention from 1899 to 1901. His political rhetoric was based on his religious outlook. He often addressed racial issues at a time when the rate of lynching was growing rapidly. Northen believed that advances in medicine and health would ultimately help African Americans achieve salvation. He promoted the ideology of the modernizing New South, but did not abandon the policy of white supremacy.

=== Women ===
The study of women's history and gender roles in the Black Belt has been a recent development. Chrissy Lutz and Dawn Herd-Clark in 2019 explored the situation of black housewives in Georgia's black belt in the 1920s and 1930s. They worked with outside agencies to improve their own work efficiency and economic opportunities. Fort Valley State College, a historically black college, collaborated with the segregated unit of the Cooperative Extension Service, an educational arm of the United States Department of Agriculture. They trained and supplied black organizers, set up and funded local clubs, and gave farm and home demonstrations. They focused on the integral domestic work of cooking, hygiene, sewing, garden cultivation and food processing, and poultry raising. Not only did they teach new skills, they helped isolated rural women to meet each other and form supportive friendships. The systematic end of rural isolation meant that black rural women could affirm that "no one was on their own."

== Collapse of the Black belt plantation system ==
Economic historians of the South generally emphasize the continuity of the system of white supremacy and cotton plantations in the Black Belt from the late colonial era into the mid-20th century, when it collapsed. Harold D. Woodman summarizes the external forces that caused this disintegration from the 1920s to the 1970s:

When significant change finally occurred, its impetus came from outside the South. Depression-bred New Deal reforms, war-induced demand for labor in the North, perfection of cotton-picking machinery, and civil rights legislation and court decisions finally...destroyed the plantation system, undermined landlord or merchant hegemony, diversified agriculture and transformed it from a labor- to a capital-intensive industry, and ended the legal and extralegal support for racism. The discontinuity that war, invasion, military occupation, the confiscation of slave property, and state and national legislation failed to bring in the mid nineteenth century finally arrived in the second third of the twentieth century.

== Historiography and memory ==
=== W. E. B. DuBois ===
The most prominent analyst of the Black Belt was sociologist W. E. B. DuBois, who engaged in statistically based studies of family life, economic cooperation, and social conditions as editor of The Atlantic University Publications in the early 20th century. His 1903 book The Souls of Black Folk contains extensive analysis and reflection. Du Bois calls Albany, Georgia, in Dougherty County, the "heart of the Black Belt". He says: "Here are the remnants of the vast plantations."

How curious a land is this,- how full of untold story, of tragedy and laughter, and the rich legacy of human life; shadowed with a tragic past, and big with future promise!

Yet, he notes, it is not far from "where Sam Hose was crucified" [in a lynching], "to-day the centre of the Negro problem,-the centre of those nine million men who are America's dark heritage from slavery and the slave-trade." He continues: "Careless ignorance and laziness here, fierce hate and vindictiveness there,—these are the extremes of the Negro problem which we met that day, and we scarce knew which we preferred."

=== Restoration of old dwellings ===
The civil rights movement and related changes in the production of history of African Americans raised new interest in elements of their history in the South, including during slavery times. Since the late 20th century, there has been a new emphasis on the restoration, preservation and historical analysis of African American dwelling units in the Black Belt, especially those surviving from slavery days. Ashley A. Dumas, et al. explain the rationale:

Slave houses are artifacts. Their attributes can be recorded, analyzed, and broad patterns about their historical context, their builders, and inhabitants revealed. The methods of construction, for instance, often indicate climate, economy, and available technology. Ethnographic and archaeological studies demonstrate that houses, yards, and landscapes reflect cultural values and social relationships and changes to these. The organization of labor may be inferred from the placement of houses in relation to one another and to non-domestic buildings.

In certain areas of what was once the Black Belt, citizens began to honor the events that took place there.

In Selma, Alabama there is the Central Loop located in the heart of the city, which is rich in the Black Belt history. The Civil War Battle of Selma and the Voting Rights era were the heart of Selma's history. One attraction of Selma is the Edmund Pettus Bridge. This bridge gained widespread popularity when activists marched pridefully from Selma to Montgomery in opposition to discrimination against African Americans. Law enforcement came in and forcefully handled the protesters, with tear gas and physically assaulting the protesters. This showed the injustice and discrimination that the African Americans faced when they were just trying to fight for their rights. These events are now on TV for everyone to witness, and are termed "Bloody Sunday".

Led by Martin Luther King Jr. in the 1960s, the Voting Rights emerged. The people involved in the Voting Rights arranged the First Baptist Church. This church was used as a vehicle to give food, clothes, and supplies to fellow Voting Rights activists. The building where King spoke out against the discrimination that the African Americans were bearing, the church was destroyed in 1894 by law enforcement. In 1982, it was rebuilt as a historic site. It is the initial point where people go to start the Martin Luther King Jr. Street Historic Tour.

To honor one of the martyrs of the civil rights area, the Interpretive Center was constructed as part of the historic tour. The Interpretive Center replicates how the Kings lived, with replicas of furniture, paintings, and household items which the Kings had in their house during the time. Additionally, there is a film shown during the tour that is called, "Here I stand". It is a reenactment of how the King's house was bombed during the boycott.

Industrialization in small farming production was a mark of the history of the Black Belt. In Auburn, there were 1116 acres of land that were contaminated with fescue toxicity and were fed to cattle. This was just one of the 5 stations that were poisoned with toxic pesticides and fed cattle toxins to produce a higher quantity of food. Now, the plots have been transformed into the Black Belt Research and Experimentation Center. Auburn University used the lands that were filled with toxins to study how to manage fungus-infected pesticides and helped contribute to her beef production in the US. This area is used by students at Auburn for research but also is open for visitors to see the progression of farming in the Black Belt.

The Tuskegee Institution National Historic Site: Carver Museum pays homage to Booker T. Washington and George Washington Carver. Each of these men worked to reform the agriculture system that was negatively transformed by discrimination and racism. When the African Americans were pushed out of their rightful land, the Tuskegee Institute was founded by Washington in 1881. This institution helped to educate African Americans about how to farm, their legal land rights, and the financial managerial aspect of farming.

The Carver Museum honors the professor and activist who worked tirelessly to transform Southern agriculture. The museum holds original photographs, physical objects that were used during the time, and live reenactments.

In 1939, the U.S. government let African Americans train to be airmen in the U.S. military. Civil pilot training was enacted and took place at the Tuskegee Institute. The men learned how to fly and navigate a plane, combat weather, and climate issues, and engineer the plans. When the U.S. had entered World War II, the airmen began to report for duty. Now termed the "Tuskegee Experiment", 992 pilots and 10,000 people of staff had more to fight against than the white airmen who were trained to fight the enemy overseas. The black airmen who had parallel trading to the white airmen had to suffer through the racist climate in the South and the segregation in the U.S. surrounding them.

To honor this in 1998, President Bill Clinton passed a law that instituted the Tuskegee Airmen National Historic Site at Norton Field.

== See also ==
- African-American history of agriculture in the United States
- African-American self-determination
- Black mecca
- Black Southerners
- Deep South
- History of the Southern United States
- List of belt regions of the United States
- New South
- Republic of New Afrika
- Southern United States
- Tenant farmers in the US
