= National Movement for the Establishment of a 49th State =

US civil rights movement for a southern state

The National Movement for the Establishment of the 49th State was an intellectual movement popular among African-American separatists during the 1930s. The movement sought to create a state for African Americans in the American South. The movement was led by Oscar Brown, Sr., a civil rights activist from Chicago, Illinois.

== Leadership ==
The principal advocate for the movement was Oscar Brown, Sr. (father of Oscar Brown, Jr. who was a popular entertainer.) Brown lived a varied life in Chicago, Illinois. Brown was the son of a former slave, born in 1895 and grew up in Edwards, Mississippi. During World War I, he served as a lieutenant in France, returning to graduate from Howard University with a degree in law. He then began his work as an activist by starting a student branch of the NAACP. He moved to Chicago and used his law degree to start a law firm called Brown, Brown, Cyrus, and Green, before shifting his interests to real estate. It was during this time that he focused his energy on starting the Movement to Establish a 49th State. He led a group of fellow separatists in Chicago. He wanted descendants of slaves like himself to have a place where they could build their own economy without the detriments of being an ex-slave in the white-dominated world.

== Purpose ==
The main purpose of the National Movement for the Establishment of the 49th state was to create a separate state for African American people. The beginning of the movement saw Oscar Brown seeking the establishment of a state in the union territories. The state was to be populated and governed by African American people. The primary goal of statehood was to ensure that the benefits of the New Deal were fairly allocated to African American citizens. The organization gradually declined due to the lack of support, and the other outside federal forces prohibiting the creation of the 49th State. Later, Alaska would become the 49th state.

== History ==
The National Movement for the Establishment of the 49th state took place in the 1930s. During this time in the United States, Southern segregation and Northern economic deprivation were prevalent in the United States. The movement was originally based in Chicago, Illinois. Later there were several smaller campaigns held by African American groups all over the country. In 1931, campaigns were held in Chicago, and the states of Virginia, California, New York, Ohio, and Florida.

== Process ==
"In order to prepare the Negro for the responsibilities of the proper functioning of the new state, and to better equip those who would live elsewhere to survive, there shall be created in the Negro a new state of mind, of hope and confidence in himself, tying our folk together in their sympathies, thoughts, and actions." In 1934, the organization, headquartered in Chicago, posed to America the challenge of creating a new state within the federal union to be governed and populated exclusively by blacks. The creation of a forty-ninth state would be "an opportunity for the nation to reduce its debt to the Negro for past exploitation."

The goal of the new state was to be in the union, not in isolation or hostility, shutting down opportunities of travel and growth, not a separate nation but in the same vein of any other of the 48 states before it. The African Americans were to be shown that some problems are self-inflicted sometimes as a byproduct of self-hate and self-doubt, but most of their problems are caused because they are black and the system is rigged against them. The 49th State was to be a place where "the millions of black folk could be free to till the fields and get the benefit of their toil; where they could find and keep jobs in industry and commerce, in transportation and other utilities, in the building trades, in editing daily newspapers, where, in all the affairs in our civilized life, Negro women and men could advance as far as their abilities permit. Nor do we dream of a Utopia, where all of man's struggles would be brushed aside, as if by magic."

Despite the proposed idea for reparations, African Americans did not succeed in obtaining statehood. The Movement, which never made headway outside Chicago, died within three years. "Like a lot of good ideas, it failed because of a lack of funds," reminisces Brown. "We just couldn't communicate the idea well enough". For the remainder of the decade, the fires of separatism burned, mostly as a product of black involvement in the Communist Party."

== See also ==
- New Afrika
