= Oscar Brown Sr. =

American lawyer

- Born: Oscar Cicero Brown; December 22, 1895 nr. Camden, Arkansas, US
- Died: October 1, 1990 (aged 94); Chicago, Illinois, US
- Education: Howard University (BA, LLB)
- Occupations: Businessman; lawyer
- Known for: Civil rights activist, early proponent of black separatism, first African American on real estate planning committee for State of Illinois

Oscar Brown Sr. (December 22, 1895 – October 1, 1990) was a prominent Chicago businessman, lawyer and community activist. He was the father of Oscar Brown Jr.

== Biography ==
Oscar Cicero Brown was born near Camden, Arkansas, on December 22, 1895. In 1916, he graduated from Howard University in Washington, D.C., with degrees in commerce and law. He served in the military during World War I.

In 1929, he founded the law firm of Brown, Brown, Cyrus and Green in Chicago. Gradually, he turned his attention away from law and started the Oscar C. Brown Real Estate Corp. and spent a good part of his life on issues relating to real estate, either as a developer, an activist or as an administrator.

In the mid-1930s, disillusioned with the progress of racial integration, Brown seriously considered the concept of separatism. He led a group of African-American intellectuals to initiate the National Movement for the Establishment of a 49th State (there were only 48 United States at the time). He wanted to make a state for only African Americans.

In 1944, Brown served as president of the Chicago branch of the NAACP. A major focus of his efforts there were to protest housing segregation and to improve police enforcement in predominantly African-American neighborhoods. He became the first African American appointed to the real estate planning committee of the Illinois Department of Registration and Education in 1964. Brown was also a member of Alpha Phi Alpha fraternity.

He died at the University of Chicago Hospital on October 1, 1990, after a lengthy illness.

== Personal ==
Entertainer and activist Oscar Brown Jr. is his son. He is also the brother of William H. Brown, who was a prominent attorney based in Chicago.
