= Sponsor (legislative) =

Person who presents a bill to a legislature for deliberation

A sponsor or patron is a person, usually a legislator, who presents a bill or resolution to a legislature for consideration. Those who support it are known as cosponsors (sometimes co-sponsors) or copatrons.

== U.S. Congress ==
A sponsor in the United States Congress is the first member of the House or Senate to be listed among the potentially numerous lawmakers who introduce a bill for consideration. Committees are occasionally identified as sponsors of legislation as well. A sponsor is also sometimes called a "primary sponsor."

In contrast to a sponsor, a "cosponsor" is a senator or representative who adds their name as a supporter to the sponsor's bill. An "initial cosponsor" or "original cosponsor" is a senator or representative who was listed as a cosponsor at the time of a bill's introduction, rather than added as a cosponsor later on. A cosponsor added later is known as an "additional cosponsor".

An unlimited number of cosponsors of a bill is permitted. Some bills have hundreds of cosponsors.
