= February 20 =

February 20 this year in various calendars
- Friday, 20 February 2026
Akan	Kwafie
Armenian	5 Areg 1475
Aztec	Tecuilhuitontli 1, 3 Ātl
Babylonian	2 Shabatu, 2336 SE
Balinese pawukon	Luang, Pepet, Beteng, Sri, Pon, Was, Sukra of Parangbakat, Ludra, Jangur, Duka
Bengali	7 Falgun, BS 1432
Chinese	Yin Wood Ox・Bond Mansion; Fire Horse Year, Month 1, Day 4 (Yushui, 13 days until Jingzhe)
Common Era	20 February 2026 CE
Coptic	13 Meshir, AM 1742
Egyptian	10 Epiphi, 2774 NE
Ethiopian	13 Yakātit, 2018 Amätä Məhrät
French Republican	Décade I, Duodi de Ventôse de l'Année 234 de la République
Gregorian	20 February, AD 2026
Hebrew	3 Adar, AM 5786
Hindu	Uttarabhādrapada・Sādhya; Solar: 8 Phālguna, 1947 SE; Lunisolar: Tr̥tīyā, Śukla pakṣa of Phālguna, 2082 VE; Rāudra・5126 KY・1,872,626
Icelandic	Föstudagur, 29 Þorri 2025
Islamic	3 Ramadan, AH 1447 (using tabular method)
ISO week date	2026-W08-5
Japanese	4 Mutsuki, Reiwa 8 (Usui, 13 days until Keichitsu)
Julian	7 February, AD 2026 (AM 7534)
Julian day	2461092
Korean	4 Horangidal, 4359 DE
Maya	13.0.13.6.9; 7 Kayab, 3 Muluc
Roman	ante diem VII Idus Februarias, MMDCCLXXIX AUC
Solar Hijri	1 Esfand, SH 1404
Tibetan	3 mchu, me pho rta 2153 or 1772 or 1000

<<	February					>>
Su	Mo	Tu	We	Th	Fr	Sa
1	2	3	4	5	6	7
8	9	10	11	12	13	14
15	16	17	18	19	20	21
22	23	24	25	26	27	28
2026

February 20 in recent years
2026 (Friday)
2025 (Thursday)
2024 (Tuesday)
2023 (Monday)
2022 (Sunday)
2021 (Saturday)
2020 (Thursday)
2019 (Wednesday)
2018 (Tuesday)
2017 (Monday)

February 20 is the 51st day of the year in the Gregorian calendar; 314 days remain until the end of the year (315 in leap years).

== Events ==
=== Pre-1600 ===
- 1339 – The Milanese army and the St. George's (San Giorgio) Mercenaries of Lodrisio Visconti clash in the Battle of Parabiago; Visconti is defeated.
- 1472 – Orkney and Shetland are pawned by Norway to Scotland in lieu of a dowry for Margaret of Denmark.
- 1521 – Spanish conquistador Juan Ponce de León sets out from San Juan, Puerto Rico, for Florida with about 200 prospective colonists.
- 1547 – Edward VI is crowned King of England at Westminster Abbey.
- 1553 – Yohannan Sulaqa professes his Catholic belief and is ordained as bishop shortly after; this marks the beginning of the Chaldean Catholic Church.

=== 1601–1900 ===
- 1685 – René-Robert Cavelier establishes Fort St. Louis at Matagorda Bay thus forming the basis for France's claim to Texas.
- 1792 – The Postal Service Act, establishing the United States Post Office Department, is signed by United States President George Washington.
- 1798 – Louis-Alexandre Berthier removes Pope Pius VI from power.
- 1813 – Manuel Belgrano defeats the royalist army of Pío de Tristán during the Battle of Salta.
- 1816 – Gioachino Rossini's opera The Barber of Seville premieres at the Teatro Argentina in Rome.
- 1824 – William Buckland formally announces the name Megalosaurus, the first scientifically validly named non-avian dinosaur species.
- 1835 – The 1835 Concepción earthquake destroys Concepción, Chile.
- 1846 – Polish insurgents lead an uprising in Kraków to incite a fight for national independence.
- 1856 – Packet ship John Rutledge strikes an iceberg and sinks a few hours later. Only one survivor is subsequently rescued out of around 150 people aboard.
- 1864 – American Civil War: Battle of Olustee: The largest battle fought in Florida during the war.
- 1865 – End of the Uruguayan War, with a peace agreement between President Tomás Villalba and rebel leader Venancio Flores, setting the scene for the destructive War of the Triple Alliance.
- 1872 – The Metropolitan Museum of Art opens in New York City.
- 1877 – Tchaikovsky's ballet Swan Lake receives its premiere at the Bolshoi Theatre in Moscow.
- 1894 – 20 February bombings by Désiré Pauwels during the Ère des attentats (1892-1894).

=== 1901–present ===
- 1901 – The legislature of Hawaii Territory convenes for the first time.
- 1905 – The U.S. Supreme Court upholds the constitutionality of Massachusetts's mandatory smallpox vaccination program in Jacobson v. Massachusetts.
- 1909 – Publication of the Futurist Manifesto in the French journal Le Figaro.
- 1913 – King O'Malley drives in the first survey peg to mark commencement of work on the construction of Canberra.
- 1920 – An earthquake kills between 114 and 130 in Georgia and heavily damages the town of Gori.
- 1931 – The U.S. Congress approves the construction of the San Francisco–Oakland Bay Bridge by the state of California.
- 1931 – An anarchist uprising in Encarnación, Paraguay briefly transforms the city into a revolutionary commune.
- 1933 – The U.S. Congress approves the Blaine Act to repeal federal Prohibition in the United States, sending the Twenty-first Amendment to the United States Constitution to state ratifying conventions for approval.
- 1933 – Adolf Hitler secretly meets with German industrialists to arrange for financing of the Nazi Party's upcoming election campaign.
- 1935 – Caroline Mikkelsen becomes the first woman to set foot in Antarctica.
- 1939 – Madison Square Garden Nazi rally: The largest ever pro-Nazi rally in United States history is convened in Madison Square Garden, New York City, with 20,000 members and sympathizers of the German American Bund present.
- 1942 – World War II: Lieutenant Edward O'Hare becomes America's first World War II flying ace.
- 1943 – World War II: American movie studio executives agree to allow the Office of War Information to censor movies.
- 1943 – The Saturday Evening Post publishes the first of Norman Rockwell's Four Freedoms in support of United States President Franklin Roosevelt's 1941 State of the Union address theme of Four Freedoms.
- 1944 – World War II: The "Big Week" begins with American bomber raids on German aircraft manufacturing centers.
- 1944 – World War II: The United States takes Eniwetok Atoll.
- 1952 – Emmett Ashford becomes the first African-American umpire in organized baseball by being authorized to be a substitute umpire in the Southwestern International League.
- 1956 – The United States Merchant Marine Academy becomes a permanent Service Academy.
- 1959 – The Avro Arrow program to design and manufacture supersonic jet fighters in Canada is cancelled by the Diefenbaker government amid much political debate.
- 1962 – Mercury program: While aboard Friendship 7, John Glenn becomes the first American to orbit the Earth, making three orbits in four hours, 55 minutes.
- 1965 – Ranger 8 crashes into the Moon after a successful mission of photographing possible landing sites for the Apollo program astronauts.
- 1968 – The China Academy of Space Technology, China's main arm for the research, development, and creation of space satellites, is established in Beijing.
- 1971 – The United States Emergency Broadcast System is accidentally activated in an erroneous national alert.
- 1979 – An earthquake cracks open the Sinila volcanic crater on the Dieng Plateau, releasing poisonous H_{2}S gas and killing 149 villagers in the Indonesian province of Central Java.
- 1986 – The Soviet Union launches its Mir spacecraft. Remaining in orbit for 15 years, it is occupied for ten of those years.
- 1988 – The Nagorno-Karabakh Autonomous Oblast votes to secede from Azerbaijan and join Armenia, triggering the First Nagorno-Karabakh War.
- 1991 – In the Albanian capital Tirana, a gigantic statue of Albania's long-time leader, Enver Hoxha, is brought down by mobs of angry protesters.
- 1998 – American figure skater Tara Lipinski, at the age of 15, becomes the youngest Olympic figure skating gold-medalist at the 1998 Winter Olympics in Nagano, Japan.
- 2002 – A cooking gas cylinder explodes on board an Egyptian National Railways train in El Ayyat, causing a fire and killing over 370 people.
- 2003 – During a Great White concert in West Warwick, Rhode Island, a pyrotechnics display sets the Station nightclub ablaze, killing 100 and injuring over 200 others.
- 2005 – Spain becomes the first country to vote in a referendum on ratification of the proposed Constitution of the European Union, passing it by a substantial margin, but on a low turnout.
- 2009 – Two Tamil Tigers aircraft packed with C4 explosives en route to the national airforce headquarters are shot down by the Sri Lankan military before reaching their target, in a kamikaze style attack.
- 2010 – In Madeira Island, Portugal, heavy rain causes floods and mudslides, resulting in at least 43 deaths, in the worst disaster in the history of the archipelago.
- 2014 – Dozens of Euromaidan anti-government protesters die in Ukraine's capital Kyiv, many reportedly killed by snipers.
- 2015 – Two trains collide in the Swiss town of Rafz resulting in as many as 49 people injured and Swiss Federal Railways cancelling some services.
- 2016 – Six people are killed and two injured in multiple shooting incidents in Kalamazoo County, Michigan.

== Births ==
=== Pre-1600 ===
- 1358 – Eleanor of Aragon, queen of John I of Castile (died 1382)
- 1469 – Thomas Cajetan, Italian philosopher (died 1534)
- 1523 – Jan Blahoslav, Czech writer (died 1571)
- 1549 – Francesco Maria II della Rovere, last Duke of Urbino (died 1631)
- 1552 – Sengoku Hidehisa, Daimyō (died 1614)

=== 1601–1900 ===
- 1608 – Arthur Capell, 1st Baron Capell of Hadham, English politician (died 1649)
- 1631 – Thomas Osborne, 1st Duke of Leeds, English politician, Treasurer of the Navy (died 1712)
- 1633 – Jan de Baen, Dutch painter (died 1702)
- 1705 – Nicolas Chédeville, French musette player and composer (died 1782)
- 1726 – William Prescott, American colonel (died 1795)
- 1744 – William Cornwallis, English admiral and politician (died 1819)
- 1745 – Henry James Pye, English poet and politician (died 1813)
- 1748 – Luther Martin, American politician (died 1826)
- 1751 – Johann Heinrich Voss, German poet, translator, and academic (died 1826)
- 1753 – Louis-Alexandre Berthier, French general and politician, French Minister of Defence (died 1815)
- 1756 – Angelica Schuyler Church, American socialite, sister-in-law to Alexander Hamilton (died 1814)
- 1759 – Johann Christian Reil, German physician, physiologist, and anatomist (died 1813)
- 1774 – Vicente Sebastián Pintado, Spanish cartographer, engineer, military officer and land surveyor of Spanish Louisiana and Spanish West Florida (died 1829)
- 1784 – Judith Montefiore, British linguist, travel writer, philanthropist (died 1862)
- 1792 – Eliza Courtney, French daughter of Georgiana, Duchess of Devonshire (died 1859)
- 1794 – William Carleton, Irish author (died 1869)
- 1802 – Charles Auguste de Bériot, Belgian violinist and composer (died 1870)
- 1819 – Alfred Escher, Swiss businessman and politician (died 1882)
- 1839 – Benjamin Waugh, English activist, founded the NSPCC (died 1908)
- 1844 – Ludwig Boltzmann, Austrian physicist and philosopher (died 1906)
- 1844 – Joshua Slocum, Canadian sailor and adventurer (died 1909)
- 1848 – E. H. Harriman, American businessman and philanthropist (died 1909)
- 1857 – A. P. Lucas, English cricketer (died 1923)
- 1866 – Carl Westman, Swedish architect, designed the Stockholm Court House and Röhsska Museum (died 1936)
- 1867 – Louise, Princess Royal of England (died 1931)
- 1870 – Jay Johnson Morrow, American engineer and politician, 3rd Governor of the Panama Canal Zone (died 1937)
- 1874 – Mary Garden, Scottish-American soprano and actress (died 1967)
- 1879 – Hod Stuart, Canadian ice hockey player (died 1907)
- 1880 – Jacques d'Adelswärd-Fersen, French author and poet (died 1923)
- 1882 – Elie Nadelman, Polish-American sculptor (died 1946)
- 1887 – Vincent Massey, Canadian lawyer and politician, 18th Governor General of Canada (died 1967)
- 1888 – Georges Bernanos, French soldier and author (died 1948)
- 1889 – Hulusi Behçet, Turkish dermatologist and physician (died 1948)
- 1893 – Elizabeth Holloway Marston, American psychologist and author (died 1993)
- 1895 – Louis Zborowski, English race car driver and engineer (died 1924)
- 1897 – Ivan Albright, American painter (died 1983)
- 1898 – Ante Ciliga, Croatian politician, writer and publisher (died 1992)
- 1899 – Cornelius Vanderbilt Whitney, American businessman and philanthropist (died 1992)

=== 1901–present ===
- 1901 – René Dubos, French-American biologist and author (died 1982)
- 1901 – Muhammad Naguib, Egyptian general and politician, 1st President of Egypt (died 1984)
- 1901 – Ramakrishna Ranga Rao of Bobbili, Indian lawyer and politician, 6th Chief Minister of Madras Presidency (died 1978)
- 1906 – Gale Gordon, American actor (died 1995)
- 1912 – Pierre Boulle, French soldier and author (died 1994)
- 1912 – Johnny Checketts, New Zealand flying ace of the Second World War (died 2006)
- 1913 – Tommy Henrich, American baseball player and sportscaster (died 2009)
- 1914 – John Charles Daly, South African–American journalist and game show host (died 1991)
- 1916 – Jean Erdman, American dancer and choreographer (died 2020)
- 1918 – Leonore Annenberg, American businesswoman and diplomat (died 2009)
- 1919 – James O'Meara, English soldier and pilot (died 1974)
- 1920 – Karl Albrecht, German businessman, co-founded Aldi (died 2014)
- 1921 – Buddy Rogers, American wrestler (died 1992)
- 1923 – Victor G. Atiyeh, American businessman and politician, 32nd Governor of Oregon (died 2014)
- 1923 – Forbes Burnham, Guyanese lawyer and politician, 2nd President of Guyana (died 1985)
- 1923 – Rena Vlahopoulou, Greek actress (died 2004)
- 1925 – Robert Altman, American director and screenwriter (died 2006)
- 1925 – Tochinishiki Kiyotaka, Japanese sumo wrestler, the 44th Yokozuna (died 1990)
- 1926 – Matthew Bucksbaum, American businessman and philanthropist, co-founded General Growth Properties (died 2013)
- 1926 – Gillian Lynne, English ballerina, choreographer, and director (died 2018)
- 1926 – Richard Matheson, American author and screenwriter (died 2013)
- 1926 – Bob Richards, American Olympic track and field athlete (died 2023)
- 1926 – María de la Purísima Salvat Romero, Spanish Roman Catholic nun; later canonized (died 1998)
- 1927 – Roy Cohn, American lawyer and political activist (died 1986)
- 1927 – Ibrahim Ferrer, Cuban singer and musician (died 2005)
- 1927 – Sidney Poitier, Bahamian-American actor, director, and diplomat (died 2022)
- 1928 – Jean Kennedy Smith, American diplomat, 25th United States Ambassador to Ireland (died 2020)
- 1929 – Amanda Blake, American actress (died 1989)
- 1931 – John Milnor, American mathematician and academic
- 1932 – Adrian Cristobal, Filipino journalist and author (died 2007)
- 1935 – Ellen Gilchrist, American novelist, short story writer, and poet (died 2024)
- 1936 – Marj Dusay, American actress (died 2020)
- 1936 – Larry Hovis, American actor and singer (died 2003)
- 1936 – Shigeo Nagashima, Japanese baseball player and manager (died 2025)
- 1937 – Robert Huber, German biochemist and academic, Nobel Prize laureate
- 1939 – Herbert Kohler Jr., American businessman (died 2022)
- 1940 – Jimmy Greaves, English footballer and TV pundit (died 2021)
- 1941 – Lim Kit Siang, Malaysian lawyer and politician
- 1941 – Buffy Sainte-Marie, Canadian singer-songwriter and producer
- 1943 – Antonio Inoki, Japanese wrestler, mixed martial artist, and politician (died 2022)
- 1944 – Robert de Cotret, Canadian economist and politician, 56th Secretary of State for Canada (died 1999)
- 1944 – Lew Soloff, American trumpet player, composer, and actor (died 2015)
- 1944 – Willem van Hanegem, Dutch footballer and coach
- 1945 – Alan Hull, English singer-songwriter and guitarist (died 1995)
- 1945 – George Smoot, American astrophysicist and cosmologist, shared the 2006 Nobel Prize in Physics (died 2025)
- 1946 – J. Geils, American singer-songwriter and guitarist (died 2017)
- 1947 – Peter Osgood, English footballer (died 2006)
- 1948 – Pierre Bouchard, Canadian ice hockey player and sportscaster
- 1949 – Eddie Hemmings, English cricketer
- 1949 – Ivana Trump, Czech-American socialite and model (died 2022)
- 1950 – Walter Becker, American singer-songwriter, guitarist, and producer (died 2017)
- 1950 – Peter Marinello, Scottish footballer
- 1950 – Tony Wilson, English journalist and businessman (died 2007)
- 1951 – Edward Albert, American actor (died 2006)
- 1951 – Gordon Brown, Scottish politician, Prime Minister of the United Kingdom
- 1951 – Randy California, American singer-songwriter and guitarist (died 1997)
- 1951 – Phil Neal, English footballer and manager
- 1953 – Poison Ivy, American singer-songwriter, guitarist, and producer
- 1954 – Jon Brant, American bass player
- 1957 – Glen Hanlon, Canadian ice hockey player and coach
- 1959 – Scott Brayton, American race car driver (died 1996)
- 1959 – David Corn, American journalist and author
- 1959 – Bill Gullickson, American baseball player
- 1960 – Cándido Muatetema Rivas, Equatoguinean politician and diplomat, Prime Minister of Equatorial Guinea (died 2014)
- 1961 – Steve Lundquist, American swimmer
- 1962 – Dwayne McDuffie, American author, screenwriter, and producer, co-founded Milestone Media (died 2011)
- 1963 – Joakim Nystrom, Swedish tennis player
- 1963 – Mariliza Xenogiannakopoulou, Greek lawyer and politician, Greek Minister of Health
- 1963 – Cui Yongyuan, Chinese former anchor
- 1964 – Willie Garson, American actor and director (died 2021)
- 1964 – Tom Harris, Scottish journalist and politician
- 1964 – Jeff Maggert, American golfer
- 1967 – Paul Accola, Swiss alpine skier
- 1967 – Kurt Cobain, American musician (died 1994)
- 1967 – David Herman, American comedian and actor
- 1969 – Kjell Ove Hauge, Norwegian school principal and track and field athlete
- 1969 – Siniša Mihajlović, Serbian footballer and manager (died 2022)
- 1969 – Danis Tanović, Bosnian director and screenwriter
- 1971 – Jari Litmanen, Finnish footballer
- 1971 – Joost van der Westhuizen, South African rugby player (died 2017)
- 1974 – Karim Bagheri, Iranian footballer and manager
- 1975 – Liván Hernández, Cuban-American baseball player
- 1975 – Brian Littrell, American singer-songwriter and actor
- 1977 – Gail Kim, Canadian wrestler
- 1977 – Stephon Marbury, American basketball player
- 1980 – Imanol Harinordoquy, French rugby player
- 1980 – Luis Gabriel Rey, Colombian footballer
- 1980 – Artur Boruc, Polish footballer
- 1981 – Tony Hibbert, English footballer
- 1983 – Jose Morales, Puerto Rican baseball player
- 1983 – Justin Verlander, American baseball player
- 1984 – Brian McCann, American baseball player
- 1985 – Killian Dain, Northern Irish wrestler
- 1985 – Ryan Sweeney, American baseball player
- 1985 – Julia Volkova, Russian singer and actress
- 1986 – Julio Borbón, American baseball player
- 1987 – Luke Burgess, English rugby league player
- 1987 – Martin Hanzal, Czech ice hockey player
- 1987 – James Johnson, American basketball player
- 1987 – Miles Teller, American actor
- 1988 – Ki Bo-bae, South Korean archer
- 1988 – Rihanna, Barbadian singer, songwriter, businesswoman, and actress
- 1990 – Ciro Immobile, Italian footballer
- 1991 – Hidilyn Diaz, Filipino weightlifter
- 1991 – Angelique van der Meet, Dutch tennis player
- 1991 – Sally Rooney, Irish novelist
- 1993 – Jurickson Profar, Curaçaoan baseball player
- 1994 – Kateryna Baindl, Ukrainian tennis player
- 1994 – Luis Severino, Dominican baseball player
- 1995 – Elle Purrier St. Pierre, American track and field athlete
- 1996 – Clarke Schmidt, American baseball player
- 1998 – Emam Ashour, Egyptian footballer
- 1999 – Jarrett Culver, American basketball player
- 2000 – Josh Sargent, American soccer player
- 2002 – Gavin Bazunu, Irish footballer
- 2003 – Olivia Rodrigo, American actress and singer
- 2004 – Jared McCain, American basketball player

== Deaths ==
=== Pre-1600 ===
- 789 – Leo of Catania, saint and bishop of Catania (born 709)
- 922 – Theodora, Byzantine empress
- 1054 – Yaroslav the Wise, grand prince of Veliky Novgorod and Kyiv (born 978)
- 1154 – Saint Wulfric of Haselbury (born c. 1080)
- 1171 – Duke Conan IV of Brittany (born 1138)
- 1194 – Tancred, King of Sicily (born 1138)
- 1258 – Al-Musta'sim, Iraqi caliph (born 1213)
- 1408 – Henry Percy, 1st Earl of Northumberland, English politician, Earl Marshal of England (born 1341)
- 1431 – Pope Martin V (born 1368)
- 1458 – Lazar Branković, Despot of Serbia
- 1513 – King Hans (John) of Denmark, Norway, and Sweden (born 1455)
- 1524 – Tecun Uman, Mayan ruler (born 1500)
- 1579 – Nicholas Bacon, English politician (born 1509)

=== 1601–1900 ===
- 1618 – Philip William, Prince of Orange (born 1554)
- 1626 – John Dowland, English lute player and composer (born 1563)
- 1762 – Tobias Mayer, German astronomer and academic (born 1723)
- 1771 – Jean-Jacques d'Ortous de Mairan, French geophysicist and astronomer (born 1678)
- 1773 – Charles Emmanuel III, King of Sardinia (born 1701)
- 1778 – Laura Bassi, Italian physicist and scholar (born 1711)
- 1790 – Joseph II, Holy Roman Emperor (born 1741)
- 1806 – Lachlan McIntosh, Scottish-American general and politician (born 1725)
- 1810 – Andreas Hofer, Tyrolean rebel leader (born 1767)
- 1850 – Valentín Canalizo, Mexican general and politician. 14th President (1843–1844) (born 1794)
- 1862 – William Wallace Lincoln, American son of Abraham Lincoln (born 1850)
- 1871 – Paul Kane, Irish-Canadian painter (born 1810)
- 1893 – P. G. T. Beauregard, American general (born 1818)
- 1895 – Frederick Douglass, American author and activist (born c. 1818)
- 1900 – Washakie, American tribal leader (born 1798)

=== 1901–present ===
- 1907 – Henri Moissan, French chemist and academic, Nobel Prize laureate (born 1852)
- 1916 – Klas Pontus Arnoldson, Swedish journalist and politician, Nobel Prize laureate (born 1844)
- 1920 – Jacinta Marto, Portuguese saint (born 1910)
- 1920 – Robert Peary, American admiral and explorer (born 1856)
- 1933 – Takiji Kobayashi, Japanese writer (born 1903)
- 1936 – Max Schreck, German actor (born 1879)
- 1947 – Viktor Gutić, Croatian fascist official (born 1901)
- 1957 – Sadri Maksudi Arsal, Turkish scholar and politician (born 1878)
- 1961 – Percy Grainger, Australian-American pianist and composer (born 1882)
- 1963 – Jacob Gade, Danish violinist and composer (born 1879)
- 1965 – Michał Waszyński, Polish film director and producer (born 1904)
- 1966 – Chester W. Nimitz, American admiral (born 1885)
- 1968 – Anthony Asquith, English director and screenwriter (born 1902)
- 1969 – Ernest Ansermet, Swiss conductor (born 1883)
- 1972 – Maria Goeppert-Mayer, German-American physicist and academic, Nobel Prize laureate (born 1906)
- 1972 – Walter Winchell, American journalist and actor (born 1897)
- 1976 – René Cassin, French lawyer and judge, Nobel Prize laureate (born 1887)
- 1976 – Kathryn Kuhlman, healing evangelist, known for belief in Holy Spirit (born 1907)
- 1981 – Nicolas de Gunzburg, French-American banker and publisher (born 1904)
- 1987 – Wayne Boring, American illustrator (born 1905)
- 1992 – A. J. Casson, Canadian painter (born 1898)
- 1992 – Barbara Lüdemann, German politician (born 1922)
- 1992 – Dick York, American actor (born 1928)
- 1993 – Ferruccio Lamborghini, Italian businessman, founded Lamborghini (born 1916)
- 1993 – Ernest L. Massad, American general (born 1908)
- 1996 – Solomon Asch, American psychologist and academic (born 1907)
- 1996 – Audrey Munson, American model (born 1891)
- 1996 – Toru Takemitsu, Japanese pianist, guitarist, and composer (born 1930)
- 1999 – Sarah Kane, English playwright (born 1971)
- 1999 – Gene Siskel, American journalist and critic (born 1946)
- 2001 – Rosemary DeCamp, American actress (born 1910)
- 2001 – Donella Meadows, American environmentalist, author, and academic (born 1941)
- 2003 – Mushaf Ali Mir, Pakistani air marshal (born 1947)
- 2003 – Maurice Blanchot, French philosopher and author (born 1907)
- 2003 – Orville Freeman, American soldier, lawyer, and politician, 29th Governor of Minnesota (born 1918)
- 2005 – Sandra Dee, American actress (born 1942)
- 2005 – Josef Holeček, Czech canoeist (born 1921)
- 2005 – John Raitt, American actor and singer (born 1917)
- 2005 – Hunter S. Thompson, American journalist and author (born 1937)
- 2006 – Curt Gowdy, American sportscaster (born 1919)
- 2006 – Lucjan Wolanowski, Polish journalist and author (born 1920)
- 2008 – Emily Perry, English actress and dancer (born 1907)
- 2009 – Larry H. Miller, American businessman and philanthropist (born 1944)
- 2010 – Alexander Haig, American general and politician, 59th United States Secretary of State (born 1924)
- 2012 – Knut Torbjørn Eggen, Norwegian footballer and manager (born 1960)
- 2012 – Katie Hall, American educator and politician (born 1938)
- 2013 – Kenji Eno, Japanese game designer and composer (born 1970)
- 2013 – David S. McKay, American biochemist and geologist (born 1936)
- 2013 – Antonio Roma, Argentinian footballer (born 1932)
- 2014 – Rafael Addiego Bruno, Uruguayan jurist and politician, President of Uruguay (born 1923)
- 2014 – Walter D. Ehlers, American lieutenant, Medal of Honor recipient (born 1921)
- 2014 – Garrick Utley, American journalist (born 1939)
- 2015 – Govind Pansare, Indian author and activist (born 1933)
- 2015 – Henry Segerstrom, American businessman and philanthropist (born 1923)
- 2015 – John C. Willke, American physician, author, and activist (born 1925)
- 2016 – Fernando Cardenal, Nicaraguan priest and politician (born 1934)
- 2017 – Vitaly Churkin, Ambassador of the Russian Federation to the United Nations (born 1952)
- 2017 – Mildred Dresselhaus, American physicist (born 1930)
- 2017 – Steve Hewlett, British journalist (born 1958)
- 2020 – Joaquim Pina Moura, Portuguese Minister of Economy and Treasury and MP (born 1952)
- 2021 – Nurul Haque Miah, Bangladeshi professor and writer (born 1944)
- 2021 – Mauro Bellugi, Italian footballer (born 1950)
- 2024 – Andreas Brehme, German footballer (born 1960)
- 2024 – Yoko Yamamoto, Japanese actress (born 1942)
- 2025 – David Boren, American lawyer and politician, 21st Governor of Oklahoma (born 1941)
- 2025 – Jerry Butler, American singer-songwriter and producer (born 1939)
- 2025 – Peter Jason, American actor (born 1944)

== Holidays and observances ==
- Christian feast day:
  - Eleutherius of Tournai
  - Eucherius of Orléans
  - Julia Rodzińska
  - Francisco Marto and Jacinta Marto
  - Frederick Douglass (Episcopal Church (USA))
  - Wulfric of Haselbury
  - February 20 (Eastern Orthodox liturgics)
- Day of Heavenly Hundred Heroes (Ukraine)
- World Day of Social Justice
