= Haselbury =

Haselbury may refer to:

- Haselbury Bridge, bridge in Somerset, England
- Haselbury (ward), ward in London, England
- Wulfric of Haselbury, English Saint

== See also ==
- Hazelbury Bryan, village in Dorset, UK
