= Church of St Michael and All Angels, Haselbury Plucknett =

Church in Somerset, England

Church of St Michael and All Angels
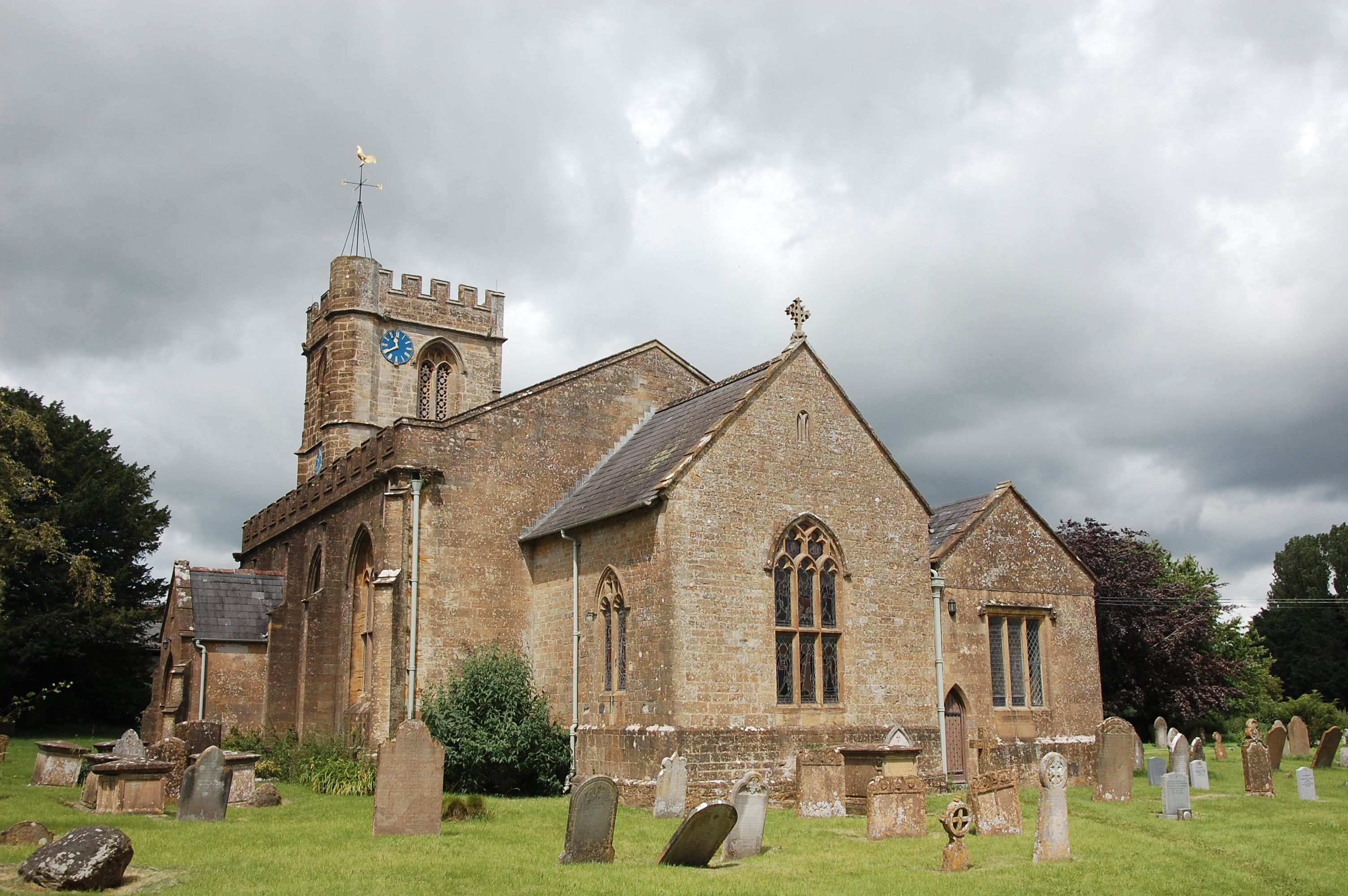

- Location within Somerset
- 50.8954°N 2.7530°W
- Location: Haselbury Plucknett, Somerset, England

History
- Built: 14th century

Listed Building – Grade II*
- Official name: Church of St Michael and All Angels
- Designated: 19 April 1961
- Reference no.: 1056149

The Anglican Church of St Michael and All Angels in Haselbury Plucknett, Somerset, England was built in the 14th century. It is a Grade II* listed building.

== History ==
The church was built in the 14th and 15th centuries with Victorian restoration in the 19th, which included rebuilding the chancel.

A prior church on the site was visited by Saint Wulfric in 1125. He wished to spend the rest of his life as an anchorite, withdrawn from the world, living in a cell adjacent to the church. This cell stood on the cold northern side of the chancel where the vestry is now. Although he apparently failed to obtain episcopal permission for this move, he was supported by the Cluniac monks at Montacute. Sir William FitzWalter had a great respect for his saintly neighbour; he sent provisions to him and visited him from time to time. Wulfric numbered among his intimate friends Osbern, the village priest; William, a lay brother of Forde Abbey; and Brichtric, who seems to have joined him as a disciple or attendant. According to Abbot John of Forde Abbey, Wulfric lived alone in these simple quarters for 29 years, devoting much of his time to reading the Bible and praying. In keeping with the ideals of medieval spirituality, he adopted stern ascetic practices: he deprived himself of sleep, ate a frugal meatless diet, spent hours reciting the psalms sitting in a bath of cold water, and wore a hair shirt and heavy chain-mail tunic.

The parish is part of the Wulfric benefice within the Diocese of Bath and Wells.

== Architecture ==
The stone building has slate roofs. It has a four-bay nave and single-bay chancel with a porch and vestry. The three-stage tower is supported by corner buttresses.

== See also ==
- List of ecclesiastical parishes in the Diocese of Bath and Wells
