= Blaine Act =

1933 U.S. Congress joint resolution to repeal the 18th Amendment and end Prohibition

Joint Resolution Proposing the Twenty-First Amendment to the United States Constitution
- Nicknames: Blaine Act
- Enacted by: the 72nd United States Congress
- Effective: February 20, 1933

Codification
- Acts repealed: Eighteenth Amendment to the United States Constitution

Legislative history
- Introduced in the Senate as S.J.Res. 211 by John J. Blaine (R-WI) on December 6, 1932; Committee consideration by Judiciary; Passed the Senate on February 17, 1933 (63-23); Passed the House on February 20, 1933 (289-121)

The Blaine Act, formally titled Joint Resolution Proposing the Twenty-First Amendment to the United States Constitution, is a joint resolution adopted by the United States Congress on February 20, 1933, initiating repeal of the 18th Amendment to the United States Constitution, which established Prohibition in the United States. Repeal was finalized when the 21st Amendment to the Constitution was ratified by the required minimum number of states on December 5, 1933.

== Initial activity in the 72nd Congress ==
The Volstead Act implemented the 18th Amendment (Prohibition). The act defined "intoxicating beverage" as one with 0.5 percent alcohol by weight. Numerous problems with enforcement and a desire to create jobs and raise tax revenue by legalizing beer, wine, and liquor led a majority of voters and members of Congress to turn against Prohibition by late 1932.

=== Political situation ===
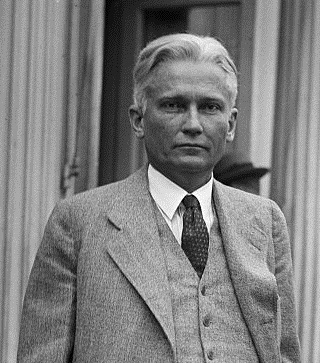
Senator Hiram Bingham

When the first legislative session of the 72nd United States Congress opened on December 7, 1931, more than two dozen bills were offered amending the Volstead Act or repealing the 18th Amendment altogether. Republicans, who controlled both houses in the previous Congress, had previously been united in their support for Prohibition and, with the support of "dry" (pro-Prohibition) Democrats, easily garnered more than the two-thirds majority needed to block any vote on even the slightest easing of the Volstead Act. Now, however, 64 "wet" Republicans formed a caucus in the House of Representatives to work with Democrats (who had a slim majority after winning a number of special elections) to seek modification or repeal. The Democrats also changed the rules of the House, adopting a discharge petition procedure which would force a bill to the floor for a vote if 145 members requested it.

Legislative activity initially focused on the Senate. Among the bills filed at the start of the session was one by Senator Hiram Bingham III (R-Conn.), which amended the Volstead Act to permit the manufacture of beer which was 4 percent alcohol by weight. His bill would not have modified the 18th Amendment. Republican "wets" were able to win a minor victory on December 23, 1931, when they secured an agreement establishing a subcommittee of the Senate Judiciary Committee which would hold hearings regarding modification of the Volstead Act and repeal of the 18th Amendment. Senator John J. Blaine (R-Wisc.), a leader of the Senate's Republican "wets", was named subcommittee chair. Although the five-member subcommittee had a three-member "dry" majority, "wets" only wanted to use the subcommittee to lay the groundwork for a vote (at some indeterminate future) on a Prohibition bill (of some undetermined type). "Wets" won another victory a few days later when the Senate Committee on Manufactures agreed to hold hearings on Bingham's 4 percent beer bill.

These small victories emboldened "wet" forces. On December 26, Senator Bingham submitted legislation to repeal the 18th Amendment. Three-fourths of the state legislatures were required to approve any amendment, and Bingham believed that too many legislatures still supported Prohibition. Bingham's bill therefore proposed submitting the amendment to the public via a national referendum or ratification by conventions specially elected by voters in each state. In the House, where "wet" forces were in somewhat disarray, Majority Leader Henry T. Rainey (D-Ill.) (a "dry" himself) tried to block legislation by telling "wets" that they would have a single opportunity for a vote. It didn't matter if the bill was modification or repeal, he said. In response, a bipartisan caucus of "wets" decided to submit a plan to modify the 18th Amendment according to the recommendations issued in 1931 by the National Commission on Law Observance and Enforcement (the Wickersham Commission), a panel established by President Herbert Hoover to study law enforcement problems under Prohibition.

In the first direct vote on the issue since Prohibition began, the Senate rejected the Bingham repeal resolution, 55 to 15, on January 21, 1932. "Drys" hailed the vote as symbolic of the weakness of the repeal forces.

=== Wavering support for changing Prohibition ===
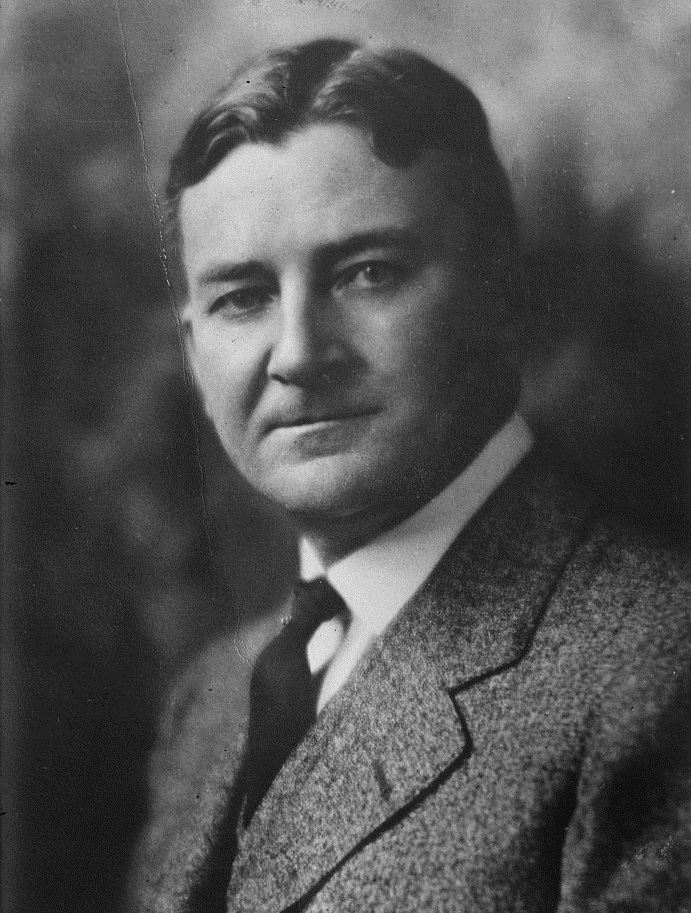
Senator John J. Blaine. A "wet" Republican, he was elected chair of a Judiciary Committee subcomittee, which he used to promote the modification or repeal of Prohibition and its enabling legislation.

"Wets" in Congress perceived that support for Prohibition was waning. A week after the defeat of the Bingham repeal proposal, House "wets" began drafting legislation to amend the Volstead Act to permit the manufacture of beer once more. Their goal was to force a vote before the session of Congress ended in July 1932. With only 34 "wet" votes in the Senate and 190 in the House, (Note: The U.S. Constitution requires that two-thirds of members present in both the Senate and the House of Representatives vote in favor of an amendment before it can be sent to the states for repeal. At the time, if all members were present and voting, the two-thirds majority required 64 votes in the 96-seat Senate and 282 votes in the 435-seat House.) repeal lobbyists believed no action could be taken until after the November 1932 elections.

Congressional "wets" received a major boost on February 20 when a leading Democratic candidate for president, Franklin D. Roosevelt, announced he supported repeal of the 18th Amendment as a means of generating tax revenues for the federal government and states. Roosevelt's support for repeal boosted "wet" support in the House. On February 16, the House Judiciary Committee had voted 14-to-9 against the Beck-Linthicum resolution, which would have asked state legislatures to reaffirm or repeal the 18th Amendment. House "wets" then shocked political leaders in both sides on February 25 by obtaining 110 signatures on a discharge petition for the Beck-Linthicum resolution. The "wets" secured the required 145 signatures for discharge on March 1. The Beck-Linthicum resolution received 187 votes, resulting in the smallest majority "drys" had managed to muster since the start of Prohibition. House "wets", who considered the vote on Beck-Linthicum only a test of their growing strength, were thrilled by the vote.

The House test vote was encouraging to Senate "wets" as well. On March 19, Blaine's Judiciary subcommittee favorably reported a bill by Senator Bingham proposing the legalization of 4 percent beer. Surprisingly, the subcommittee report even called modification of the 18th Amendment useless. Three days later, a bipartisan group of 38 senators surprised the Senate by signing a letter demanding a vote to modify or repeal the 18th Amendment. The letter referred to four resolutions before Blaine's subcommittee. (Note: The four resolutions were: (1) A weakly-worded repeal resolution by Senator Bingham; (2) A weakly-worded repeal resolution by Senator Robert F. Wagner (D-N.Y.); (3) A resolution by Senator Millard Tydings (D-Md.) amending Prohibition to permit the states to adhere to it in whole or in part; and (4) A strongly-worded resolution, introduced by Senator Blaine on March 14, repealing the 18th Amendment.) Senator George W. Norris (R-Neb.), chair of the full Judiciary Committee, promised the group that his committee would report at least one of the bills (favorably or not), and give senators a chance to vote on it on the Senate floor.

House "wets" appeared to suffer a setback on March 25 when the House rejected a bill, proposed by Rep. Thomas H. Cullen (D-N.Y.), to amend the Volstead Act to permit the manufacture of 2.75 percent beer and tax it.

"Wets" in the Senate also lost ground. Blaine began holding hearings on repeal of the 18th Amendment in mid April, and on April 19 the Senate Manufactures Committee unfavorably reported a 4 percent beer bill which had the perverse outcome of enabling a floor vote. In this test vote, "wets" were able to secure only 24 votes.

In May 1932, House "wets" shocked the political establishment again by securing enough signatures on a discharge petition to free the O'Connor-Hull bill from the House Ways and Means Committee. The House defeated the bill, which would have permitted 2.75 percent beer and taxed it at a rate of 3 percent of its retail value, 228 to 169. It was a significant drop in anti-Prohibition support.

=== Election of 1932 and effect on Prohibition repeal ===
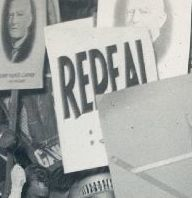
The 1932 Democratic National Convention called for complete repeal of the 18th Amendment, giving "wet" forces in Congress a major boost.

The political situation among voters in the various states was strongly in favor of Prohibition repeal, however. Although a majority of delegates to the 1932 Republican National Convention, held in Chicago June 14 to 16, were in favor of repealing the 18th Amendment, President Hoover was not. A compromise was reached in which the convention adopted a party platform plank which advocated amending Prohibition to permit states to follow the law in whole or in part (subject to federal control). The plank also rejected a national referendum in favor of approval/disapproval by state legislatures. The platform plan was widely criticized for not taking a stand on Prohibition. "Dry" organizations, however, backed Hoover strongly, seeing in him their only chance of preserving Prohibition in any form.

At the 1932 Democratic National Convention, held in Chicago from June 27 to July 2, an overwhelming majority supported a repeal of the 18th Amendment. The party's platform contained a plank proposing repeal by conventions specially elected by voters in each state (the Bingham proposal from earlier in the year). The plank also proposed allowing states and their localities to stay "dry" if they so chose. Franklin D. Roosevelt, the party's nominee for President of the United States, campaigned strongly in favor of repeal.

"Wets" of both parties in Congress were elated by the Democratic Party platform, and agreed, at a minimum, to seek significant amendment of the Volstead Act before the end of the 72nd Congress in March 1933. Senate "wets" were particularly encouraged after Senator Cameron A. Morrison (D-N.C.), a radical "dry", was defeated for reelection in the June 1932 Democratic primary and Senator Carter Glass (D-Va.), another strong "dry", abruptly began advocating repeal. However, when Senator Bingham attempted to move his repeal resolution forward, Senate leaders blocked the move. In the House, "wets" rushed to circulate discharge petitions on four bills which would make beer legal again.

By late fall, it was clear to many leaders in Congress that the "wet" movement already had majority support. Polls of candidates for Congress showed that at least 80 percent of them supported repeal of the 18th Amendment. Rep. John W. Summers (R-Wash.), "dry" chair of the House Judiciary Committee, now believed it was inevitable that the 18th Amendment would be resubmitted to the states. Speaker of the House John Nance Garner believed Congress would approve the sale of beer by the end of the session. Prominent "wets" in the Senate were less hopeful, as their forces were divided between supporting modification of the Volstead Act and outright repeal of the 18th Amendment.

On Election Day, more than 100 "dry" candidates lost their seats in Congress. In the House, a super-majority of new and reelected members supported outright repeal, while in the Senate the repeal super-majority was just three votes short. Two more repeal votes were gained when Senator Thomas J. Walsh (D-Mont.), a leading "dry", agreed to vote for modification or repeal on November 12, followed by Senator Arthur Vandenberg (R-Mich.) on November 18.

== Passage of the Blaine Act ==
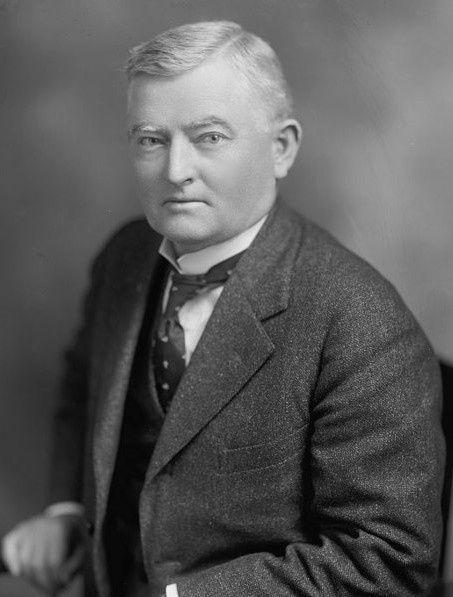
Speaker John Nance Garner attempted to force the House to repeal the 18th Amendment on the first day of the lame-duck second session. House members balked.

As the lame-duck session of Congress opened in November, House Majority Leader Rainey—bowing to the wishes of his caucus—announced that House leaders would move with all due speed on Prohibition changes. A survey of House members showed a strong majority for amending the Volstead Act to make beer legal again, with fewer in favor of a repeal of the 18th Amendment. Despite President Hoover's pledge to veto the legislation, Speaker Garner said he would clear all legislative calendars to give a "beer bill" priority before Congress was forced to adjourn. (Note: Garner was also Vice President-elect at this time.)

On December 6, Senator Blaine introduced Senate Joint Resolution 211, whose text amended and rewrote the 18th Amendment to read that Congress shall not have "the power to authorize the transportation or importation into any State or Territory of the United States for use therein of intoxicating liquors for beverage or other purposes within the State or Territory if the laws in force therein prohibit such transportation or importation". Alcohol imported into a prohibited area was subject to local (not federal) law, and Congress was authorized to enact legislation to aid states in enforcing their own liquor laws. (Note: There were three other joint resolutions in the lame-duck Congress to amend (H.J.Res. 485, H.J.Res. 491, and H.J.Res. 534), seven to repeal (S.J.Res. 202, H.J.Res. 480, H.J.Res. 484, H.J.Res. 489, H.J.Res. 490, H.J.Res. 508, and H.J.Res. 516), and one regarding implementation of the 18th Amendment (H.J .Res. 592). Only S.J.Res. 202, S.J.Res. 211, and H.J.Res. 480 were acted upon. During floor consideration of S.J.Res. 211, S.J.Res. 202 was offered as an amendment in the nature of a substitute and rejected.) (Note: Senator Sam G. Bratton (D-N.M.) offered an amendment to S.J.Res. 211 to provide for approval by state convention rather than state legislatures, but it was never acted on.)

=== Repeal failure in the House ===
The first attempt at repeal of the 18th Amendment came in the House. Speaker Garner (a "wet") surprised "wet" forces by announcing on November 23 that he himself had drafted a resolution (H.J.Res. 480) calling for repeal of the amendment and was prepared to suspend the rules of the House in order to get it passed. The Garner plan received a setback on December 2 when the House Judiciary Committee voted 13 to 6 to reject the resolution. Observers disputed whether the Garner resolution was flawed, or whether "drys" had decided to oppose it at last.

The House went into session again on December 5, and the Garner resolution went to the floor for a vote. Although Democratic Party whips had counted 275 votes in favor of repeal, the resolution failed to win the necessary two-thirds majority. The final vote was 272 to 144, with 79 former "drys" (66 Democrats and 13 Republicans) voting in favor of repeal. Angry and dejected, Garner proclaimed the issue "dead" for the remainder of the lame-duck session and said Congress would have to wait until the new "wet" majority took power in the 73rd Congress on March 4, 1933. (Note: Among those voting against repeal were 70 "dry" Republicans and 11 "dry" Democrats who had failed to win reelection.)

Rep. James M. Beck (R-Pa.), co-sponsor of the Beck-Linthicum bill (which had gone down to defeat nine months earlier), believed the House would have adopted Garner's resolution if he had not tried to force the issue on the first day of the lame-duck session.

=== The "beer bills" ===
The House leadership resigned itself to action on the "Collier bill", legislation sponsored by Rep. James Collier (D-Miss.) which would legalize 2.75 percent beer and wine and levy a $5 per barrel tax ($115 in 2024 dollars) on beer and a 20 percent retail sales tax on wine. On December 15, the Ways and Means Committee voted 17 to 7 in favor of this bill (which was amended to legalize 3.2 percent beer). The bill was amended to prohibit legal sales of wine, but attempts to include a ban on bars and saloons were beaten back. Although proposed amendments threatened to split "wet" ranks, the House passed the Collier bill on December 21 by a surprising large margin of 230 to 165. An amendment to the bill restricted shipments of beer into states which chose to retain Prohibition.

In the Senate, both "beer bills" and 18th Amendment repeal resolutions were pursued. Senator Tydings proposed legislation authorizing the sale of beer with any percentage of alcohol, and taxing beer at 16 percent of its retail value. Senator Bingham, however, sought passage of a measure identical to the original Collier bill. "Wets" in the Senate also sought to bring a repeal resolution to the floor as swiftly as possible. The Senate voted down, 48 to 23, an attempt on December 23 to bring the Bingham bill to the floor for debate and a vote. Senators pointed out that the bill did not actually amend the Volstead Act, but was stand-alone legislation. They feared that the Bingham-Collier bill would be found unconstitutional unless the Volstead Act itself were amended. Senator Blaine promised an immediate redraft to meet these concerns.

=== Moving the Blaine bill in the Senate ===
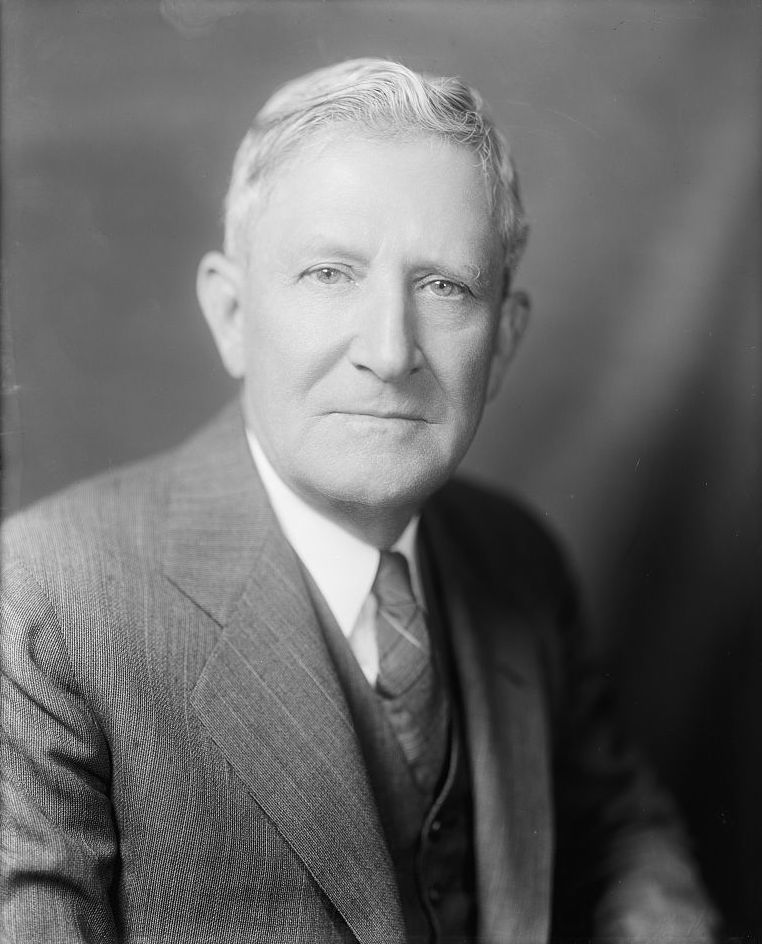
Senator Morris Sheppard of Texas led the eight-hour filibuster against the Blaine Act

On January 5, 1933, the Blaine subcommittee substantially amended S.J.Res. 211 during markup. Section one of the proposed constitutional amendment now explicitly repealed the 18th amendment. New language in section two prohibited the sale of intoxicating beverages in any state or territory which prohibited them, while section three gave Congress the concurrent power to regulate or prohibit the consumption of intoxicating beverages in certain establishments. (Note: This section was colloquially known as the "anti-saloon provision".) The final section provided for ratification by state legislatures, with a seven-year time limit. The new text was sharply criticized by repeal advocates, who saw the new ratification procedure as a breach of faith and who strongly objected to the concurrent federal power granted in section three.

The full Senate Judiciary Committee favorably reported S.J.Res. 211 on January 9 in an 11 to 5 vote.

Blaine moved to have the Senate consider S.J.Res. 211 on February 14. (Note: Senator Blaine attempted to begin debate on S.J.Res. 211 on the evening of February 13, but agreed to let the Senate recess for the night.) "Drys" in the Senate engaged in an eight-hour filibuster, led by Senators Morris Sheppard (D-Tex.) and Smith W. Brookhart (R-Iowa). Finally, frustrated by the filibuster's blockage of all Senate business (including emergency legislation to deal with the Great Depression's banking crisis), a successful cloture vote occurred at 10 P.M. which ended the filibuster.

During debate on the Blaine bill on February 15, the Senate made two substantive changes to the resolution. Senator Joseph T. Robinson (D-Ark.) offered an amendment in the form of a substitution to provide for ratification by state convention rather than state legislatures. The amendment was agreed to by a vote of 45 to 15. Senator Robinson then offered an amendment striking section two, but then modified his own motion to strike instead section three. The amendment was agreed to by a vote of 33 to 32. The Senate resumed debate on February 16. Senator David A. Reed (R-Pa.) asked for reconsideration of the vote to strike section three, and Senator Carter Glass attempted to offer S.J.Res. 202 as an amendment in the nature of a substitute. (Note: Senator Reed offered a friendly amendment to S.J.Res. 202, to which Glass agreed, clarifying the intent of the resolution.) Glass' motion was rejected by a vote of 14 to 70. Senator Tydings attempted to prevent Congress from taxing any intoxicating beverage it chose to prohibit, but his amendment was rejected in a voice vote. Glass attempted again to substitute S.J.Res. 202 (this time as an amendment), and was again rejected 38 to 46. Reed's amendment to restore section three was also rejected, by a vote of 37 to 47. Senator Thomas Gore (D-Okla.) attempted to amend section two to bar the sale of intoxicating beverages for private profit, but his motion was rejected by voice vote.

The Senate then approved the amended resolution by a vote of 63 to 23, five more votes than the required two-thirds majority.

=== Moving the Blaine bill in the House ===
Adoption of S.J.Res. 211 created new repeal activity in the House. Majority Leader Rainey called an immediate meeting of the Democratic caucus, and Speaker Garner said he intended to seek suspension of the rules in order to bring repeal to a quick vote and to bar any attempt to amend the resolution on the floor.

On February 20, Majority Leader Rainey asked for suspension of the rules and immediate adoption of S.J.Res. 211. Debate was limited to just 20 minutes pro and con. The House adopted Rainey's motion on a vote of 289 to 121. S.J.Res. 211 was passed with 15 more votes than the required two-thirds majority.

== Adoption of the 21st Amendment ==
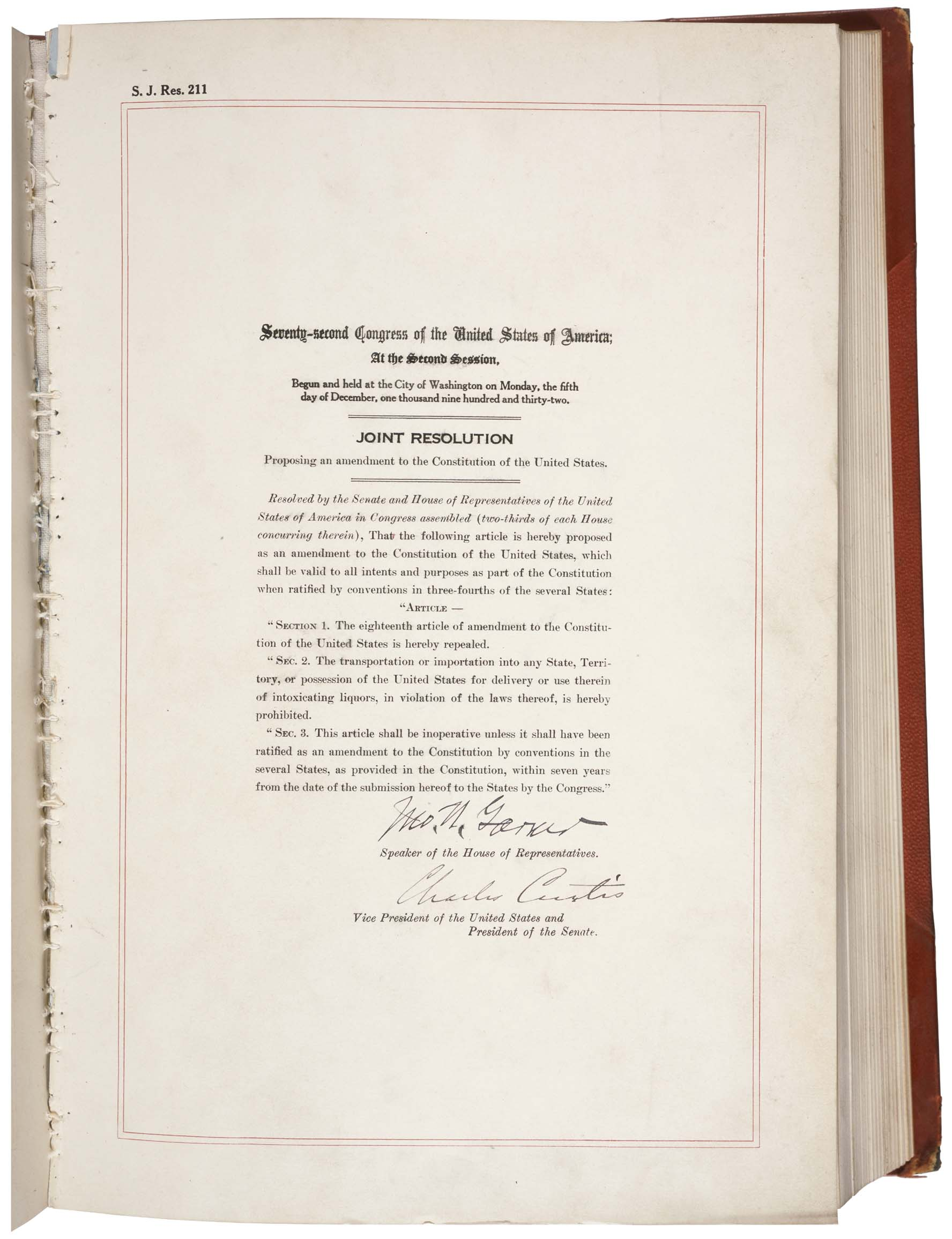
Enrolled text of the 21st Amendment

S.J.Res. 211 was sent to the United States Secretary of State on February 20, 1933.

On March 21, 1933, Congress enacted the Cullen-Harrison Act, which redefined "intoxicating beverage" as one with 3.2 percent alcohol by weight. The Cullen-Harrison Act went into effect on April 7, 1933.

The 21st Amendment was ratified by state ratifying conventions on December 5, 1933. A nationwide radio audience listened in as Utah became the 36th state to ratify the amendment.

== Bibliography ==
- Baker, Kimberly M. (2014). "Prohibition". In Forsyth, Craig J.; Copes, Heith (eds.). Encyclopedia of Social Deviance. Thousand Oaks, Calif.: SAGE Publications. ISBN 9781784026523.
- Bruce, William Cabell (1926). The National Prohibition Law: Hearings before the Subcommittee of the Committee on the Judiciary. Vol. 1. U.S. Senate. 69th Cong., 1st sess. Washington, D.C.: U.S. Government Printing Office. hdl:2027/mdp.39015071649391.
- Congressional Record (Bound). Volume 76, Part 1 (December 5, 1932 to December 30, 1932) (PDF). Washington, D.C.: U.S. Government Printing Office. 1933.
- Congressional Record (Bound). Volume 76, Part 2 (January 3, 1933 to January 23, 1933) (PDF). Washington, D.C.: U.S. Government Printing Office. 1933.
- Congressional Record (Bound). Volume 76, Part 4 (February 6, 1933 to February 20, 1933) (PDF). Washington, D.C.: U.S. Government Printing Office. 1933.
- Congressional Record (Bound). Volume 76, Part 5 (February 21, 1933 to March 4, 1933) (PDF). Washington, D.C.: U.S. Government Printing Office. 1933.
- Congressional Record (Bound). Volume 76, Part 6 (December 5, 1932 to March 4, 1933) (PDF). Washington, D.C.: U.S. Government Printing Office. 1933.
- Kyvig, David E. (2000). Repealing National Prohibition. Kent, Ohio: Kent State University Press. ISBN 9780873386722.
- LaFrance, Peter (2013). "Beer". In Smith, Andrew F. (ed.). The Oxford Encyclopedia of Food and Drink in America. New York: Oxford University Press. ISBN 9780199734962.
- McCarty, Jeanne Bozzell (1980). The Struggle for Sobriety: Protestants and Prohibition in Texas, 1919-1935. El Paso, Tex.: Texas Western Press. ISBN 9780874041217.
- Myers, Peter L.; Isralowitz, Richard (2011). Alcohol. Santa Barbara, Calif.: Greenwood Press. ISBN 9780313372476.
