= Gilbert of Hoyland =

English abbot

Gilbert of Hoyland (11??–1172?) (Gilbert of Hoyt) was a twelfth-century abbot of Swineshead Abbey, the Cistercian monastery in Lincolnshire, between about 1147 and his death in 1172. Swineshead had been a member of the monastic order of Savigny, which joined the Cistercian Order in 1147. Gilbert apparently went to Swineshead to help the community adopt Cistercian usages.

Gilbert's surviving works are formed of seven brief spiritual treatises, some letters, and 47 sermons commenting on Song of Songs 3.1-5.10. (Sermones in Canticum Salomonis)

Sometime after Bernard of Clairvaux died in 1153, Gilbert was asked to continue Bernard's incomplete series of 86 sermons on the biblical Song of Songs. Gilbert wrote 47 sermons before he died in 1172, probably at the French Cistercian monastery of Larrivour. Gilbert's 47 sermons ended in Chapter 5 of the Song of Songs; another English Cistercian abbot, John of Ford, wrote another 120 sermons on the Song of Songs, so completing the Cistercian sermon-commentary on the book. The sermons were fairly well-known, surviving in about fifty manuscripts.

== Modern editions ==
- Gilbert of Hoyland. Sermons on the Song of Songs, I–IV Trans. Lawrence C. Braceland. Cistercian Fathers series nos. 14, 20, 26. (Kalamazoo, MI: Cistercian Publications, 1978, 1979, 1981)
- Gilbert of Hoyland. Treatises, Sermons and Epistles: with Roger of Byland's The Milk of Babes Trans. Lawrence C. Braceland. Cistercian Fathers series no. 34. (Kalamazoo, MI: Cistercian Publications, 1980)
- "Sermones in Canticum Salomonis", "Tractatus Ascetici", Patrologia Latina. Ed. J.-P. Migne. 184:11–298.
- Gilbert of Hoyland's works have also been translated into French by Fr. Pierre-Yves Emery
- Marsha L. Dutton is completing the critical edition of Gilbert's works, to be published by Brepols Publishers in the Corpus Christianorum, Continuatio Mediaevalis series.
