= Haselbury Plucknett =

Village and civil parish in Somerset, England

Coordinates: 50.8915°N 2.7478°W

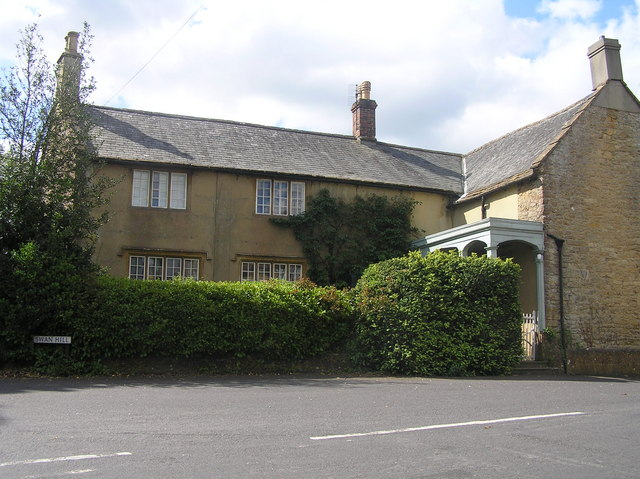
- Haselbury House

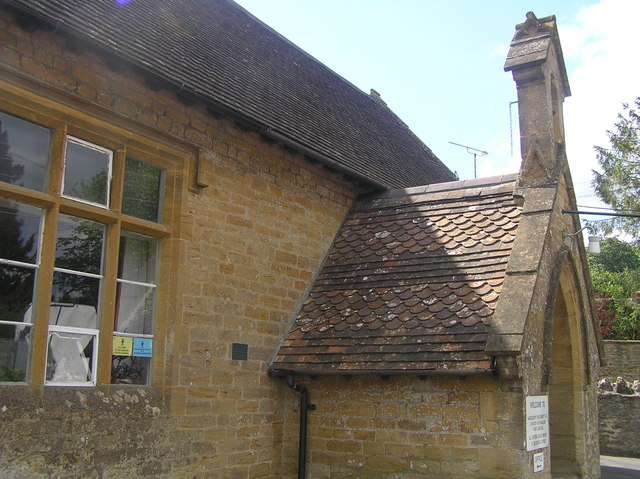
- Haselbury Plucknett first school

- Location within Somerset
- Population: 744 (2011)
- OS grid reference: ST475105
- Unitary authority: Somerset Council
- Ceremonial county: Somerset
- Region: South West
- Country: England
- Sovereign state: United Kingdom
- Post town: Crewkerne
- Postcode district: TA18
- Dialling code: 01460
- Police: Avon and Somerset
- Fire: Devon and Somerset
- Ambulance: South Western
- UK Parliament: Yeovil

Haselbury Plucknett is a village and civil parish on the River Parrett in Somerset, England, situated 6 miles (9.7 km) south west of Yeovil. The village has a population of 744.

It is the final resting place of 'Blessed' Wulfric, who was never formally canonised, and who died 20 February 1154.

The village has a small Church of England primary school (years foundation - 6). It did have a small village shop and post office, however this closed in September 2009. The only pub/restaurant in the village is The White Horse at Haselbury.

== History ==
The first part of the village name means a hazel grove, and the second part comes from the name of its medieval owners.

It was one of the few manors which retained its Saxon owner, Brismar, after the Norman Conquest. A later Lord of the manor, Richard of Haselbury, rebelled against King John and was hanged at Sherborne.

Saint Wulfric arrived in the village in 1125 and was visited by Henry I and other nobility. He died in 1154 and was buried in the east end of the north aisle of the church, which became known as St Wufric's aisle, but there is no trace in the current church.

The parish was part of the hundred of Houndsborough.

Haselbury Bridge (sometimes called Haslebury Old Bridge) is a stone-built bridge dating from the 14th century. It is a scheduled monument and Grade II* listed building. The two arch bridge was built of local Hamstone and carries a small road over the River Parrett. Each of the arches has a 3 metres (9.8 ft) span. The bridge is 4.1 metres (13 ft) wide including the parapet on each side. In the 17th century it carried the main route between Salisbury and Exeter and later marked the boundary between the Chard and Yeovil Turnpike trusts. The bridge was bypassed in 1831.

== Governance ==
The parish council has responsibility for local issues, including setting an annual precept (local rate) to cover the council's operating costs and producing annual accounts for public scrutiny. The parish council evaluates local planning applications and works with the local police, district council officers, and Neighbourhood Watch groups on matters of crime, security, and traffic. The parish council's role also includes initiating projects for the maintenance and repair of parish facilities, as well as consulting with the district council on the maintenance, repair, and improvement of highways, drainage, footpaths, public transport, and street cleaning. Conservation matters (including trees and listed buildings) and environmental issues are also the responsibility of the council.

For local government purposes, since 1 April 2023, the parish comes under the unitary authority of Somerset Council. Prior to this, it was part of the non-metropolitan district of South Somerset (established under the Local Government Act 1972). It was part of Yeovil Rural District before 1974.

It is also part of the Yeovil county constituency represented in the House of Commons of the Parliament of the United Kingdom, electing one Member of Parliament (MP) by the first past the post system of election.

== Notable residents ==
- William Best, 1st Baron Wynford (1767–1845), conservative politician and judge who served as Chief Justice of the Common Pleas from 1824 until 1829
- John Bryant (1944–2020), journalist and editor of The Daily Telegraph

== Religious sites ==
The Anglican parish Church of St Michael and All Angels dates from the 14th century.

The village has a small Protestant church. The nearby local primary school goes there to practise and perform their plays.

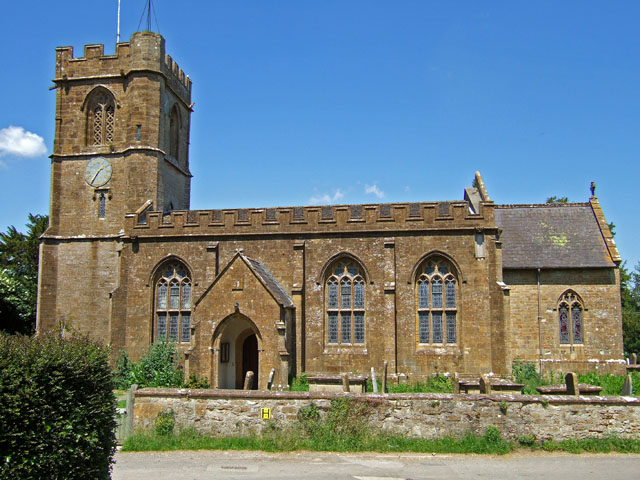
St Michael's Church - Haselbury Plucknett

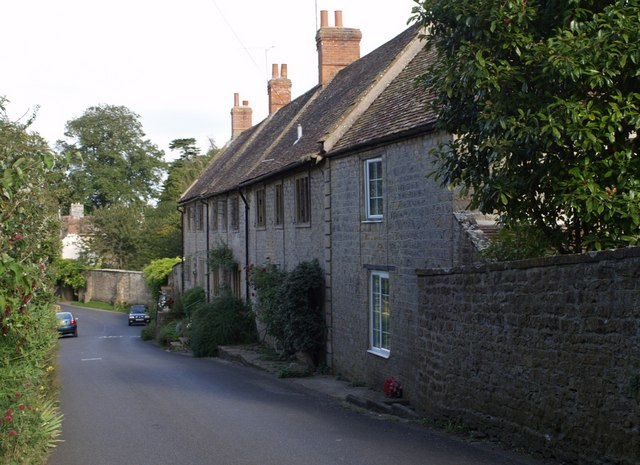
Gentlemans Row

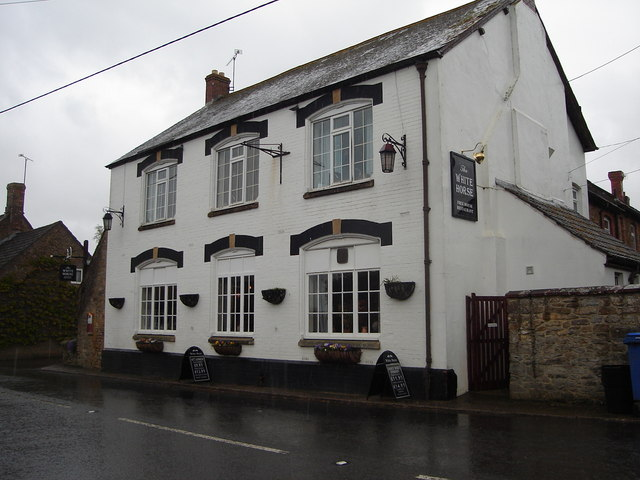
The White Horse Inn

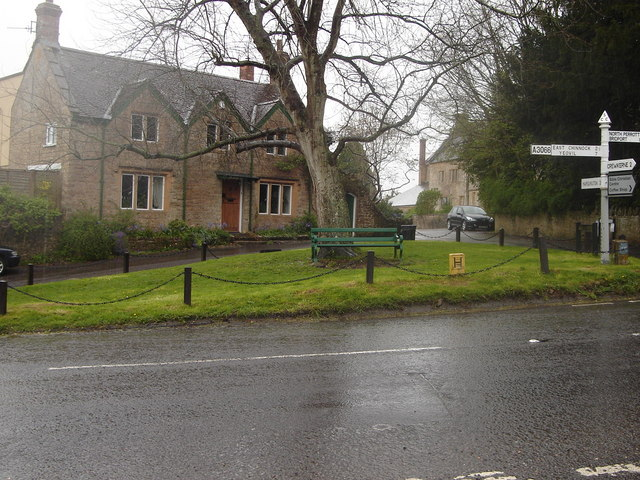
Village Green
