= Twenty-first Amendment to the United States Constitution =

1933 amendment repealing prohibition of alcohol

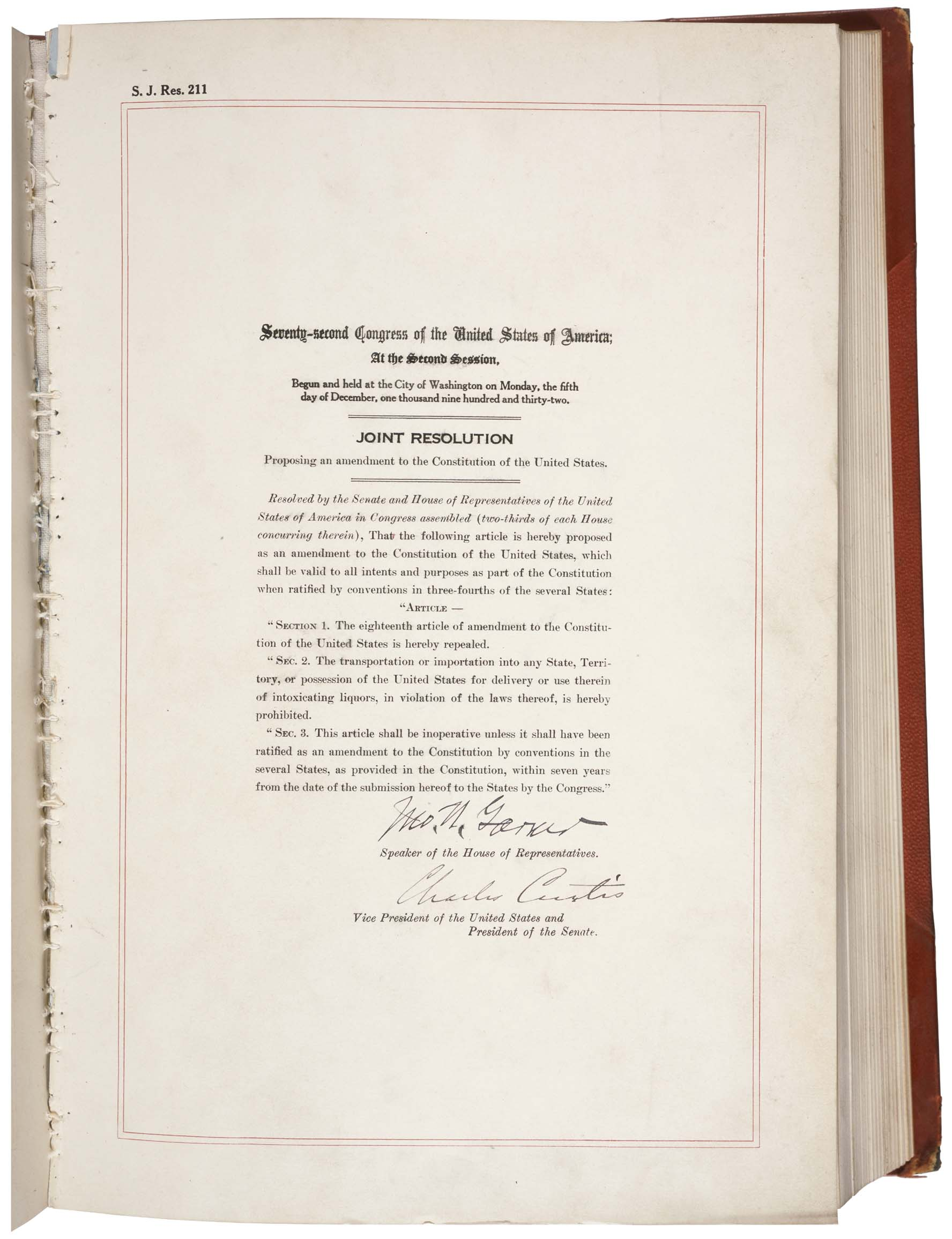
The Twenty-first Amendment in the National Archives

The Twenty-first Amendment (Amendment XXI) to the United States Constitution repealed the Eighteenth Amendment to the United States Constitution, which had mandated nationwide prohibition on alcohol. The Twenty-first Amendment was proposed by the 72nd Congress on February 20, 1933, and was ratified by the requisite number of states on December 5, 1933. It is unique among the 27 amendments of the U.S. Constitution for being the only one to repeal a prior amendment, as well as being the only amendment to have been ratified by state ratifying conventions.

The Eighteenth Amendment was ratified on January 16, 1919, after years of advocacy by the temperance movement. The subsequent enactment of the Volstead Act established federal enforcement of the nationwide prohibition on alcohol. As many Americans continued to drink despite the amendment, Prohibition gave rise to a profitable black market for alcohol, fueling the rise of organized crime. Throughout the 1920s, Americans increasingly came to see Prohibition as unenforceable, and a movement to repeal the Eighteenth Amendment grew until the Twenty-first Amendment was ratified in 1933.

Section 1 of the Twenty-first Amendment expressly repeals the Eighteenth Amendment. Section 2 bans the importation of alcohol into states and territories that have laws prohibiting the importation or consumption of alcohol. Several states continued to be "dry states" in the years after the repealing of the Eighteenth Amendment, and some continue to this day to closely regulate the distribution of alcohol. Many states delegate their power to ban the importation of alcohol to counties and municipalities, and there are numerous dry communities throughout the United States. Section 2 has occasionally arisen as an issue in Supreme Court cases that touch on the Commerce Clause.

== Text ==
Section 1. The eighteenth article of amendment to the Constitution of the United States is hereby repealed.

Section 2. The transportation or importation into any State, Territory, or possession of the United States for delivery or use therein of intoxicating liquors, in violation of the laws thereof, is hereby prohibited.

Section 3. This article shall be inoperative unless it shall have been ratified as an amendment to the Constitution by conventions in the several States, as provided in the Constitution, within seven years from the date of the submission hereof to the States by the Congress.

== Background ==
The Eighteenth Amendment to the Constitution had ushered in a period known as Prohibition, during which the manufacture, distribution, and sale of alcoholic beverages was illegal. The enactment of the Eighteenth Amendment in 1919 was the crowning achievement of the temperance movement, but it soon proved highly unpopular. Crime rates soared under Prohibition as gangsters, such as Chicago's Al Capone, became rich from a profitable, often violent, black market for alcohol. The federal government was incapable of stemming the tide: enforcement of the Volstead Act proved to be a nearly impossible task and corruption was rife among law enforcement agencies. In 1932, wealthy industrialist John D. Rockefeller Jr. stated in a letter:

When Prohibition was introduced, I hoped that it would be widely supported by public opinion and the day would soon come when the evil effects of alcohol would be recognized. I have slowly and reluctantly come to believe that this has not been the result. Instead, drinking has generally increased; the speakeasy has replaced the saloon; a vast army of lawbreakers has appeared; many of our best citizens have openly ignored Prohibition; respect for the law has been greatly lessened; and crime has increased to a level never seen before.

As more and more Americans opposed the Eighteenth Amendment, a political movement grew for its repeal. However, repeal was complicated by grassroots politics. Although the U.S. Constitution provides two methods for ratifying constitutional amendments, only one method had been used up until that time: ratification by the state legislatures of three-fourths of the states. However, the wisdom of the day was that the lawmakers of many states were either beholden to or simply fearful of the temperance lobby.

== Proposal and ratification ==
The Congress adopted the Blaine Act, which proposed the Twenty-first Amendment, on February 20, 1933.

The proposed amendment was adopted on December 5, 1933. It is the only amendment to have been ratified by state ratifying conventions, specifically selected for the purpose.

The Twenty-first Amendment ending national prohibition also became effective on December 5, 1933. The Acting Secretary of State William Phillips certified the amendment as having been passed by the required three-fourths of the states at 5:49 p.m. EST, just 17 minutes after the passage of the amendment by the Utah convention. President Roosevelt then issued a proclamation, stating in part: "I trust in the good sense of the American people that they will not bring upon themselves the curse of excessive use of intoxicating liquors to the detriment of health, morals and social integrity. The objective we seek through a national policy is the education of every citizen towards a greater temperance throughout the nation." A contemporary newsreel quoted a prediction of the creation of 500,000 jobs due to the end of prohibition.

The various responses of the 48 states are as follows:

The following states ratified the amendment:

1. Michigan: April 10, 1933 (99–1)
2. Wisconsin: April 25, 1933 (15–0)
3. Rhode Island: May 8, 1933 (31–0)
4. Wyoming: May 25, 1933 (65–0)
5. New Jersey: June 1, 1933 (202–2)
6. Delaware: June 24, 1933 (17–0)
7. Indiana: June 26, 1933 (246–83)
8. Massachusetts: June 26, 1933 (45–0)
9. New York: June 27, 1933 (150–0)
10. Illinois: July 10, 1933 (50–0)
11. Iowa: July 10, 1933 (90–0) (Note: In Iowa, 8 county delegates were absent during the vote, and 1 county delegate died before the convention.)
12. Connecticut: July 11, 1933 (50–0)
13. New Hampshire: July 11, 1933
14. California: July 24, 1933
15. West Virginia: July 25, 1933
16. Arkansas: August 1, 1933
17. Oregon: August 7, 1933
18. Alabama: August 8, 1933
19. Tennessee: August 11, 1933
20. Missouri: August 29, 1933
21. Arizona: September 5, 1933
22. Nevada: September 5, 1933
23. Vermont: September 23, 1933
24. Colorado: September 26, 1933
25. Washington: October 3, 1933
26. Minnesota: October 10, 1933
27. Idaho: October 17, 1933
28. Maryland: October 18, 1933
29. Virginia: October 25, 1933
30. New Mexico: November 2, 1933
31. Florida: November 14, 1933
32. Texas: November 24, 1933
33. Kentucky: November 27, 1933
34. Ohio: December 5, 1933
35. Pennsylvania: December 5, 1933
36. Utah: December 5, 1933 (20–0)

The amendment was officially added to the U.S. Constitution on December 5, 1933, when Utah's state convention unanimously ratified the amendment.

The amendment was subsequently ratified by conventions in the following states:

37. Maine: December 6, 1933 (72–0) (Note: In Maine, 8 state delegates were absent during the vote.)
38. Montana: August 6, 1934 (45–4)

The amendment was unanimously rejected by South Carolina's state convention on December 4, 1933. On November 7, 1933, North Carolina held a vote, and approximately 70% of its voters rejected holding a convention to consider the amendment.

== Implementation ==
=== State and local control ===
Mississippi was the last state to remain entirely dry. In August 1966, 19 of Mississippi's counties voted to legalize alcohol. (Note: In August 1966, Mississippi's Attala, Jefferson Davis, Lincoln, and Pike counties voted against legalizing alcohol.) Kansas continued to prohibit public bars until 1987. Many states now delegate the authority over alcohol granted to them by this Amendment to their municipalities or counties (or both).

=== Court rulings ===
Early rulings suggested that Section 2 enabled states to legislate with exceptionally broad constitutional powers. In State Board of Equalization v. Young's Market Co., the Supreme Court recognized that "Prior to the Twenty-first Amendment it would obviously have been unconstitutional" for a state to require a license and fee to import beer anywhere within its borders. First, the Court held that Section 2 abrogated the right to import intoxicating liquors free of a direct burden on interstate commerce, which otherwise would have been unconstitutional under the Commerce Clause before passage of the Twenty-first Amendment. In its second holding, the Court rejected an equal protection claim because "A classification recognized by the Twenty-first Amendment cannot be deemed forbidden by the Fourteenth."

In Craig v. Boren (1976), the Supreme Court found that analysis under the Equal Protection Clause of the Fourteenth Amendment had not been affected by the passage of the Twenty-first Amendment. Although the Court did not specify whether the Twenty-first Amendment could provide an exception to any other constitutional protections outside of the Commerce Clause, it acknowledged "the relevance of the Twenty-first Amendment to other constitutional provisions becomes increasingly doubtful". Likewise, it has been held that Section 2 of the Twenty-first Amendment does not affect the Supremacy Clause or the Establishment Clause. However, the Craig v. Boren Court did distinguish two characteristics of state laws permitted by the Amendment, which otherwise might have run afoul of the Constitution. The constitutional issues in each centered or touched upon: (1) "importation of intoxicants, a regulatory area where the State's authority under the Twenty-first Amendment is transparently clear"; and (2) "purely economic matters that traditionally merit only the mildest review under the Fourteenth Amendment". As to the Dormant Commerce Clause in particular, the Court clarified that, while not a pro tanto repeal, the Twenty-First Amendment nonetheless "primarily created an exception to the normal operation of the Commerce Clause".

In South Dakota v. Dole (1987), the Supreme Court upheld the withholding of some federal highway funds to South Dakota, because beer with an alcohol content below a specified percentage could be lawfully sold to adults under the age of 21 within the state. In a 7–2 majority opinion by Chief Justice Rehnquist, the Court held that the offer of benefits is not coercion that inappropriately invades state sovereignty. The Twenty-first Amendment could not constitute an "independent constitutional bar" to the spending power granted to Congress under Article I, section 8, clause 1 of the Constitution. Justice Brennan, author of the majority opinion in Craig v. Boren, provided a brief but notable dissent based solely on Section 2. Justice O'Connor also dissented, arguing that "the regulation of the age of the purchasers of liquor, just as the regulation of the price at which liquor may be sold, falls squarely within the scope of those powers reserved to the States by the Twenty-first Amendment."

In 44 Liquormart, Inc. v. Rhode Island (1996), the Court held states cannot use the Twenty-first Amendment to abridge freedom of speech protections under the First Amendment. Rhode Island imposed a law that prohibited advertisements disclosing the retail prices of alcoholic beverages sold to the public. In declaring the law unconstitutional, the Court reiterated that "although the Twenty-first Amendment limits the effect of the Dormant Commerce Clause on a State's regulatory power over the delivery or use of intoxicating beverages within its borders, the Amendment does not license the States to ignore their obligations under other provisions of the Constitution".

Most recently, however, Granholm v. Heald (2005) held that the Twenty-first Amendment does not overrule the Dormant Commerce Clause with respect to alcohol sales, and therefore states must treat in-state and out-of-state wineries equally. The Court criticized its earliest rulings on the issue, (including State Board of Equalization v. Young's Market Co.) and promulgated its most limited interpretation to date:

The aim of the Twenty-first Amendment was to allow States to maintain an effective and uniform system for controlling liquor by regulating its transportation, importation, and use. The Amendment did not give States the authority to pass nonuniform laws in order to discriminate against out-of-state goods, a privilege they had not enjoyed at any earlier time.

In a lengthy dissent, Justice Thomas argued that the plain meaning of Section 2 removed "any doubt regarding its broad scope, the Amendment simplified the language of the Webb–Kenyon Act and made it clear that States could regulate importation destined for in-state delivery free of negative Commerce Clause restraints".

== See also ==
- Alcoholic beverage control state
- List of alcohol laws of the United States by state
- List of dry communities by U.S. state
- Section 113 of the Constitution of Australia
