= Section 113 of the Constitution of Australia =

Section 113 of the Constitution of Australia provides that legally, all intoxicating liquids in a State are to be treated as if they were produced in that State and subject to that State's laws, even if in reality they were produced in another State.

It was created to limit the operation of Section 92 of the Constitution of Australia (which ensures free trade among the States) by granting States complete legislative power to regulate alcohol regardless of where the alcohol was originally produced. It is similar in effect to the Twenty-first Amendment to the United States Constitution.

== History ==
=== Temperance movement ===
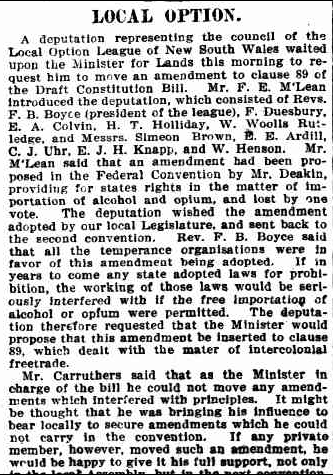
After its defeat at the Adelaide Constitutional Convention, the Local Option League of New South Wales requested that the Minister for Lands reintroduce the proposal allowing States to regulate imported alcohol. He said that he would not introduce the proposal due to his position but would support it if it was proposed by someone else.

The inclusion of section 113 was in the Constitution was advocated for by those in the Australian temperance movement. The Women's Christian Temperance Union, as well as other Australian temperance organisations, sent many petitions to the Constitutional Convention in support of section 113, leading proponent Alfred Deakin to remark that regardless of the merits of the section, it was important that it be included to obtain the support of "a very large section of the population who are amongst the most active politically".

In contrast to the American temperance movement's support of national prohibition, the Australian movement's support of regulation on an individual State basis may seem curious. Professor Helen Irving of the University of Sydney suggests that this was because it was recognised that "the likelihood of national prohibition was small", and reflects that "Had such women been involved directly in drafting the Constitution, they might well have argued for national prohibition".

=== Earlier proposals ===
Initially, at the Adelaide Constitutional Convention, Alfred Deakin proposed a resolution which would have allowed States to prohibit the importation of anything which they had first prohibited the sale of. After other delegates found problems with this amendment, Deakin amended it such that the States would only be able to restrict the importation of alcohol and opium, and such that the States would be able to regulate, not just prohibit, the sale of these items, provided that the regulation did not discriminate against imports. This proposal also failed in a 15–14 vote, largely due to Richard O'Connor's opposition.

Finally, at the Sydney session (which occurred about five months later), a new variant of the resolution was proposed and accepted. After several drafting amendments, Section 113 took its present form:

All fermented, distilled, or other intoxicating liquids passing into any State or remaining therein for use, consumption, sale, or storage, shall be subject to the laws of the State as if such liquids had been produced in the State.

=== O'Connor's concerns ===
Though most of the Constitution's framers supported the right of individual States to regulate alcohol, some – such as Richard O'Connor – believed Section 113 to be unnecessary because the States would already have this power despite Section 92. Furthermore, O'Connor was concerned that by the specific inclusion of Section 113 (and Section 112), the police power of the States would be limited to the powers which were specifically enumerated.

Because of the decision of the Supreme Court of the United States in Leisy v. Hardin (which found that the Commerce Clause prevented Iowa from restricting the sale of liquor imported from Illinois), the delegates decided that Section 113 would be included as a cautionary measure.

The question of whether the Constitution gave States a police power was unresolved at the time the Constitution was ratified. However, it was later resolved by the High Court that the American concept of police power had no application in relation to the Australian Constitution.

== See also ==
- Dennis Hotels Pty Ltd v Victoria
- Temperance movement in Australia
