= John of Ford =

Abbot and religious writer

John of Ford (c. 1140 – 21 April 1214) was the prior of the Cistercian monastery of Forde, then from 1186 abbot of its daughter house of Bindon, and between 1191 and 1214 the abbot of Forde. He was a friend and ally of King John during the papal interdict, receiving remuneration from the king. While prior he wrote a biography of the local anchorite Wulfric of Haselbury (the Vita Wulfrici anchoretae Haselbergiae), and while abbot he completed the series of sermons on the Song of Songs begun by Bernard of Clairvaux and continued by Gilbert of Hoyland with 120 sermons on his own from the fifth chapter through the end of the book. In the centuries after his death in 1214, however, John of Ford was almost entirely forgotten. His 120 sermons survive in only a single manuscript.

== Modern editions ==
- John of Ford, Sermons on the Final Verses of the Song of Songs, 7 vols, Cistercian Fathers series nos. 29, 39, 43, 44, 45, 46, 47, (Kalamazoo, MI: Cistercian Publications, 1977–1984)
- John of Forde, The Life of Wulfric of Haselbury, Anchorite, Translated with an Introduction and Notes by Pauline Matarasso. Cistercian Fathers series no. 79, (Trappist, KY; Collegeville, MN: Cistercian Publications; Liturgical Press, 2011)

== Sources ==
- C. J. Holdsworth. "John of Ford and the Interdict." English Historical Review, 78:309 (1963), 705–14.
- C. J. Holdsworth. "John of Ford and English Cistercian Writing, 1167–1214." Transactions of the Royal Historical Society, Fifth Series, 11 (1961), 117–36.
