= State ratifying conventions =

Method of ratifying amendments to the United States Constitution

State ratifying conventions are one of the two methods established by Article V of the United States Constitution for ratifying proposed constitutional amendments. The only amendment that has been ratified through this method thus far is the 21st Amendment in 1933.

== Constitutional text ==
Article V reads in pertinent part (italics added):

The Congress, whenever two thirds of both Houses shall deem it necessary, shall propose Amendments to this Constitution, or, on the Application of the Legislatures of two thirds of the States, shall call a Convention for proposing Amendments, which, in either Case, shall be valid to all Intents and Purposes, as Part of this Constitution, when ratified by the Legislatures of three fourths of the several States, or by Conventions in three fourths thereof, as the one or the other Mode of Ratification may be proposed by the Congress.…

== Use of the convention ratification option ==
Ratification of a proposed amendment has been done by state conventions only once—the 1933 ratification process of the 21st Amendment. The 21st is also the only constitutional amendment that repealed another one, that being the 18th Amendment, which had been ratified 14 years earlier.

As is true for a state legislature when ratifying a proposed federal constitutional amendment, a state ratifying convention may not in any way change a proposed constitutional amendment, but must accept or reject the proposed amendment as written.

== Purpose ==
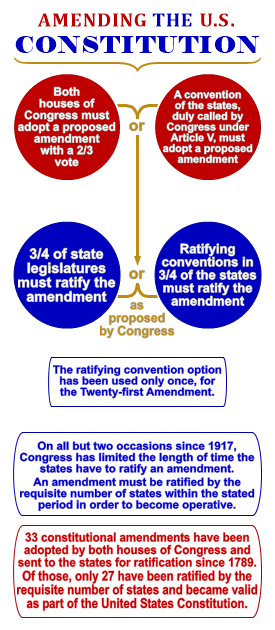
The U.S. constitutional amendment process

The convention method of ratification described in Article V is an alternate route to considering the pro and con arguments of a particular proposed amendment, as the framers of the Constitution wanted a means of potentially bypassing the state legislatures in the ratification process.

To some extent, the convention method of ratification loosely approximates a one-state, one-vote national referendum on a specific proposed federal constitutional amendment, thus allowing the sentiments of registered voters to be somewhat more directly felt on highly sensitive issues. The theory is that the delegates of the conventions—who presumably would themselves be average citizens—might be less likely to bow to political pressure to accept or to reject a given amendment than would be the case with state legislators. The United States Supreme Court has ruled that a popular referendum is not a substitute for either the legislature or a ratifying convention—nor can a referendum approve of, or disapprove of, a state legislature's, or a convention's, decision on an amendment (Hawke v. Smith, 253 U.S. 221, [1920]). This ruling was challenged in Arizona State Legislature v. Arizona Independent Redistricting Commission, in which the United States Supreme Court defined the term "legislature" broadly to include "the power that makes laws", which the court held included direct lawmaking by the people of the state. The majority opinion stated that the Article V use of the term "legislature" applied only to the representative body of the states as a "federal" function, as opposed to a "state" function of the legislature as prescribed in Article 1, Section 4 of the U.S. Constitution. This conflict over the interpretation of the word "legislature" creates potential constitutional questions over the role that popular referendums could play in state ratifying conventions.

New Mexico law provides that the members of its legislature would themselves be the delegates and form such a ratifying convention—if Congress were to again select that particular method of ratification. The issue having never come before the federal courts, it is unknown whether this New Mexico state law violates Article V.

== By state ==
In a state's legislature, the ratification method is procedurally simple—merely propose a resolution, memorial, or proclamation of ratification and vote it up or down in each chamber of that state legislature. The convention method of ratification is more complex because it is, by necessity, separate and different from a state legislature. As early as the 1930s, state lawmakers enacted laws to prepare for the possibility of Congress specifying the convention method of ratification. Many laws refer to a one-off event, with an ad-hoc convention convened solely for the purposes of the 21st Amendment. Other laws, however, provided guidelines for ratifying conventions in general.

=== Delaware ===
In Delaware, the governor announces an election of delegates; the latest date possible is the next general election held at least three months after the amendment has been proposed.

The convention has 17 members, of which seven are from New Castle County, five from Kent County, and five from Sussex County. Slates of candidates are nominated by petition; nine slates are selected, one for each county and for each position (for, against, or uncommitted as to the proposed amendment) based on the petitions with the most signatures. In the election, slates from the three counties are merged into three tickets (for, against, or uncommitted), and delegates are all elected using at-large statewide block voting; there is the option to vote straight-ticket but no write-in.

=== Florida ===
In Florida, the governor has 45 days to announce the election. The election is held between five and ten months after Congress proposes the amendment, unless a statewide election is to be held within a year in which case the governor can hold the delegates election at that time.

The convention has 67 members. They are all elected using at-large statewide block voting, with candidates being listed on the ballot by category of whether they declared themselves for, against, or unpledged as to the proposed amendment; write-in votes are allowed. Filing for candidacy requires a $25 fee and a 500-name petition if the candidate declares themselves pledged.

The convention meets on the second Tuesday following the election and a majority of delegates forms a quorum. Delegates receive no compensation.

=== New Mexico ===
In New Mexico, the governor has 10 days to call a convention. The convention is not elected but rather formed by all members of the New Mexico Legislature.

The legislators assemble in the chamber of the New Mexico House of Representatives in a meeting presided over by the lieutenant governor. They receive compensation for three days.

=== Vermont ===
In Vermont, the governor has 60 days to call for the election of delegates to the state ratifying convention. The state convention has 14 members, as many as counties in Vermont.

The governor, lieutenant governor, and speaker of the Vermont State House nominate 28 candidates, two from each county: one for ratification and one against. Candidates are listed on the ballot by label (for or against); the election of delegates uses at-large statewide block voting, where every elector can vote for up to 14 candidates regardless of label and the top-fourteen vote-getters are elected; write-in votes are allowed.

The governor chooses a date for the opening of the convention, within 20 to 30 days after the election. The convention meets in the Vermont Senate chamber in Montpelier, and a majority of the elected delegates are a quorum. The Vermont state code gives few rules for the proceedings of the convention, with a $10 compensation and reimbursement of expenses.
