= Haselbury Bridge =

Haselbury Bridge Haselbury Old Bridge
- Coordinates: 50.8956°N 2.7713°W
- Carries: Road
- Crosses: River Parrett
- Locale: Haselbury Plucknett, Somerset, England
- Heritage status: Scheduled monument, Grade II* listed building

Characteristics
- Design: Arch bridge
- Material: Hamstone
- Width: 4.1 metres (13 ft)

History
- Construction end: 14th century

Location
- Interactive map of Haselbury Bridge

Haselbury Bridge (sometimes called Haselbury Old Bridge) is a stone built bridge dating from the 14th century in Haselbury Plucknett in the English county of Somerset. It is a scheduled monument and Grade II* listed building.

The two arch bridge was built of local Hamstone and carries a small road over the River Parrett. Each of the arches has a 3 metres (9.8 ft) span. The bridge is 4.1 metres (13 ft) wide including the parapet on each side.

In the 17th century it carried the main route between Salisbury and Exeter and later marked the boundary between the Chard and Yeovil turnpike trusts. The bridge was bypassed in 1831.
