= Eighteenth Amendment to the United States Constitution =

1919 amendment establishing prohibition of alcohol; null and void since 1933

The Eighteenth Amendment (Amendment XVIII) to the United States Constitution established the prohibition of alcohol in the United States. The amendment was proposed by Congress on December 18, 1917, and ratified by the requisite number of states on January 16, 1919. The Eighteenth Amendment was repealed by the Twenty-first Amendment on December 5, 1933, making it the only constitutional amendment in American history to be repealed.

The Eighteenth Amendment was the product of decades of efforts by the temperance movement, which held that a ban on the sale of alcohol would ameliorate poverty and other societal problems. The Eighteenth Amendment declared the production, transport, and sale of intoxicating liquors illegal, although it did not outlaw possession or consumption of alcohol. Shortly after the amendment was ratified, Congress passed the Volstead Act to provide for the federal enforcement of Prohibition. The Volstead Act declared that liquor, wine, and beer qualified as intoxicating liquors, and were therefore prohibited. Under the terms of the Eighteenth Amendment, Prohibition began on January 17, 1920, one year after the amendment was ratified.

Although the Eighteenth Amendment led to a decline in alcohol consumption in the United States, nationwide enforcement of Prohibition proved difficult, particularly in cities. Alcohol smuggling (known as rum-running or bootlegging) and illicit bars (speakeasies) became popular in many areas. Public sentiment began to turn against Prohibition during the 1920s, and 1932 Democratic presidential nominee Franklin D. Roosevelt called for its repeal.

== Text ==
Section 1. After one year from the ratification of this article the manufacture, sale, or transportation of intoxicating liquors within, the importation thereof into, or the exportation thereof from the United States and all territory subject to the jurisdiction thereof for beverage purposes is hereby prohibited.

Section 2. The Congress and the several States shall have concurrent power to enforce this article by appropriate legislation.

Section 3. This article shall be inoperative unless it shall have been ratified as an amendment to the Constitution by the legislatures of the several States, as provided in the Constitution, within seven years from the date of the submission hereof to the States by the Congress.

== Background ==
The Eighteenth Amendment was the result of decades of effort by the temperance movement in the United States and at the time was generally considered a progressive amendment. Founded in 1893 in Oberlin, Ohio, the Anti-Saloon League (ASL) started in 1906 a campaign to ban the sale of alcohol at the state level. Their speeches, advertisements, and public demonstrations claimed that prohibition of alcohol would eliminate poverty and ameliorate social problems such as immoral sexual behavior and violence. The ASL argued that prohibition would inspire new forms of sociability, create happier families, reduce workplace accidents, and improve the world overall. (Following the repeal of Prohibition, the group merged into the National Temperance League.)

Other groups, such as the Woman's Christian Temperance Union, also launched efforts to ban the sale, manufacture, and distribution of alcoholic beverages. Churches were also highly influential in gaining new members and support, garnering 6,000 local societies in several different states. The well-known reformer Carrie Nation became a household name for her militancy, such as vandalizing saloon property. Many state legislatures had already enacted statewide prohibition prior to the ratification of the Eighteenth Amendment but did not ban the consumption of alcohol in most households. By 1916, 23 of 48 states had already passed laws against saloons, some even banning the manufacture of alcohol.

== Proposal and ratification ==
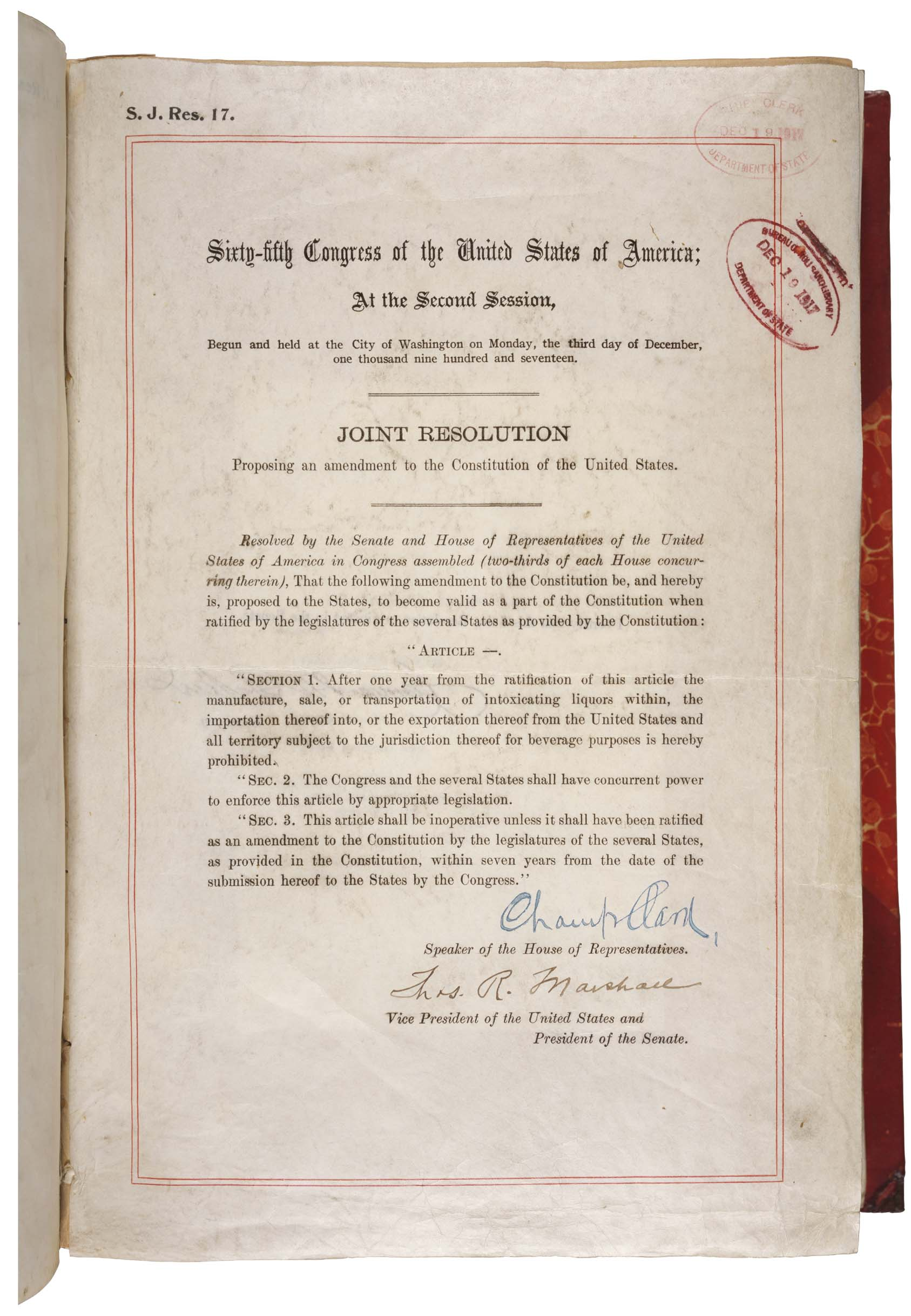
The Eighteenth Amendment in the National Archives

On August 1, 1917, the Senate passed a resolution containing the language of the amendment to be presented to the states for ratification. The vote was 65 to 20, with the Democrats voting 36 in favor and 12 in opposition and the Republicans voting 29 in favor and 8 in opposition. The House of Representatives passed a revised resolution on December 17, 1917. This was the first amendment to impose a deadline date for ratification. If ratification did not occur before the deadline date, the amendment would be discarded.

In the House, the vote was 282 to 128, with the Democrats voting 141 in favor and 64 in opposition and the Republicans voting 137 in favor and 62 in opposition. Four independents in the House voted in favor and two voted against the amendment. It was officially proposed by the Congress to the states when the Senate passed the resolution by a vote of 47 to 8 the next day, December 18.

The amendment and its enabling legislation did not ban the consumption of alcohol outright but prohibited the sale, manufacture, and distribution of alcohol in the United States. Those caught selling, manufacturing, or distributing alcoholic beverages would be subject to arrest. The amendment superseded the many state and regional restrictions already in place.

Ratification was achieved on January 16, 1919, when Nebraska became the 36th of the 48 states to ratify the amendment. On January 29, acting secretary of state Frank L. Polk certified the ratification. By 1922, 46 states had ratified the amendment.

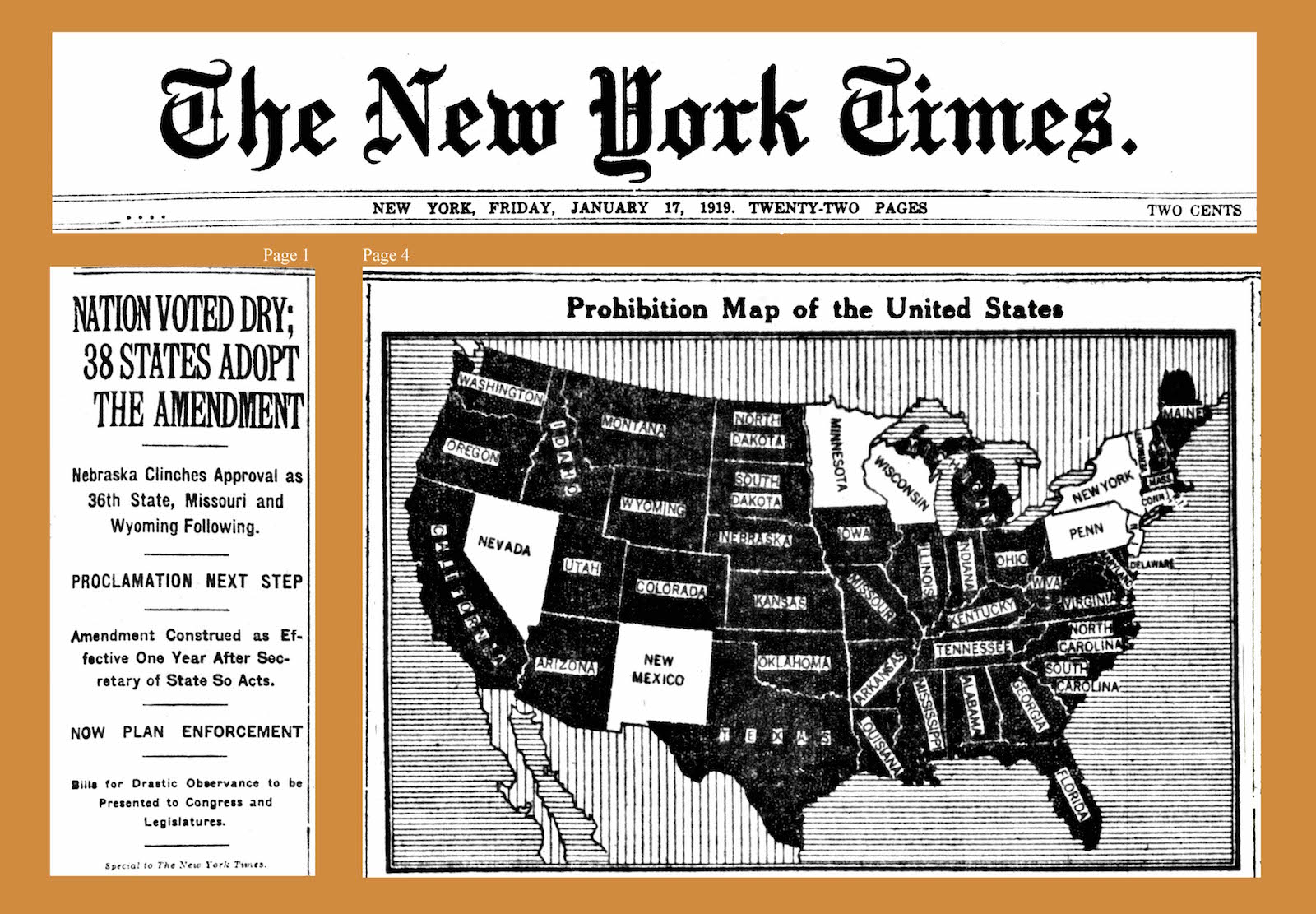
After the 36th state adopted the amendment on January 16, 1919, the U.S. Secretary of State had to issue a formal proclamation declaring its ratification. Implementing and enforcement bills had to be presented to Congress and state legislatures, to be enacted before the amendment's effective date one year later.

The following states ratified the amendment:

1. Mississippi: January 7, 1918
2. Virginia: January 11, 1918
3. Kentucky: January 14, 1918
4. North Dakota: January 25, 1918 (Note: Effective January 28, 1918, the date on which the North Dakota ratification was approved by the state Governor.)
5. South Carolina: January 29, 1918
6. Maryland: February 13, 1918
7. Montana: February 19, 1918
8. Texas: March 4, 1918
9. Delaware: March 18, 1918
10. South Dakota: March 20, 1918
11. Massachusetts: April 2, 1918
12. Arizona: May 24, 1918
13. Georgia: June 26, 1918
14. Louisiana: August 3, 1918 (Note: Effective August 9, 1918, the date on which the Louisiana ratification was approved by the state Governor.)
15. Florida: November 27, 1918
16. Michigan: January 2, 1919
17. Ohio: January 7, 1919
18. Oklahoma: January 7, 1919
19. Idaho: January 8, 1919
20. Maine: January 8, 1919
21. West Virginia: January 9, 1919
22. California: January 13, 1919
23. Tennessee: January 13, 1919
24. Washington: January 13, 1919
25. Arkansas: January 14, 1919
26. Illinois: January 14, 1919
27. Indiana: January 14, 1919
28. Kansas: January 14, 1919
29. Alabama: January 15, 1919
30. Colorado: January 15, 1919
31. Iowa: January 15, 1919
32. New Hampshire: January 15, 1919
33. Oregon: January 15, 1919
34. North Carolina: January 16, 1919
35. Utah: January 16, 1919
36. Nebraska: January 16, 1919
37. Missouri: January 16, 1919
38. Wyoming: January 16, 1919
39. Minnesota: January 17, 1919
40. Wisconsin: January 17, 1919
41. New Mexico: January 20, 1919
42. Nevada: January 21, 1919
43. New York: January 29, 1919
44. Vermont: January 29, 1919
45. Pennsylvania: February 25, 1919
46. New Jersey: March 9, 1922

Two states rejected the amendment:

1. Connecticut
2. Rhode Island

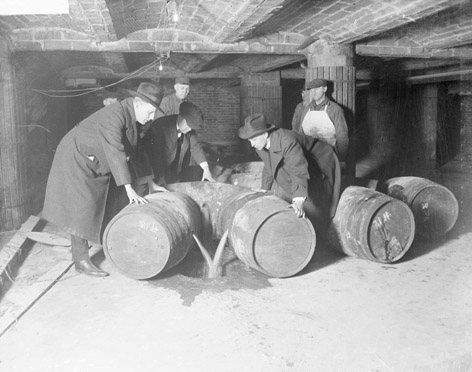
Prohibition agents destroying barrels of alcohol

To define the language used in the amendment, Congress enacted enabling legislation called the National Prohibition Act, better known as the Volstead Act, on October 28, 1919. President Woodrow Wilson vetoed that bill, but the House of Representatives immediately voted to override the veto and the Senate followed suit the next day. The Volstead Act set the starting date for nationwide prohibition as January 17, 1920, the earliest date allowed by the Eighteenth Amendment.

== The Volstead Act ==
This legislation that would become the National Prohibition Act was conceived and introduced by Wayne Wheeler, a leader of the Anti-Saloon League, a group that found alcohol responsible for almost all of society's problems and that also ran many campaigns against the sale of alcohol. The law was strongly supported by the powerful Minnesota Republican congressman Andrew Volstead, chairman of the House Judiciary Committee, whose name came to be informally associated with the act. The act laid the groundwork for Prohibition, defining the procedures for banning the distribution of alcohol, including production and distribution.

Volstead had previously introduced an early version of the law to Congress. It was first brought to the floor on May 27, 1919, but met heavy resistance from Democratic senators. Instead, the so-called "wet law" was introduced, an attempt to end the wartime prohibition laws put into effect much earlier. The debate over prohibition persisted for that entire session, as the House was divided among groups who become known as the "bone-drys" and the "wets". The Volstead Act finally passed the Republican-led House of Representatives on July 22, 1919, with 287 in favor and 100 opposed.

However, the act was largely a failure, proving unable to prevent mass distribution of alcoholic beverages and also inadvertently causing a massive increase in organized crime. The act defined the terms and enforcement methods of Prohibition until the ratification of the Twenty-first Amendment repealed it in 1933.

== Controversies ==
The proposed amendment was the first to contain a provision setting a deadline for its ratification. That clause of the amendment was challenged, with the case reaching the Supreme Court, which upheld the constitutionality of such a deadline in the case of Dillon v. Gloss (1921). The Supreme Court also upheld the ratification by the Ohio legislature in Hawke v. Smith (1920), despite a petition requiring that the matter proceed to ballot.

This was not the only controversy around the amendment. The phrase "intoxicating liquor" was widely understood to exclude beer and wine (as they are not distilled), and their inclusion in Prohibition surprised many in the general public as well as producers of wine and beer. This controversy caused many Northern states to refuse to abide by the amendment.

Under Prohibition, illegal importation and production of alcoholic beverages (such as rum-running and bootlegging) occurred on a large scale nationwide. In urban areas, where the majority of the population tended to oppose Prohibition, enforcement was generally much weaker than in rural areas and smaller towns. Perhaps the most dramatic consequence of Prohibition was its effect on organized crime. As the production and sale of alcohol went further underground, it began to be controlled by the Mafia and other gangs that transformed into sophisticated criminal enterprises that reaped huge profits from the illicit liquor trade.

Organized-crime syndicates became skilled at bribing police and politicians to overlook violations of Prohibition during the 1920s. Chicago's Al Capone emerged as the most notorious example, earning an estimated $60 million annually from his bootlegging and speakeasy operations. Gambling and prostitution also reached new heights, and a growing number of Americans came to blame Prohibition and to condemn it as a dangerous infringement of individual freedom.

In the late 1920s, a formula for denaturing alcohol became available. It doubled how poisonous the industrial alcohol was. As deaths increased due to alcohol poisoning the idea that government was behind the murders gathered steam. New Jersey senator Edward I. Edwards referred to it as "legalized murder." Government officials and Anti-Saloon League leader Wayne B. Wheeler were often unapologetic and indifferent when questioned about their knowledge or role in such a program. It was later found that the government ordered the poisoning of industrial alcohol to scare people from drinking bootlegged liquor. The program instead killed an estimated 10,000 people.

== Calls for repeal ==
Public sentiment turned against Prohibition by the late 1920s, and the Great Depression only hastened its demise, as opponents argued that the ban on alcohol denied jobs to the unemployed and much-needed revenue to the government. The efforts of the nonpartisan Association Against the Prohibition Amendment (AAPA) added to public disillusionment. In 1932, the platform of Democratic presidential candidate Franklin D. Roosevelt included a plan for repealing the 18th Amendment, and his victory that November led to the end of Prohibition.

In February 1933, Congress adopted a resolution proposing the Twenty-first Amendment, which repealed the 18th Amendment and modified the Volstead Act to permit the sale of beer. The resolution required state conventions, rather than the state legislatures, to approve the amendment, effectively reducing the process to a one-state, one-vote referendum rather than a popular vote. A few states continued statewide prohibition after 1933, but by 1966 they all had abandoned it.

== Impact ==
Just after the Eighteenth Amendment's adoption, there was a significant reduction in alcohol consumption among the general public and particularly among low-income groups. There were fewer hospitalizations for alcoholism and likewise fewer liver-related medical problems. However, consumption soon climbed as underworld entrepreneurs began producing dangerous "rotgut" alcohol. With the rise of home-distilled alcohol, careless distilling led to as many as 10,000 deaths attributed to wood alcohol (methanol) poisoning. However, during Prohibition, the rate of use and abuse of alcohol remained significantly lower than before enactment.

Though Prohibition created a new category of crimes involving the production and distribution of alcohol, there was an initial reduction in crime associated with drunkenness. Those who continued to drink alcohol tended to turn to organized criminal syndicates. Law enforcement could not stop much illicit liquor; however, they used "sting" operations, such as Prohibition agent Eliot Ness famously using wiretapping to uncover secret breweries. The prisons became crowded, which led to fewer arrests for the distribution of alcohol, as well as those arrested being charged with small fines rather than prison time. The murder rate fell for two years, but then rose to record highs due to gangland killings, a trend that reversed the very year prohibition ended. The homicide rate increased from six per 100,000 population in the pre-Prohibition period to nearly ten. Overall, crime rose 24%, including increases in assault and battery, theft, and burglary.

Anti-prohibition groups were formed and worked to have the Eighteenth Amendment repealed, which was done by adoption of the Twenty-first Amendment on December 5, 1933.

== Bootlegging and organized crime ==
Following ratification in 1919, the amendment's effects were long-lasting, leading to increases in crime in many large cities, such as Chicago, New York and Los Angeles. Along with this came many separate forms of illegal alcohol distribution, such as speakeasies, bootlegging, and illegal distilling operations.

Bootlegging started in towns bordering Mexico and Canada as well as in areas with multiple ports and harbors. The alcohol was often supplied by foreign distributors from nations such as Cuba and the Bahamas, and some even came from Newfoundland and islands under French rule.

In response, the government employed the Coast Guard to search and detain ships transporting alcohol into the country, but caused several complications such as disputes over national jurisdiction areas at sea. Atlantic City, New Jersey became a frequent location for smuggling operations because of a shipping point nearly three miles offshore that officials could not investigate, further complicating enforcement. The Coast Guard was not well-equipped to chase down bootlegging vessels but began searching ships at sea instead of when they arrived at port, and upgraded its boats to facilitate more efficient and consistent arrests.

One complication that plagued the government's enforcement efforts involved forged prescriptions for alcoholic beverages. Many forms of alcohol were sold over the counter purportedly for medical purposes, but some manufacturers falsified evidence that their products were of medicinal value.

Bootlegging was the leading factor in the development of organized-crime rings in large cities, as controlling and distributing liquor was very difficult. Many profitable gangs controlled every aspect of the distribution process, such as concealed brewing and storage, operation of speakeasys, and selling alcohol in restaurants and nightclubs run by crime syndicates. With organized crime becoming a rising problem, control of specific territories was a key objective among gangs, leading to many violent confrontations such as the Saint Valentine's Day Massacre; as a result, murder rates and burglaries dramatically increased between 1920 and 1933. Bootlegging was also found to be a gateway crime for many gangs who would then expand into crimes such as prostitution, gambling rackets, narcotics, loan sharking, extortion, and labor rackets, thus causing problems that persisted long after the amendment was repealed.

== See also ==
- Dry county
- Section 113 of the Constitution of Australia
