= Wulfric of Haselbury =

Anchorite and saint

Saint Wulfric
- Born: c. 1080; Compton Martin, Somerset, England
- Died: 20 February 1154 (aged 73–74); Haselbury Plucknett, Somerset, England
- Venerated in: Roman Catholic Church, Anglican Communion
- Feast: 20 February

Wulfric of Haselbury (c. 1080 – 20 February 1154) was an anchorite and miracle worker in Wiltshire and Somerset, England, frequently visited by King Stephen. His feast day is 20 February.

== Life ==
Wulfric was born at Compton Martin, ten miles south of Bristol. After becoming a priest, he at first exercised his ministry at Deverill, near Warminster. At this stage he was apparently much addicted to hunting, with both hawks and hounds. A chance conversation with a beggar, however, converted him to more godly pursuits, and he moved back to Compton Martin as parish priest.

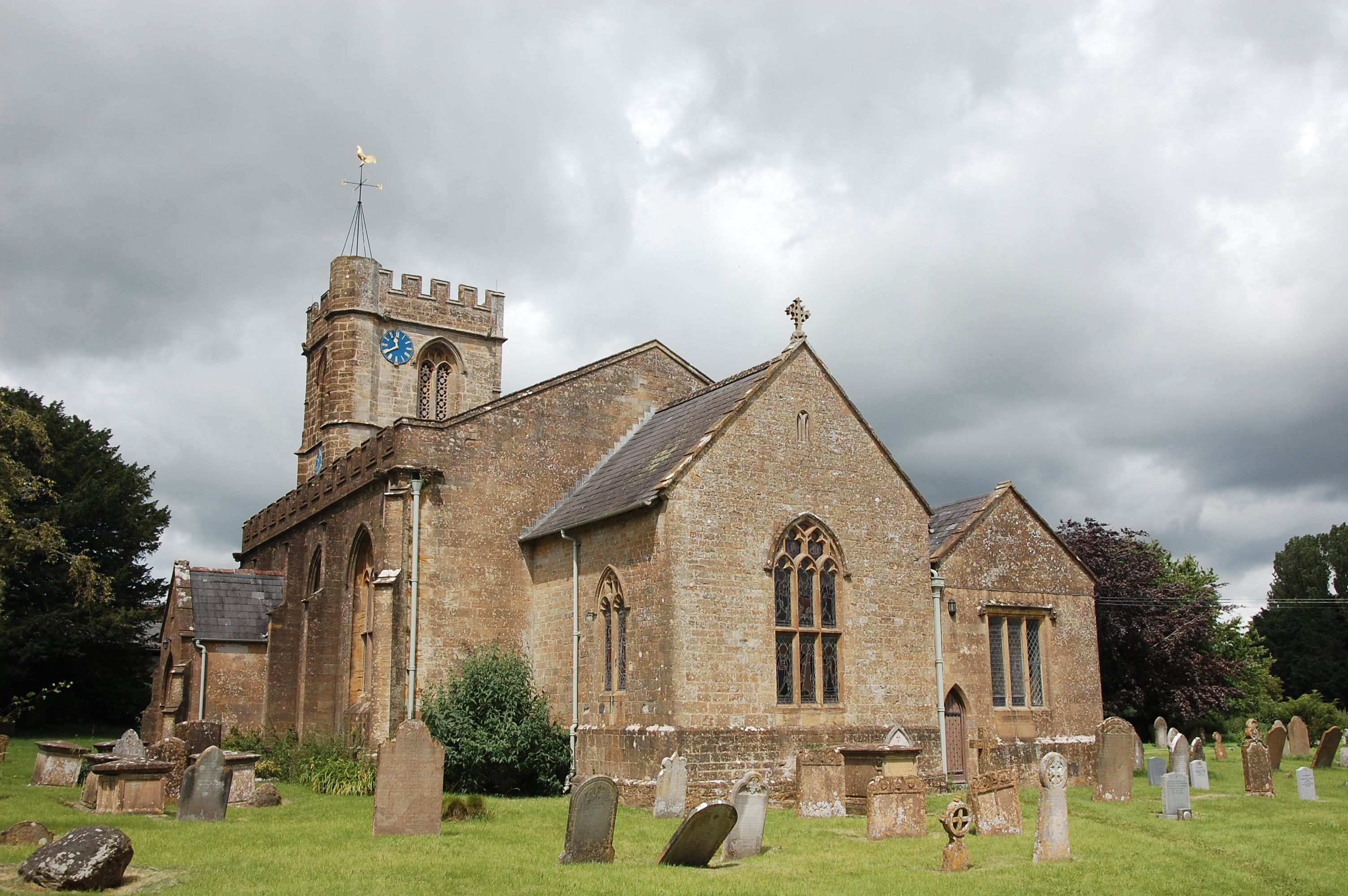
St Michael and All Angels Church, Haselbury Plucknett

In the year 1125, Wulfric came to St Michael and All Angels Church in Haselbury Plucknett, Somerset. He wished to spend the rest of his life as an anchorite, withdrawn from the world, living in a cell adjacent to the church. This cell stood on the cold northern side of the chancel where the vestry is now. Although he apparently failed to obtain episcopal permission for this move, he was supported by the Cluniac monks at Montacute. Sir William FitzWalter had a great respect for his saintly neighbour; he sent provisions to him and visited him from time to time. Wulfric numbered among his intimate friends Osbern, the village priest; William, a lay brother of Forde Abbey; and Brichtric, who seems to have joined him as a disciple or attendant.

Soon, people came to him for guidance and blessing. During the reigns of kings Henry I and Stephen, Wulfric exercised a powerful influence, not only in his own neighbourhood but also at court. Henry I was informed, correctly, that he would shortly die, while King Stephen was chastised for the evils of his government. Wulfric is said to have received the gifts of prophecy and healing and was involved in many miraculous happenings. He became known as a healer of body, mind, and spirit for all those who sought him out.

One of his visitors was Matilda of Wareham who had been planning to work overseas. Wulfric persuaded her that she should become an anchorite. She was committed and agreed to go to Wareham to work for over two years while a cell was created for her. She returned with her servant Gertrude. She died in the cell after fifteen years and Gertrude agreed to take her place.

According to Abbot John of Forde Abbey, Wulfric lived alone in these simple quarters for 29 years, devoting much of his time to reading the Bible and praying. In keeping with the ideals of medieval spirituality, he adopted stern ascetic practices: he deprived himself of sleep, ate a frugal and meatless diet, spent hours reciting the psalms sitting in a bath of cold water, and wore a hair shirt and heavy chain-mail tunic.

One of the most influential anchorite priests of medieval England, he died in his cell on 20 February 1154. At his death, a scuffle occurred in and around St. Michael's between black-robed Norman Cluniac monks from Montacute and common folk from Haselbury and Crewkerne who had been summoned by Osbern, the priest of Haselbury. The monks maintained that providing food for the anchorite, which they had done for many years, gave them a claim to the holy man's mortal remains. But the locals forced them to withdraw and Wulfric was buried in his cell by the bishop of Bath who had visited him at his death-bed. For security reasons, Osbern moved Wulfric's remains twice, until they came to rest somewhere near the west end of the church, "...in a place known only to himself and God".

== Legacy ==
In July 2009, The Wulfric Festival was held at the parish churches of St Michael and All Angels at Haselbury and St Martin's at North Perrott, being three days of classical, folk, jazz, and West gallery music, all in aid of the restoration of the two churches.
