= List of proposed amendments to the Constitution of the United States =

Hundreds of proposed amendments to the United States Constitution are introduced during each session of the United States Congress. From 1789 through January 3, 2025, approximately 11,985 measures have been proposed to amend the United States Constitution. Collectively, members of the House and Senate typically propose around 200 amendments during each two-year term of Congress. Most, however, never get out of the Congressional committees in which they were proposed. Only a fraction of those actually receive enough support to win Congressional approval to go through the constitutional ratification process. Some proposed amendments are introduced over and over again in different sessions of Congress. It is also common for a number of identical resolutions to be offered on issues that have widespread public and congressional support.

Since 1789, Congress has sent 33 constitutional amendments to the states for ratification. Of these, 27 have been ratified. The framers of the Constitution, recognizing the difference between regular legislation and constitutional matters, intended that it be difficult to change the Constitution; but not so difficult as to render it an inflexible instrument of government, as the amendment mechanism in the Articles of Confederation, which required a unanimous vote of thirteen states for ratification, had proven to be. Therefore, a less stringent process for amending the Constitution was established in Article V.

== The amending process ==
Amending the United States Constitution is a two-step process. Proposals to amend it must be properly adopted and ratified before becoming operative. A proposed amendment may be adopted and sent to the states for ratification by either:

- The United States Congress, whenever a two-thirds majority in both the Senate and the House deem it necessary;
  or
- A national convention, called by Congress for this purpose, on the application of the legislatures of two-thirds (presently 34) of the states.

The latter procedure has never been used. To become part of the Constitution, an adopted amendment must be ratified by either:

- The legislatures of three-fourths (presently 38) of the states;
  or
- State ratifying conventions in three-fourths (presently 38) of the states.

The decision of which ratification method will be used for any given amendment is Congress's alone to make. Only for the 21st amendment was the latter procedure invoked and followed. Upon being properly ratified, an amendment becomes an operative addition to the Constitution.

== 19th century ==
Constitutional amendment proposals considered in but not approved by Congress during the 19th century included:

- The Dueling Ban Amendment, proposed in 1838 after Representative William Graves killed another Representative, Jonathan Cilley, in a duel, would have prohibited any person involved in a duel from holding federal office.
- Shortly before his death, during the congressional debates leading to the Compromise of 1850, John C. Calhoun proposed constitutional amendments requiring an equal number of slave states and free states and creating two co-presidents from the North and the South which would have to concur on all legislation. A similar amendment to eliminate the presidency so as to have two elected officials in its place, was proposed by Virginia Representative Albert Jenkins in 1860 shortly before sectional tensions escalated into the American Civil War. Jenkins saw the amendment as a way for both the Northern and the Southern states to be represented equally in the government at a given time.
- The Christian Amendment, first proposed in February 1863, would have added acknowledgment of the Christian God in the Preamble to the Constitution. Similar amendments were proposed in 1874, 1896, and 1910 with none passing. The last attempt, in 1954, did not come to a vote.
- The Blaine Amendment, proposed in 1875, would have banned public funds from going to religious purposes, in order to prevent Catholics from taking advantage of such funds. Though it failed to pass, many states adopted such provisions.
- An amendment allowing property-owning unmarried women to vote was proposed by Representative William Mason. The underlying logic behind this amendment was that these single women did not have husbands to represent their interests via the vote. Elizabeth Cady Stanton, a suffragist at the time, stated in her testimony before the U.S. Senate Committee on Woman Suffrage: "Though my coadjutors all believe in universal suffrage, yet I think we should be willing to let you start with spinsters and widows who are householder. Having homes of their own it is fair to suppose that they are industrious, common-sense women ... women who love their country (having no husbands to love) better than themselves." The Nineteenth Amendment would later establish women's suffrage irrespective of marital status or property in 1920.
- On February 14, 1893, Representative Lucas M. Miller proposed a constitutional amendment to change the country's name to "the United States of the Earth."

== 20th century ==
Constitutional amendment proposals considered in but not approved by Congress during the 20th century included the following:

- An amendment to abolish the Senate was proposed by Representative Victor Berger in 1911, due to his belief that it was corrupt as well as useless to the country as a whole. The amendment would have also shielded the unicameral House of Representatives' legislation from presidential veto and judicial review. At the time, Senators were still elected by state legislatures. The year after Berger proposed his amendment, Congress passed an amendment mandating popular election of Senators which was duly ratified by the several states.
- An anti-miscegenation amendment was proposed by Representative Seaborn Roddenbery, a Southern Democrat from Georgia, in 1912 to forbid interracial marriages nationwide. This was spurred when black boxer Jack Johnson garnered much publicity when he married a white woman, Lucille Cameron. Similar amendments were proposed by Congressman Andrew King, a Missourian Democrat, in 1871 and by Senator Coleman Blease, a South Carolinian Democrat, in 1928. None were passed by Congress, although numerous state legislatures passed laws prohibiting interracial marriage before they were ruled unconstitutional by the Supreme Court's 1967 Loving v. Virginia decision.
- An anti-polygamy amendment was proposed by Representative Frederick Gillett, a Massachusetts Republican, on January 24, 1914, and supported by former U.S. Senator from Utah, Frank J. Cannon, and by the National Reform Association. Utah was dominated by the LDS Church, which permitted plural marriage until 1890.
- The Ludlow Amendment was proposed by Representative Louis Ludlow in 1937. This amendment would have heavily reduced America's ability to be involved in war, requiring a national referendum to confirm any declaration of war. Public support for the amendment was very robust through the 1930s, a period when isolationism was the prevailing mood in the United States.
- A maximum wage amendment that no person should accumulate more than $1 million was proposed by Representative Wesley Lloyd in 1933. In the wake of the Wall Street Crash and the beginnings of the Great Depression many Americans believed that personal wealth should be limited to avoid such an issue from happening again.
- An amendment to limit investment income was proposed by Representative J. Buell Snyder in 1933.
- Multiple attempts to repeal the 21st Amendment ending Prohibition were proposed by Representative Morris Sheppard, introducer of the 18th Amendment originally banning alcoholic beverages, from 1935 to 1938, followed by attempt to outlaw drunkenness after his first proposals failed.
- The Bricker Amendment, proposed in 1951 by Ohio Senator John W. Bricker, would have limited the federal government's treaty-making power by prohibiting treaties from violating the U.S. Constitution and limiting executive agreements. Opposed by President Dwight Eisenhower, it failed twice to reach the threshold of two-thirds of voting members necessary for passage, the first time by eight votes and the second time by a single vote.
- A repeal of the Twenty-second Amendment would eliminate term limits for presidents. Presidents Harry S. Truman, Ronald Reagan, Bill Clinton, and Donald Trump all expressed support for some sort of repeal. The first efforts in Congress to repeal the 22nd Amendment were undertaken in 1956, only five years after its ratification. According to the Congressional Research Service, over the ensuing half-century (through 2008) 54 joint resolutions seeking to repeal the two-term presidential election limit were introduced; none were given serious consideration. The most recent attempt was launched by Republican Representative for Tennessee, Andy Ogles, in 2025, during the 119th United States Congress in order to permit presidents to run for three terms so long as the two previous terms were not consecutive.
- A School Prayer Amendment to establish that "the people retain the right to pray and to recognize their religious beliefs, heritage, and traditions on public property, including schools" was proposed by Robert Byrd of West Virginia in 1962, 1973, 1979, 1982, 1993, 1995, 1997, and 2006. Representative Ernest Istook, a Republican from Oklahoma's 5th congressional district, proposed the amendment in the House on May 8, 1997. In March 1998, the House Judiciary Committee passed the bill by a 16–11 vote. On June 4, 1998, the full House voted on the amendment, 224–203 in favor. The vote was 61 short of the required two-thirds majority.
- A Flag Desecration Amendment was first proposed in 1995 to give Congress the power to make acts such as flag burning illegal, seeking to supersede the 1990 Supreme Court case Texas v. Johnson, which ruled that such laws were unconstitutional. During each term of Congress from 1995 to 2005, the proposed amendment was passed by the House of Representatives, but never by the Senate, coming closest during voting on June 27, 2006, with 66 in support and 34 opposed (one vote short).
- The Bayh–Celler amendment was the closest the United States has come to passing an Electoral College abolition amendment. The amendment would have replaced the current Electoral College with a simpler two-round system modeled after French presidential elections. It was proposed during the 91st Congress (1969–1971). The House Judiciary Committee voted 28–6 to approve the proposal and was eventually passed by the full House with bipartisan support on September 18, 1969, by a vote of 339 to 70. The Senate commenced openly debating the proposal and the proposal was quickly filibustered. On September 17, 1970, a motion for cloture, which would have ended the filibuster, received 54 votes to 36 for cloture, failing to receive the then required a two-thirds majority of senators voting. Other proposals were made in 2005, 2009, and 2016, none of which were voted on by committee.
- The Human Life Amendment, first proposed in 1973, would overturn the Roe v. Wade court ruling and prohibit abortion. A total of 330 proposals using varying texts have been proposed with almost all dying in committee. The only version that reached a formal floor vote, the Hatch–Eagleton Amendment, was rejected by 18 votes in the Senate on June 28, 1983. The Roe v. Wade ruling was later overturned by the Supreme Court in Dobbs v. Jackson Women's Health Organization (2022), leaving individual states to regulate abortion.
- A balanced budget amendment, in which Congress and the President are forced to balance the budget every year, has been introduced many times, dating back to the 1930s. No measure passed either body of Congress until 1982, when the Senate took 11 days to consider it and gained the necessary two-thirds majority. The first and only time the House gave two-thirds approval to a balanced budget amendment was in 1995, when Members of the House of Representatives elected in the Republican Revolution voted for the Contract with America. That was also the last time the House held a floor or committee vote.
- Various proposed amendments for congressional term limits have been made since Supreme Court ruled state term limits on federal officials to be unconstitutional in the U.S. Term Limits, Inc. v. Thornton decision in 1995.
- The single subject amendment would introduce a single-subject rule blocking members of Congress from adding riders to bills.

== 21st century ==
Constitutional amendment proposals considered in but not approved by Congress thus far in the 21st century have included:

- The Equal Opportunity to Govern Amendment, proposed in July 2003 by Senator Orrin Hatch (R-Utah), would repeal the Constitution's natural born citizen clause, thus allowing naturalized citizens – who have been U.S. citizens for at least twenty years – to become President of the United States or Vice President. It was widely seen as an attempt to make California Governor Arnold Schwarzenegger (born in Austria and naturalized in 1983) eligible for the presidency and is sometimes nicknamed the "Arnold Amendment" or "Amend for Arnold".
- The Federal Marriage Amendment has been introduced in the United States Congress four times: in 2003, 2004, 2005/2006, and 2008 by multiple members of Congress. It would define marriage and prohibit same-sex marriage, even at the state level. The last Congressional vote on the proposed amendment occurred in the House of Representatives on July 18, 2006, when the motion failed 236–187, falling short of the 290 votes required for passage in that body. The Senate has voted only on cloture motions with regard to the proposed amendment, the last of which was on June 7, 2006, when the motion failed 49 to 48, falling short of the 60 votes required to allow the Senate to proceed to consideration of the proposal and the 67 votes required to send the proposed amendment to the states for ratification.
- Advocates for the Parental Rights Amendment to the United States Constitution said that it would allow parents' rights to direct the upbringing of their children, protected from federal interference and the United Nations Convention on the Rights of the Child. The Amendment was first proposed during the 110th Congress as House Joint Resolution 97 in July 2008, but no action was taken during that Congress.
- Various campaign finance reform amendments have been introduced in Congress since the United States Supreme Court's 2010 Citizens United v. Federal Election Commission ruling declaring that the First Amendment's free speech clause prohibits the federal government from restricting independent expenditures for communications by nonprofit corporations, for-profit corporations, labor unions, and other associations. The most recent version of the amendment was introduced in the 118th Congress by Representative Pramila Jayapal.
- Senator Marco Rubio and Representative Steven Palazzo proposed constitutional amendments barring the government from imposing taxes on refusal to purchase goods and services. The amendment would have invalidated the individual mandate of the Patient Protection and Affordable Care Act requiring legal persons to purchase health insurance.
- Representative Randy Neugebauer introduced an amendment requiring a two-thirds majority for Congress to raise the debt ceiling.
- Various proposals have been made for a constitutional amendment abolishing birthright citizenship for children of foreign nationals as a deterrent against illegal immigration. President Donald Trump endorsed a similar proposal during the 2016 presidential election.
- Representative Steve King introduced an amendment repealing the Sixteenth Amendment and abolishing the federal income tax.
- Representative John Culberson introduced an amendment altering Article V to limit any national convention convoked by the states to amend the Constitution to a single amendment and requiring Congress to authorize such a convention. This amendment, sometimes called the "Madison Amendment", would prevent a "runaway convention" from drastically altering or replacing the U.S. Constitution.
- Various proposals were made by Republican members of Congress to base congressional apportionments on the number of citizens in a state rather than residents following the Evenwel v. Abbott decision in 2016.
- Representative Al Green in 2017 introduced an amendment prohibiting the President of the United States from issuing a pardon for themselves.
- Representative Eliot Engel introduced an amendment prohibiting barriers to voting for adult Americans including "undue burden of proof of identity or citizenship", prohibiting foreign interference in elections and "undue or anonymous influence from any person", guaranteeing that electoral districts must be composed of geographically compact and contiguous territory, and designating Election Day as a national holiday unable to be altered by the government. The amendment was proposed after the Shelby County v. Holder case overruled parts of the Voting Rights Act of 1965 and in light of Russian interference in the 2016 United States elections. Many key aspects of the amendment were incorporated into the proposed For the People Act, which passed the U.S. House of Representatives.
- Representative Cedric Richmond introduced an amendment in the 116th Congress to repeal the penal exception clause from the Thirteenth Amendment, prohibiting unfree labor from being used as a punishment.
- Representative Tom Marino introduced an amendment to amend Article 1, Section 2 of the Constitution to change the terms of Representatives from two years to four (with elections to be held in non-presidential years) in 2019, but then resigned afterward. Proposals for extending the terms of House members date back to a similar proposal by Lyndon B. Johnson for 4-year terms, renewable in presidential years, in his 1966 State of the Union Address.
- Legal scholars Kimberlé Crenshaw and Catharine MacKinnon proposed the Equality Amendment in December of 2019 in the Yale Law Journal, as a modified version of the Equal Rights Amendment.
- In response to revived advocacy among progressive activists for expansion of the Supreme Court beyond the nine members it has had since 1869, Democratic Representative Collin Peterson and Republican Representative Denver Riggleman filed a proposed amendment in the 116th Congress to limit the Supreme Court membership to nine members maximum. A group of Republican congressmembers including Senators Ted Cruz and Thom Tillis proposed an identical amendment a few weeks later, in an entirely separate effort from that of Peterson and Riggleman. The constitution does not specify the number of justices, which has been changed seven times, sometimes for partisan reasons. The amendment, favored by Republicans (whose presidents have appointed a supermajority of justices), was voted on in the House of Representatives in September 2026, getting 212 votes in favor and 206 against, far less than the required two-thirds. One Democrat and all Republicans voted "yes" and one independent voted "no".
- President Joe Biden proposed an amendment, known as the No One Is Above the Law Amendment, to supersede the 2024 Supreme Court decision Trump v. United States, which granted presidents immunity for "official acts". The amendment would eliminate all "immunity for crimes a former president committed while in office". On July 25, Representative Joseph Morelle (D-NY) proposed a constitutional amendment to reverse the ruling, with the support of more than forty other members of Congress.

== See also ==
- List of amendments to the United States Constitution including both the ratified amendments and the unratified amendments
- Convention to propose amendments to the United States Constitution, the alternative processes whereby the Constitution may be altered
