= Grover Norquist =

American political activist (born 1956)

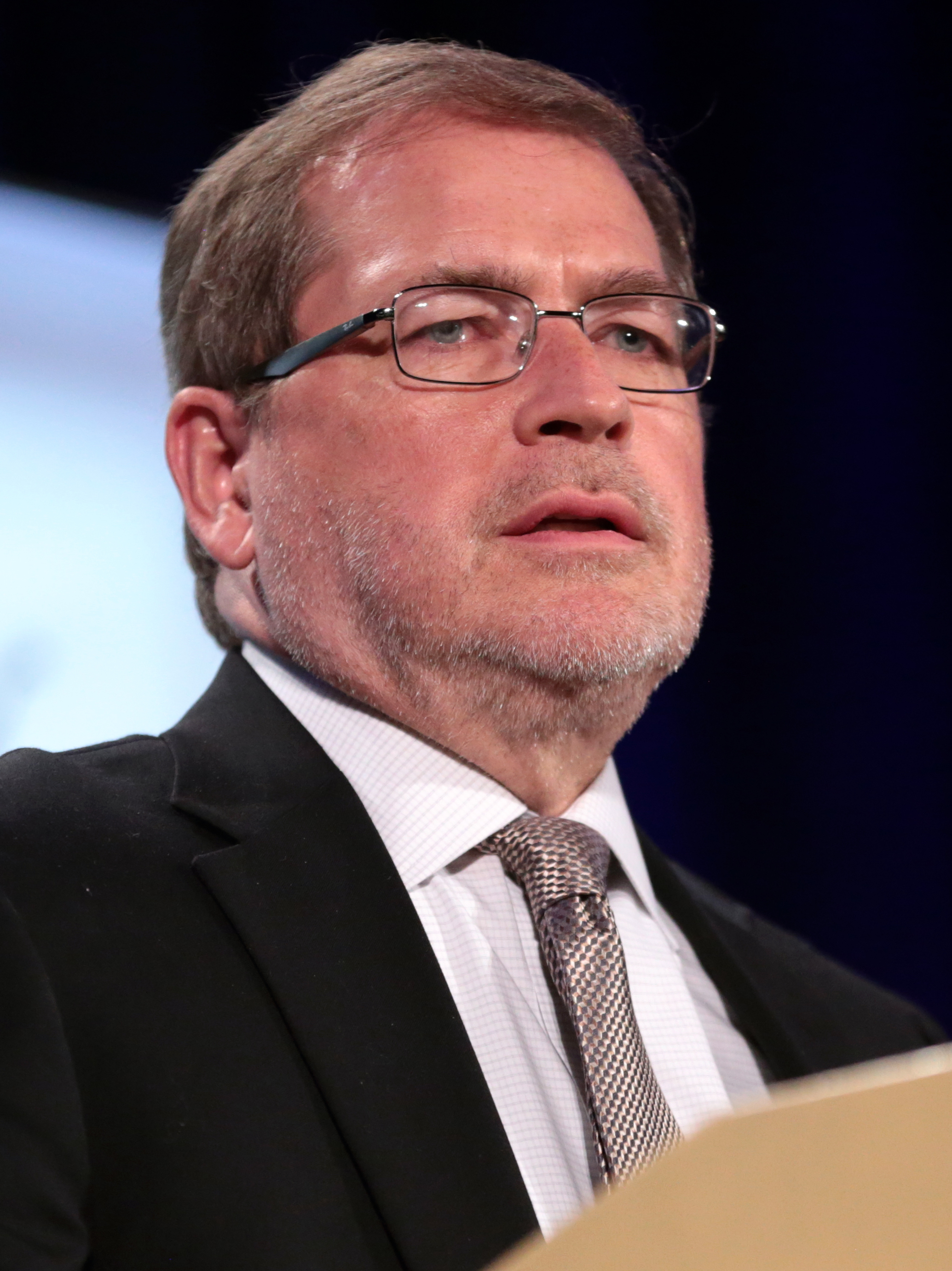
- Norquist in 2017
- Born: October 19, 1956 (age 70); Sharon, Pennsylvania, U.S.
- Education: Harvard University (AB, MBA)
- Organization: Americans for Tax Reform
- Political party: Republican
- Board member of: National Rifle Association, American Conservative Union
- Spouse: Samah Alrayyes (m. 2004)
- Children: 2
- Relatives: David Norquist (brother)

Grover Glenn Norquist (born October 19, 1956) is an American political activist and anti-tax advocate who is founder and president of Americans for Tax Reform, an organization that opposes all tax increases. A Republican, he is the primary promoter of the Taxpayer Protection Pledge, a pledge signed by lawmakers who agree to oppose increases in marginal income tax rates for individuals and businesses, and net reductions or eliminations of deductions and credits without a matching reduced tax rate. Prior to the November 2012 election, the pledge was signed by 95% of all Republican members of Congress and all but one of the candidates running for the 2012 Republican presidential nomination.

== Early life and education ==
Norquist was born in Sharon, Pennsylvania and grew up in Weston, Massachusetts. He is the son of Carol (née Lutz) and Warren Elliott Norquist, a vice president of Polaroid Corporation, and is of Swedish ancestry. His younger brother, David Norquist, has served in senior posts in Republican administrations at both the United States Department of Defense and the United States Department of Homeland Security and is president and CEO of the National Defense Industrial Association. Norquist became involved with politics at an early age when he volunteered for the 1968 Nixon campaign, assisting with get out the vote efforts. He graduated from Weston High School and enrolled at Harvard University in 1974, where he earned his B.A. and MBA.

At college, Norquist was an editor at the Harvard Crimson and helped to publish the libertarian-leaning Harvard Chronicle. He was a member of the Hasty Pudding Theatricals. Norquist has said: "When I became 21, I decided that nobody learned anything about politics after the age of 21." He attended the Leadership Institute in Arlington, Virginia, an organization that teaches conservative Americans how to influence public policy through activism and leadership.

== Career ==
=== Early career ===
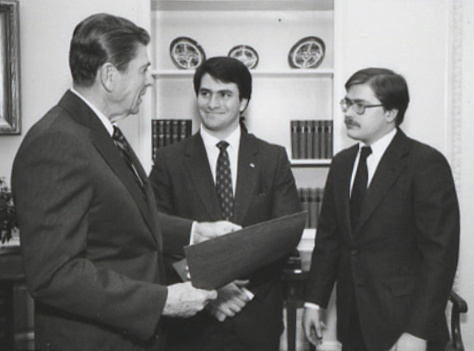
Ronald Reagan meeting with Jack Abramoff and Norquist in connection with the College Republican National Committee in 1981

Early in his career, Norquist was executive director of both the National Taxpayers Union and the national College Republicans, holding both positions until 1983. He was an economist and chief speechwriter at the United States Chamber of Commerce from 1983 to 1984. Norquist traveled to several war zones to help support anti-Soviet guerrilla armies in the second half of the 1980s. He worked with a support network for Oliver North's efforts with the Nicaraguan Contras and other insurgencies, in addition to promoting U.S. support for groups including Mozambique's RENAMO and Jonas Savimbi's UNITA in Angola, and helping to organize anti-Soviet forces in Laos.

In 1985, Norquist went to a conference in South Africa sponsored by South African businesses called the "Youth for Freedom Conference", which sought to bring American and South African conservatives together to end the anti-apartheid movement. Norquist represented the France-Albert Rene government of Seychelles as a lobbyist from 1995 until 1999. Norquist's efforts were the subject of Tucker Carlson's 1997 article in The New Republic, "What I sold at the revolution."

=== Americans for Tax Reform ===
Norquist founded Americans for Tax Reform (ATR) in 1985, which he says was done at the request of then-President Ronald Reagan. Referring to Norquist's activities as head of ATR, Steve Kroft, in a 60 Minutes episode that aired on November 20, 2011, claimed that "Norquist has been responsible, more than anyone else, for rewriting the dogma of the Republican Party."

The primary policy goal of Americans for Tax Reform is to reduce government revenues as a percentage of the GDP. ATR states that it "opposes all tax increases as a matter of principle." Americans for Tax Reform has supported Taxpayer Bill of Rights (TABOR) legislation and transparency initiatives, while opposing efforts to regulate health care.

In 1993, Norquist launched his Wednesday Meeting series at ATR headquarters, initially to help fight President Clinton's healthcare plan. The meeting eventually became one of the most significant institutions in American conservative political organizing. The meetings have been called "a must-attend event for Republican operatives fortunate enough to get an invitation", and "the Grand Central station of the conservative movement." Medvetz (2006) argues that the meetings have been significant in "establishing relations of ... exchange" among conservative subgroups and "sustaining a moral community of conservative activists."

As a nonprofit organization, Americans for Tax Reform is not required to disclose the identity of its contributors. Critics, such as Sen. Alan Simpson, have asked Norquist to disclose his contributors; he has declined but has said that ATR is financed by direct mail and other grassroots fundraising efforts. According to CBS News, "a significant portion appears to come from wealthy individuals, foundations and corporate interests."

=== Taxpayer Protection Pledge ===
Prior to the November 2012 election, 238 of 242 House Republicans and 41 out of 47 Senate Republicans had signed ATR's "Taxpayer Protection Pledge", in which the pledger promises to "oppose any and all efforts to increase the marginal income tax rate for individuals and business; and to oppose any net reduction or elimination of deductions and credits, unless matched dollar for dollar by further reducing tax rates."

The November 6, 2012 elections resulted in a decline in the number of Taxpayer Protection Pledge signatories in both the upper and lower houses of the 113th Congress: from 41 to 39 in the Senate, and from 238 to "fewer than ... 218" in the House of Representatives. According to journalist Alex Seitz-Wald, losses in the election by Norquist supporters and the "fiscal cliff" have emboldened and made more vocal critics of Norquist.

In November 2011, Senate Majority leader Harry Reid (D-NV) blamed Norquist's influence for the Joint Select Committee on Deficit Reduction's lack of progress, claiming that Congressional Republicans "are being led like puppets by Grover Norquist. They're giving speeches that we should compromise on our deficit, but never do they compromise on Grover Norquist. He is their leader." Since Norquist's pledge binds signatories to opposing deficit reduction agreements that include any element of increased tax revenue, some Republican deficit hawks now retired from office have stated that Norquist has become an obstacle to deficit reduction. Former Republican Senator Alan Simpson (R-WY), co-chairman of the National Commission on Fiscal Responsibility and Reform, has been particularly critical, describing Norquist's position as "[n]o taxes, under any situation, even if your country goes to hell."

== Other political activities ==
=== National politics ===
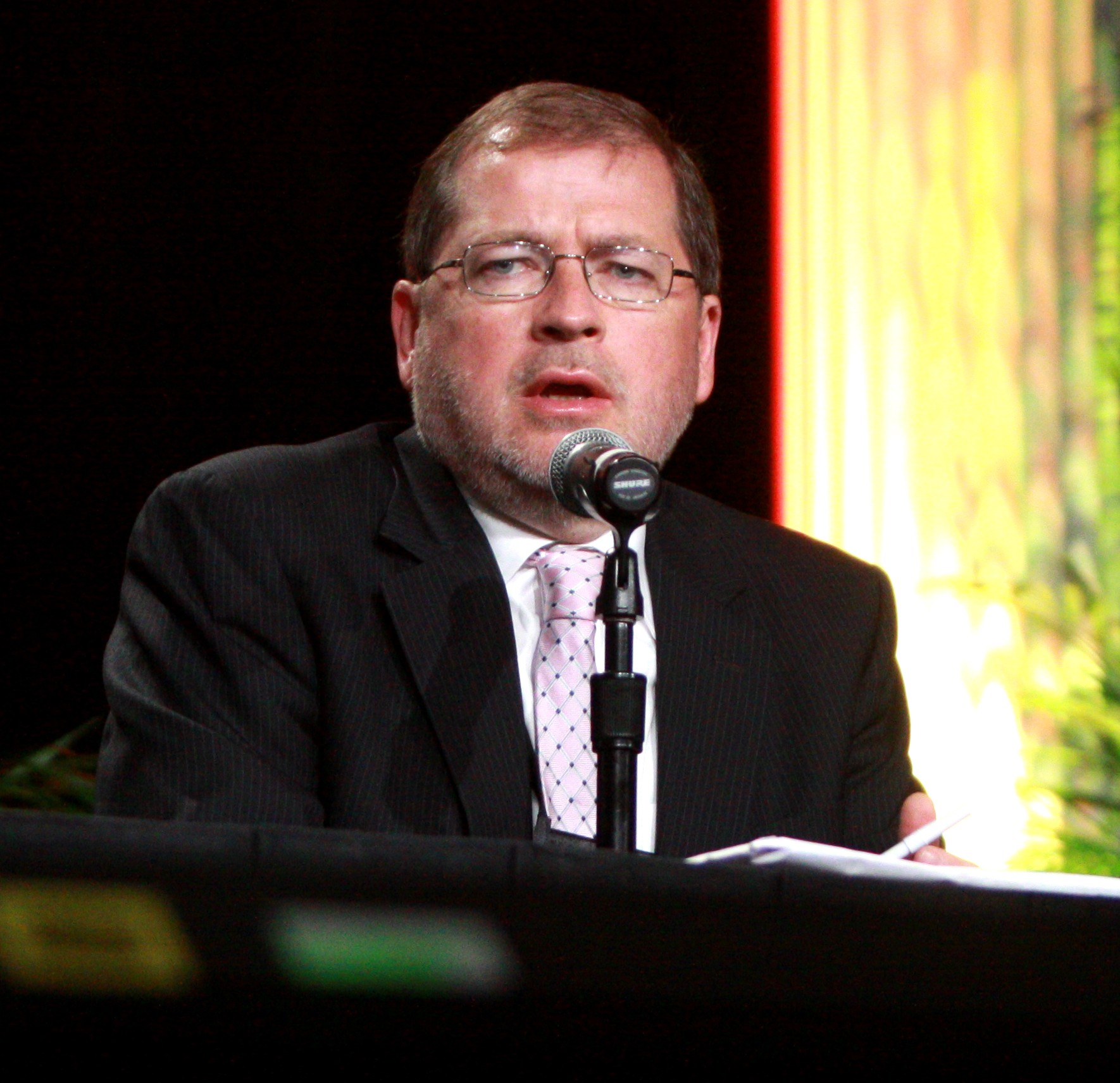
Norquist in 2013

Norquist was listed as one of the five primary leaders of the post-Goldwater conservative movement by Nina Easton in her 2000 book, Gang of Five. Working with eventual Speaker Newt Gingrich, Norquist was one of the co-authors of the 1994 Contract with America, and helped to rally grassroots efforts, which Norquist later chronicled in his book Rock the House. Norquist also served as a campaign staff member on the 1988, 1992 and 1996 Republican Platform Committees.

Norquist was instrumental in securing early support for the presidential campaign of then-Texas Governor George W. Bush, acting as his unofficial liaison to the conservative movement. He campaigned for Bush in both 2000 and 2004. After Bush's first election, Norquist was a key figure involved in crafting Bush's tax cuts. John Fund of The Wall Street Journal dubbed Norquist "the Grand Central Station" of conservatism and told The Nation: "It's not disputable" that Norquist was the key to the Bush campaign's surprising level of support from movement conservatives in 2000.

Norquist has been active in building bridges between various ethnic and religious minorities and the free market community through his involvement with Acton Institute, Christian Coalition and Toward Tradition. He has also "announced his plan to assemble a center-right coalition to discuss pulling out of Afghanistan to save hundreds of billions of dollars."

Norquist is active in Tea Party politics. Speaking to a Florida rally, he said "tea party groups should serve as the 'exoskeleton' that protects newly elected Republicans" from pressures to increase government spending. Comprehensive immigration reform is an interest of Norquist's, who believes that the United States should have "dramatically higher levels of immigration" than it does.

=== Involvement with Jack Abramoff ===
According to a 2011 memoir by former lobbyist Jack Abramoff, Norquist was one of Abramoff's first major Republican party contacts. Norquist and Americans for Tax Reform were also mentioned in Senate testimony relating to the Jack Abramoff Indian lobbying scandal, which resulted in a 2006 guilty plea by Abramoff to three criminal felony counts of defrauding of American Indian tribes and corrupting public officials. Records released by the Senate Indian Affairs Committee allege that ATR served as a "conduit" for funds that flowed from Abramoff's clients to surreptitiously finance grassroots lobbying campaigns. Norquist denied that he did anything wrong, and has not been charged with any crime.

=== State and local politics ===
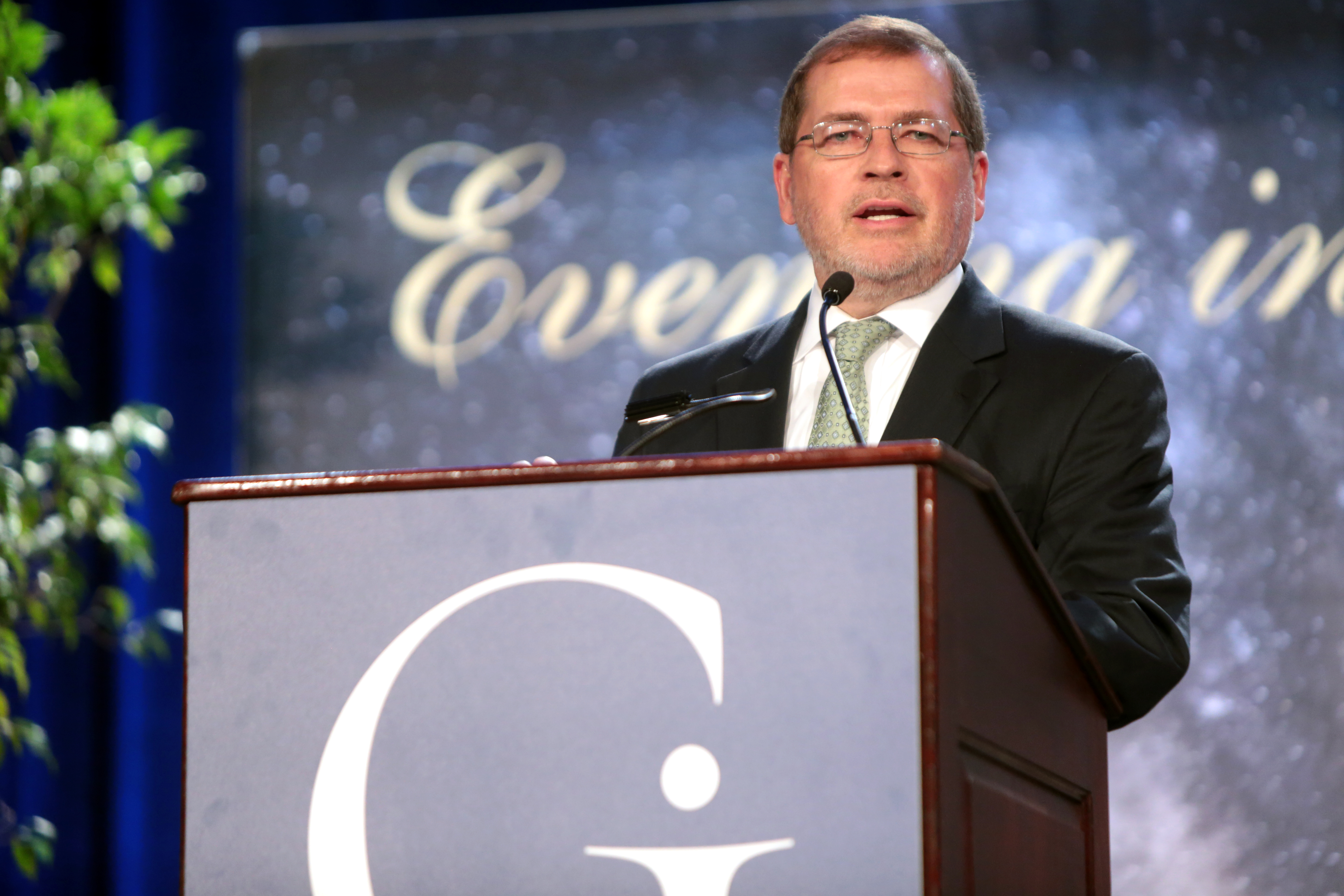
Norquist in 2016

Norquist's national strategy has included recruiting state and local politicians to support ATR's stance on taxes. Norquist has helped to set up regular meetings for conservatives in many states. These meetings are modeled after his Wednesday meetings in Washington, with the goal of creating a nationwide network of conservative activists that he can call upon to support conservative causes, such as tax cuts and deregulation. By 2005, there were meetings in 43 states.

In 2004, Norquist helped California Governor Arnold Schwarzenegger with his plan to privatize the CalPERS system. In Virginia's 2005 Republican primaries, Norquist encouraged the defeat of a number of legislators who voted for higher taxes.

=== Boards and other activities ===
Norquist serves on the boards of directors of numerous organizations including the National Rifle Association, the American Conservative Union, the Hispanic Leadership Fund, the Indian-American Republican Caucus, and ParentalRights.org, an organization that wishes to add a Parental Rights Amendment to the United States Constitution.

In 2010, Norquist joined the advisory board of GOProud, a political organization representing lesbian, gay, bisexual, and transgender conservatives and their allies, for which he was criticized by the Family Research Council. Norquist also sits on a six-person advisory panel that nominates Time's Person of the Year. In business, Norquist was a co-founder of the Merritt Group, later renamed Janus-Merritt Strategies. He is a member of the Council on Foreign Relations. In 2020, Norquist signed the Madrid Charter, a document drafted by the conservative Spanish political party Vox that describes left-wing groups as enemies of Ibero-America involved in a "criminal project" that are "under the umbrella of the Cuban regime".

== Views on government ==
Norquist favors dramatically reducing the size of government. He has been noted for his widely quoted quip from a 2001 interview with NPR's Morning Edition:

"I don’t want to abolish government. I simply want to reduce it to the size where I can drag it into the bathroom and drown it in the bathtub."

Journalist William Greider quotes Norquist saying his goal is to bring America back to what it was "up until Teddy Roosevelt, when the socialists took over. The income tax, the death tax, regulation, all that." When asked by journalist Steve Kroft about the goal of chopping government "in half and then shrink it again to where we were at the turn of the [20th] century" before Social Security and Medicare, Norquist replied, "We functioned in this country with government at eight percent of GDP for a long time and quite well."

Some smaller government advocates argue that Norquist's "obsession with tax revenue" is actually counterproductive with respect to minimizing the size of government. Although the Americans for Tax Reform mission statement is "The government's power to control one's life derives from its power to tax. We believe that power should be minimized", critics at the Cato Institute have argued that "holding the line on taxes constrains only one of the four tools (taxes, tax deductions, spending without taxation, and regulation) used by government to alter economic outcomes."

Norquist published Leave Us Alone: Getting the Government's Hands Off Our Money, Our Guns, Our Lives, in 2008. In 2012, he published Debacle: Obama's War on Jobs and Growth and What We Can Do Now to Regain Our Future, with John R. Lott Jr. He has served as a monthly "Politics" columnist and contributing editor to The American Spectator. Norquist has called for reductions in defense spending as one way to reduce the size of government. He has endorsed a non-interventionist foreign policy and cuts to the U.S. military budget.

== Personal life ==
Norquist has described himself as a "boring white bread Methodist." In 2004, at age 48, he married Samah Alrayyes, a public relations specialist and was formerly a director of the Islamic Free Market Institute and a specialist at the Bureau of Legislative and Public Affairs at U.S. Agency for International Development (USAID). The couple has two daughters, one of whom is adopted from the city of Bethlehem. According to friend and former roommate John Fund, Norquist's devotion to his political causes is "monk-like" and comparable to that of Ralph Nader.

Norquist has competed three times in the comedy fundraiser "Washington's Funniest Celebrity" and placed second in 2009. Humorist P. J. O'Rourke has described Norquist as "Tom Paine crossed with Lee Atwater plus just a soupçon of Madame Defarge". Norquist and his wife attended the annual Burning Man festival in Black Rock, Nevada in August 2014. Norquist explained that he wished to attend because, "There's no government that organizes this. That's what happens when nobody tells you what to do. You just figure it out. So Burning Man is a refutation of the argument that the state has a place in nature."

== Writings ==
- Rock the House. Ft. Lauderdale, Fla: VYTIS Press, 1995. ISBN 978-0-9645786-0-9
- Taxes: The Economic & Philosophical Necessity of Real Reform. Minneapolis, MN: Center of the American Experiment, 1996. OCLC 37889749
- "America is freedom" chapter from Deaver, Michael K. Why I Am a Reagan Conservative, Chapter New York: W. Morrow, 2005. ISBN 978-0-06-055976-2
- Leave Us Alone: Getting the Government's Hands Off Our Money, Our Guns, Our Lives. New York, NY: W. Morrow, 2008. ISBN 978-0-06-113395-4
- Debacle: Obama's War on Jobs and Growth and What We Can Do Now to Regain Our Future. Hoboken, NJ: John Wiley & Sons, Inc., 2012. ISBN 978-1-118-18617-6

== See also ==
- Democratic International
- K Street Project
- Starve the beast
