= Equality Act (United States) =

2025 congressional bill

- Long title: To prohibit discrimination on the basis of sex, gender identity, and sexual orientation, and for other purposes.
- Announced in: the 119th United States Congress
- Number of co-sponsors: 217

Legislative history
- Introduced in the House of Representatives as H.R. 15 by Mark Takano (D–CA) on April 29, 2025; Committee consideration by House Judiciary

The Equality Act is a bill in the United States Congress, that, if passed, would amend the Civil Rights Act of 1964 (including titles II, III, IV, VI, VII, and IX) to prohibit discrimination on the basis of sex, sexual orientation and gender identity in employment, housing, public accommodations, education, federally funded programs, credit, and jury service. The Supreme Court's June 2020 ruling in Bostock v. Clayton County protects gay and transgender people in matters of employment, but not in other respects. The Bostock ruling also covered the Altitude Express and Harris Funeral Homes cases.

The bill would also expand existing civil rights protections for people of color by prohibiting discrimination in more public accommodations, such as exhibitions, goods and services, and transportation.

Much like the Bostock v. Clayton County decision, the Equality Act broadly defines sex discrimination to include sexual orientation and gender identity, adding "pregnancy, childbirth, or a related medical condition of an individual, as well as because of sex-based stereotypes". The intended purpose of the act is to legally protect individuals from discrimination based on such.

While various similar bills have been proposed since the 1970s, the modern version of the Equality Act was first proposed in the 114th United States Congress. During the 116th Congress, it passed the United States House of Representatives on May 17, 2019, in a bipartisan 236–173 vote. However, the United States Senate did not act upon the bill after receiving it; even if they had, then-President Donald Trump signaled that he would have vetoed it. On February 18, 2021, the act was reintroduced in the 117th Congress. The House passed the act by a vote of 224 to 206 on February 25, 2021, with support from three Republicans. The bill then moved on to the Senate for consideration, but did not overcome a filibuster, and did not advance further.

== Purpose and content ==
The Equality Act would uniformly apply anti-LGBTQ discrimination law in the United States. State anti-discrimination laws as of May 2019: State law prohibiting discrimination based on sexual orientation and gender identity in public employment, private employment, housing, and provision of goods and services State law prohibiting discrimination based on sexual orientation (but not gender identity) in public employment, private employment, housing, and provision of goods and services State law prohibiting discrimination based on sexual orientation and gender identity in public and private employment, but not in other areas such as housing and provision of goods and services State law does not prohibit discrimination based on sexual orientation or gender identity. Some states have similar executive orders, but their scope is limited to only cover public state employees against discrimination.

As of 2026, twenty-seven states lacked laws prohibiting discrimination based on sexual orientation or gender identity. At the federal level, statutory protections for lesbian, gay, bisexual, transgender, and queer (LGBTQ) individuals remained limited. According to survey data, approximately two-thirds of LGBTQ Americans reported having experienced discrimination in their personal lives. The Equality Act, if enacted, would extend anti-discrimination protections to LGBTQ individuals nationwide by applying existing civil rights frameworks at the federal level.

The Equality Act seeks to incorporate protections against LGBTQ discrimination into the federal Civil Rights Act of 1964. Specifically, it prohibits discrimination based on sex, sexual orientation, gender identity, and intersex status in a wide variety of areas including public accommodations and facilities, education, federally funded programs, employment, housing, credit, and jury service.

It also seeks to expand existing civil rights protections for people of color, women, and other minority groups by updating the definition of public accommodations to include places or establishments that provide:

- Exhibition, entertainment, recreation, exercise, amusement, public gathering, or public display
- Goods, services, or programs
- Transportation services

According to the text of the Act as introduced in the 117th Congress, discrimination based on sexual orientation or gender identity by governments violates the Equal Protection Clause of the Fourteenth Amendment, saying:

Discrimination by State and local governments on the basis of sexual orientation or gender identity in employment, housing, and public accommodations, and in programs and activities receiving Federal financial assistance, violates the Equal Protection Clause of the Fourteenth Amendment to the Constitution of the United States. In many circumstances, such discrimination also violates other constitutional rights such as those of liberty and privacy under the due process clause of the Fourteenth Amendment.

== History ==
=== Early history (1970s–1990s) ===
The original Equality Act was developed by U.S. Representatives Bella Abzug (D-NY) and Ed Koch (D-NY) in 1974. The Equality Act of 1974 (H.R. 14752 of the 93rd Congress) sought to amend the Civil Rights Act of 1964 to include prohibition of discrimination on the basis of sex, sexual orientation, and marital status in federally assisted programs, housing sales, rentals, financing, and brokerage services. The bill authorized civil actions by the Attorney General of the United States in cases of discrimination on account of sex, sexual orientation, or marital status in public facilities and public education. The bill was never voted on by the House.

From 1994, the more narrow Employment Non-Discrimination Act (ENDA) was introduced, but faced opposition over whether transgender Americans would be protected. An expanded version of ENDA which included both sexual orientation and changed sex to gender identity in its protections passed the United States Senate in 2013, but did not advance in the House.

=== Bostock v. Clayton County, Georgia (2020) ===
On June 15, 2020, the United States Supreme Court ruled that Title VII of the Civil Rights Act of 1964 prohibits discrimination against gay and transgender people in employment. LGBTQ rights advocates welcomed the ruling and reaffirmed support for passage of the Equality Act, stating that the ruling only covered employment, and in many states LGBTQ people still lack non-discrimination protections in housing, public accommodations, public education, federal funding, credit, and jury service which would be covered under the Equality Act. The ruling said that the Civil Rights Act protects "gay and transgender" people in matters of employment but left the terms undefined.

== Public opinion ==
A Reuters/Ipsos poll conducted in May/June 2019 found that most Americans do not know that LGBT people lack federal protections. Only one-third of respondents knew that such protections do not exist on the basis of transgender identity, and only one-quarter knew that they do not exist on the basis of lesbian, gay, and bisexual identity.

A nationwide and state-by-state poll on the issue conducted throughout 2017 by the Public Religion Research Institute as part of its annual American Values Atlas survey said that 70% of Americans, including a majority in every state, supported laws that would protect LGBTQ people against discrimination, while 23% opposed such laws, and 8% had no opinion. A 2020 PRRI poll said 83% of Americans would favor such anti-discrimination laws, and specifically regarding discrimination in employment, housing, and public accommodations. 16% of Americans oppose such laws. Support for such anti-discrimination laws was at 94% for Democrats, 85% for independents, and 68% for Republicans. According to a 2021 PRRI survey, about 22% of Americans support religious exemptions for business owners pertaining to anti-discrimination law based on sexual orientation, while about 76% of Americans oppose such exemptions.

A poll conducted by Quinnipiac University in April 2019 found that 92% of American voters believed that employers should not be allowed to fire someone based on their sexual orientation or sexual identity, while only 6% believed that employers should be allowed to do so. A wide consensus on this question was found among both Democratic and Republican voters, as well as Independents, although Democratic voters were slightly more likely to believe that this kind of discrimination should be illegal, with only 1% of them believing that employers should be allowed to fire someone based on their sexual orientation or sexual identity.

== Support and opposition ==
=== Support ===
The Equality Act is supported by more than 547 national, state and local organizations.

Organizations related to human rights and social justice: American Civil Liberties Union (ACLU), Anti-Defamation League, GLSEN, Human Rights Campaign, Human Rights Watch, Southern Poverty Law Center (SPLC), Lambda Legal, the Navajo Nation, National Organization for Women, NAACP, and AARP.

Calling for the bill's passage in 2016, civil rights icon John Lewis said, "This legislation is what justice requires. This legislation is what justice demands. And like the Supreme Court's recent decision, it is long overdue ... We are a society committed to equal justice under the law. ... We have fought too hard and too long against discrimination based on race and color not to stand up against discrimination based on sexual orientation and gender identity."

National professional organizations: American Psychological Association, American Medical Association, American Counseling Association, American Federation of Teachers, American Bar Association, American Academy of Pediatrics, and the National PTA.

American businesses: Apple, Google, Microsoft, Amazon, eBay, IBM, Facebook, Airbnb, Twitter, Intel, Red Hat, Netflix, 3M, Kellogg's, Visa, Starbucks, Mastercard, Johnson & Johnson, Alaska Airlines, American Airlines, and the US Chamber of Commerce.

Celebrities: Alexandra Billings, Karamo Brown, Gloria Calderón Kellett, Charlie Carver, Max Carver, Nyle DiMarco, Sally Field, Marcia Gay Harden, Dustin Lance Black, Jamie Lee Curtis, Jane Lynch, Justina Machado, Adam Rippon, Taylor Swift, Bella Thorne, and Jesse Tyler Ferguson.

Feminist and women's groups: National Organization for Women, 9to5: the National Association of Working Women, the Coalition of Labor Union Women, Feminist Majority, Girls, Inc., Jewish Women International, The National Black Women's Reproductive Justice Agenda, NARAL, MANA, A National Latina Organization, MomsRising, National Alliance to End Sexual Violence, National Asian Pacific American Women's Forum (NAPAWF), National Association for Female Executives, National Women's Health Network, National Women's Law Center, Planned Parenthood, Positive Women's Network-USA, and United State of Women. The Women's Sports Foundation, the Women's National Basketball Players Association (WNBPA), Athlete Ally, along with Megan Rapinoe, Billie Jean King, Candace Parker and 176 current and former athletes in women's sports have spoken up for full LGBTQ inclusion in sports, including of transgender athletes.

Religious groups: The Episcopal Church, The United Methodist Church, The United Church of Christ, the Evangelical Lutheran Church in America, More Light Presbyterians, African American Ministers in Action, The Association of Welcoming and Affirming Baptists, The Union for Reform Judaism, United Synagogue of Conservative Judaism, the Reconstructionist Rabbinical Association, Muslims for Progressive Values, the Hindu American Foundation, and the Unitarian Universalist Association.

=== Opposition ===
Numerous political pundits and politicians have stated their opposition to the Equality Act at various times. Notable among these was Representative Marjorie Taylor Greene (R-GA), which caused a brief political feud between her and Representative Marie Newman (D-IL). Greene had said in a speech that the proposed act "destroys God's creation, ... completely annihilates women's rights and religious freedoms", and "puts trans rights above women's rights".

Fox News anchor, Tucker Carlson, called the Equality Act a "terrifying agenda that eliminates women". Candace Owens appeared on Carlson's Fox News talk show in the same segment and said that Democrats "don't know what equality is" in regards the Equality Act

Some single-issue women's groups have opposed the provision of the bill which defines sex to include gender identity. Some groups say that the provision endangers the "sex-based rights" of women and girls, including women's sports and women-only spaces such as locker rooms, prisons, and shelters. Among these groups have been: the Women's Human Rights Campaign USA (WHRC USA), the Women's Liberation Front (WoLF), Feminists in Struggle (FiST), Standing for Women, and Save Women's Sports. These organizations oppose the bill unless it is amended to protect sex and not gender identity. Both WHRC USA and FIST have proposed amendments to the act, not recognizing gender identity. Some organizations that oppose the Equality Act are funded by fundamentalists, such as the Alliance Defending Freedom.

Georgia State University criminology professor Callie H. Burt published a paper in the June 2020 issue of Feminist Criminology in which she examined the potential effects of the Equality Act on women's rights. While saying the act is "laudable in its aims", Burt lamented the lack of scrutiny and discussion by Democratic representatives in Congress into the real consequences the act's "imprecise language" would bring to women: "The result is the erosion of females' provisions, which include sex-separated spaces (e.g., prisons, locker rooms, shelters), opportunities and competitions (e.g., awards, scholarships, sports), and events (e.g., meetings, groups, festivals)". She also said, "I submit that the bill, in current form, fails to strike a balance between the rights, needs, and interests of two marginalized (and overlapping) groups—trans people and females—and instead prioritizes the demands of trans people over the hard-won rights of female people."

The Economist, a British newspaper, stated in October 2020 that the original draft of the act endangers the rights of women in areas such as sports, where they would be at a physical disadvantage having to compete against trans women. When it comes to biological-sex segregated spaces, such as public bathrooms and prisons, the newspaper states that "parts of the bill appear to put the needs of transgender people above those of women. This is because the act redefines 'sex' in Title IX and other amendments of the Civil Rights Act to include 'gender identity; rather than making transgenderism a protected category of its own. Its definition of 'gender identity' is fuzzy and appears to downplay the reality of sex."

Law professor Douglas Laycock told NPR that the law is "less necessary" now, after the Bostock decision, and that the bill "protects the rights of one side, but attempts to destroy the rights of the other side."

Some religious leaders oppose the bill for various reasons, saying for example that it would infringe on religious liberty.

On March 20, 2019, the United States Conference of Catholic Bishops sent a letter addressed to the United States Senate that opposed the Equality Act on the grounds of freedom of expression and freedom of religion, among other concerns.

The American Family Association published an article in April 2019 opposing the act.

On May 7, 2019, a coalition of Christian organizations sent a letter to the House of Representatives stating their opposition to the Equality Act. In the letter, the groups expressed that the act "undermines religious freedom, and threatens charitable nonprofits and the people they serve, regulates free speech, hinders quality health care, and endangers the privacy and safety of women and girls." In addition to four committee chairs of the U.S. Conference of Catholic Bishops, signers included leaders from the Christian Legal Society, the Center for Law and Religious Freedom, the Center for Public Justice, the National Association of Evangelicals, the Ethics & Religious Liberty Commission of the Southern Baptist Convention, the Lutheran Center for Religious Liberty (affiliated with the Lutheran Church-Missouri Synod), the Council for Christian Colleges and Universities, and the Institutional Religious Freedom Alliance.

Bill Donohue, president of the Catholic League for Religious and Civil Rights, said that "The Equality Act is the most comprehensive assault on religious liberty, the right to life, and privacy rights ever packaged into one bill." Donohue also stated his concern that "Catholic hospitals would no longer be allowed to govern as Catholic facilities, threatening healthcare for everyone, especially the poor."

On May 13, 2019, The Church of Jesus Christ of Latter-day Saints released a statement that read in part, "The Equality Act now before Congress is not balanced and does not meet the standard of fairness for all. While providing extremely broad protections for LGBT rights, the Equality Act provides no protections for religious freedom". In 2021, the LDS Church endorsed a competing bill, the Fairness for All Act. The competing bill would add faith-based exemptions to anti-discrimination law. Other than the LDS Church, its supporters have included the Seventh-day Adventist Church and the Council for Christian Colleges and Universities.

On May 16, 2019, Sister Carol Keehan, president of the Catholic Health Association sent a letter to lawmakers in the House expressing concern that the act, as written, would roll back religious liberty protections. "Federal law has long recognized that certain services can present conflict for some faith-based health care providers with religious or moral objections to providing those services, and protected them from having to do so. We are concerned that the Equality Act omits and could erode or reduce those protections." The legislation, she said, "lacks conscience protection language and precludes application of RFRA (Religious Freedom Restoration Act)."

The Heritage Foundation has argued that the act would adversely affect five groups of people: employers and workers; medical professionals; parents and children; non-profit organizations and their volunteers; and women. The foundation has also described specific harms that it believes each group would experience from the act's passage.

== Transgender rights and the Equality Act ==
Much of the concern surrounding the Equality Act stems from the protections that would be guaranteed for transgender individuals in sports and also in access to sex-segregated spaces. It is claimed that these protections would endanger women in sex-segregated spaces such as bathrooms and prisons. However, the National Taskforce to End Sexual and Domestic Violence and over 250 anti-sexual assault organizations have condemned opponents' attempts to portray transgender people as sexual predators and contends it is untrue that protections for transgender people endanger women's safety and privacy. The Taskforce's joint letter was signed by over 250 survivor organizations in full support of full and equal access for the transgender community, including in restrooms and locker rooms. The letter notes the [21] states and 200+ municipalities that have protected transgender people's access to facilities have not seen an increase in sexual violence and public safety incidents due to nondiscrimination laws. The letter also notes that anti-transgender initiatives put transgender people at further risk of assault.

Religious organizations that have expressed their support for the act claim that this act would protect transgender children and people; however, this has been overshadowed by the strong opposition by other religious groups and organizations. Religious organizations and registered charities that have given public support to the act include Advocates for Youth, and various Catholic leaders and lobbying organizations such as Father James Martin S.J., Network, and DignityUSA. Catholic theologian and nun Joan Chittister released a statement saying that the Equality Act "must be passed, must be extended, and must be lived if religion itself is to be true". The Interfaith Alliance endorsed the Equality Act as part of "Faith for Equality", a coalition which provided a letter signed by over 17,000 religious Americans to Senator Chris Coons in support of the act.

Edith Guffey, a UCC minister and mother of a transgender, non-binary child testified to Congress in support of the Equality Act, saying "We should all be able to agree on this one thing, the law should treat all our children, God's children, equally. All of our children deserve to be treated with and respect. Every single one of us would go to the mat for our children. None of us wants them to be turned away or discriminated against for any reason."

At a 2021 Senate hearing for the Equality Act, 16-year-old Stella Keating became the first transgender teenager to testify before Congress saying, "Right now, I could be denied medical care or be evicted for simply being transgender in many states. ... What if I'm offered a dream job in a state where I can be discriminated against? Even if my employer is supportive, I still have to live somewhere. Eat in restaurants. Have a doctor", she added. "This is the United States of America. The country that I love. Every young person ... regardless of who they are or who they love, should be able to be excited about their future."

== Presidents' stances ==
=== Barack Obama ===
President Obama and Vice President Biden voiced support for the Equality Act when it was first introduced in the 114th United States Congress.

=== Donald Trump ===
The Trump Administration opposed the Equality Act. In August 2019, the White House issued a statement, "The Trump Administration absolutely opposes discrimination of any kind and supports the equal treatment of all; however, the House-passed bill in its current form is filled with poison pills that threaten to undermine parental and conscience rights."

=== Joe Biden ===
President Biden and Vice President Harris were vocal defenders of the Equality Act, issuing a statement from the White House, "I applaud Congressman David Cicilline and the entire Congressional Equality Caucus for introducing the Equality Act in the House of Representatives yesterday, and I urge Congress to swiftly pass this historic legislation. Every person should be treated with dignity and respect, and this bill represents a critical step toward ensuring that America lives up to our foundational values of equality and freedom for all."

In March 2022 President Biden called for the passage of the Equality Act during the State Of The Union. On the March 2022 Trans Day of Visibility, the Biden administration announced that it was fighting for the passage of the Equality Act to advance the civil rights of trans Americans.

== Legislative activity ==
=== 114th Congress ===
On July 23, 2015, Rep. David Cicilline (D-RI) introduced H.R. 3185, the Equality Act of 2015, in the United States House of Representatives. The bill was supported by President Barack Obama. In January 2016, Rep. Bob Dold (R-IL) became the first Republican Representative to co-sponsor the bill. Rep. Ileana Ros-Lehtinen (R-FL) became the second Republican to co-sponsor the bill in September 2016. Jenniffer González (R-PR) also co-sponsored the bill.

On July 23, 2015, Sen. Jeff Merkley (D-OR) introduced S. 1858, the Equality Act of 2015, in the United States Senate. In January 2016, Sen. Mark Kirk (R-IL) became the first and only Republican Senator to co-sponsor the bill. All Democrats and Independents cosponsored the bill with the exception of Heidi Heitkamp (D-ND), Joe Donnelly (D-IN), Joe Manchin (D-WV) and Jon Tester (D-MT).

=== 115th Congress ===
On May 2, 2017, Rep. David Cicilline (D-RI) introduced H.R. 2282, the Equality Act of 2017, in the United States House of Representatives. Rep. Ileana Ros-Lehtinen (R-FL) was the only Republican to co-sponsor the bill from the outset, with Rep. Scott Taylor (R-VA) becoming the second Republican to co-sponsor the bill on May 26, 2017.

On May 2, 2017, Sen. Jeff Merkley (D-OR) introduced S. 1006, the Equality Act of 2017, in the United States Senate. All Democrats and Independents cosponsored the bill with the exceptions of Joe Donnelly (D-IN) and Joe Manchin (D-WV).

=== 116th Congress ===
On March 13, 2019, Rep. David Cicilline (D-RI) introduced H.R. 5, the Equality Act of 2019, in the United States House of Representatives. The bill is sponsored by 237 Democrats and 3 Republicans. On May 1, 2019, the bill passed the House Judiciary Committee by a vote of 22–10, with all Democratic members of the committee voting in favor and all Republican members against. A vote by the full House was held on May 17, 2019; the vote carried with 236 votes for and 173 against. Eight Republicans voted in favor of the bill and no Democrats opposed it.

On March 13, 2019, Sen. Jeff Merkley (D-OR) introduced S. 788, the Equality Act of 2019, in the United States Senate. The bill was sponsored by 43 Democrats, 2 Independents, and 1 Republican.

=== 117th Congress ===
On February 18, 2021, H.R. 5 was reintroduced to the House of Representatives. It was passed by the House for the second time on February 25, 2021, and now moves on to the Senate. Notable speeches were heard by, among others, Nancy Pelosi, Marjorie Taylor Greene, and Marie Newman. Among Republican Representatives, only Tom Reed, John Katko, and Brian Fitzpatrick voted in favor; fewer than in the previous Congress. Mario Díaz-Balart and Elise Stefanik previously voted in favor but now voted against.

On February 23, 2021, a companion bill, S. 393, was introduced in the Senate. It was referred to the Judiciary Committee, where a hearing was held on March 17, 2021. It had, as of February 26, 2021, 48 co-sponsors. However, it was unable to gain enough support among Republicans to meet the 60-vote threshold to overcome a filibuster and did not advance further.

=== 119th Congress ===
On April 30, 2025, Senator Jeff Merkley re-introduced the Equality Act in the Senate. That same day, Congressional Equality Caucus Chair Rep. Mark Takano re-introduced the legislation in the House of Representatives. Merkley and Takano held a press conference outside the Capitol on April 29, 2025 to advocate for the bill's passage along with Senate Minority Leader Chuck Schumer, Senators Cory Booker and Tammy Baldwin and Representative Nancy Pelosi.

== Legislative history ==
As of April 29, 2025:

Congress	Short title	Bill numbers	Date introduced	Sponsors	# of cosponsors	Latest status
114th Congress	Equality Act of 2015	H.R. 3185	July 23, 2015	David Cicilline (D–RI)	178	Died in committee
114th Congress	Equality Act of 2015	S. 1858	July 23, 2015	Jeff Merkley (D–OR)	42	Died in committee
115th Congress	Equality Act of 2017	H.R. 2282	May 2, 2017	David Cicilline (D–RI)	201	Died in committee
115th Congress	Equality Act of 2017	S. 1006	May 2, 2017	Jeff Merkley (D–OR)	47	Died in committee
116th Congress	Equality Act of 2019	H.R. 5	March 13, 2019	David Cicilline (D–RI)	240	Passed the House (236–173)
116th Congress	Equality Act of 2019	S. 788	March 13, 2019	Jeff Merkley (D–OR)	46	Died in committee
117th Congress	Equality Act of 2021	H.R. 5	February 18, 2021	David Cicilline (D–RI)	224	Passed the House (224–206)
117th Congress	Equality Act of 2021	S. 393	February 23, 2021	Jeff Merkley (D–OR)	48	Died in committee
118th Congress	Equality Act of 2023	H.R. 15	June 21, 2023	Mark Takano (D-CA)	219	Died in committee
118th Congress	Equality Act of 2023	S. 5	June 21, 2023	Jeff Merkley (D–OR)	50	Died in committee
119th Congress	Equality Act of 2025	H.R. 15	April 29, 2025	Mark Takano (D-CA)	217	Introduced
119th Congress	Equality Act of 2025	S. 1503	April 29, 2025	Jeff Merkley (D–OR)	46	Introduced

== See also ==
- Equal Rights Amendment
- Equality Amendment
- Employment Non-Discrimination Act
- LGBTQ employment discrimination in the United States
- LGBTQ rights in the United States
- Title IX
- CROWN Act of 2022
