= Single subject amendment =

Proposed amendment to the United States Constitution

The single subject amendment is a proposed amendment to the United States Constitution that would impose the single-subject rule on federal legislation, limiting the content of bills introduced in Congress to a single subject. The amendment would have the effect of limiting legislative tactics such as logrolling, earmarks, and pork barrel spending. It would also discourage the use of very long omnibus spending bills which are difficult for legislators to read and analyze in the time frame needed for a vote, and to which unrelated riders are often added late in the legislative process. As of 2016, 41 states have single-subject rules in their state constitutions, but the federal Congress has no such rule. Many of these state and local provisions are over a century old, and litigation is often used to enforce the provisions.

The amendment is promoted by a 527 SuperPAC also called Single Subject Amendment, which is seeking passage of the amendment through either the Congressional route or through calling a convention to propose amendments to the United States Constitution. A federal amendment was proposed as early as 1999 in a law journal article by Brannon Denning and Brooks R. Smith. The Florida Legislature in 2014 passed a memorial applying to Congress to call a convention for this purpose. A bill was introduced in the 113th Congress, and again in the 114th Congress, to propose the amendment by Congressman Tom Marino. This bill has also been introduced by Congressman Marino in the 115th Congress as H.J.Res. 25. The rule has also been proposed as a law, the One Subject At a Time Act, by Representative Mia Love, which would allow courts to strike down legislation that did not fulfill the rule.
