= Electoral College abolition amendment =

Proposed U.S. Constitutional amendments

Bills have been introduced in the US Congress on several occasions to amend the US Constitution to abolish or to reduce the power of the Electoral College and to provide for the direct popular election of the US president and vice president.

== Bayh–Celler amendment (1969–1970) ==
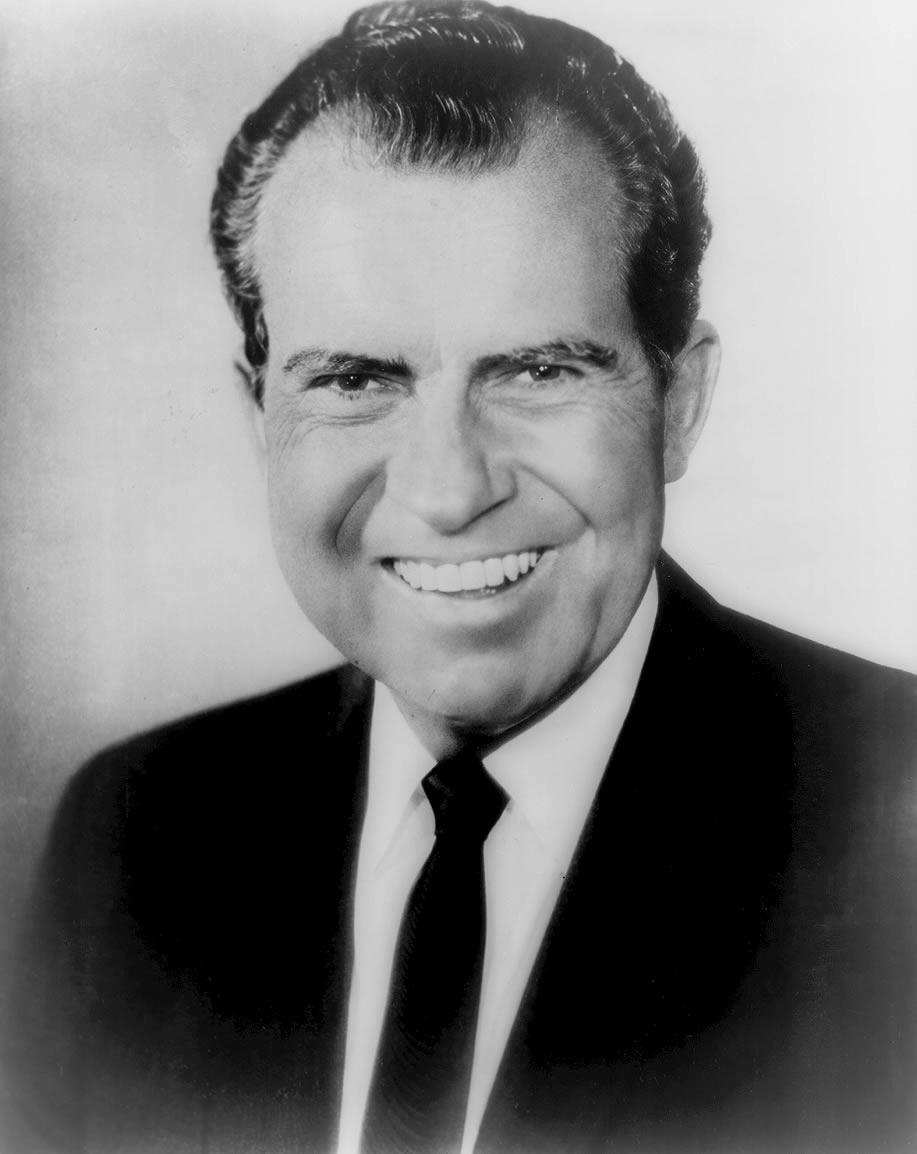
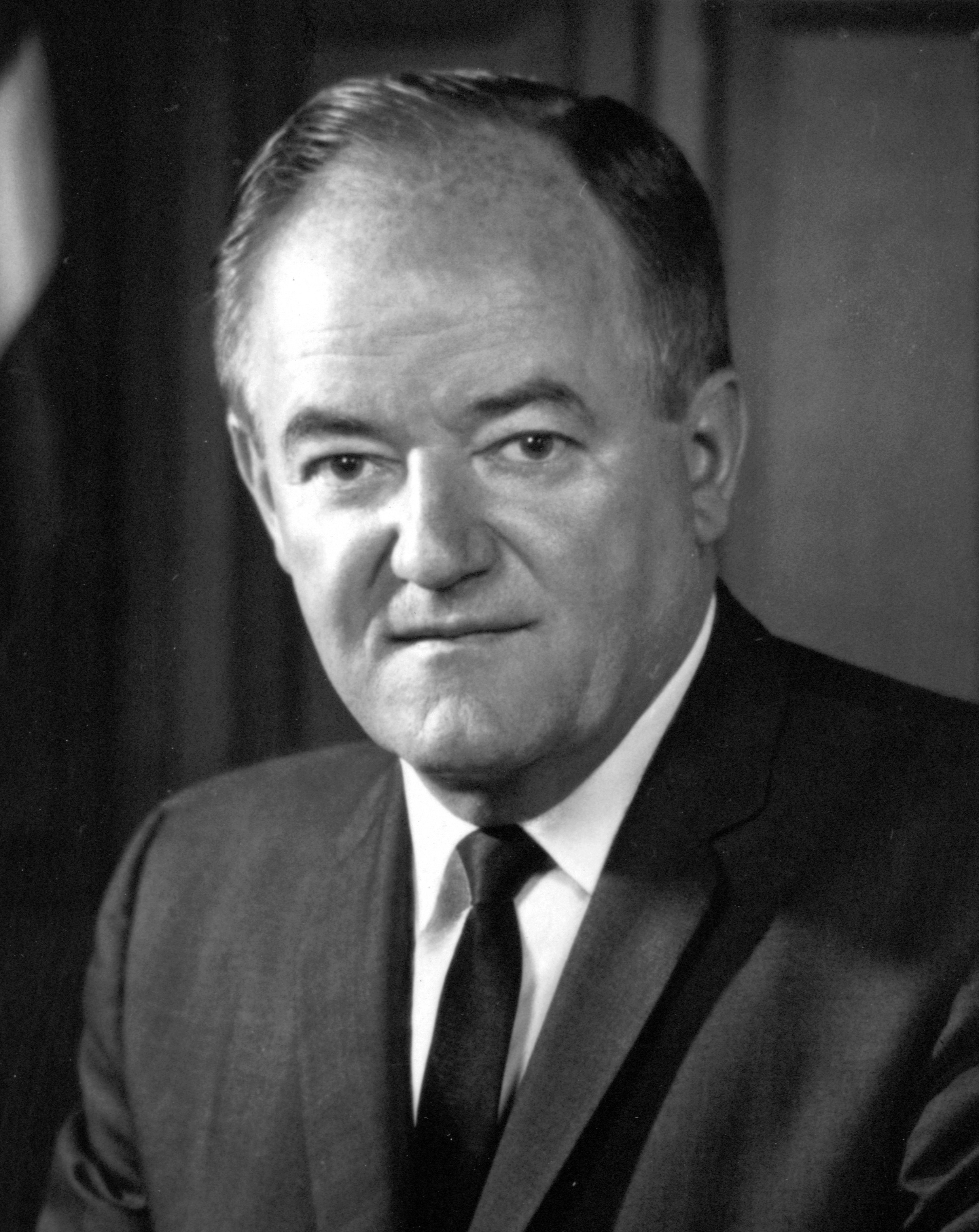

The closest that the United States has come to abolishing the Electoral College occurred during the 91st Congress (1969–1971). The presidential election of 1968 resulted in Richard Nixon receiving 301 electoral votes (56% of electors), Hubert Humphrey 191 (35.5%), and George Wallace 46 (8.5%) with 13.5% of the popular vote. However, Nixon had received only 511,944 more popular votes than Humphrey, 43.5% to 42.9%, less than 1% of the national total.

Representative Emanuel Celler (D-New York), chairman of the House Judiciary Committee, responded to public concerns over the disparity between the popular vote and electoral vote by introducing House Joint Resolution 681, a proposed constitutional amendment to replace the Electoral College with a simpler two-round system based on the national popular vote similar to that used in French presidential elections. The proposed system would have the pair of candidates who received the highest number of votes win the presidency and the vice presidency if they won at least 40% of the national popular vote. If no pair won at least 40% of the popular vote, a runoff election would be held in which the choice of president and vice president would be made from the two pairs of persons who had received the highest number of votes in the first election. The word "pair" was defined as "two persons who shall have consented to the joining of their names as candidates for the offices of President and Vice President."

On April 29, 1969, the House Judiciary Committee voted 28 to 6 to approve the proposal. Debate on the proposal before the full House of Representatives ended on September 11, 1969 and was eventually passed with bipartisan support on September 18, 1969, by a vote of 339 to 70. On September 30, 1969, President Nixon gave his endorsement for adoption of the proposal and encouraging the Senate to pass its version of the proposal, which had been sponsored as Senate Joint Resolution 1 by Senator Birch Bayh (D-Indiana).

On October 8, 1969, the New York Times reported that 30 state legislatures were "either certain or likely to approve a constitutional amendment embodying the direct election plan if it passes its final Congressional test in the Senate." Ratification of 38 state legislatures would have been needed for adoption. The paper also reported that six other states had yet to state a preference, six were leaning toward opposition, and eight were solidly opposed.

On August 14, 1970, the Senate Judiciary Committee sent its report advocating passage of the proposal to the full Senate. The Judiciary Committee had approved the proposal by a vote of 11 to 6. The six members who opposed the plan, Democratic Senators James Eastland (Mississippi), John Little McClellan (Arkansas), and Sam Ervin (North Carolina), along with Republican Senators Roman Hruska (Nebraska), Hiram Fong (Hawaii), and Strom Thurmond (South Carolina), all argued that although the present system had potential loopholes, it had worked well throughout the years. Bayh indicated that supporters of the measure were about a dozen votes shy from the 67 needed for the proposal to pass the full Senate. He called upon Nixon to attempt to persuade undecided Republican senators to support the proposal. Nixon did not renege on his previous endorsement, but he chose not to make any further personal appeals to back the proposal.

On September 8, 1970, the Senate commenced open debate on the proposal, but it was quickly filibustered. The lead objectors to the proposal were mostly southern senators and conservatives from small states, both Democrats and Republicans, who argued that abolishing the Electoral College would reduce their states' political influence. On September 17, 1970, a motion for cloture, which would have ended the filibuster, received 54 votes for cloture to 36 against failing to receive the required two-thirds of senators voting. A second motion for cloture on September 29, 1970, also failed by 53 to 34. Thereafter, Senate Majority Leader Mike Mansfield of Montana moved to lay the proposal aside so the Senate could attend to other business. However, the proposal was never considered again and died when the 91st Congress ended on January 3, 1971.

== Every Vote Counts Amendment (2005) ==
The Every Vote Counts Amendment was a joint resolution to amend the US Constitution to provide for the popular election of the president and the vice president under a new electoral system. The proposed constitutional amendment sought to abolish the Electoral College and to have every presidential election determined by a plurality of the national vote. It was introduced by US Representative Gene Green (D-Texas) on January 4, 2005.

Green then again introduced the legislation on January 7, 2009 as H.J.Res. 9. Later, two similar joint resolutions were introduced, a measure sponsored by US Representative Jesse Jackson Jr. (D-Illinois), H.J.Res. 36, which would require a majority vote for president, and one sponsored by Senator Bill Nelson (D-Florida), S.J.Res. 4, which would leave the method of election to an Act of Congress. All three resolutions died in committee during the 111th Congress.

=== Text of proposed amendment ===
Section 1. The President and Vice President shall be elected by the people of the several States and the district constituting the seat of government of the United States.
Section 2. The electors in each State shall have the qualifications requisite for electors of Senators and Representatives in Congress from that State, except that the legislature of any State may prescribe less restrictive qualifications with respect to residence and Congress may establish uniform residence and age qualifications.
Section 3. The persons having the greatest number of votes for President and Vice President shall be elected.
Section 4. Each elector shall cast a single vote jointly applicable to President and Vice President. Names of candidates may not be joined unless they shall have consented thereto and no candidate may consent to the candidate's name being joined with that of more than one other person.
Section 5. The Congress may by law provide for the case of the death of any candidate for President or Vice President before the day on which the President-elect or Vice President-elect has been chosen, and for the case of a tie in any election.
Section 6. This article shall apply with respect to any election for President and Vice President held after the expiration of the 1-year period which begins on the date of the ratification of this article.

=== Background ===
Section 1, 3, and 4 relate to the process of the election. Section 1 states that the president and the vice president will be elected by the residents of states and the District of Columbia. Section 3 states that the election is won by the candidate supported by a plurality of the votes cast. There is no provision for a runoff in the event that no candidate wins by an overall majority. Section 4 pushes the joint candidacy requirement enacted by all states. To prevent misinterpretation for voters by having too many choices, candidates may not be joined by more than one other person on the ballot.

Section 2 relates to the voter qualifications in three implementations. The first implementation is reusing requirements for qualification to vote that were established and used for the electoral system. Those qualifications are stated in Article 1, Section 2, and in the 17th Amendment and are further defined by the 14th, 15th, 19th, 24th and 26th Amendments. The second implementation would affect the resident periods in states to allow states to make little to no waiting periods to vote if one changed residence of state. The third and last implementation would allow Congress to input age requirements for elections and establish uniform residence, which could supersede the 26th Amendment and make the age requirement higher or lower.

Section 5 would give power to Congress. If the amendment was put into place, and a candidate dies or there is a tie between two candidates, it would allow Congress to make decisions depending on the event if it was to take place such as postponing an election. Section 5 gives more power to Congress over the election process and system.

Section 6 relates to how the Amendment come into effect. As long as the amendment is put into place one year before the next election, the amendment would be used for the next presidential election.

== Boxer and Cohen proposals (2016) ==
On November 15, 2016, Senator Barbara Boxer (D-California) introduced a proposal to abolish the electoral college and to provide for the direct popular election of the President and Vice President of the United States by the voters in the various states and the District of Columbia. Representative Steve Cohen (D-Tennessee) introduced a companion resolution in the House of Representatives on January 5, 2017. Unlike the Bayh–Celler amendment 40% threshold for election, Cohen's proposal requires a candidate to have only the "greatest number of votes" to be elected.

== Schatz, Durbin and Welch proposed amendment (2024) ==
On December 16, 2024, Democratic Senators Brian Schatz (D-Hawaii), Dick Durbin (D-Illinois) and Peter Welch (D-Vermont) proposed a constitutional amendment to abolish the Electoral College.

== See also ==
- Efforts to reform the United States Electoral College
- List of proposed amendments to the United States Constitution
- List of United States presidential elections in which the winner lost the popular vote
- National Popular Vote Interstate Compact
