= Gene Green =

American politician (born 1947)

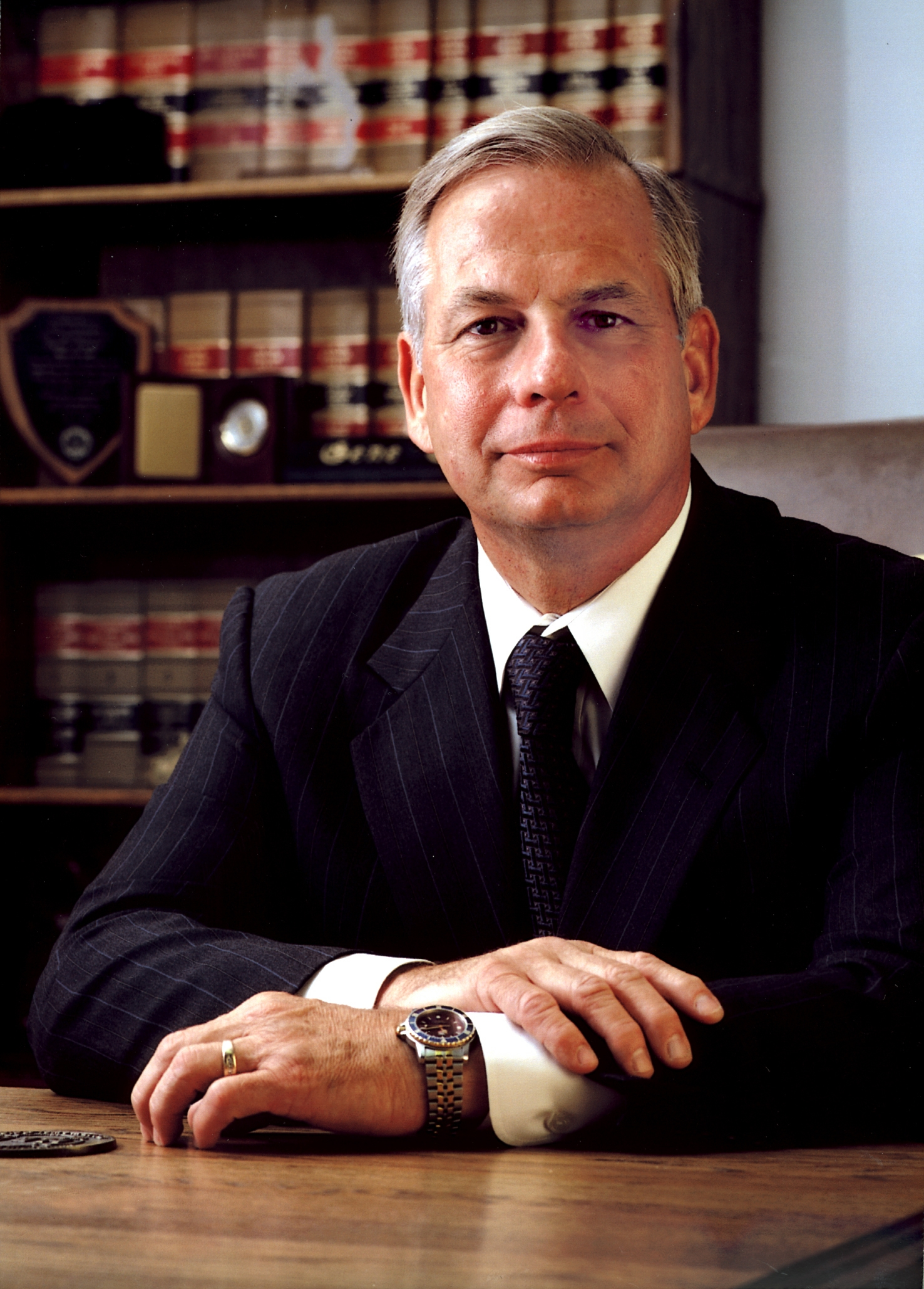

Chair of the House Ethics Committee
- Acting
- In office August 20, 2008 – January 3, 2009
- Preceded by: Stephanie Tubbs Jones
- Succeeded by: Zoe Lofgren

Member of the U.S. House of Representatives from Texas's 29th district
- In office January 3, 1993 – January 3, 2019
- Preceded by: Constituency established
- Succeeded by: Sylvia Garcia

Member of the Texas Senate from the 6th district
- In office May 27, 1985 – January 3, 1993
- Preceded by: Lindon Williams
- Succeeded by: Dan Shelley

Member of the Texas House of Representatives
- In office January 9, 1973 – May 27, 1985
- Preceded by: J. W. Buchanan
- Succeeded by: Gene Haney
- Constituency: 95th district (1973–1981); 140th district (1981–1985)

Personal details
- Born: Raymond Eugene Green; October 17, 1947 (age 78) Houston, Texas, U.S.
- Party: Democratic
- Spouse: Helen Green
- Education: University of Houston (BA, JD)
- Green's voice Green on the 75th anniversary of Continental Airlines. Recorded July 29, 2009

Raymond Eugene Green (born October 17, 1947) is an American politician who served as the U.S. representative for Texas's 29th congressional district, serving for 13 terms. He is a member of the Democratic Party. His district included most of eastern Houston, including portions of the suburbs.

In November 2017, Green announced that he would retire from Congress at the end of his current term, and not run for re-election in 2018.

== Early life, education, and early career ==
Green was born in Houston and he graduated from the University of Houston, earning a bachelor's degree in business administration in 1971 and a Juris Doctor degree in 1977. He held positions as a business manager and a private attorney prior to his election to Congress.

== Texas legislature ==
Green was first elected to the Texas House of Representatives in 1972. He was elected to the Texas Senate in 1985.

== U.S. House of Representatives ==
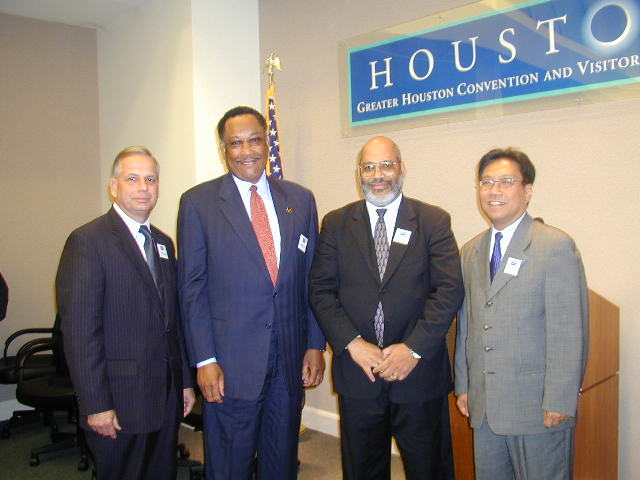
Gene Green, former Houston mayor Lee P. Brown, and others

=== Elections ===
Green was first elected to the U.S. House in 1992. Although the 29th was (then as now) drawn as a majority-Hispanic district, Green finished second in the five-way Democratic primary, behind city councilman Ben Reyes. Green defeated Reyes in the runoff by only 180 votes, all but assuring him of election in this heavily Democratic district. Green was reelected 12 times, never facing substantive electoral opposition. He ran unopposed in 1998, 2002 and 2004.

On November 13, 2017, Green announced his retirement. He later endorsed State Senator Sylvia Garcia, who now represented his old state senate district (and who finished third in the 1992 Democratic primary) as his successor. Garcia went on to win the primary, and easily won the general election.

Green left office in January 2019 after representing portions of eastern Houston for 46 years, having never lost an election.

=== Tenure ===
In the 115th Congress, Green was the only non-Hispanic white Democrat representing a significant portion of Houston, and one of only three in the entire Texas delegation (the others being Lloyd Doggett and Beto O'Rourke).

From 1996 until his retirement in 2019, Green was a member of the powerful House Energy and Commerce Committee. In 2011, he became Ranking Member of the Subcommittee on Environment and the Economy. He also served on the Subcommittee on Energy and Power and the Subcommittee on Oversight and Investigations.

=== Legislative issues ===
Since being elected to the House of Representatives, Green had been working on education, labor, energy, domestic manufacturing, health issues, NASA's Johnson Space Center, and Social Security and veterans benefits. He has worked to improve access to quality health care, support initiatives to improve our economy and increased job training, and maintain financial aid for students.

Green voted in favor of the Iraq Resolution in 2002, and gave a speech on the house floor linking Saddam Hussein to the September 11 attacks in 2001. Despite the Democratic leadership's general disapproval of the war, Green voted against measures aimed at placing a timetable on military withdrawal.

In September 2004, he proposed the Every Vote Counts Amendment, which would have abolished the U.S. electoral college in United States presidential elections.

Green proposed legislation addressing domestic and global electronic waste (e-waste) concerns. H.R. 2284, The Responsible Electronics Recycling Act of 2011, was introduced in the 112th Congress to prohibit the exportation of some electronics whose improper disposal may create environmental, health, or national security risks.

Green also served on the Energy and Commerce Committee's Subcommittee on Health during drafting of the Affordable Care Act of 2010 and helped write and amend the legislation. Afterward, he worked for increased access to affordable and quality health care.

=== Committee assignments ===
- Committee on Energy and Commerce
  - Subcommittee on Energy and Power
  - Subcommittee on Environment and Economy
  - Subcommittee on Health (Ranking Member)
  - Subcommittee on Oversight and Investigations

Caucus memberships

- Congressional Arts Caucus
- Congressional Vision Caucus
- Afterschool Caucuses
- Congressional NextGen 9-1-1 Caucus
- U.S.-Japan Caucus

U.S. House of Representatives
| New constituency | Member of the U.S. House of Representatives from Texas's 29th congressional district 1993–2019 | Succeeded by Sylvia Garcia |
| Preceded by Stephanie Tubbs Jones | Chair of House Ethics Committee; Acting; 2008–2009 | Succeeded by Zoe Lofgren |
U.S. order of precedence (ceremonial)
| Preceded by Martin Frost as Former U.S. Representative | Order of precedence of the United States as Former U.S. Representative | Succeeded by Mac Thornberry as Former U.S. Representative |
