= Single-subject rule =

Rule in constitutional law

The single-subject rule is a rule in the constitutional law of some jurisdictions that stipulates that some or all types of legislation may deal with only one main issue. One purpose is to avoid complexity in acts, to avoid any hidden provisions that legislators or voters may miss when reading the proposed law. Another is to prevent legislators attaching an unpopular provision ("rider") to an unrelated popular one, whether in the hope of sneaking the unpopular one through, or in the hope of causing the popular one to be rejected (a type of wrecking amendment). It also prevents log-rolling, whereby legislators trade votes with others to get them to vote for both bills.

== Scope of a bill ==
In English law, the long title of a bill or act of parliament states its purpose; this may enumerate multiple purposes, or end with a vague formula like "and for other purposes". A proposed amendment to a bill may be rejected if it is outside the scope defined in its long title; alternatively, the title may be amended to increase its scope. An omnibus bill covers a number of diverse or unrelated topics.

== By country ==
=== Australia ===
Section 55 of the Constitution of Australia provides a single-subject rule for taxation legislation: "Laws imposing taxation shall deal only with the imposition of taxation, and any provision therein dealing with any other matter shall be of no effect". The same section also requires laws imposing taxation to "deal with one subject of taxation only" (except those relating to customs and excise).

=== Ireland ===
The 1937 Constitution of Ireland states that "A Bill containing a proposal or proposals for the amendment of this Constitution shall not contain any other proposal". This was in contrast to the 1922 Constitution of the Irish Free State, which could be implicitly amended.

=== Philippines ===
Section 26(1) of the Constitution of the Philippines states that "Every bill passed by the Congress shall embrace only one subject which shall be expressed in the title thereof."

=== Sweden ===
The Parliamentary Act (Swedish: Riksdagsordningen) states that "proposals on different subjects may not be combined in one motion".

=== Switzerland ===
In Swiss law, the "principle of the unity of the subject matter" (German: Grundsatz der Einheit der Materie, French: principe de l'unité de la matière, Italian: principio dell'unità della materia) applies to federal popular initiatives and to parliamentary legislation that is subject to a referendum. It has been derived by the Swiss Federal Supreme Court from the provision in article 34, section 2 of the Swiss Federal Constitution which guarantees "the freedom of the citizen to form an opinion and to give genuine expression to his or her will" in the exercise of political rights. The Court has outlined the principle as follows:

"The principle of the unity of the subject matter requires that the subject of a referendum may, in principle, have only one topic area as its subject, that is, that two or several substantive questions or subject matters may not be joined into one referendum proposition in such a way that the voters face a dilemma and do not have a free choice between the several parts. If an item of legislation addresses several substantive questions or subject matters, the unity of the subject matter is only preserved if the several parts have a material intrinsic connection with each other, are materially related to each other and are aimed at the same goal; this material connection may not be merely artificial, subjective or political in nature. (...) Because the concept of the unity of the subject matter is a relative one, and because the weight given to the several parts of a legislative proposition and their relationship to each other is principally a political question, the authorities enjoy wide discretion in the shaping of referendum propositions."

=== United States ===
The single subject rule exists in 43 state constitutions in the United States. 41 states apply the rule to all legislation, whereas Mississippi and Arkansas apply it only to appropriations bills.

States with a single-subject rule include Alabama, Alaska, Arizona, California, Colorado, Delaware, Florida, Georgia, Hawaii, Idaho, Illinois, Indiana, Iowa, Kansas, Kentucky, Louisiana, Maryland, Michigan, Minnesota, Missouri, Montana, Nebraska, Nevada, New Jersey, New Mexico, New York, North Dakota, Ohio, Oklahoma, Oregon, Pennsylvania, South Carolina, South Dakota, Tennessee, Texas, Utah, Virginia, Washington, Wisconsin, and Wyoming. The only states without a single-subject rule in their constitution are Connecticut, Maine, Massachusetts, New Hampshire, North Carolina, Rhode Island, and Vermont.

Several states with a single-subject rule make an exception for general appropriations, including Alabama, Alaska, Colorado, Delaware, Illinois, Indiana, Missouri, Montana, New Mexico, Oklahoma, Pennsylvania, Texas, Utah, and Wyoming. Some of these states listed also make an exception to the single-subject rule for codifying and revising laws, like Alabama's, for example: "[. . .] Each law shall contain but one subject, which shall be clearly expressed in its title, except general appropriation bills, general revenue bills, and bills adopting a code, digest, or revision of statutes [. . .]"

26 states allow for citizen-initiated ballot measures, 16 of which apply a single-subject rule to all ballot measures, while 10 do not require a single-subject rule be applied to ballot measures.

For example, the constitution of Minnesota, Article IV, Section 17, requires that "No law shall embrace more than one subject, which shall be expressed in its title." Conversely, neither the U.S. Congress nor the U.S. Constitution has such a rule, so riders which are completely unrelated to the main bill are commonplace. These amendments are often put into bills at the last minute, so that any representative who may read the legislation before actually voting on it will not have a chance to catch it. An effort is underway, however, to add a single subject amendment to the U.S. Constitution to apply a single subject rule to the Congress.

It has been charged that single-subject rules have been misused as a political or judicial measure to slow or nullify ballot initiatives. An example of accusation of misuse of this law occurred in Colorado when a former governor made a statement against a single-subject ruling. The rule can also result in overly narrow questions, that result in no substantial effects.

In July 2006, the Georgia Supreme Court ruled that a November 2004 amendment to the constitution of Georgia against same-sex marriage would be allowed to stand, despite also banning recognition of same-sex marriages done in other states, and banning civil unions. Additionally, voters in the referendum were told of only the same-sex marriage question, while the ballot failed to mention the other two issues, preventing voters from giving fully informed consent. A judge had previously ruled that voters had the right to decide the issue of civil unions separately, thus putting the two issues as one violated Georgia's single-subject rule.

== See also ==
- Omnibus bill
- Poison pill amendment
- Rider (legislation)
- Tinbergen rule: effective policymaking requires a separate instrument for each policy goal
