= Equality Amendment =

Proposed amendment to the U.S. Constitution

The Equality Amendment is a proposed amendment to the U.S. Constitution by legal scholars Kimberlé Crenshaw and Catharine MacKinnon. It was first proposed in December 2019 in the Yale Law Journal. This proposal is an updated version of the Equal Rights Amendment written by Alice Paul from the National Women's Party, which was first proposed in 1923 and has not been ratified. This is different from the 2021 Equality Act, which has been proposed in Congress to prohibit discrimination based on biological sex, gender identity or sexual orientation.

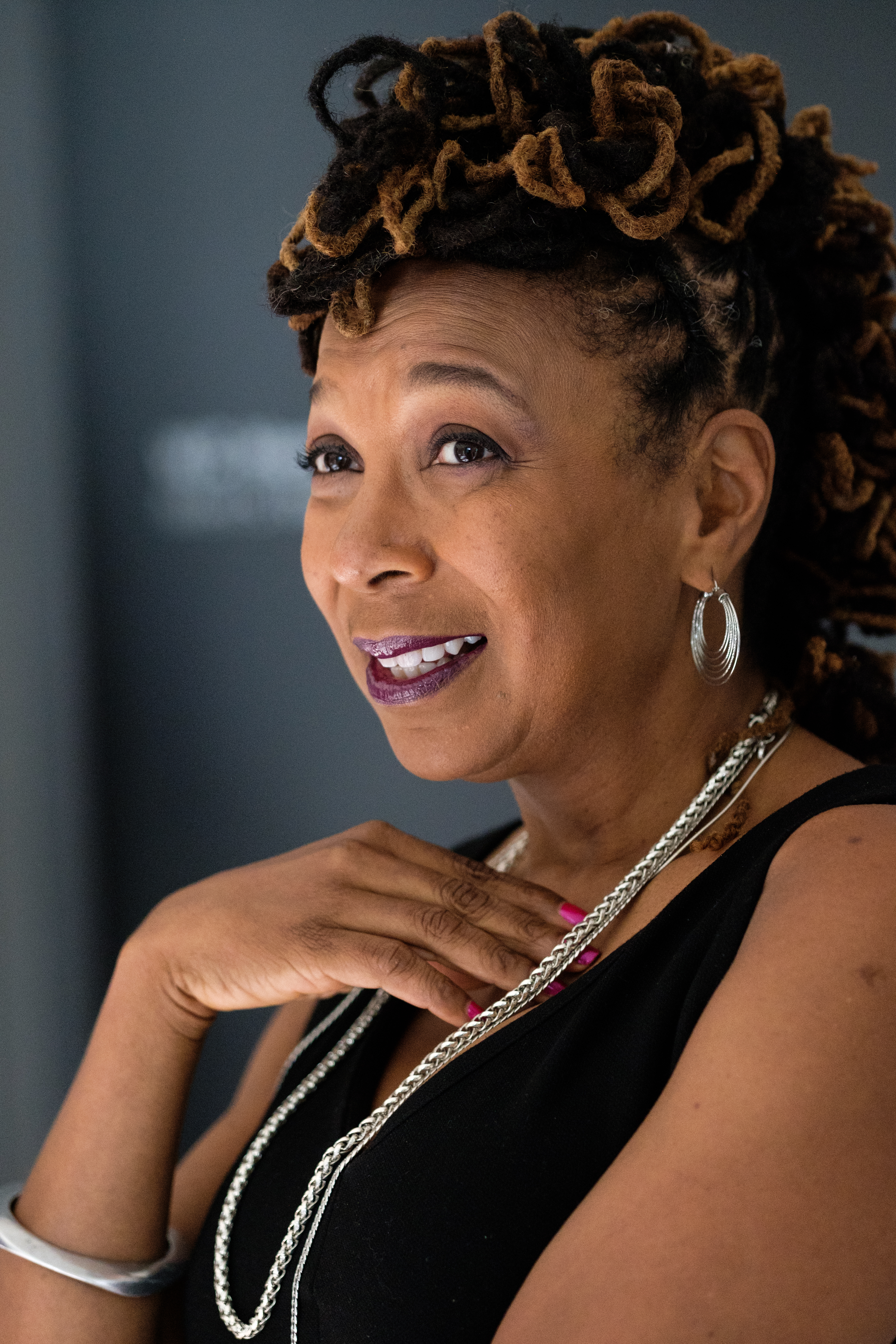
Professor Kimberlé Crenshaw

== Background ==
The United States is the only industrialized democracy that does not ensure rights for women in its federal constitution. Although the required 38 states have passed the amendment as of 2020, the U.S. archivist has not ratified the amendment due to a congressionally-set ratification deadline of March 22, 1979, which some state approvals surpassed. This is despite the fact that adding an amendment to the U.S. Constitution to ensure gender equality has broad support in the United States. In July 2020 Pew Research Center reported 78% of Americans support the ERA being added to the Constitution. A lawsuit, Commonwealth of Virginia v. David Ferriero, was filed in January 2020 to force the archivist to ratify the ERA. On March 5, 2021, the Washington, D.C. district court dismissed the case, stating that the archivist's publication of the ERA would not constitute ratification, and holding that the ERA's ratification deadline was lawful. This left proponents of the ERA with few options for further action, including attempting to extend the ERA ratification deadline, or writing a new amendment.

== Updates to the wording of the amendment ==
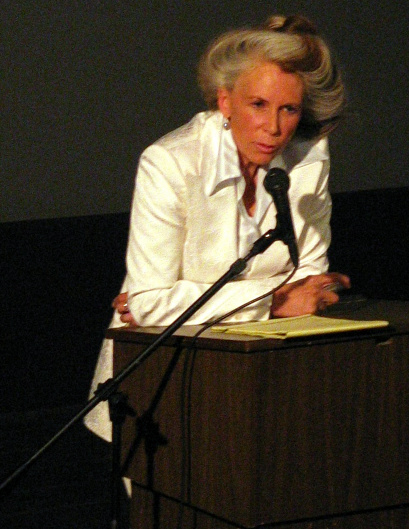
Professor Catharine A. MacKinnon

Crenshaw and MacKinnon are longtime civil rights scholar activists who argue the Equal Rights Amendment should be updated to represent modern day intersectional issues. The ERA has a long history of women of color working for its ratification such as Shirley Chisholm and Patsy Mink. They present the argument equality is foundations to the U.S. republic and the equal protection clause does not go far enough to eliminate discrimination based on sex. This argument builds upon the work of previous feminist legal scholars such as Pauli Murray, Dorothy Kenyon and Ruth Bader Ginsburg. According to MacKinnon, who is one of the most frequently cited legal scholars, the updated wording takes an intersectional approach in its aim to protect women's rights.

The Section 1 of the original ERA reads, "Equality of rights under the law shall not be denied or abridged by the United States or by any state on account of sex." Section 1 of the updated Equality Amendment reads, "Women in all their diversity shall have equal rights in the United States and every place subject to its jurisdiction."

== Support ==
Legal scholar Kim Forde-Mazrui has argued the proposed Equality Amendment, "...would better promote women's equality." Professor Julie Suk, an expert in ERA history, believes that an amendment added to the U.S. Constitution that aims to grant women equality should, "...go beyond nondiscrimination."

== See also ==
- Feminist legal theory
- Intersectionality
- Feminism in the United States
