= Feminist Criminology (journal) =

- Language: English
- Edited by: Kristy Holtfreter

Publication details
- History: 2006-present
- Publisher: SAGE Publications
- Frequency: Quarterly
- Impact factor: 0.871 (2017)

Standard abbreviations
- ISO 4: Fem. Criminol.

Indexing
- ISSN: 1557-0851
- LCCN: 2005214979
- OCLC no.: 61145057

Links
- Journal homepage; Online access; Online archive

Feminist Criminology is a peer-reviewed academic journal that covers the field of criminology, especially research and theory that highlights the gendered nature in areas such as girls and women as victims, feminist theories of crime, and girls and women and the justice system. The journal's editor-in-chief is Kristy Holtfreter (Arizona State University). It was established in 2006 and is published by SAGE Publications in association with the Division on Women and Crime of the American Society of Criminology.

== Abstracting and indexing ==
The journal is abstracted and indexed in Scopus and the Social Sciences Citation Index. According to the Journal Citation Reports, its 2017 impact factor is 0.871, ranking it 41 out of 61 journals in the category "Criminology & Penology".
