= Parental Rights Amendment to the United States Constitution =

Proposed change to the U.S. Constitution

The Parental Rights Amendment to the United States Constitution is a proposed change to the United States Constitution. The amendment's advocates say that it would ensure parents' rights to direct the upbringing of their children, protected from federal interference and the United Nations Convention on the Rights of the Child. The Amendment was first proposed during the 110th Congress as House Joint Resolution 97 in July 2008, but no action was taken during that Congress. The Amendment has been described as a "wedge issue" and part of the culture wars.

== Text ==
The current language (as proposed in H.J.Res.36) is as follows:

SECTION 1

The liberty of parents to direct the upbringing, education, and care of their children is a fundamental right.

SECTION 2
The parental right to direct education includes the right to choose, as an alternative to public education, private, religious, or home schools, and the right to make reasonable choices within public schools for one's child.

SECTION 3
Neither the United States nor any State shall infringe these rights without demonstrating that its governmental interest as applied to the person is of the highest order and not otherwise served.

SECTION 4
The parental rights guaranteed by this article shall not be denied or abridged on account of disability.

SECTION 5

This article shall not be construed to apply to a parental action or decision that would end life.

== Legislative history ==
=== 110th Congress (2007–2008) ===
The Parental Rights Amendment was proposed by Rep. Pete Hoekstra (R-MI) as H.J. Res. 97 on June 26, 2008, but had no additional sponsors. On July 28, 2008, it was referred to the Subcommittee on the Constitution, Civil Rights, and Civil Liberties.

=== 111th Congress (67-420) ===
The Parental Rights Amendment was proposed by Rep. Pete Hoekstra (R-MI) on March 31, 2009, and numbered H.J.Res.42. On April 27, 2009, it was referred to the Subcommittee on the Constitution, Civil Rights, and Civil Liberties. It garnered 141 cosponsors.

In the Senate, an identical bill (which was numbered S.J.Res.13) was introduced by Sen. David Vitter (R-LA) on March 3, 2009, but had no additional sponsors. It was referred to the Committee on the Judiciary.

On May 14, 2009, Sen. Jim DeMint (R-SC) proposed the Parental Rights Amendment with an additional section clarifying that "This article shall take effect after the date of ratification." It was numbered S.J.Res.16; it was referred to the Committee on the Judiciary. It received 6 cosponsors.

=== 112th Congress (2011–2012) ===
The Parental Rights Amendment was proposed multiple times in the 112th Congress.

On January 5, 2011, Rep. John Fleming (R-LA) proposed the Parental Rights Amendment without the additional section added in S.J.Res.16; it was numbered H.J.Res.3. It was referred to the Subcommittee on the Constitution on January 24, 2011. It received 17 cosponsors.

On March 29, 2012, Rep. Trent Franks (R-AZ), chairman of the Subcommittee on the Constitution, proposed the Parental Rights Amendment with a slightly modified first section; it was numbered H.J.Res.107. It was also referred to the Subcommittee on the Constitution on April 9, 2012. It received 21 cosponsors.

On June 5, 2012, Rep. Trent Franks (R-AZ) again proposed the Parental Rights Amendment with a slightly modified first section and an additional section clarifying that "This article shall not be construed to apply to a parental action or decision that would end life"; it was numbered H.J.Res.110. On June 18, it was referred to the Subcommittee on the Constitution, and on July 18, subcommittee hearings were held. It received 85 cosponsors.

In the Senate, Sen. Jim DeMint (R-SC) proposed a resolution identical to H.J.Res.110 on June 5, 2012; it was numbered S.J.Res.42. It was referred to the Senate Judiciary Committee. It received 12 cosponsors.

=== 113th Congress (2013–2014) ===
The Parental Rights Amendment was proposed, with the first section expanded into two sections, by Rep. Mark Meadows (R-NC) on June 18, 2013, and numbered H.J.Res.50. It was referred to the Subcommittee on the Constitution and Civil Justice. It received 80 cosponsors.

In the Senate, the Parental Rights Amendment was proposed by Sen. Lindsey Graham (R-SC) on June 4, 2014, with identical wording as in the House. It was numbered S.J.Res.37. It was referred to the Senate Judiciary Committee. It received 5 cosponsors.

=== 114th Congress (2015–2016) ===
The Parental Rights Amendment was again proposed by Rep. Trent Franks (R-AZ), with modified wording; it was numbered H.J.Res.91. It was referred to the Subcommittee on the Constitution and Civil Justice on May 17, 2016. It currently has 10 cosponsors.

In the Senate, Sen. Lindsey Graham (R-SC) proposed the Parental Rights Amendment with its current wording on June 29, 2016. It was numbered S.J.Res.36. It was referred to the Senate Judiciary Committee. It had 5 cosponsors as of July 25, 2016.

=== 115th Congress (2017–2018) ===
The Parental Rights Amendment was again proposed by Sen. Lindsey Graham (R-SC) with its current wording on August 1, 2017. It was numbered S.J.Res.48. It was referred to the Senate Judiciary Committee. It had 5 cosponsors as of August 1, 2017.

In the House, Rep. Randy Hultgren (R-IL) proposed the Parental Rights Amendment with its current wording on November 16, 2017. It was numbered H.J.Res.121. It was referred to the Subcommittee on the Constitution and Civil Justice. It had 20 cosponsors as of July 19, 2018.

=== 116th Congress (2019–2020) ===
The Parental Rights Amendment was again proposed by Rep. Jim Banks (R-IN) with its current wording on January 1, 2019. It was numbered H.J.Res.36 It was referred to the Subcommittee on the Constitution, Civil Rights, and Civil Liberties on January 30, 2019. It had 19 cosponsors as of December 3, 2019.

=== 118th Congress (2023–2024) ===
The amendment was re-introduced in the House as H.J.Res.38. It was sponsored by Rep. Debbie Lesko, a Republican from Arizona, and cosponsored by seven other Republicans.

=== State legislatures (2010 to present) ===
In 2010 the legislatures of Louisiana and South Dakota adopted resolutions calling on the U.S. Congress to propose the Parental Rights Amendment to the States for ratification. In 2011, the legislatures in Idaho, Montana, and Florida passed similar resolutions. In 2012, Wyoming passed a similar resolution. In 2019, Oklahoma became the seventh state to pass a resolution calling on Congress to pass the Parental Rights Amendment to the states for ratification.

== Support ==
Support for the amendment is found at organizations such as the American Family Association, Concerned Women for America, Focus on the Family, Liberty Counsel, and the Traditional Values Coalition. Proponents of the amendment at ParentalRights.org contend that it will preserve the rights of children, arguing that the question is not one of the child rights versus parents' rights, but whether parents or the government can best decide what is in a child's best interest. They contend that Section Three of their proposal will preserve the authority of the State to intercede for children who are abused or neglected, just as it exists today. Proponents of the amendment at FamilyPreservationFoundation.org (FPF) contend that Parental Rights and Children's Rights are intertwined. FPF founder Dwight Mitchell states, "Parents have the duty to protect their children's rights until they are old enough to make their own way in the world. Children have the right to be safe, to be treated with affection, to be educated, to have medical care and to be protected against cruelty and abuse which loving parents provide." Section three provides "Neither the United States nor any State shall infringe these rights without demonstrating that its governmental interest as applied to the person is of the highest order and not otherwise served." They also contend children need to be raised by loving nurturing parents, not the government and advocate for state and federal policy legislation which respects parental rights, children rights and the universal rights of the extended families like Grandparents, Aunts and Uncles.

On September 22, 2020, Family Preservation Foundation created a petition on the "We the People" website at petitions.whitehouse.gov to gather signatures to urge Congress to act on H.J.Res.36 which was before congress during the current session.

Rep. Hoekstra has cited Antonin Scalia's dissenting opinion in Troxel v. Granville, where he argued that the Constitution did not confer upon judges the power to recognize parental rights not explicitly enumerated, as a motivation for the Amendment. The plurality in Troxel v. Granville stated that parental rights to direct the upbringing of their children is a fundamental right, with Justice Thomas saying any infringement of that right should be examined under strict scrutiny.

=== Convention on the Rights of the Child ===
Proponents of the amendment often cite concern over possible U.S. ratification of the United Nations' Convention on the Rights of the Child. Article Six, Section Two of the Constitution incorporates treaties ratified by the Senate into U.S. law, requiring state and federal judges to uphold treaty obligations. Constitutional lawyer Michael Farris, author and chief proponent of the Amendment, expresses concern that ratifying the convention would disrupt state-level family law and shift power from the State to the federal government, leading to interference in the parent-child relationship.

Farris and allied organizations also cite the theory of customary international law as a threat, claiming that elements of the Convention might become binding on the United States even without ratification.

== Opposition ==
Tom Head of About.com contends that the proposal contains "numerous 'poison pills' that would prevent it from being supported by mainstream civil libertarians," saying that its language is overbroad and would enable abuse and neglect by parents. He describes the amendment as unserious, meant more as a "rallying point" for "ultra-conservative legislators" than as a genuine amendment to the Constitution.

Sen. Tim Johnson (D-SD) says that the amendment was crafted in response to the U.N.'s Convention on the Rights of the Child, but that the Convention is not a real threat to parental rights; therefore, an amendment is not necessary. Mary Landrieu (D-LA) points out that the Convention has not been ratified, and asserts that even if it is ratified, it will not infringe upon existing laws.

On September 9, 2017, former Rep. Rick Jore stated, "My opposition to such an amendment certainly is not that I do not believe parental rights to be of utmost importance, or that I do not think they are under attack," Jore said. "They certainly are. Too often, though, in our strategy to challenge illegitimate government action, we unwittingly accept the assumed authority behind the usurpation that is the cause of the action. It seems to me that we have gone from 'We hold these truths to be self-evident' to 'There is no absolute truth,' let alone 'self-evident truth.'"

On April 25, 2019, First Focus Campaign for Children (FFCC) express opposition to the amendment stating amongst other things, that it "would create greater threats to the safety, health, and well-being of children because the "parental rights" language preempts any protections for children absent a government interest of the "highest order" or "a parental action or decision that would end life." and "undermines the fundamental rights, protections, and voice of children and would do harm."

=== Opposition from homeschooling advocates ===
Larry Kaseman of Home Education magazine argues that the Amendment's focus on rights rather than responsibilities will empower parents to treat their children as property and shelter unfit parents from punishment for neglect and abuse. Kaseman also holds that parental rights exist separately from federal law, and expresses concern that a constitutional amendment would federalize family law, granting the government the power to give, define, limit, regulate, and take away parental rights. He argues that the Ninth Amendment to the United States Constitution already protects parental rights.

Deborah Stevenson of National Home Education Legal Defense (NHELD) argues, citing the Tenth Amendment, that parental rights fall within state jurisdiction and that the issue should be resolved at the state level.
